= Lamuka =

- Logos used by the group
- Leader: Martin Fayulu
- President: Martin Fayulu
- Presidium: Martin Fayulu; Matthieu Kalele Ka-Bila; Adolphe Muzito (until 2023); Moise Katumbi (until 2021); Jean-Pierre Bemba (until 2023); Freddy Matungulu (until 2019); Antipas Mbusa (until 2019)
- Spokesperson: Prince Epenge
- Founded: 11 November 2018; 7 years ago
- Ideology: Big tent
- Senate: 0 / 109
- National Assembly: 0 / 500

Lamuka (Lingala: Wake up) is an opposition political coalition in the Democratic Republic of the Congo led by Martin Fayulu and his party, Engagement for Citizenship and Development (ECiDé). Founded in 2018 to support Fayulu's candidacy against the ruling party and coalition of then-President Joseph Kabila, the coalition initially brought together seven major opposition leaders. Protests by party members reduced its membership to five, with some later additions. Over time, internal divisions further dwindled that number down to two and eventually to one, Fayulu, who has gradually opened up to the addition of several other political parties and personalities.

Fayulu placed second in the controversial 2018 vote, which most independent observers deemed fraudulent, while the coalition won 112 seats in the National Assembly. In 2019, it won 6 senate seats and one governorship. In 2023, the coalition refused to participate in the electoral process at all levels of government but fielded Fayulu as its presidential candidate, who ended up placing third behind Tshisekedi and Katumbi.

== History ==
=== Formation and first split ===
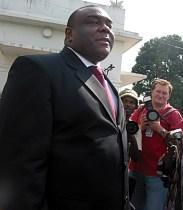
Bemba in 2006

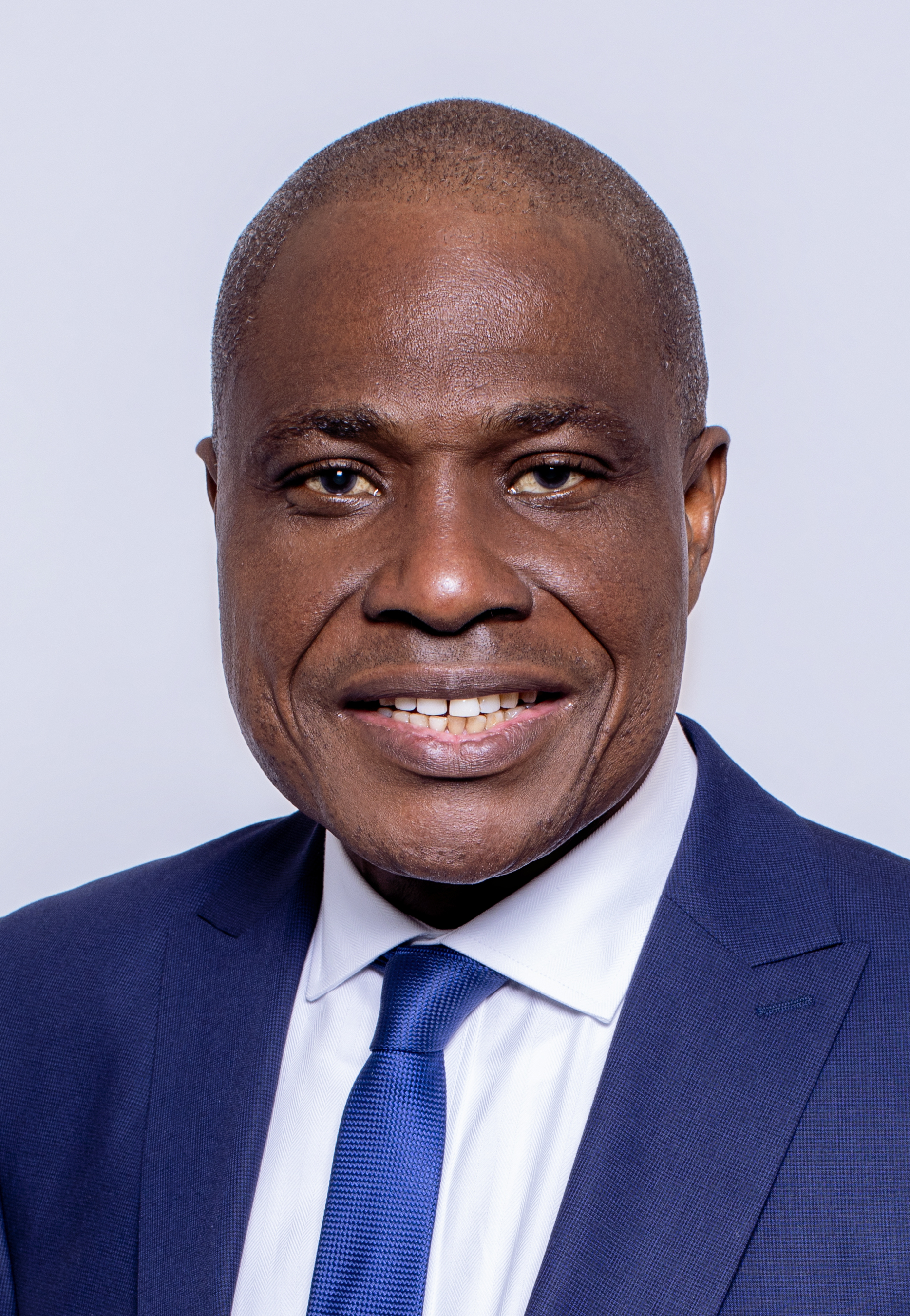
Fayulu in 2018

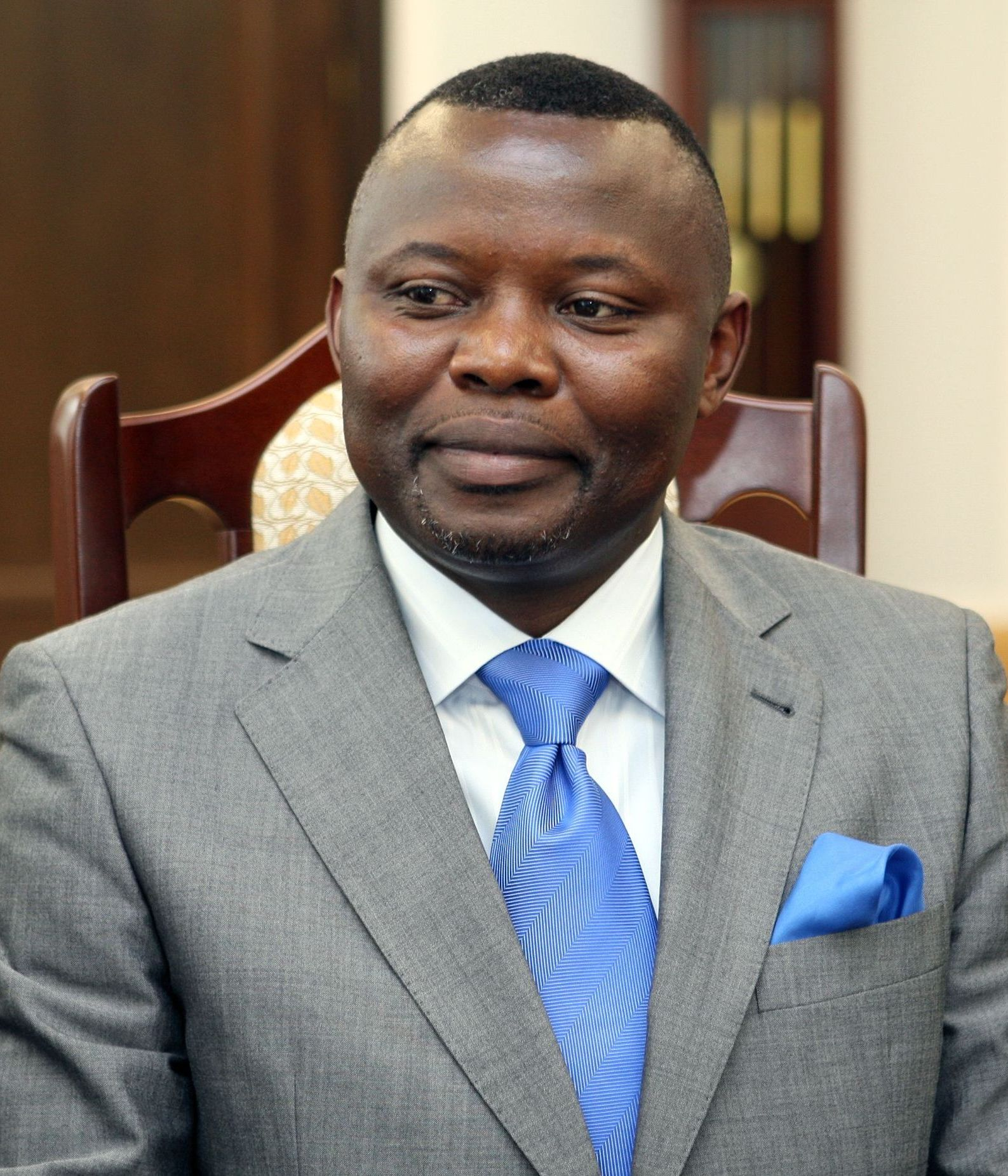
Kamerhe in 2007

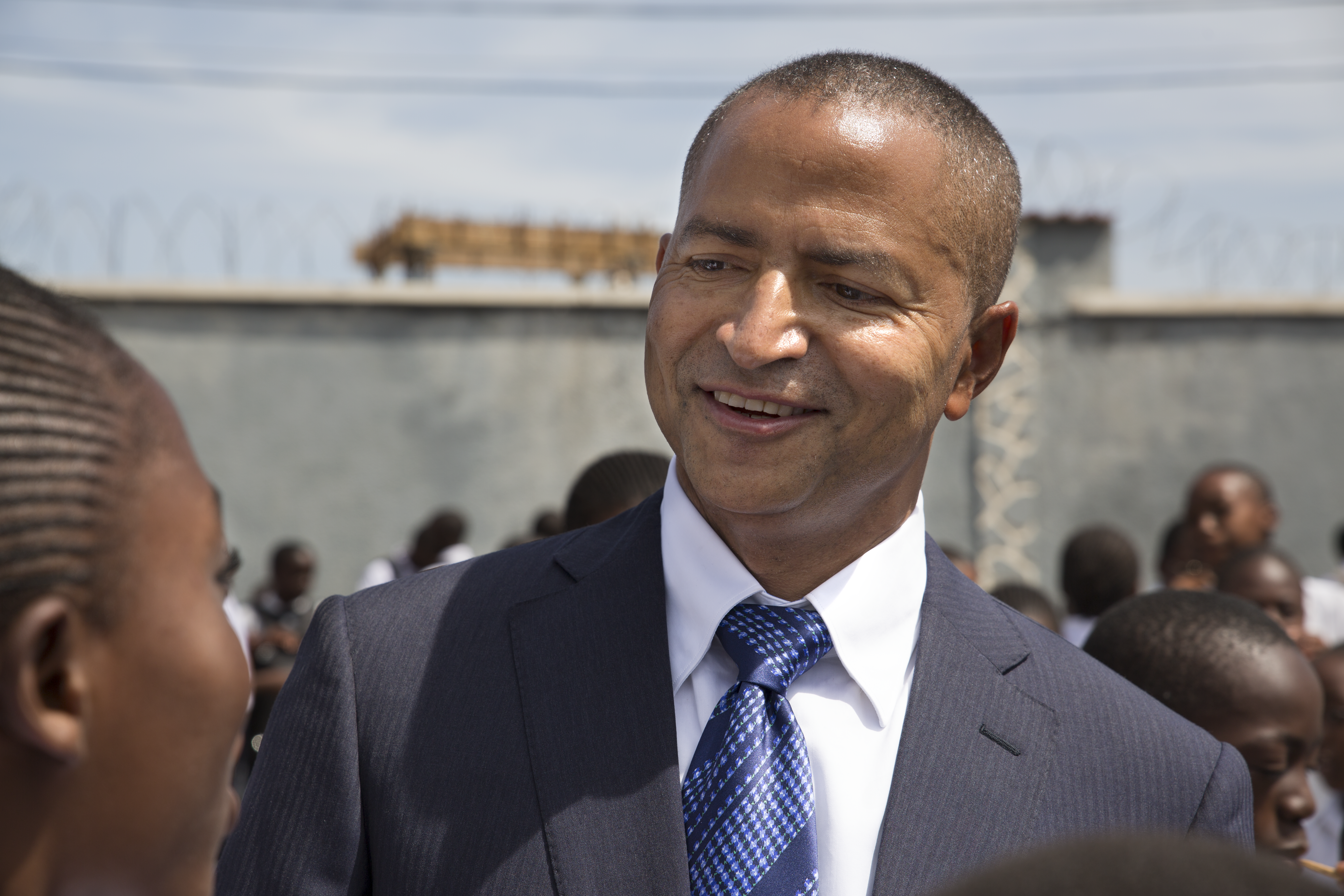
Katumbi in 2016

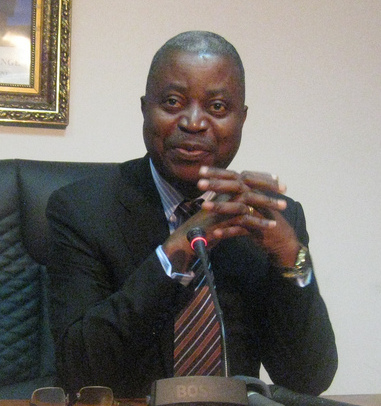
Muzito in 2009

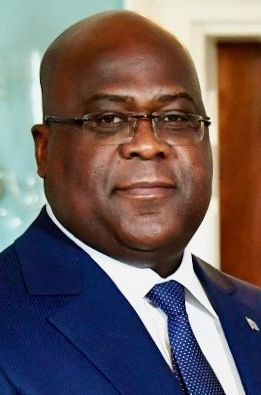
Tshisekedi in 2019

In the lead up the 2018 presidential election, it become clear to all seven major opposition leaders—Jean-Pierre Bemba of the Movement for the Liberation of the Congo (MLC), Martin Fayulu of the Dynamic of the Opposition (DO), Vital Kamerhe of the Union for the Congolese Nation (UNC), former Katanga Province Governor Moise Katumbi, Freddy Matungulu of Our Congo (CNB), former Prime Minister Adolphe Muzito, and Félix Tshisekedi of the Union for Democracy and Social Progress (UDPS)—that the only way to defeat Kabila was to unite behind a single candidate. Several initiatives were launched, and opposition meetings were held in Kinshasa, Brussels, Johannesburg, and Pretoria. These would prove fruitless, however, due to each party's traditional regionalism and the unwillingness of the opposition figures to set aside their personal ambitions for a greater cause.

Following Kabila's ban on Katumbi's return to the country and the issuance of an international arrest warrant against him, as well as the disqualification of Bemba by the CENI for witness tampering at The Hague, the opposition field was left wide open, raising hopes that a unified candidate could emerge.

On 11 November 2018, after a multi-day conference in Geneva supported by the Kofi Annan Foundation, the seven opposition leaders signed an agreement to form a political coalition named "Lamuka" to support their nominee Fayulu, a dark horse pick. The coalition also called on the CENI to take specific measures ahead of the election, including scrapping the use of electronic voting machines, cleaning up the electoral rolls, and easing political tensions to ensure free, transparent, inclusive, and peaceful elections.

In response, rank and file supporters of the UDPS began violent protests in Limete, the party's headquarters, with some even threatening to burn down the hq building. Similar protests by UNC supporters broke out in the Stade des Martyrs. Succumbing to the pressure, both leaders withdrew their signatures in less than 24 hours, with Tshikendi claiming he had been tricked into voting for Fayulu and that his base wanted him to run for president instead. Later, on 23 November, in Nairobi, the leaders agreed to create the Heading for Change coalition and support Tshikendi as its presidential candidate.

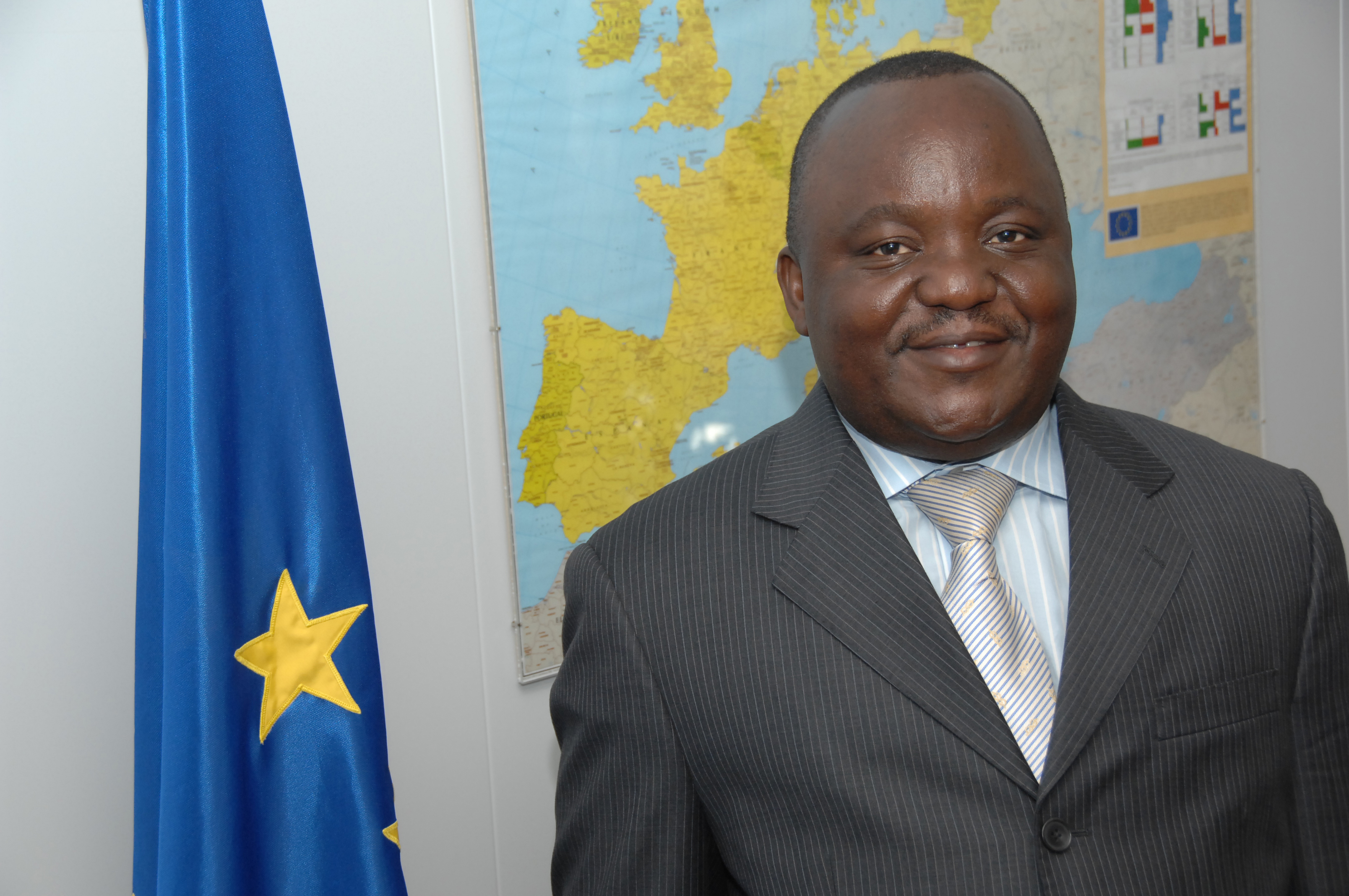
Mbusa in 2007

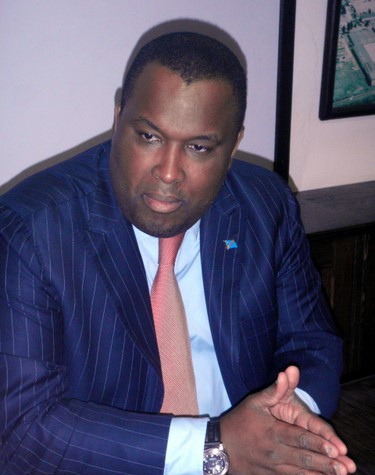
Nzanga Mobutu, son of Mobutu Sese Seko, in 2010

The coalition was later joined by Antipas Mbusa and his Forces for Renewal (RCD/K-ML) on November 19, Jean-Philibert Mabaya and his Rainbow of Congo (ACC) on 3 December, and Nzanga Mobutu and his Zaire group, which included the Union of Mobutist Democrats, on 8 December.

=== 2018 election and aftermath ===
Fayulu would end up placing second behind Tshisekedi, despite most independent observers, including the Catholic Church, believing that Fayulu had actually won in a landslide. They believe that outgoing President Joseph Kabila, realising that a chosen successor candidate couldn't credibly win, struck a deal with Tshisekedi to make him president while Kabila governed jointly with him. Later, a joint investigation by the Financial Times and Radio France Internationale appeared to reveal that massive fraud occurred during the election. FT claimed on 15 January that its analysis of two separate collections of voting data — one from an anonymous person close to Fayulu who said they had obtained it with the help of a whistleblower, representing about 86% of votes cast, and another from the Episcopal Conference (CENCO), which represents all Congolese bishops and fielded 39,824 observers on election day — showed Fayulu as the clear winner of the election.

On 20 January 2019, the Constitutional Court rejected Fayulu's challenge of the election results and upheld Tshisekedi's victory. Fayulu encouraged "peaceful resistance" to obtain the "truth" from the ballot box and demanded the publication of the results "office by office and province by province." In the National Assembly election, Lamuka won 112 seats. In the 2019 elections, Lamuka won six senate seats and one governorship.

=== Tshisekedi presidency ===
On 27 April 2019, the coalition announced that it would transform into a political platform, adopting a rotating presidency with a three-month term for each leader. Katumbi was the first to assume the presidency, followed by a planned succession order of Matungulu, Bemba, Muzito, Mbusa, and Fayulu. Four years later, the CENI refused to recognize Lamuka as a political platform.

On 19 April, an appeals court overturned the dubious, according to Kullenberg, property fraud conviction against Katumbi and his second case for alleged mercenary recruitment a day later, who then returned to the country on 20 May, sparking speculation about whether Tshisekedi and Katumbi would soon cooperate. On 31 May, Mbusa returned to Kinshasa after seven years in exile, but quickly pulled out of Lamuka to focus on supporting the government in addressing the Kivu Ebola epidemic and Kivu conflict. On 11 July, Matungulu accepted his appointment to the board of directors of the African Development Bank by Tshisekedi, leaving the coalition.

Despite these defections, Lamuka members continued to push their shared ideals, though internal divisions deepened over their strategy against Tshisekedi. Moderates Katumbi and, discreetly, Bemba supported a "republican" position, recognizing the legitimacy of government institutions, while Fayulu and Muzito were more radical, continuing to challenge the legitimacy of those institutions.

On 12 October 2020, along with the handover of leadership from Muzito to Fayulu, Lamuka extended the presidential term from three to six months and split membership between founding and associate members.

==== Bemba/Katumbi split ====
In January 2021, the MLC and Katumbi's ENSEMBLE joined Tshisekedi's newly formed Sacred Union of the Nation (USN), a coalition formed to oppose Kabila and his coalition. From then on, confusion arose within the coalition, which split into two camps: Adolphe Muzito and Martin Fayulu, who viewed the USN as a "bought majority" and a "second pregnancy" of the FCC-CACH coalition, on one side, and Moïse Katumbi and Jean-Pierre Bemba on the other. Muzito and Fayulu argued that Bemba and Katumbi had freely left the coalition by joining the USN. However, Katumbi and Bemba maintained that, under Lamuka's governing rules, departure had to be voluntary, something they had never done. Four members of the Lamuka political cell backed up those two, stating that their action with the aim of putting an end to the "Kabilist dictatorship" is in line with Lamuka's objectives.

This imbroglio gave rise to an unprecedented situation on April 10, when Katumbi, supported by Bemba, attempted to take over the coordination in accordance with its rotating presidency on the same day that Fayulu handed over the coordination to Muzito at a ceremonly in Kinshassa, thus resulting in a situation with 2 coordinators claimants where the texts of the coalition only provided for one person to hold the post.

==== Muzito split ====
Along with the withdrawal of members of the presidium, Lamuka has reformed itself by revisiting its charters and, after a long time of being closed, has begun to gradually open up to the addition of several other political parties and personalities.

The falling out between Fayulu and Muzito began in 2022 with the creation of the Patriotic Bloc, a group of citizen forces and opposition political parties that demanded consensual electoral reforms before the 2023 elections. Among those Fayulu allowed to join was the FFC, a move that Muzito later criticised.

My party and I said "no" to this Patriotic Bloc because we believe that we cannot rely on the one who committed the sin to fight the one who profited from the sin. Therefore, we believe that the FCC are not the appropriate allies to fight against electoral fraud and for the truth of the ballot boxes, because they are the ones at the root of it. This, moreover, is what causes the divergence between Ecidé and New Momentum, between Martin Fayulu and me. Obviously, it is a divergence that can be overcome, I hope, because we must maintain Lamuka as a force of resistance.

— Muzito, rfi interview

Fayulu supporters were surprised by Muzito's opposition, recalling that his party, New Momentum (NOU.EL), had been a signatory of the first public declaration of the Patriotic Bloc and that its members even participated in the first march organized by the movement.

Furthermore, the announcement of both leaders to join the presidential race was another point of contention, along with the interpretation of Lamuka's objectives. Fayulu supporters believed that the coalition had been an electoral platform since April 2019, while NOU.EL considered Lamuka to be merely a force for protest, a space for resistance, and that the electoral issue was for later. For some time, the two leaders operated separately, each conducting their activities in the name of their political party, only sometimes using the Lamuka label.

On 31 March 2023, Fayulu announced in a press release that Muzito and NOU.EL had lost the legitimacy to speak in the name and on behalf of Lamuka, citing a correspondence from 22 December 2022, in which Muzito informed him of his voluntary withdrawal from the platform's presidency. In response, the next day, the secretary general of NOU.EL, Blanchard Mongomba, accused Fayulu of fraud, lying, and cheating, insisting that the party would not relinquish its responsibilities as co-founder of Lamuka. Mongomba further accused Fayulu of having already turned his back on the fight for truth at the ballot box when he declared that he had forgiven those who stole power from the Congolese people in 2018. That same week, Fayulu handed over the position of coordinator to Professor Matthieu Kalele Ka-Bila before Muzito was scheduled to take over, having been admitted to the presidium through cooptation. In turn, on 11 April, Muzito claimed to take over the reins, with Mongomba calling Fayulu's actions an act of rebellion and claiming that Fayulu had self-excluded himself from Lamuka. That month, Muzito and his party abandoned the coalition.

=== 2023 election and aftermath ===
On 19 June, Fayulu and his party stated that they would not submit any candidacies for the 2023 elections at any level. The coalition as a whole did the same. Later, on Stepember 30, after receiving numerous recommendations from his inner circle, Fayulu entered the presidential race with the backing of Lamuka.

Following the election, Faustin Kwakwa, the electoral operations coordinator of Lamuka, called for cancellation of the elections due to fraud and cheating.

== Members ==
=== Current ===
- ECiDé
- Action for Democracy and Development of Congo (ADD Congo) led by Prince Epenge
- Seth Kikuni
- Simon Mboso
- Others

=== Former ===
- UDPS (until 2018)
- UNC (until 2018)
- RCD/K-ML (until 2019)
- CNB (until 2019)
- ENSEMBLE (until 2021)
- MLC (until 2021)
- NOU.EL (until 2023)
