= Sacred Union of the Nation =

Parliamentary coalition in the Democratic Republic of the Congo

- Leader: Félix Tshisekedi
- Founded: December 6, 2020
- Ideology: Anti-Kabila; Big tent Populism
- Political position: Centre; Factions: Left-wing and right-wing
- Senate: 95 / 109
- National Assembly: 454 / 500

The Sacred Union of the Nation (French: Union sacrée de la nation; USN) is the ruling parliamentary coalition within the Democratic Republic of the Congo. It was formed in December 2020 by Felix Tshisekedi following a falling out between the Heading for Change coalition and Joseph Kabila's Common Front for Congo. After the subsequent four-month-long power struggle, the coalition was able to take control of the government in April 2021. By June 2023, the coalition was made up of 391 members in parliament coming from 24 different political parties. Following its first general, senate, and special elections, as of December 2024, the coalition member parties hold 454 seats in the National Assembly and 95 in the Senate.

Membership in the Sacred Union is often due to strategic and political motivations rather than ideological similarities with President Tshisekedi and his party. Nonetheless, the coalition maintains a set of goals including security (mainly in the east), investment in infrastructure, promotion of the rule of law, improving its citizens' lives, and implementing electoral reform.

== Background ==
=== 2018 election ===
In 2018, the Democratic Republic of the Congo (DRC) held a long overdue presidential election. The outcome of this election, which became a subject of widespread controversy, ultimately led to the assumption of power by Felix Tshisekedi in January 2019. It is widely speculated that Tshisekedi entered into a secret agreement with outgoing president, Joseph Kabila, just eight days prior to the official release of the election results, to overturn the election.

The secret agreement between Tshisekedi and Kabila allowed for the latter to retained significant control over governmental decision-making processes through his coalition the Common Front for Congo (FCC). Furthermore, the agreement granted immunity to Kabila and his allies, shielding them from legal repercussions, while also bestowing upon the FCC the authority to appoint important ministerial positions. Consequently, this arrangement left Tshisekedi and his coalition, the Heading for Change (CACH), with limited sway over the national assembly and the senate, both of which were predominantly dominated by the FCC.

Challenging the legitimacy of Tshisekedi's victory, the Episcopal Conference of the Democratic Republic of the Congo asserted that the true winner of the election was Martin Fayulu, thereby casting doubt on the credibility of the electoral process.

=== Tshisekedi-Kabila split ===
Much like previous power-sharing deals, the CAHA-FCC alliance proved to be ineffective in providing national security and addressing the economic challenges faced by the country such as the poor living conditions. The alliance encountered significant internal conflicts, which emerged when Tshisekedi made critical appointments to military leadership and civilian courts without seeking the endorsement of the FCC. Furthermore, Tshisekedi's decision to appoint two constitutional court judges that were rejected by the FCC further intensified the disagreements.

Another point of conflict centered around the appointment of Ronsard Malonda as the head of the Independent National Electoral Commission by the national assembly without obtaining the consent of President Tshisekedi.

The FCC strongly believed that Tshisekedi's appointments were a deliberate attempt to consolidate his power and distance himself from the coalition before the upcoming 2023 elections. Tshisekedi, on the other hand, held the view that the FCC was impeding the progress of his reform agenda. Consequently, he made the decision to form his own coalition, presumably with the aim of advancing his policy objectives independently.

== History ==
=== Formation ===
On 6 December 2020, following extensive consultations with political parties and influential figures, Tshisekedi declared in an address to the nation that he planned to split off from the FCC and form a new coalition. This decision was met with skepticism, as many considered it to be a risky endeavor that was bound to fail. However, to ensure the success of his new coalition, Tshisekedi employed a persuasive tactic. He issued a warning that if he did not garner enough members to join his coalition, he would dissolve the parliament altogether. This threat created a sense of urgency among the members of parliament, who were concerned about the possibility of losing their jobs in a new election. Consequently, several MPs chose to switch their allegiance to Tshisekedi's newly formed coalition.

Additionally, there were individuals who opted to align themselves with the new coalition in exchange for various benefits. Some were enticed by the prospect of gaining new positions within the government, while others were promised that their interests would be safeguarded and looked after.

=== Government ===
The president now has the constitutional court he wanted, the parliament he wanted, the same goes for the Senate, the prime minister and the government. It remains to be seen what he can do with them and how our citizens will respond.

— Civil society actor in Kinshasa,

In April 2021, the coalition was finally sworn into government with the approval of 412 members of parliament. The 57-member cabinet notably included 14 women and included a mix of young leaders and established political actors and allies.

In 2022, 14 of the 26 governors, most of whom were members of the FCC, were dismissed by their respective provincial assemblies, which had become predominantly controlled by the Sacred Union. The special elections for the newly vacant positions were marked with irregularities and ended with the Sacred Union gaining control of 12 of the 14 governorships up for election. Controversially, the election in Tshopo resulted in a tie but due to election laws the older candidate, who happened to be a member of the Sacred Union, was declared the winner. The Kisangani Court of Appeals later overturned this decision and forced another election ending with a victory for an independent candidate.

== Electoral history ==
=== Gubernatorial elections ===
Election	Seats	+/–	Position
2022 special elections	11 / 14	▲11	▲1st

== Members ==
497 political parties/groups are signatory members of the USN Charter.

=== Parties in government ===
- UDPS/TSHISEKEDI
- Alliance of Democratic Forces of Congo
- A/A-Union for the Congolese Nation
- AB
- 2A/TDC
- AAAP
- A/B50
- Movement for the Liberation of the Congo
- AACPG
- 4AC
- A24
- ANB
- AA/C
- CODE
- AACRD
- ACP-A
- AAD-A
- AUN
- AABG
- AV
- A3A
- AAeC
- AN
- AAC/PALU
- AMSC
- ATUA
- AVC-A
- AE
- FPAU
- A1
- A25
- A/VK2018
- UDPS/KIBASSA-A
- APA/MLC
- A2R
- APCF
- AEDC-A
- AADC-A
- AAAD
- ARDEV-A
- CDER
- CFC
- MSL

=== Former ===
- Alliance of Democrats
- National Conscience
- Together for the Republic
