= Tryphon Kin-Kiey Mulumba =

Congolese politician

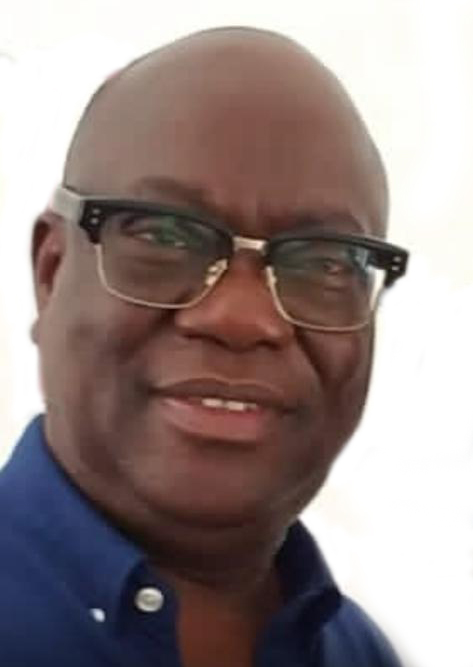

Tryphon Kin-Kiey Mulumba (born 4 September 1949, in Kindambi, Belgian Congo) is a Congolese politician. He was formerly the Minister of Relations with Parliament and the Minister of Post and Telecommunications in the government of Prime Minister Matata Ponyo Mapon. In 2018 Mulumba was a presidential candidate in the 2018 Democratic Republic of the Congo general election. He was also previously in the National Assembly since the 2006 election representing the Bandundu Province, ending his term after the 2011 election. He has always been a close supporter of President Joseph Kabila, but in 2018 chose to run against Kabila's chosen candidate, Emmanuel Ramazani Shadary.
