= Common Front for Congo =

Political coalition in the Democratic Republic of the Congo

Common Front for Congo Front commun pour le Congo
- Leader: Joseph Kabila
- Merger of: PPRD; ATD
- Preceded by: Alliance of the Presidential Majority

The Common Front for Congo (French: Front commun pour le Congo; FCC), also known as the Kabila Coalition, is a parliamentary group within the parliament of the Democratic Republic of the Congo (DRC) that is predominantly made up of the People's Party for Reconstruction and Democracy (PPRD). It was formed in June 2018 by Joseph Kabila to organise political forces for the 2018 presidential election and acts as the successor to the Alliance of the Presidential Majority.

Following the 2018 election, the FCC held a majority within both the National Assembly and Senate until 2021 after a fallout between the FCC and Felix Tshisekedi's Heading for Change (CACH).

== History ==
=== 2018 Election ===
On June 7, 2018, Joseph Kabila, then President of the DRC, formed the FCC as a coalition of individuals who shared Kabila's vision for the country and pledged their support for him in the upcoming presidential election. It succeeded the Alliance of the Presidential Majority and aimed to enhance the social conditions within the nation.

A few months later, the DRC held the long overdue presidential election. The outcome of this election, which became a subject of widespread controversy, ultimately led to the assumption of power by Felix Tshisekedi, a member of the Heading for Change (CACH), in January 2019. It is widely speculated that Tshisekedi entered into a secret agreement with outgoing president, Joseph Kabila, just eight days prior to the official release of the election results, to overturn the election.

Simultaneously, the FCC secured a significant victory in the National Assembly elections, winning 342 out of the 500 available seats. It also obtained overwhelming majorities in most of the provincial governments.

The secret agreement between Tshisekedi and Kabila allowed for the ladder to retained significant control over governmental decision-making processes through his party the FCC. Furthermore, the agreement granted immunity to Kabila and his allies, shielding them from legal repercussions, while also bestowing upon the FCC the authority to appoint important ministerial positions. Consequently, this arrangement left Tshisekedi and his coalition with limited sway over the national assembly and the senate, both of which had become dominated by the FCC.

=== Government ===
Following the election, it took a span of five months for the FCC and CACH to reach a consensus on appointing Sylvestre Ilunga as the new prime minister. Ilunga formed a cabinet consisting of 65 members, with the majority of 42 seats being allocated to FCC candidates. Notably, the ministries of Defense, Justice, and Finance were controlled by the Kabila coalition.

Much like previous power-sharing deals, the CAHA-FCC alliance proved to be ineffective in providing national security and addressing the economic challenges faced by the country such as its people's poor living conditions. The alliance encountered significant internal conflicts, which emerged when Tshisekedi made critical appointments to military leadership and civilian courts without seeking the endorsement of the FCC. Furthermore, Tshisekedi's decision to appoint two constitutional court judges that were rejected by the FCC further intensified the disagreements.

Another point of conflict centered around the appointment of Ronsard Malonda as the head of the Independent National Electoral Commission by the national assembly without obtaining the consent of President Tshisekedi.

The FCC strongly believed that Tshisekedi's appointments were a deliberate attempt to consolidate his power and distance himself from the coalition before the upcoming 2023 elections. Tshisekedi, on the other hand, held the view that the FCC was impeding the progress of his reform agenda. Consequently, he made the decision to form his own coalition, presumably with the aim of advancing his policy objectives independently.

=== Opposition ===
On 6 December 2020, following extensive consultations with political parties and influential figures, Tshisekedi declared in an address to the nation that he planned to split off from the FCC and form a new coalition. This decision was met with skepticism, as many considered it to be a risky endeavor that was bound to fail. However, to ensure the success of his new coalition, Tshisekedi employed a persuasive tactic. He issued a warning that if he did not garner enough members to join his coalition, he would dissolve the parliament altogether. This threat created a sense of urgency among the members of parliament, who were concerned about the possibility of losing their jobs in a new election.

Additionally, there were individuals who opted to align themselves with the new coalition in exchange for various benefits. Some were enticed by the prospect of gaining new positions within the government, while others were promised that their interests would be safeguarded and looked after.

In a relatively short period, Tshisekedi managed to persuade numerous deputies from the FCC to join the newly formed coalition, which was named the Sacred Union. Leveraging their newfound majority, the Sacred Union successfully displaced the presidents of both the National Assembly and the Senate, as well as Prime Minister Ilunga and his administration. By April 2021, the Sacred Union had established a new government with Prime Minister Lukonde as its head, officially designating the FCC as the opposition.

In 2022, 14 governors, most of whom were members of the FCC, faced dismissal by their respective local assemblies, which were predominantly controlled by the Sacred Union. The elections for the newly vacant positions were marked with irregularities and ended with the FCC keeping only one governorship while the Sacred Union gained 11.

== Electoral history ==
=== Presidency ===
Presidency of DR Congo
Election year	Candidate	First Round	
Election year	Candidate	# of overall votes	% of overall vote
2018	Emmanuel Ramazani Shadary	4,357,359	23.8% (#3)

=== Senate ===
Year	Vote percent	Seats won
2019		99 / 109

=== National Assembly ===
Year	Vote percent	Seats won
2018		341 / 500

=== Gubernatorial elections ===
Election	Seats	+/–	Position
2022	1 / 14	▼13	▼2nd
