= Alain Daniel Shekomba =

Congolese businessman and politician

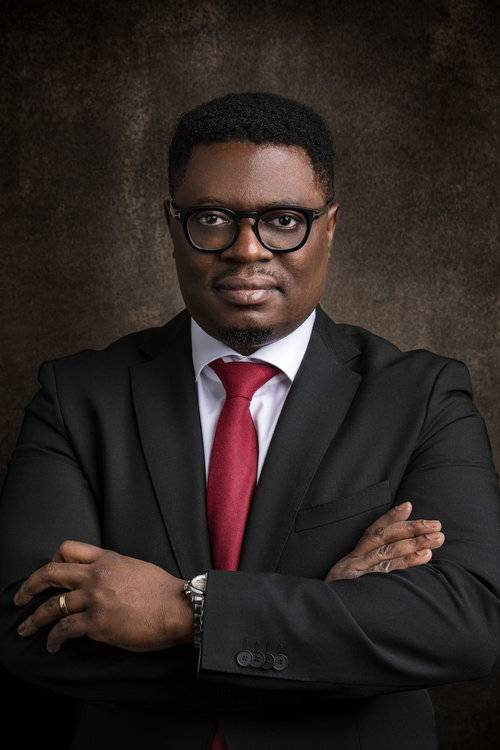
Alain Daniel Shekomba

Alain Daniel Shekomba Okende (born 13 April 1970, Kananga) is a Congolese physicist, businessman, and politician. Formerly a professor at the University of Kinshasa, where he had been a student. He was a presidential candidate in the 2018 Democratic Republic of the Congo general election.
