= 2018 Democratic Republic of the Congo general election =

- 30 December 2018
- Presidential election
- Turnout: 47.57%
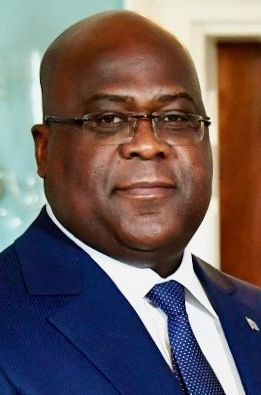

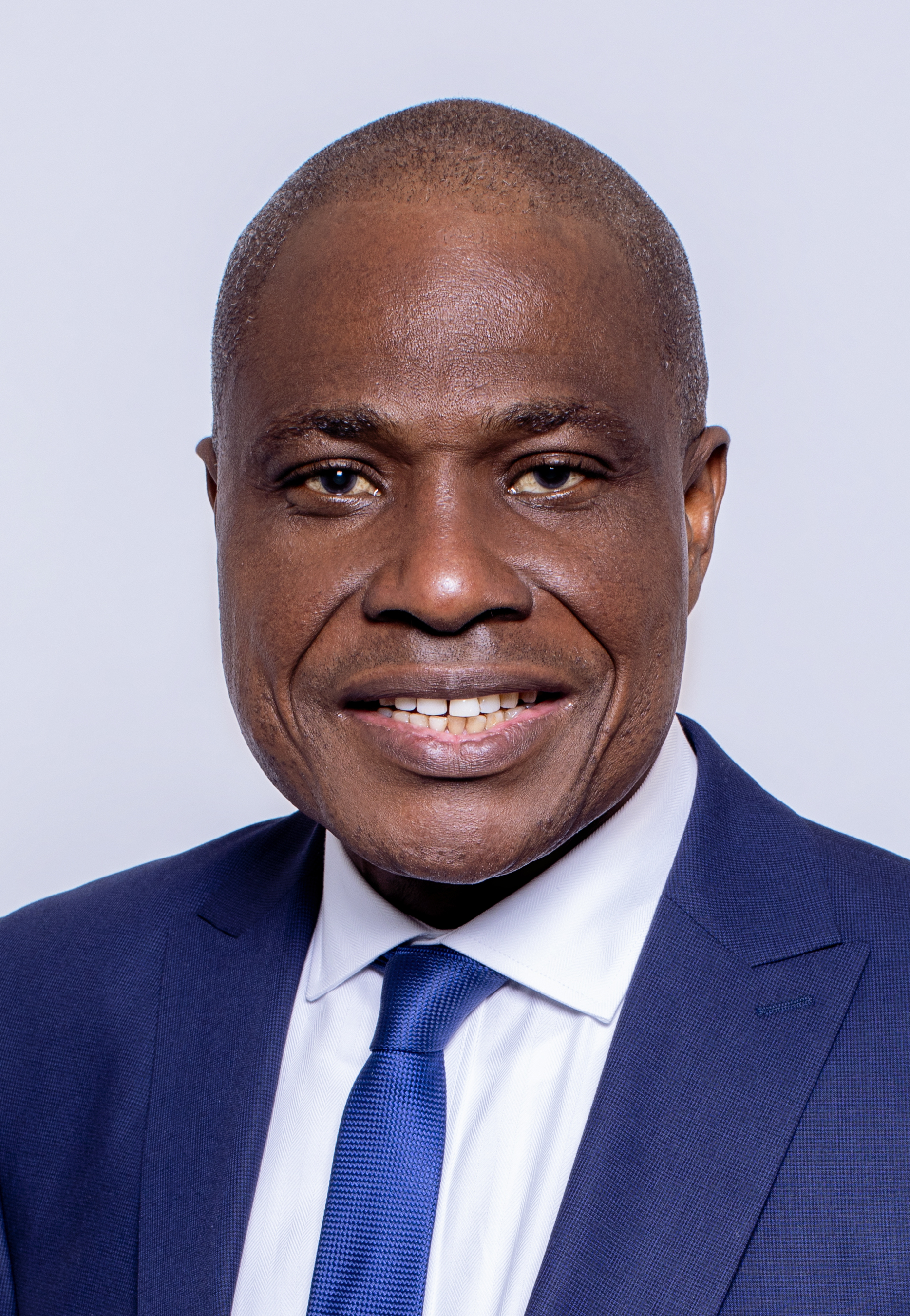

Nominee	Félix Tshisekedi	Martin Fayulu	Emmanuel Ramazani Shadary
Party	UDPS	DO	Independent
Alliance	CACH	Lamuka	FCC
Popular vote	7,051,013	6,366,732	4,357,359
Percentage	38.56%	34.82%	23.83%
President before election
Joseph Kabila
PPRD
Elected President
Félix Tshisekedi
UDPS (CACH)
- Legislative election
- 500 seats of the National Assembly; 251 seats needed for a majority
Composition of the National Assembly after the election
Prime Minister before	Prime Minister after
Bruno Tshibala; UDPS	Sylvestre Ilunga; PPRD (FCC)

General elections were held in the Democratic Republic of the Congo on 30 December 2018 to determine a successor to outgoing president Joseph Kabila, as well as for the 500 seats of the National Assembly and the 715 elected seats of the 26 provincial assemblies. Félix Tshisekedi of the Union for Democracy and Social Progress won the presidency with 38.6% of the vote, defeating Martin Fayulu of the Dynamic of the Opposition and independent candidate Emmanuel Ramazani Shadary. Fayulu alleged that the vote was rigged against him by Tshisekedi and Kabila, challenging the result in the Constitutional Court. Election observers, including the Catholic Church, also cast doubt on the official result. Nonetheless, on 20 January the Court declared Tshisekedi the winner. Parties supporting Kabila won the majority of seats in the National Assembly. Tshisekedi was sworn in as the fifth president of the Democratic Republic of the Congo on 24 January 2019, the first peaceful transition of power in the country since its independence from Belgium in 1960.

According to the constitution, the second and final term of President Kabila expired on 20 December 2016. General elections were originally scheduled for 27 November 2016, but were delayed with a promise to hold them by the end of 2017. This promise was subsequently broken, but after both international and internal pressure the elections were finally scheduled for 23 December 2018. They were, however, postponed for a week on 30 December 2018 due to a fire in the electoral commission's warehouse in Kinshasa destroying 8,000 electronic voting machines.

Incumbent President Kabila was constitutionally ineligible for a third term. He and his party, the People's Party for Reconstruction and Democracy, supported the candidacy of Emmanuel Ramazani Shadary, the former Minister of the Interior, who formally ran as an independent candidate. In opposition to Shadary's candidacy, seven opposition leaders, including Jean-Pierre Bemba and Moïse Katumbi, nominated Martin Fayulu as their candidate for president. However, Félix Tshisekedi and Vital Kamerhe soon after broke this agreement and agreed that Tshisekedi should run for president while Kamerhe would serve as his campaign manager and become prime minister if he won. They also agreed that Tshisekedi and his party will back a candidate from Kamerhe's Union for the Congolese Nation in the 2023 general election.

Preliminary results were scheduled to be announced on 6 January 2019, with the final result on 15 January and the inauguration of the next president on 18 January. However, it was later announced on 5 January that the publication of preliminary results would be delayed, as less than half of the votes have been obtained by the electoral commission. On 10 January the commission declared Félix Tshisekedi, leader of the Union for Democracy and Social Progress opposition party, the winner of the election. Martin Fayulu, who came in second, has claimed that the election was rigged and that he will challenge the result in the DRC's Constitutional Court. The country's influential Roman Catholic Church, which deployed 40,000 election monitors, has also said the official result does not align with its observations, which place Fayulu as the winner. On 12 January it became known that parties supporting Joseph Kabila won the majority of seats in the National Assembly. The Constitutional Court announced on 14 January that it would review Fayulu's appeal of the result, and would make a ruling on 19 January. That day, the Constitutional Court rejected Fayulu's challenge of the election results and upheld Tshisekedi's victory. Fayulu claimed to be the "legitimate" president and called for protests.

While Tshisekedi had won the election, parties aligned with Kabila secured a majority in the National Assembly and later in the Senate during the March 2019 Senate election. Because of this Tshisekedi's ability to implement policies or appoint a new Prime Minister were limited, and while negotiations have been ongoing to form a new government the President has been working with the former cabinet of Kabila. It was not until 20 May 2019 that he appointed Kabila ally and career bureaucrat Sylvestre Ilunga as his designate for prime minister. The parliamentary majority faction and President Tshisekedi came to an agreement on forming a new government by 27 July 2019, choosing the 65 members of the new cabinet. Out of those, 42 posts went to the Kabila-aligned Common Front for Congo candidates, while 23 went to the Heading for Change coalition (Tshisekedi's alliance). The new Ilunga government formally took office in late August 2019.

== Background ==
=== Glissement ===
==== 2014 ====
From 2014, the question of whether Kabila would run for a third term and if elections were even going to be held, were the biggest political issues in the country. From 2015, this process of the government attempting to delay elections in order to hold on to power became known as glissement (sliding).

While the Constitution explicitly limited the presidency to two terms and prohibited any amendments to extend this limit, discussions persisted throughout the year about various ways to prolong Kabila's rule, including potential constitutional revisions. Supporters and opponents of a third term were found within both the government and the opposition. Among the most vocal proponents of an extension were Evariste Boshab, the head of Kabila's People's Party for Reconstruction and Democracy (PPRD), Monseigneur Marini Bodho, head of the Church of Christ in the Congo, and Minister of Transport and Channels of Communication Kin-Kiey Mulumba. While Senate President Léon Kengo wa Dondo and the Episcopal Conference of the Democratic Republic of the Congo (CENCO) openly opposed revisions to the constitution. Kabila himself never took a position but the reorganization in the military to allow for closer personal control over the armed forces, as well as the establishment of a government of national cohesion that stregenthened his Alliance of the Presidential Majority (AMP) coalition, while also giving the political opposition some high-ranking positions in an attempt to statify them, suggested he supported it, especially since all key positions related to the question of a third term for Kabila were filled by loyalists.

In response to suggested revisions, the opposition launched a coalition under the slogan "Don't touch my constitution", organizing demonstration in Kinshasa that included the Union for the Congolese Nation (UNC) and the Union for Democracy and Social Progress (UDPS) on 4 August 2014. Following the demonstrations, UNC General Secretary Jean-Bertrand Ewanga was arrested and sentenced to one year in prison for contempt of state institutions. The opposition expanded in September when approximately 650 Congolese NGOs signed a declaration against constitutional amendments, prompting further street protests.

Tensions escalated after the Independent National Electoral Commission (CENI) released the first part of its electoral calendar on 26 May, which lacked any mention of legislative and presidential elections, only local. Although the opposition had long urged the government to fulfill its 2006 promise of organizing local elections, they feared that holding them in 2015 would become an excuse to delay the national elections in 2016 due to financial and logistical challenges.

Another controversy arose in November with the creation of the National Population Identification Office (ONIP), tasked with conducting a national census, a measure previously recommended in 2013. ONIP director Adolphe Lumanu estimated that the census would take one year and cost approximately $500 million, with Export–Import Bank of China financing the effort. The opposition was skeptical of this, arguing that logistical and financial hurdles could prolong the process for years, which they feared would be used as another justification to prolong the election process.

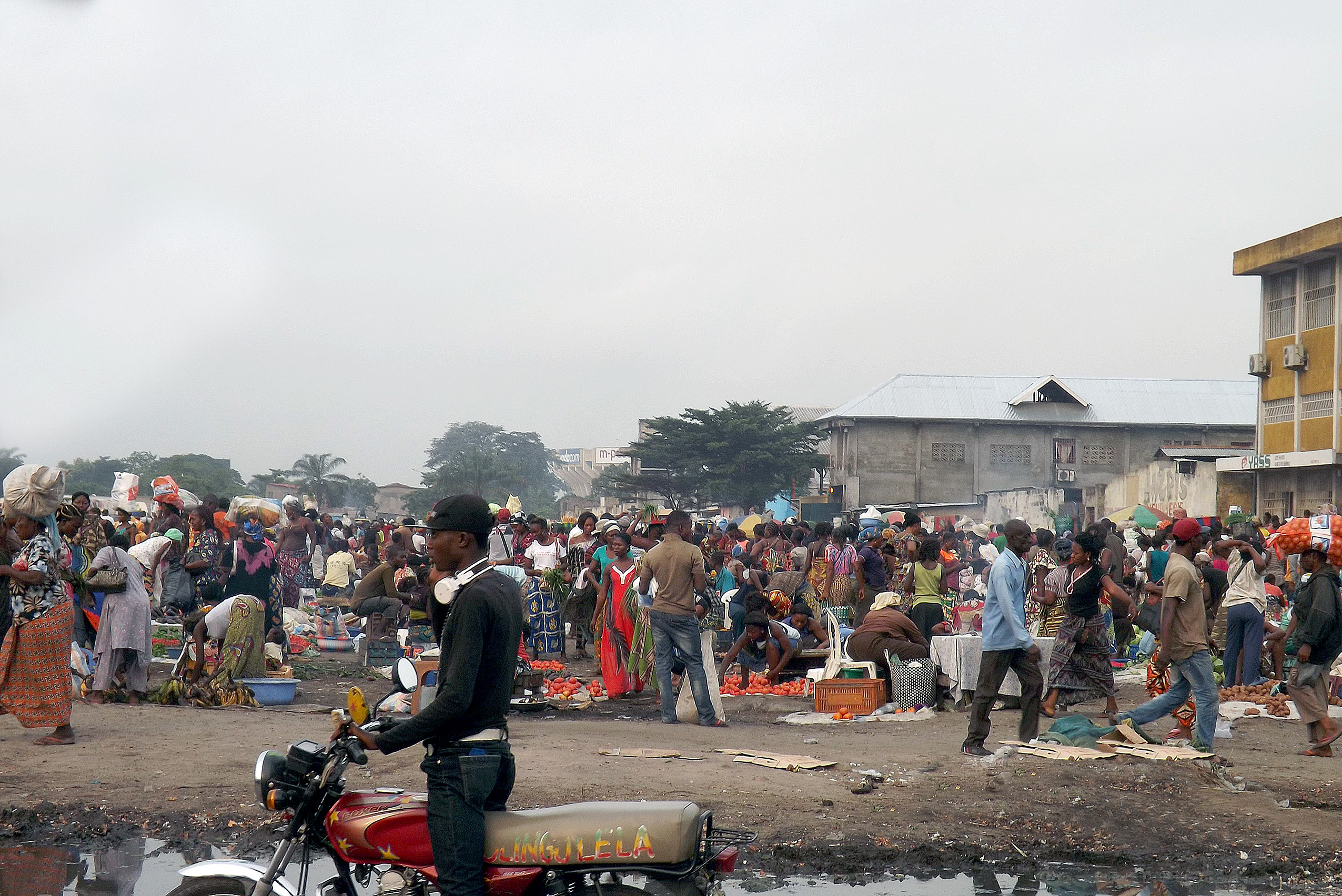
Resumption of activities on 24 January 2015 after a few days of tensions in the Congolese capital

Despite mounting concerns, Kabila sought to reassure critics and international partners, stating on 15 December that elections would proceed as planned for 27 November 2016 In January 2015, attempts to tie voter registration updates for the 2016 elections to a national census or other demographic data in an electoral bill were shot down by members of the AMP. However, additions that were made by the Senate to make explicit reference to the constitutional time frame as binding were also removed, thereby removing a stipulation that Kabila would have to leave office in 2016.

==== 2015 ====
Throughout 2015, speculation over election delays and Kabila's potential third term continued to dominate politics, causing mass protests in Kinshasa and other cities. While government spokesman Lambert Mende Omalanga repeatedly assured the public that Kabila would respect the Constitution, AMP spokesman André Alain Atundu stated on 31 October that holding credible elections under the current conditions was impossible and could be delayed by up to four years. The government quickly distanced itself from this claim but did not dismiss the need for a postponement. On 16 February, the CENI set national elections for 27 November 2016, with provincial and municipal elections scheduled for October 2015 and various local elections throughout 2016.

On 5 March, some AMP members issued an open letter urging Kabila to step down and expressing concerns over potential election delays. In mid-September, seven party leaders who had written the letter broke away from the AMP and formed a new opposition group known as the G7, which controlled around 80 seats in the National Assembly, roughly a third of AMP's majority. On 14 September, the G7 published a second letter, accusing Kabila of deliberately sowing confusion to extend his rule. Shortly after, the seven parties were expelled from the AMP, and by late September, their ministers were dismissed from government. The G7 quickly became a key opposition force, announcing in October that it considered Moïse Katumbi, former governor of Katanga and, until recently, a close Kabila ally before his resignation from the PPRD on 29 September, a potential opposition presidential candidate. Just before the end of Katumbi's term. Kabila's special advisor for good governance and the fight against corruption, Luzolo Bambi Lessa, requested an investigation into alleged fraud involving Katumbi and 19 other officials. Human rights activists denounced the move as politically motivated, warning of corruption trials being used as a tool against political opponents.

The establishment of a Constitutional Court in April, a body that could theoretically judge the president, while welcomed civil society activists, was questioned over its independence. This new court replaced the function of the Supreme Court of Justice in presidential elections, which had repeatedly come under criticism, particularly for its handling of the 2011 elections. In its first ruling on 8 September, the Constitutional Court ruled that the electoral calendar set by the CENI was financially and politically unfeasible, a ruling that was heavily criticised. After the court ruling, the provincial and local elections originally scheduled for 25 October were scrapped without much comment from the government.

On 26 September, the press reported on a proposed law aimed at regulating referendums, introduced a few days earlier by two AMP MPs. While the government insisted that the legislation was merely intended to establish clear procedures for referendums as there was supposedly a legal loophole and that there were no immediate plans to hold one, the proposal sparked significant backlash from the opposition and civil society who once again saw it as another attempt by Kabila to make a constitutional change for a third term.

Adding to the already turbulent electoral process, CENI President Apollinaire Malu Malu, a generally considered honest administrator who oversaw the widely regarded free and fair 2006 elections but was not involved in the controversial 2011 elections, and his deputy, André Mpungwe both resigned in October, citing health concerns and personal reasons respectively. Critics feared that pressures by Kabila were the true reason for their departure. Further resignations followed in early November when Chantal Ngoy Thite, CENI's treasurer and a member of a G7 party, stepped down. On 16 November, Kabila appointed AMP affiliates to fill these positions, with Corneille Nangaa, a future rebel leader who would go on to claim he rigged the election, being appointed as the new CENI president.

Facing mounting pressure, Kabila addressed the nation on 28 November, calling for a national dialogue to ensure a peaceful electoral process. He announced a preparatory committee but provided no details on its composition or timeline. While he agreed to the possibility of an international mediator, he stated that intervention would occur only if major issues arose. His suggestion to consider a less costly electoral system raised opposition concerns that he aimed to amend the Constitution to allow an indirect presidential election, potentially enabling him to remain in power, similar to Angolan President José Eduardo dos Santos. Major opposition parties decried this effort as manipulation by the government, and so the talks failed.

On 19 December, opposition parties and civil society organizations formed the Citizen Front 2016. However, despite this collaboration, the opposition remained divided. Within the largest opposition party, the UDPS, internal conflicts were ongoing on whether to engage in dialogue and potentially join a future national unity government. Tshisekedi's son, Félix, and his supporters advocated for participation in talks, while many party officials and grassroots members remained deeply distrustful of Kabila's government and opposed any negotiations.

=== 2016 ===
Throughout the year, actors called for inclusive talks and various, partly overlapping, attempts at dialogue, with them being repeatedly rejected, boycotted, and re-started. Government actions such as police attacking opposition headquarters, tear gassing, arresting, and killing protesters further undermined the prospects for serious talks.

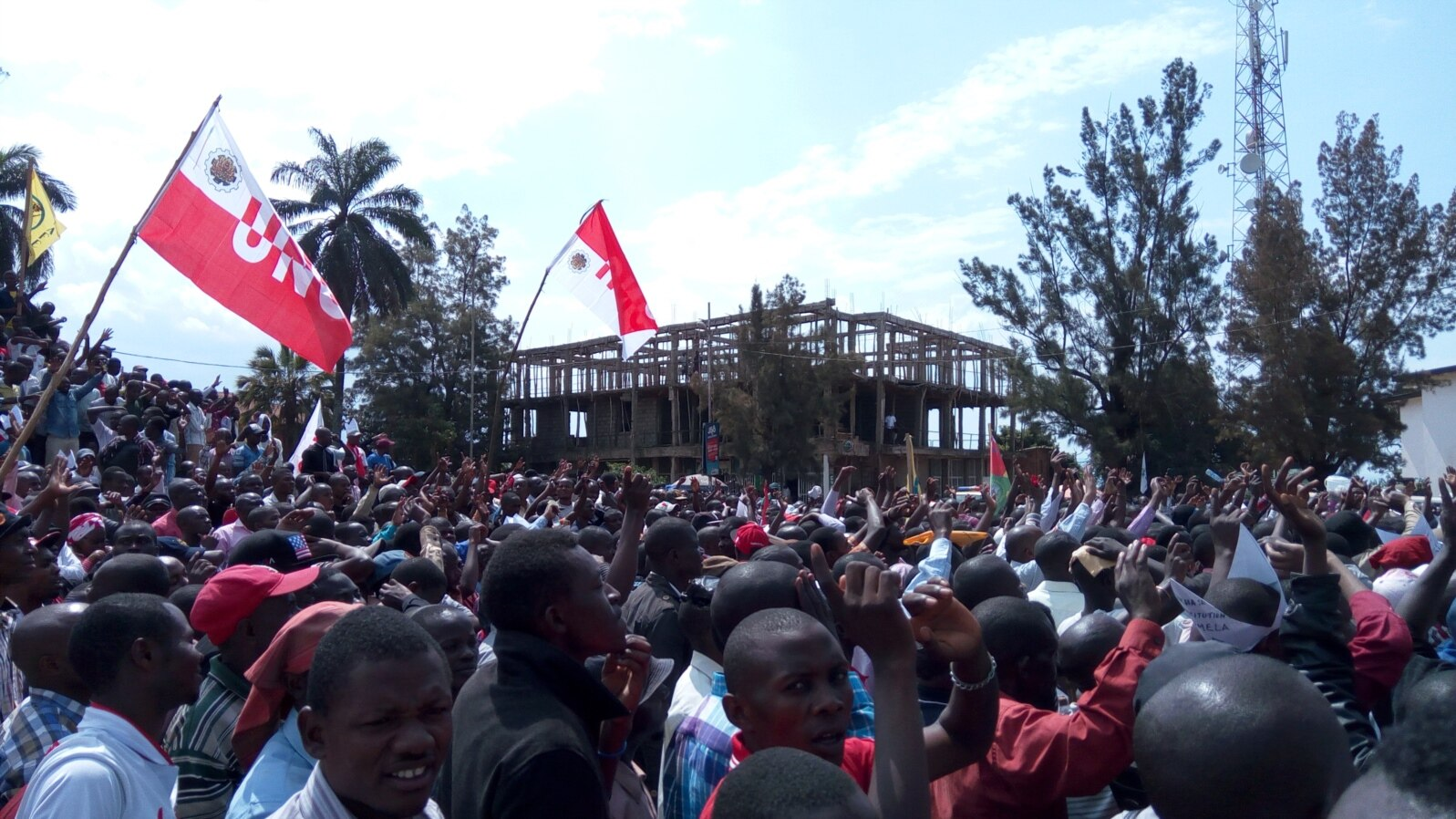
Protesters raise their hands to say no to a third term for President Joseph Kabila, in Bukavu, 26 May.

On 4 May, Justice Minister Alexis Thambwe Mwamba launched an investigation into claims that Katumbi had hired foreign mercenaries, including US citizens, the same day that Katumbi made his candidacy official. Summoned to court in Lubumbashi days later, he appeared alongside several opposition figures. His court appearances over the following days sparked large protests, leading to clashes between his supporters and the police. On 13 May, Katumbi was hospitalized due to tear gas exposure during the unrest. Five days later, an arrest warrant was issued against him, but he was granted leave from the country for medical treatment. Katumbi immediately departed for South Africa, remaining in exile while continuing his political activities. On 22 June, he was sentenced in absentia to three years in prison and fined $6 million for real-estate fraud. An investigation by the CENCO into these convictions was leaked to the press on 4 May 2017, confirming the political nature of the cases. In response, the government opened a third case against Katumbi on 13 May for alleged tax evasion.

On 11 May 2016, in a ruling that would become known as the glissement ruling, the constitutional court ruled that Kabila could remain president if elections did not take place within the limits of the constitutionally prescribed delay, a move seen by the opposition and observers as one to delay the elections. The opposition argued that an interim president should be installed after the expiration of Kabila's term on 19 December, with Denis Mukwege being thrown around as a possible name.

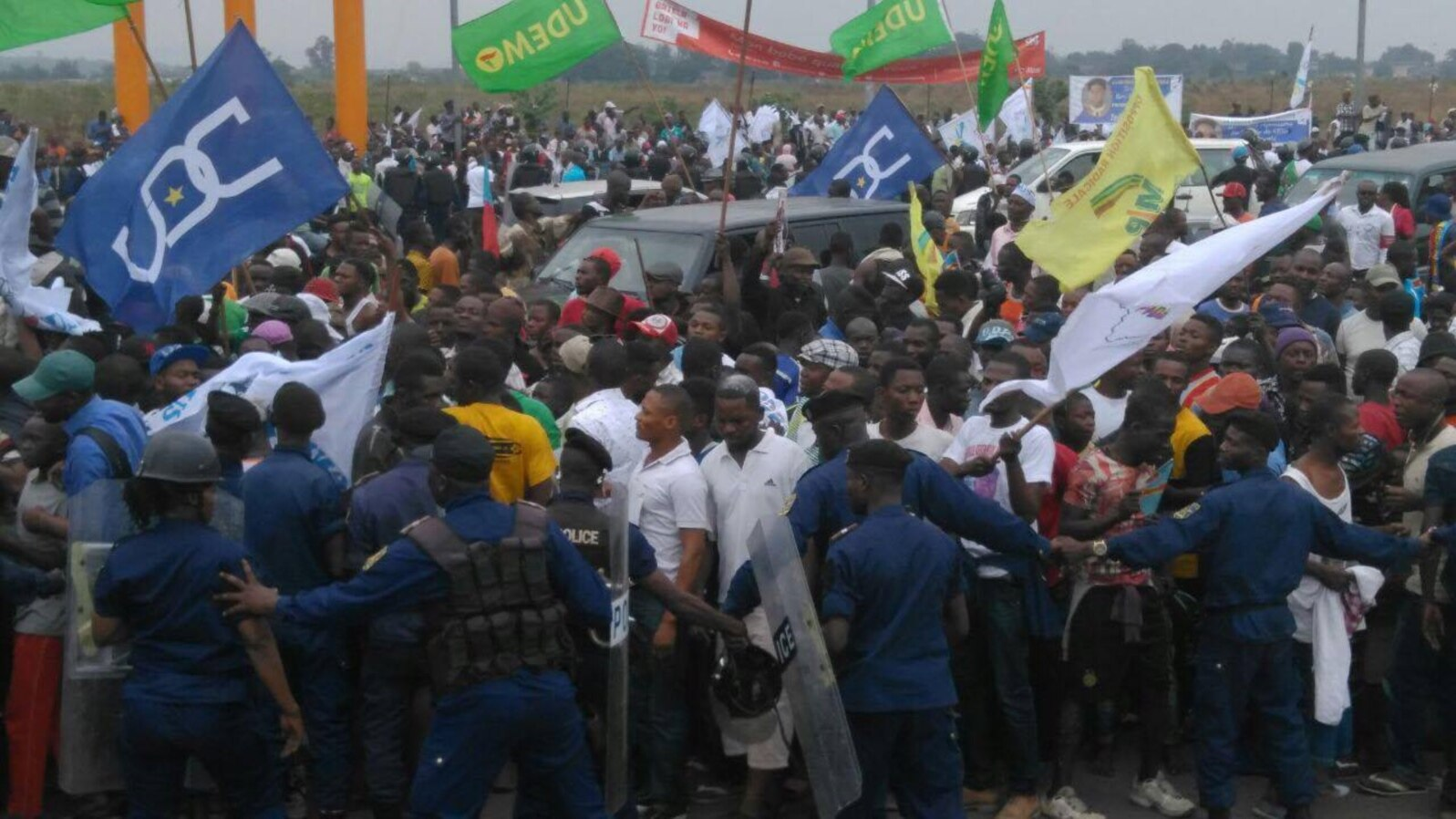
Etienne Tshisekedi's supporters at the airport for his arrival on 27 July 2016

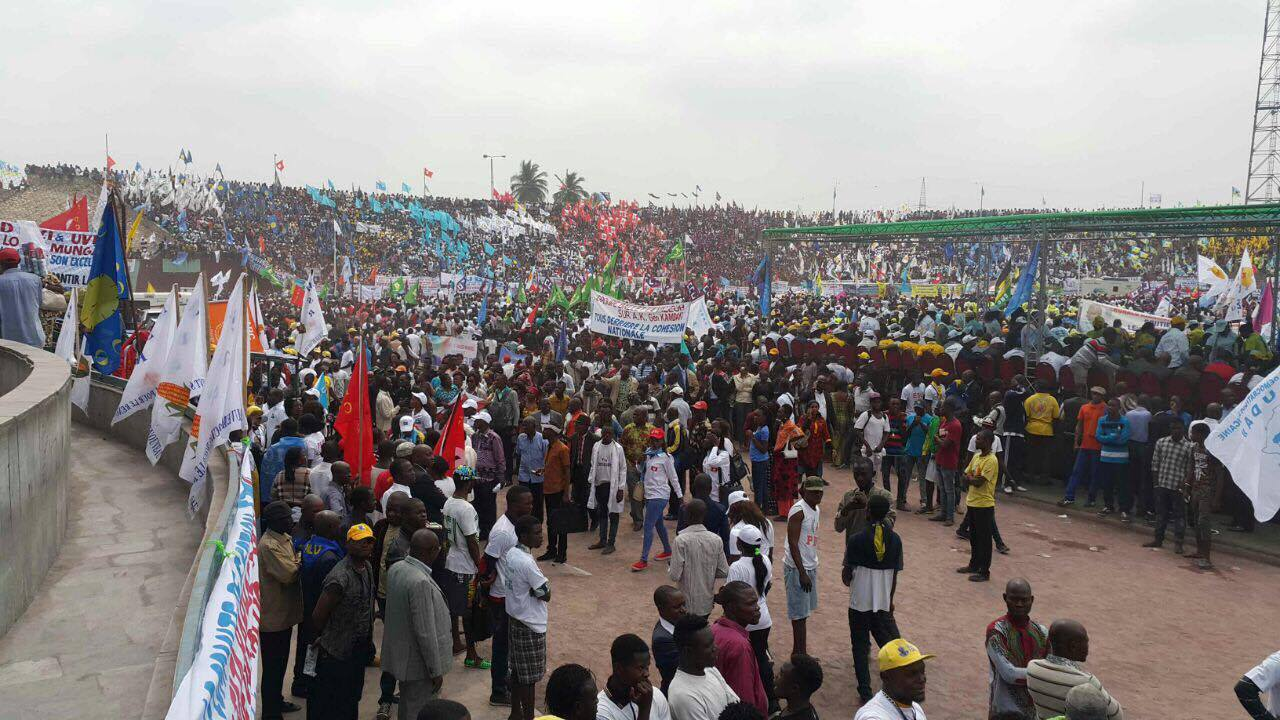
Kabila supporters during a rally at the Stade Tata Raphaël in Kinshasa on 29 July 2016

On 30 July 2016, the voter registration process started, even though no one knew whether elections would actually take place. On 29 September 2016, the CENI announced that the elections would not be held until early 2018. On 1 October, the CENI stated that elections could not be held before the end of 2018.

Also, in September, violent protests broke out against Kabila. In its aftermath, along with the summary proceedings against alleged demonstrators, organisers and financers of the unrest, arrest warrants were signed for at least nine leading politicians, including Félix Tshisekedi.

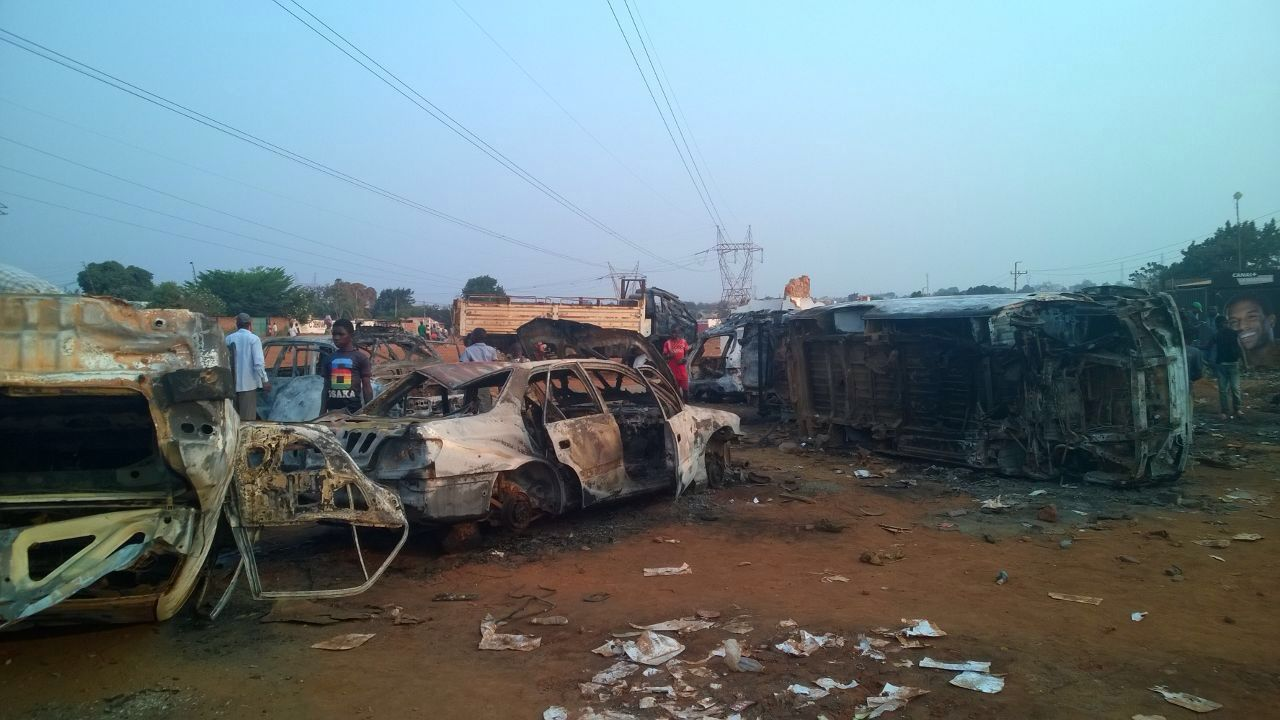
Aftermath of anti-Kabila riots in Kasumbalesa on 9 September 2016

Due to the brutal suppression of the protests, ongoing talks between the government and opposition stalled, and Tshisekedi and Katumbi decided to withdraw completely. The Rassemblement, an opposition platform formed by the two, thereupon became known as the "radical" opposition rather than the "moderate" or "republican" opposition parties that resumed the talks with the government after the protests.

The talks between the government and the moderate opposition parties concluded on 17 October, with the signing of an agreement that set presidential elections for April 2018 at the latest and proposed that Kabila remain president after the expiration of his mandate. A prime minister from the opposition was to lead a transitional government until the elections. The Rassemblement did not sign the agreement, but the mediator allowed for the addition of new parties to the agreement. The CENCO began to facilitate talks between the signatories and non-signatories.

=== Sylvester Agreement and aftermath ===
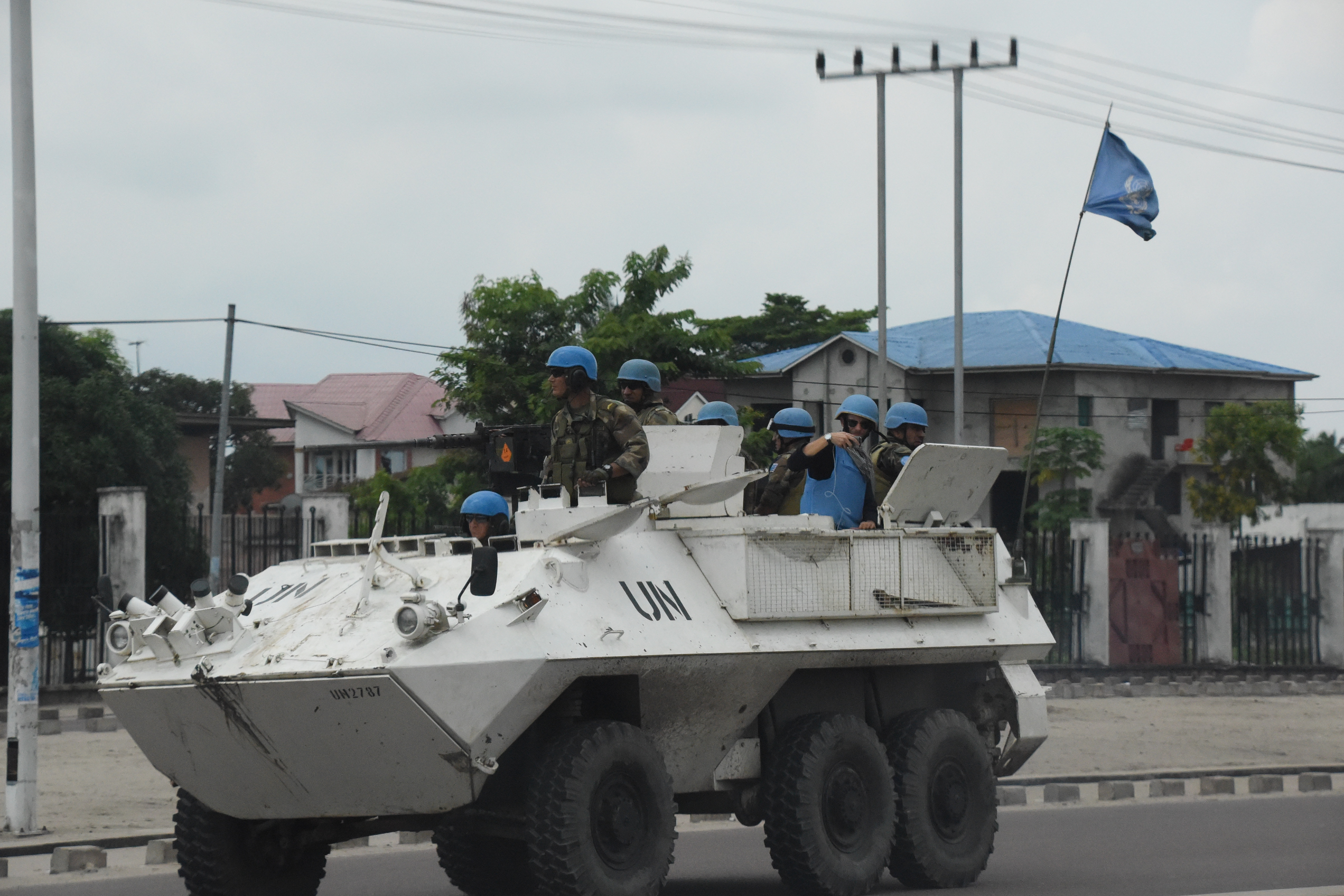
MONUSCO vehicle on the streets of Kinshasa during the unrest in December

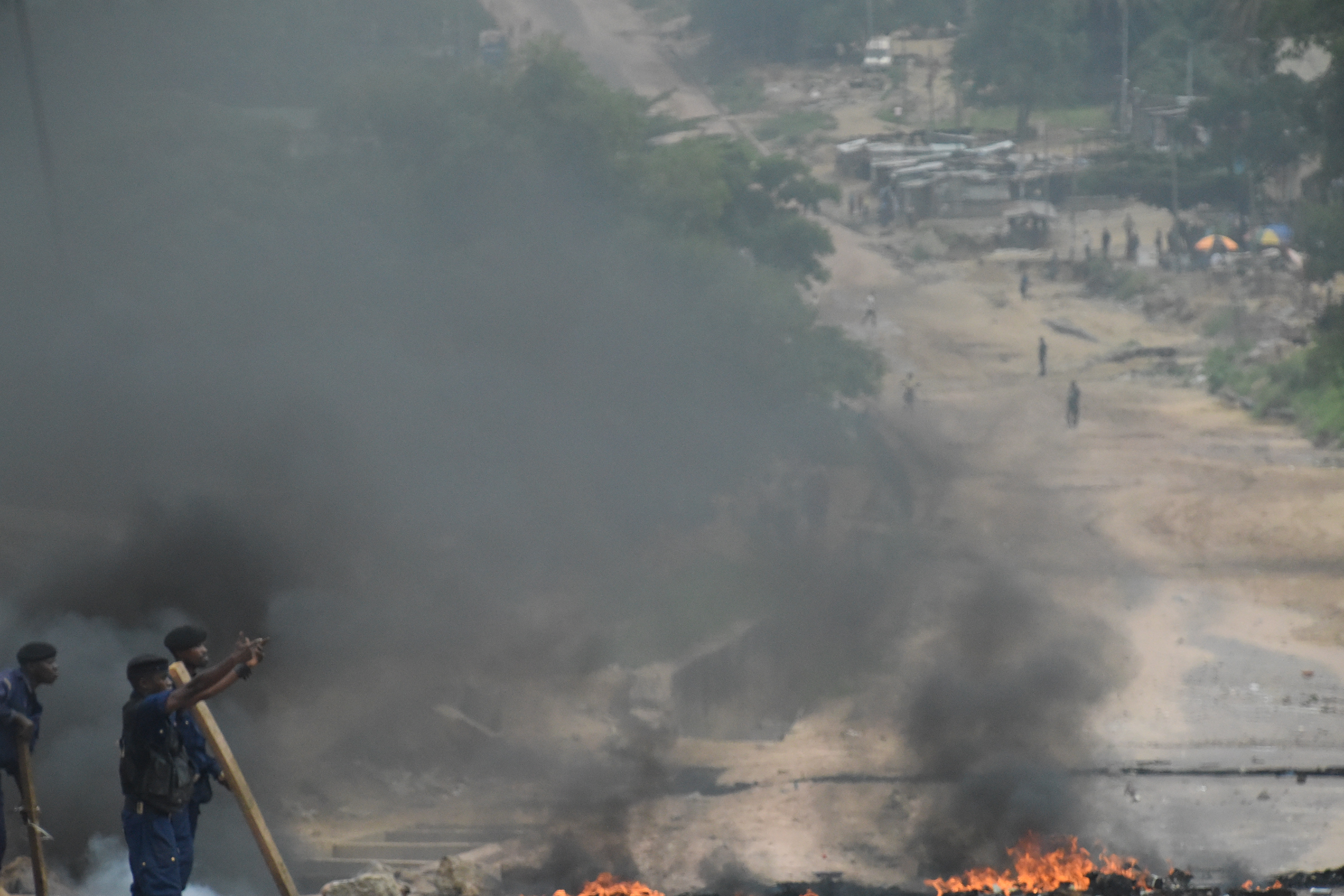
Congolese authorities patrol the streets of Kinshasa near burning material amid unrest in December over actions of President Joseph Kabila to remain in power.

In the lead up to Kabila's term expiration, MONUSCO redeployed some of its troops from the eastern provinces to the capital in the expectation for unrest. When Kabila did not step down at midnight, opposition leaders called for demonstrations, accusing the president of carrying out a coup d'état. In the clashes that followed, at least 20 people were killed and 50 were wounded in Kinshasa and Lubumbashi. Around 220 to 600 were arrested.

On 22 December, the transitional government was finally installed with Samy Badibanga as prime minister, bypassing Vital Kamerhe, the leader of the UNC and an important figure within the moderate opposition. Badibanga had been a close ally of Etienne Tshisekedi before the 2011 elections, but after the results of those elections had been announced and Kabila was proclaimed the winner, Tshisekedi had called on his party members to boycott parliament. Badibanga, however, defied Tshiekedi and took his seat, becoming president of the UDPS parliamentary group.

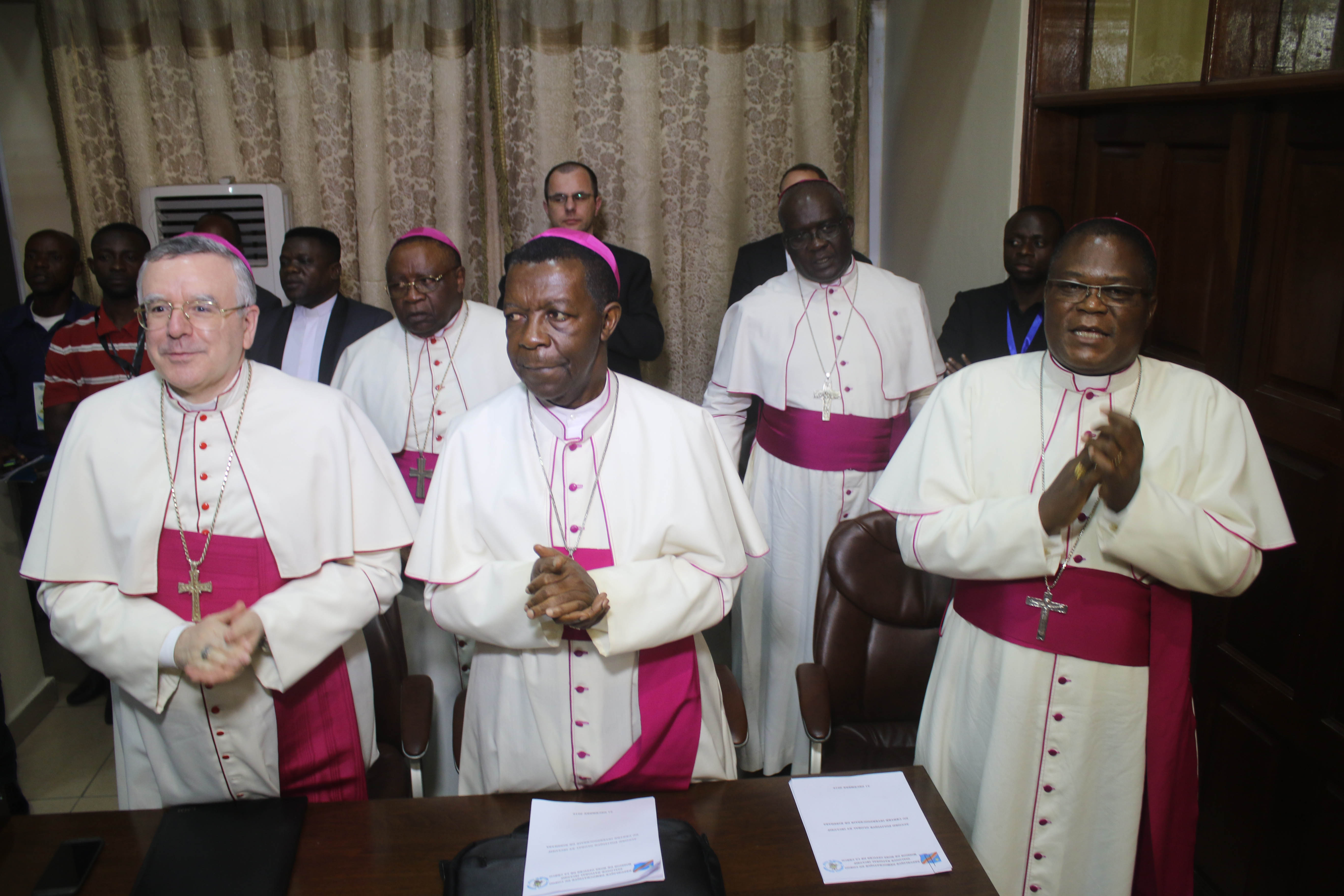
Signing of the Sylvester Agreement between signatories of 18 October Political Agreement and the Rassemblement-led opposition

Under heavy pressure by CENCO, signatories and non-signatories to the 17 October agreement agreed to a new agreement on 31 December, stating that presidential, legislative, and provincial elections should be organized before the end of 2017 and that Kabila would remain in office until then but was not allowed to run for another term. Until the end of March 2017, yet another transitional government was to be formed under the leadership of the opposition and was to be tasked with organising the transition process. The agreement also provided for a National Monitoring Council of the Agreement (CNSA), under the leadership of Etienne Tshisekedi, which would supervise the process and function as a platform for discussions. This agreement, later known as the Sylvester Agreement, after considerable international and domestic pressure, was accepted by Kabila, along with signatures from other opposition figures throughout 2017.

==== 2017 ====
Etienne Tshisekedi's leadership wouldn't last for long as he died on 1 February, taking with him the opposition's capacity to mobilise the masses, leading to the opposition's disintegration. When Felix Tshisekedi was designated to lead the UDPS and Rassemblemen, some of his father's long-term companions contested the monarchist style of the succession, forming dissident groups such as the Rassemblement Kasa-Vubu and several UDPS factions, many of whom were later allowed to become registered parties despite the law banning duplicate parties.

Exploiting these divisions, Kabila was able to co-opt and integrate its members, appointing Rassemblement/UDPS dissident Bruno Tshibala as prime minister even though there was a dispute over the nomination process. This selection technically fulfilled part of the Sylvester Agreement but also increased the fragmentation of the opposition. In response, the mainline Rassemblement called for mass demonstrations on 10 April. The turnout was low and soon turned into a general strike as the authorities banned public demonstrations and heavily deployed security forces. Given the high risks to their safety, opposition followers were discouraged from participating, with Felix Tshisekedi himself immediately leaving for Ethiopia after calling for the popular uprising. On 9 May, Prime Minister Tshibala presented his 59-member transitional government, made up mostly of members from the previous government, with some positions going to Rassemblement dissidents.

The government further delayed the elections by withholding the election budget and conducting half-hearted voter registration. Citing alleged technical and logistical issues, central stakeholders repeatedly made tentative statements in order to test whether an additional extension would be accepted. On 9 May, Nangaa, stated that violence by Kamuina Nsapu fighters, who had allegedly looted six CENI offices and beheaded three election workers, were stalling the registration process in the Kasai region. On 7 July, Nangaa announced in Paris that, due to the delays from the violence in the region, elections could not be organised before the end of the year. Later, on 10 October, Nangaa, once again citing the violence in the region, declared that elections could not take place before April 2019 as voter registration would have to take another three months, along with another 16 months that would be needed to organise the polls. Many saw this as an exaggeration and a political move by the CENI director.

On 22 July, Kabila designated Joseph Olenghankoy, leader of the Rassemblement Kasa-Vubu, as the president CNSA, a position reserved for the leader of the Rasssemblement. Although officially made by parliament, this nomination was in violation of the agreement as it was done without the consensus of the opposition.

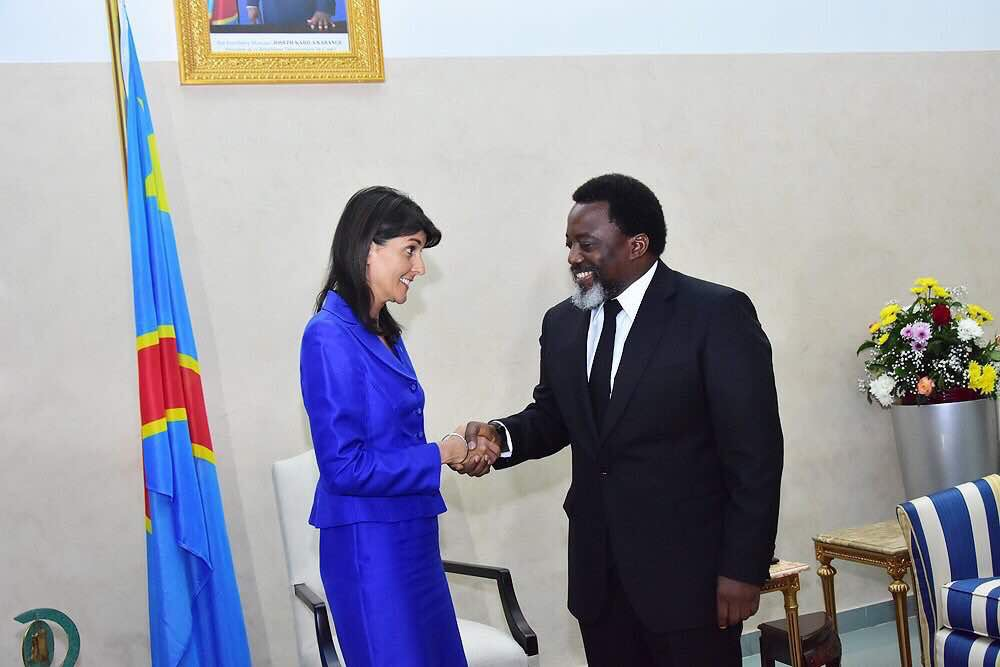
Nikki Haley received by Joseph Kabila in Kinshasa on 27 October

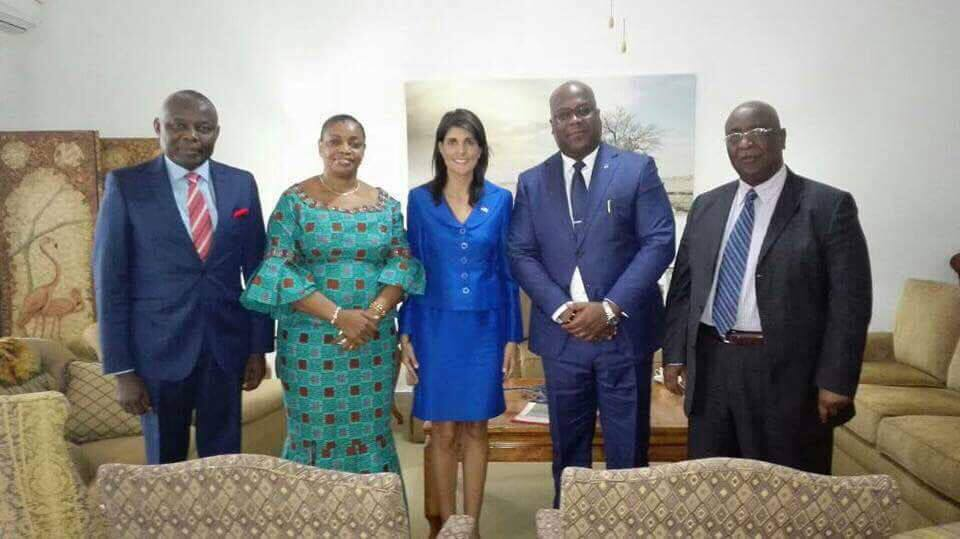
Nikki Haley surrounded by members of the opposition, from left to right: Vital Kamerhe, Eve Bazaiba, Felix Tshisekedi, and Pierre Lumbi in Kinshasa on October 27

On 27 October, Nikki Haley, US ambassador to the UN, visited the DRC, where she met Kabila and opposition members, and demanded that elections take place in 2018. A week later, in what could be seen as a concession to Haley's demands, the CENI published a new calendar, setting the election date for 23 December 2018, something many observers criticised for legitimising the regime's delay tactic. There were also concerns that failure to implete the timetable would lead to the government delaying the elections once again, with opposition parties such as the UDPS, UNC, and Movement for the Liberation of the Congo (MLC) each individually rejecting the calendar, reiterating their demands that President Kabila leave office by the end of the year. On the other hand, while highlighting the importance of its timely implementation, international bodies such as the UNSC and the AU accepted it.

As it became clear that the extension granted by the Sylvester Agreement would expire without elections, a secular coordination committee associated with the CENCO called for nationwide protests on 31 December. Despite severe repression and direct threats, the protests drew tens of thousands of protesters, something not seen since the September 2016 unrest. In response, security forces used tear gas and live ammunition, even inside churches and parishes, resulting in at least eight deaths, 46 injuries, and the arrests of over 140 people, including priests and altar boys. The crackdown on peaceful demonstrators sparked widespread condemnation both domestically and internationally, including Cardinal Laurent Monsengwo Pasinya, the Archbishop of Kinshasa, whose remarks triggered a surge of online ridicule aimed at the government, reigniting political discussions throughout the nation.

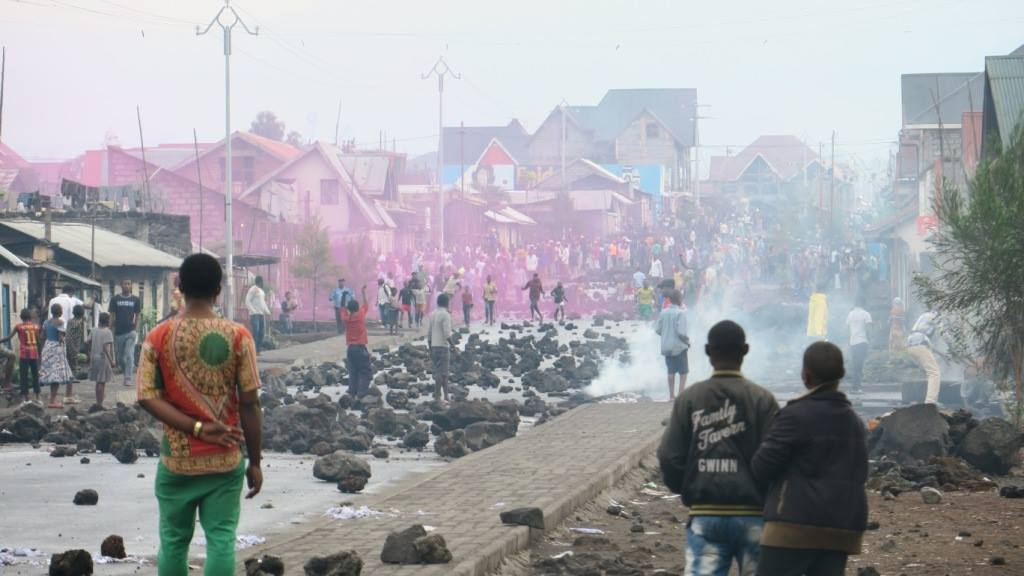
Anti-Kabila protesters clash with police in the streets of Goma on 30 October 2017.

==== 2018 ====
Throughout 2018, it became increasingly clear that glissement was coming to an end as the government was seemly preparing to actually hold elections, though not without concerns that Kabila might attempt to surprise and overrun an unprepared and divided opposition, either with a hastily organised vote or through electoral fraud.

The CENI completed the registration of 46 million voters on 31 January, an increase of 12%, sparking concerns over fictitious voters. An independent audit by the Organisation internationale de la Francophonie (OIF) on 25 May appeared to show this with it reporting that 6.7 million voters had been registered without sufficient identification and that 400,000 voters would be underage at the time of elections, and that 1.2 million blank id cards had disappeared. The OIF recommended a publication of the provisional voter register, which ceni only started in September.

The government pushed for the use of electronic voting machines despite significant financial and logistical obstacles, including the challenge of deploying 106,000 machines across the country, unreliable electricity in many areas, and the difficulties of introducing a new voting method to rural areas with low literacy rates. Many saw this push as an attempt to use the machines to falsify the vote, lowering trust with state institutions and the electoral process.

To facilitate the elections and the subsequent transfer of power, parliament enacted several laws including a measure on 4 May to allocate parliamentary seats based on voter registration data, a 5 June decision barring members of the Congolese diaspora, many of whom were government critics, from participating in the election, and a 17 July provision granting former heads of state benefits such as immunity, lifelong security protection, and a special pension.

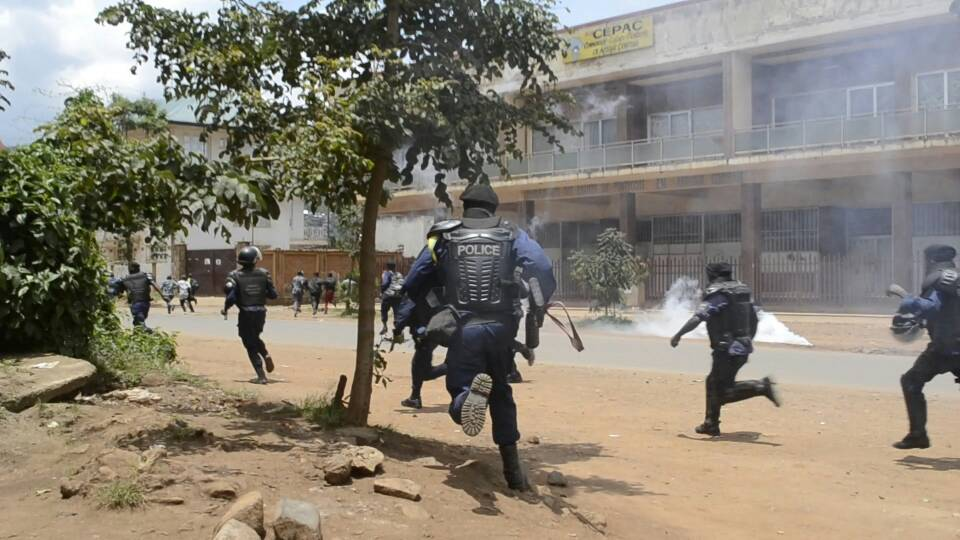
Police disperse anti-Kabila protests in Buvaku with tear gas on 25 February 2018.

According to the UN, a total of 47 people had been killed at protests against President Kabila during this period, which occurred throughout 2017 and into 2018. According to Human Rights Watch, government security forces used live rounds to disperse crowds of opposition supporters throughout August 2018, stating that the total death toll by then since 2015 was 300 people. HRW also documented attempts by the Congolese government to persecute members of the opposition.

In late December, the government further delayed voting in three cities until 31 March 2019. Those include Beni and Butembo in North Kivu province, due to the 2018 Ebola outbreak as well as the ongoing military conflict, and Yumbi in the western Mai-Ndombe province, where about 900 people were killed throughout December by inter-ethnic violence. This was criticized as these regions are known as opposition strongholds.

== Electoral system ==
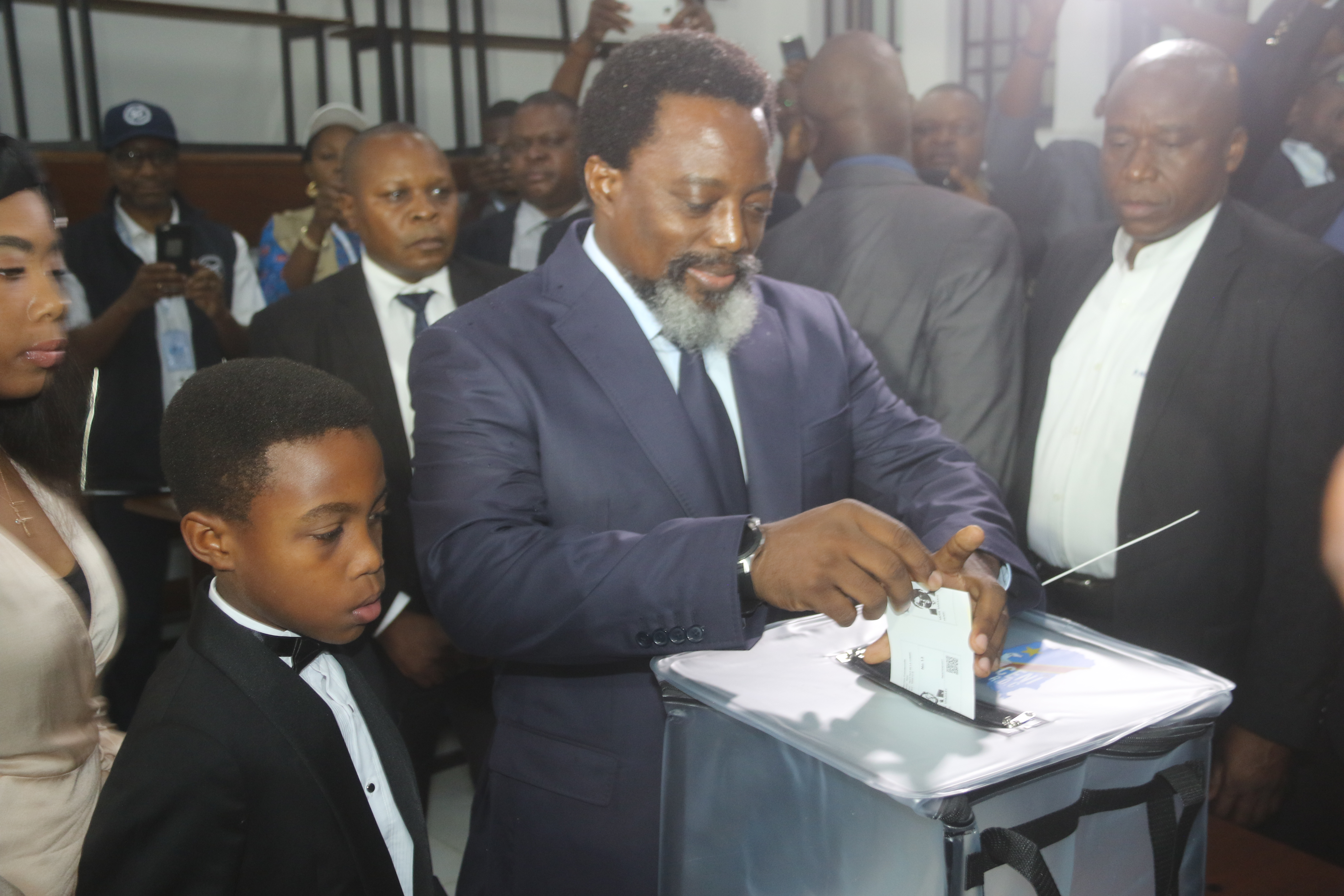
President Joseph Kabila casting his vote on 30 December 2018

According to Article 71 of the DRC Constitution, the President of the Democratic Republic of the Congo is elected by plurality vote in one round. Article 72 specifies that the requirements to stand as a candidate for the presidency include being a Congolese citizen and at least thirty years old.

Article 101 of the Constitution provides the basis for electing a National Assembly. The 500 members of the National Assembly are elected by two methods; in 2018, 62 were elected from single-member constituencies using first-past-the-post voting, and 438 were elected from multi-member constituencies by open list proportional representation, with seats allocated using the largest remainder method.

For the first time, electronic voting machines were used in a Congolese election. This has raised concerns about vote-rigging, particularly after a warehouse fire in Kinshasa destroyed 8,000 voting machines, which represent more than two-thirds of the voting machines that had been planned to be used in the city.

== Candidates ==
=== Kabila's successor ===
On 1 July 2018, members of the AMP and moderate opposition groups launched a new coalition called the Common Front for Congo (FFC), with Kabila at its head, to support a "sole candidate for the presidential elections running on the basis of a common programme". It was unclear whether Kabila himself would be the candidate, as he asked each party within the coalition to propose four candidates while retaining the authority to select the final nominee.

A day before the deadline for candidate registration, on 7 August, the FFC held a 24-hour meeting at Kabila's farm in Kingakati to select a successor. The meeting ended up with a controversial, yet "underwhelming" pick of close Kabila ally Emmanuel Ramazani Shadary, a man who was under EU sanctions, which was seen as a defiance to the international community. Shardy had previously been interior minister and was president of the PPRD, yet he was barely known by the public and lacked political capital. To most observers, his leadership would probably have been another Medvedev–Putin tandemocracy, where Kabila was the one actually calling the shots.

=== Search for a unified candidate ===
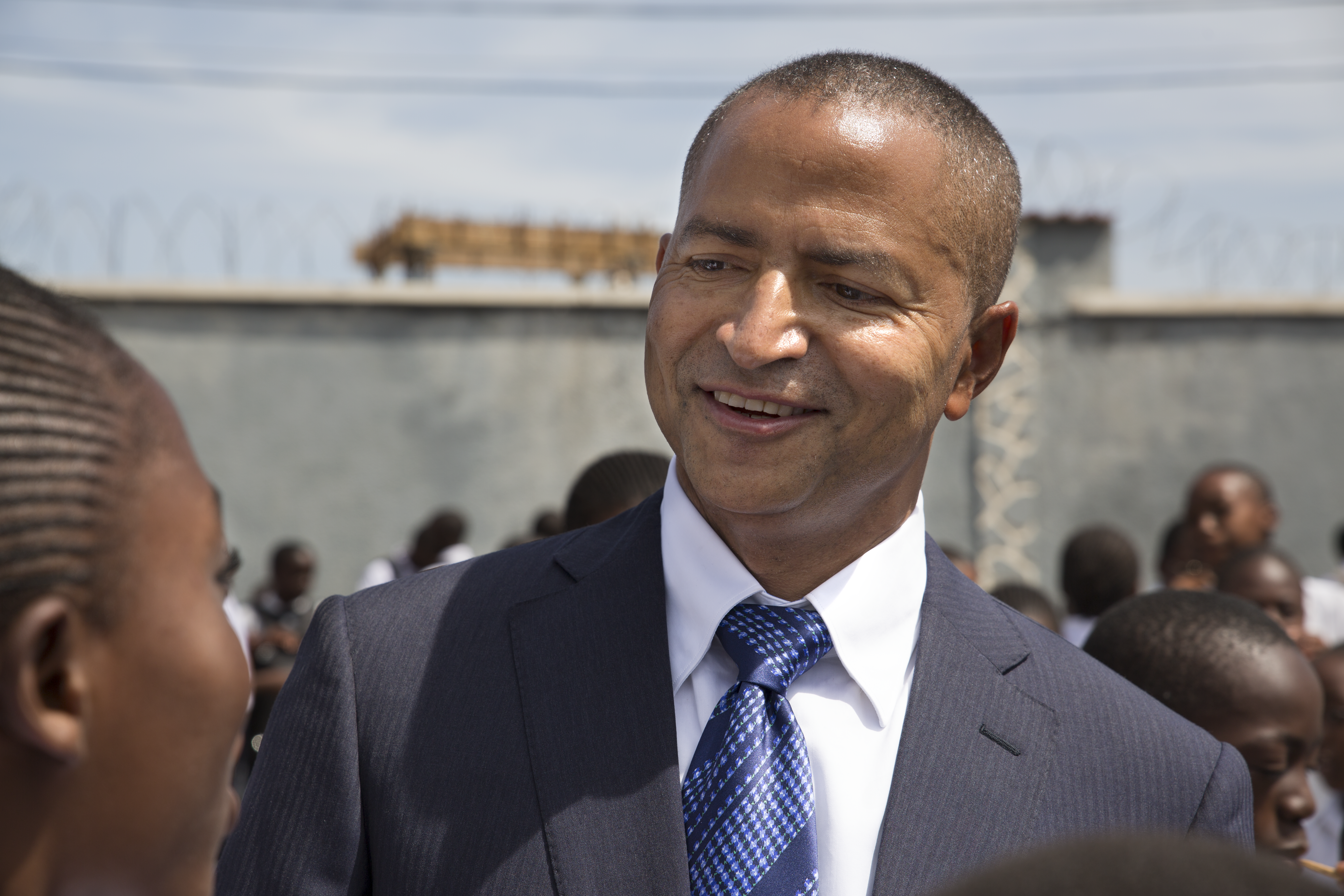
Katumbi in 2016

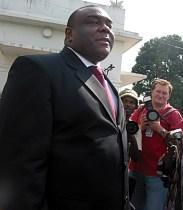
Bemba in 2006

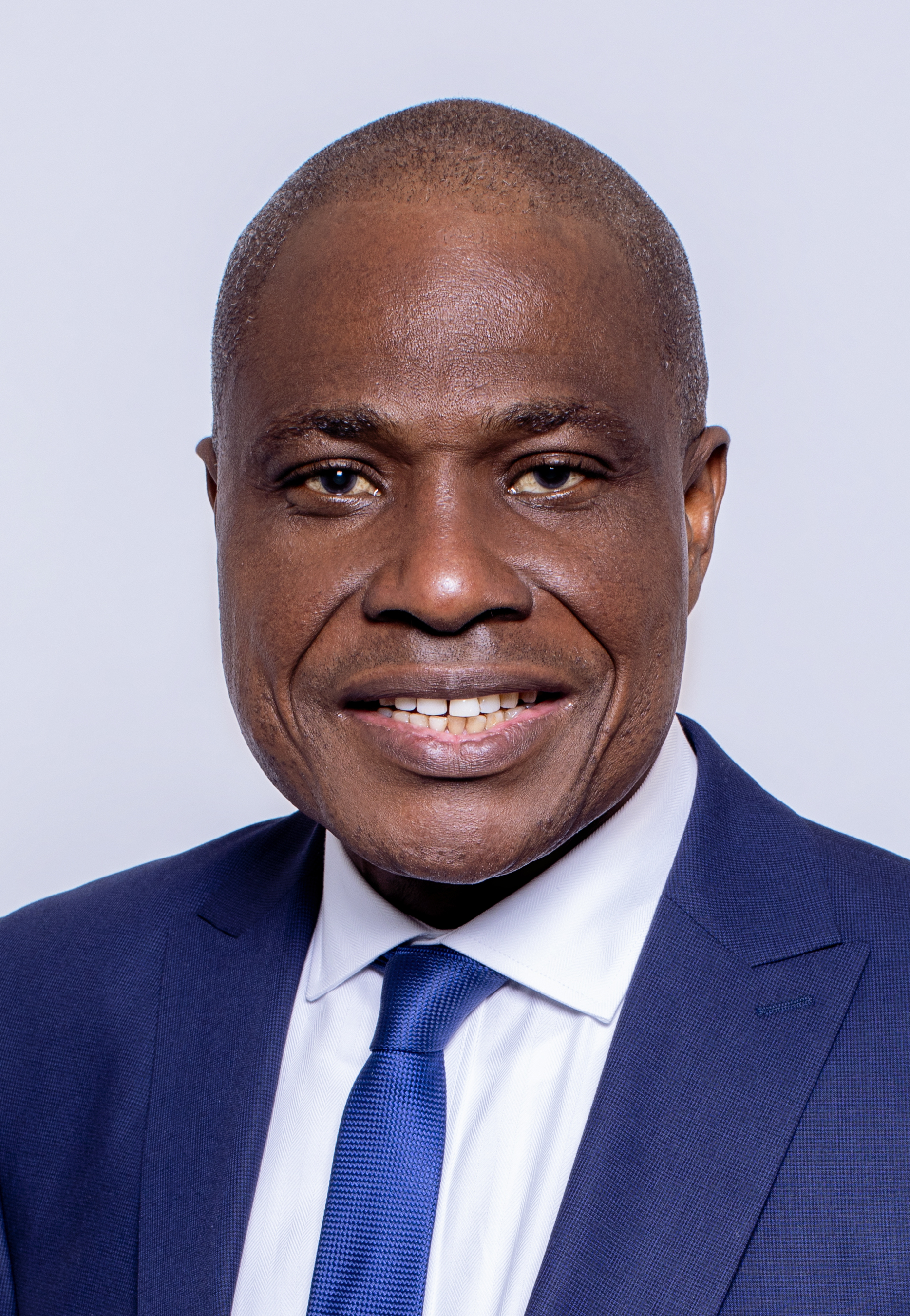
Fayulu in 2018

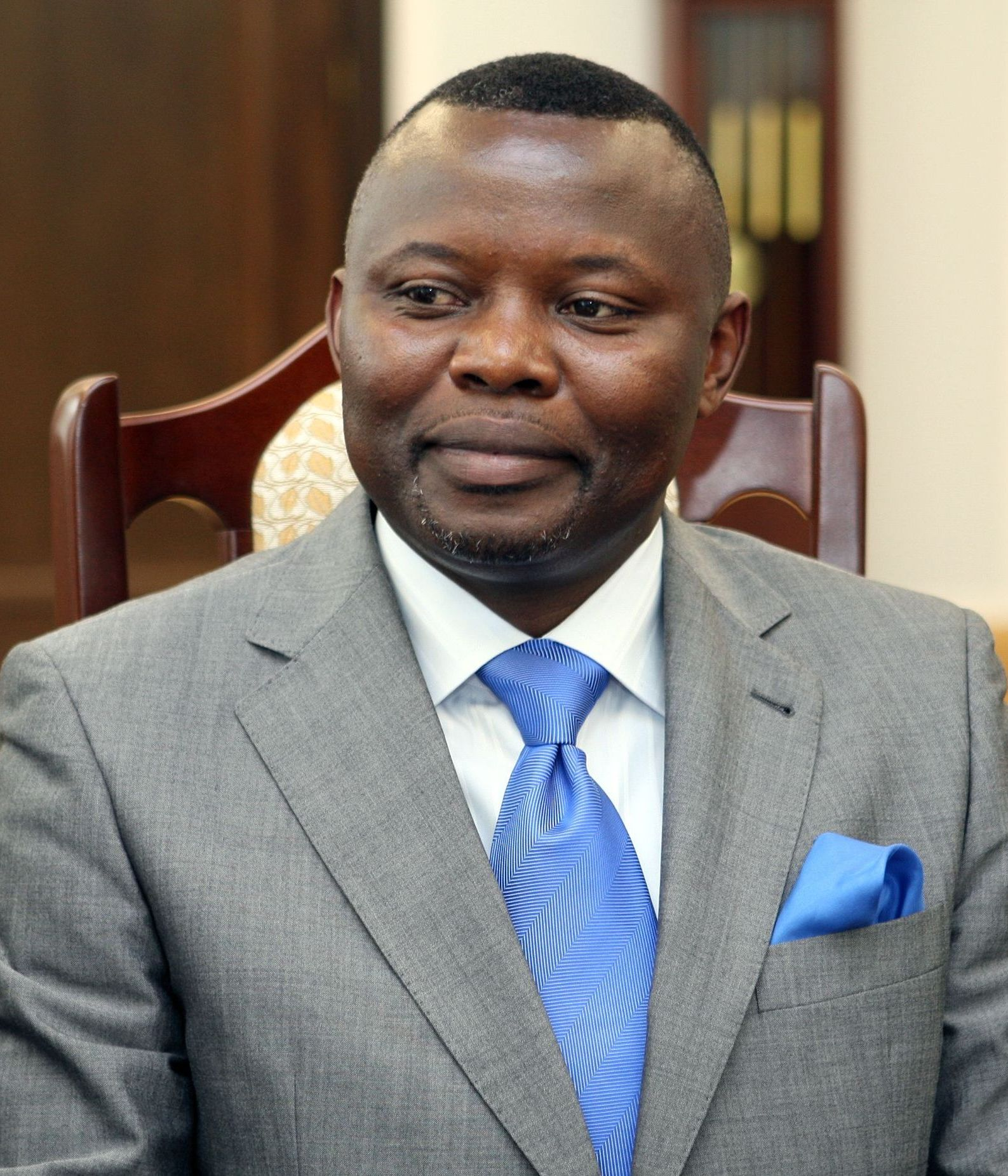
Kamerhe in 2007

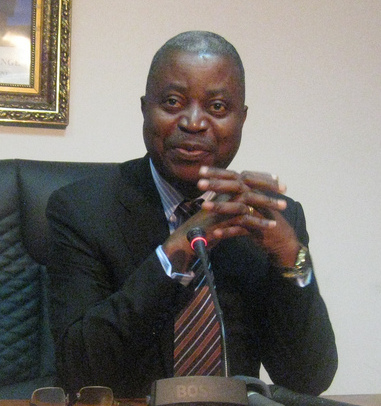
Muzito in 2009

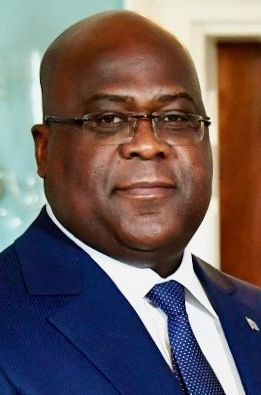
Tshisekedi in 2019

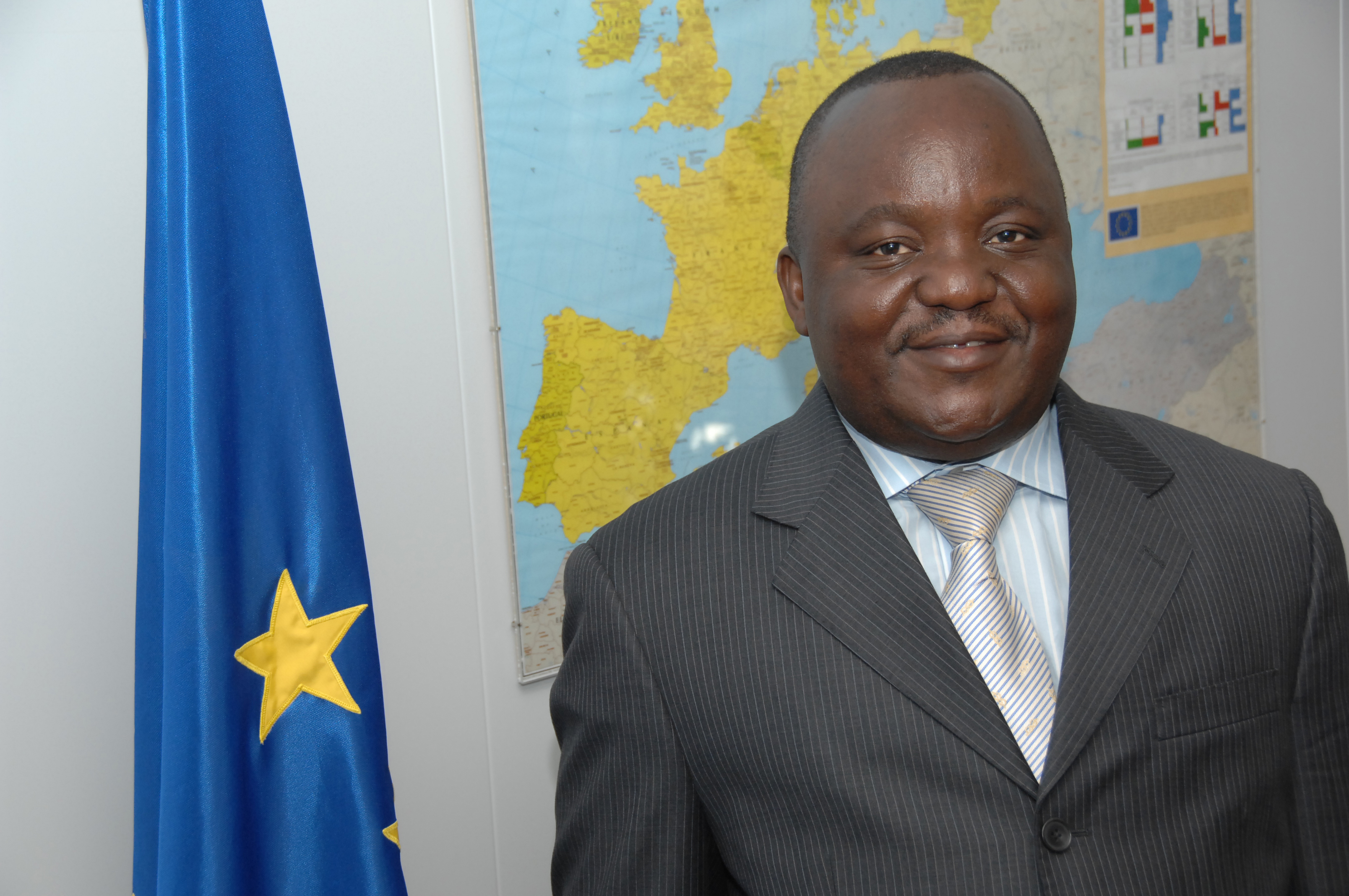
Mbusa in 2007

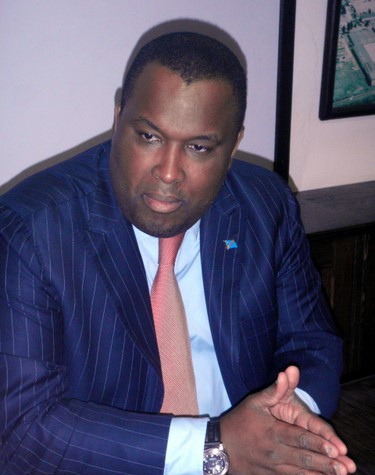
Nzanga Mobutu, son of Mobutu Sese Seko, in 2010

In the lead up to the election, it became clear to major opposition figures that the only way to defeat Kabila was to unite behind a single candidate. The idea for a need for a unified candidate was already floating around in 2016, with Katumbi and others advocating for an opposition primary. Several initiatives were launched in 2018, and opposition meetings were held in Kinshasa, Brussels, Johannesburg, and Pretoria. These would prove fruitless, however, due to each party's traditional regionalism and the unwillingness of the opposition figures to set aside their personal ambitions for a greater cause.

Rassemblement, having already suffered from splits, proved unable to survive even with a Felix Tshisekedi and Pierre Lumbi's co-chairmanship, with other opposition leaders leaving to form their own coalitions. One of these leaders, Katumbi, with several opposition parties, including those in the Alternation for the Republic and G7 coalitions, formed Together for Change on 11 March 2018, designating Katumbi as their presidential candidate. The next day, Katumbi once again attempted to return to the country, this time to run. Members of the AMP attempted to stop this by stating that since he had dual citizenship, he couldn't run for office under the constitution, but since this would've affected other dual citizen AMP members, the government dropped this point and simply barred him from entering the country. When opposition leaders jointly requested that Katumbi be allowed to return and run, the government issued an international arrest warrant against him.

On 31 March, having consolidated his position in the UDPS, Felix Tshikendi was able to gain the nomination as party leader and presidential candidate within his faction of the UDPS, which was allowed to keep its original name by the CNSA.

On 13 July 2006, presidential runnerup and MLC leader Jean-Pierre Bemba, having been acquitted at the ICC of his war crime charge due to lack of evidence, while being ironically convicted for tampering at The Hague, was nominated by his party for president. A month later, the CENI disqualified him for the witness tampering as it counted as corruption. With the disqualification of two major opposition leaders, it raised hopes that a unified candidate could emerge

On 11 November 2018, after a multi-day conference in Geneva supported by Kofi Annan Foundation, the seven opposition leaders—Bemba, Martin Fayulu of the Dynamic of the Opposition (DO), Kamerhe, Katumbi, Freddy Matungulu of Our Congo (CNB), former Prime Minister Adolphe Muzito, and Félix Tshisekedi—signed an agreement to form a political coalition named "Lamuka" to support their nominee Fayulu, a dark horse pick. The coalition also called on the CENI to take specific measures ahead of the election, including scrapping the use of electronic voting machines, cleaning up the electoral rolls, and easing political tensions to ensure free, transparent, inclusive, and peaceful elections.

In response, rank and file supporters of the UDPS began violent protests in Limete, the party's headquarters, with some even threatening to burn down the hq building. Similar protests by UNC supporters broke out in the Stade des Martyrs. Succumbing to the pressure, both leaders withdrew their signatures in less than 24 hours, with Tshikendi claiming he had been tricked into voting for Fayulu and that his base wanted him to run for president instead. Later, on 23 November, in Nairobi, the leaders agreed to create the Heading for Change coalition and support Tshikendi as its presidential candidate.

Lamuka was later joined by Antipas Mbusa and his Forces for Renewal (RCD/K-ML) on 19 November, Jean-Philibert Mabaya and his Rainbow of Congo (ACC) on 3 December, and Nzanga Mobutu and his Zaire group, which included the Union of Mobutist Democrats, on 8 December.

=== Others ===
In total, 21 candidates were approved for the presidential contest, and some 34,900 candidates were approved to run for the 500 national and 715 provincial assembly seats. The final list was published on 19 September.

=== Disqualified candidates ===
On 3 September, the Constitutional Court of the DRC upheld the national election commission's decision to ban six potential candidates from taking part in the election, including opposition leader Jean-Pierre Bemba.

- Samy Badibanga, former prime minister
- Jean-Pierre Bemba
- Antoine Gizenga, 93-year-old former associate of Patrice Lumumba and former prime minister of the DRC under Kabila
- Moïse Katumbi
- Adolphe Muzito
- Bruno Tshibala

== Opinion polls ==
Opinion polling is rare in the Democratic Republic of the Congo due to poor roads and lack of electricity. Nevertheless, the Congo Research Group (CRG) released a poll in October 2016 of 7,545 respondents in the country's 26 provinces. The poll found that 33% would vote for Katumbi, 18% for Etienne Tshisekedi, and 7.8% for Kabila.

A May 2017 poll of 7,500 respondents carried out by CRG/BERCI found that 38% would vote for Katumbi, 10% for Kabila, 5% each for Félix Tshisekedi, Vital Kamerhe and Jean-Pierre Bemba, 24% for other candidates, and 13% would not vote.

A March 2018 poll carried out by the CRG showed Katumbi obtaining 26%, Tshisekedi with 14%, Adolphe Muzito and Kamerhe tied at 9%, Kabila with 7%, and Augustin Mataya Ponyo and Aubin Minaku with 3% each.

A June 2018 Top Congo FM poll amongst opposition supporters showed Katumbi winning 54% of the opposition's vote, with Kamerhe at 34%, Bemba at 7%, and Tshisekedi at 5%.

In October 2018, the Congo Research Group released a poll that showed Tshisekedi winning 36% of the overall vote, with Kamerhe winning 17%, Shadary winning 16%, and Fayulu winning 8%, with 5% undecided or not voting. The remaining votes went to minor candidates.

== Post-voting process ==
On the afternoon of 31 December 2018, the NetBlocks internet observatory reported regional internet disruptions in Kinshasa and Lubumbashi and the subsequent loss of connectivity across the DRC. The signal of Radio France Internationale, the country's most popular news source, was also blocked with a spokesman stating that the restrictions were implemented by Congolese authorities to prevent the spread of "fictitious results" published on social media and maintain order. The following day, representatives of the U.S., European Union, Swiss and Canadian missions in Kinshasa urged the DRC to restore Internet access.

On 2 January 2019, the Southern African Development Community (SADC) and African Union (AU) observation missions stated that the voting went "relatively well" and was peaceful, despite the logistical problems in the DRC.

The Catholic Church in the DRC, which deployed 40,000 election observers, announced on 3 January that by their observations it was clear who the winner of the election was. A government spokesman condemned the Church's statement as "irresponsible and anarchic." Western diplomatic sources speaking with Church officials reported that they identified Martin Fayulu as the winner with 60% of the votes., However, Rev. Donatien Nshole, the church's secretary general, later retracted the church's allegations following a meeting with Kabila on 8 January, claiming that "we said there was a winner but we did not mention any name nor give any figures." Nshole also said that the church now would trust Kabila to lead any transition of power, claiming "he insisted on the fact that he wants to maintain peace and unity...we want the same."

On 4 January, United States President Donald Trump deployed 80 U.S. troops to the nearby country of Gabon to stand by in case violence broke in the DRC over the election results. On 9 January, the U.S. embassy in Kinshasa warned American citizens to leave the country due to possible election-related violence.

On 5 January, election commission chairman Cornielle Nangaa announced that preliminary results would not be announced on the scheduled date of 6 January, as the commission had only received less than half of the ballots. The following day this was confirmed and no date was given for the publication of the preliminary results, which was criticized by members of the opposition. On 8 January, Kabila adviser Kikaya Bin Karubi denied an allegation made by two aides of Felix Tshisekedi which claimed that Tshisekedi was the presumed winner and that Kabila officials had been meeting with aides of Tshisekedi since the end of the election so Kabila would hand power to Tshisekedi.

Police in anti-riot gear were deployed in front of the electoral commission headquarters in Kinshasa on 9 January. That same day, South African President Cyril Ramaphosa and other members of SADC urged the Congolese government to finalize the results quickly.

=== Announcement of results ===
In the early morning of the following day, 10 January 2019, after reading the results of over 700 candidacies for provincial elections from across the country, the commission announced Felix Tshisekedi as the winner of the presidential vote. Barnabé Kikaya bin Karubi, an advisor to Joseph Kabila, said that the president accepted the loss of the ruling party candidate Emmanuel Shadary. Tshisekedi vowed to become "the president of all DR Congolese." On 12 January, it became known that the majority of seats in the National Assembly were won by parties supporting Kabila. The Céni announced the names of the winning candidates, as well as the total of votes on the national level, but no further info. The announcement, initially scheduled for past the presidential election's appeal and oath, took place while the votes were still being compiled all over the country.

== Results ==
=== President ===
Candidate	Party	Votes	%
Félix Tshisekedi	Union for Democracy and Social Progress	7,051,013	38.56
Martin Fayulu	Dynamic of Congolese Political Opposition	6,366,732	34.82
Emmanuel Ramazani Shadary	Common Front for Congo	4,357,359	23.83
Radjabho Tebabho Soborabo	Congolese United for Reform	70,249	0.38
Vital Kamerhe	Union for the Congolese Nation	51,380	0.28
Pierre Honoré Kazadi Lukonda Ngube-Ngube	People's Front for Justice	44,019	0.24
Théodore Ngoy	Independent	43,697	0.24
Freddy Matungulu	Our Congo	33,273	0.18
Marie-Josée Ifoku	Alliance of Elites for a New Congo	27,313	0.15
Jean-Philibert Mabaya	Rainbow of Congo	26,907	0.15
Samy Badibanga	The Progressives	26,722	0.15
Alain Daniel Shekomba	Independent	26,611	0.15
Seth Kikuni	Independent	23,552	0.13
Noël Kabamba Tshiani Muadiamvita	Independent	23,548	0.13
Charles Luntadila	Independent	20,182	0.11
Yves Mpunga	Premier Political Force	18,976	0.10
Tryphon Kin-Kiey Mulumba	Independent	16,596	0.09
Gabriel Mokia Mandembo	Movement of Congolese Democrats	15,778	0.09
Francis Mvemba	Independent	15,013	0.08
Sylvain Maurice Masheke	Independent	14,337	0.08
Joseph Maluta	Independent	11,562	0.06
Total		18,284,819	100.00
Valid votes		18,280,820	99.74
Invalid/blank votes		48,498	0.26
Total votes		18,329,318	100.00
Registered voters/turnout		38,542,138	47.56
Source: African Union (Note: There is a difference of 3,999 between the reported number of valid votes (18,280,820) and the reported totals for each candidate.)

=== National Assembly ===
Party	Seats
People's Party for Reconstruction and Democracy	50
Alliance of the Democratic Forces of Congo	41
Union for Democracy and Social Progress	32
Alternative Action for Wellbeing and Change	30
People's Party for Peace and Democracy	25
Social Movement	24
Alliance of Actors for Good Governance of Congo	23
Alliance for the Future	22
Movement for the Liberation of the Congo	22
Alliance of Democrats for Renewal and Progress	22
Alliance of Movements of Kongo	22
Unified Lumumbist Party	17
Union for the Congolese Nation	16
Future of the Congo	12
Alliance of Construction for an Emergent Congo	11
Rally for the Reconstruction of Congo	11
Group of 7	11
Action of Allies to Improve Living Conditions for the Congolese	10
Christian Democratic Party	10
Alliance for the Overall Transformation of Congo	10
Alliance for Democratic Alternative	10
Alternative for the Republic	9
Alliance	8
Stand Up Congo	8
Progressists' Convention for the Republic	8
Dynamic of Congolese Political Opposition	8
Movement for the Integrity of the People	7
Alliance in the Unity	6
Rainbow of Congo	5
Group 18	4
Alliance of Progressives for Congo	3
Avançons	1
Party for the People's Revolution	1
United for the Republic	1
Total	500
Source: IPU

== Aftermath ==
=== Accusations of fraud ===
Election leaks mapped by territory and city

Leak from the CENI given to journalists by a whistleblower, representing 86% of the total votes cast

Leak from the CENCO, representing 43% of the total votes cast

Second-place candidate Martin Fayulu claimed that the results were rigged later that day, stating "In 2006, Jean-Pierre Bemba's victory was stolen, in 2011, Étienne Tshisekedi's victory was stolen. In 2018 victory won't be stolen from Martin Fayulu." Furthermore, he claimed that Tshisekedi and Kabila had entered into a power-sharing deal, which was denied by Tshisekedi.

Most independent observers, including the Catholic Church, backed Fayulu, believing he had actually won in a landside. They believe that Kabila, realising his chosen successor couldn't credibly win, struck a power-sharing deal with Tshisekedi to rig the elections for the latter in exchange for allowing Kabila to control parliament and all the provincial governments. According to Jason Stearns, several regional and international powers, including Kenya and the United States, gave the secret agreement their tacit blessing, with then-United States Ambassador to the Democratic Republic of the Congo later telling him "This was the best deal we could get. It was either this or Kabila stays in power."

On 11 January, Fayulu claimed he received 62% of the vote and said he would challenge the result in the country's Constitutional Court. The Court could confirm Tshisekedi, order a recount, or cancel the results and call for new elections. But Fayulu admitted that he did not believe he would have any success, saying the court is "composed of Kabila's people." He also claimed that "Felix Tshisekedi has been nominated by Mr Kabila to perpetuate the Kabila regime. Because today the boss is Kabila." Tshisekedi's spokesman denied that there was any deal between them. Fayulu officially filed a challenge to the results on 12 January.

A joint investigation by the Financial Times and Radio France Internationale appeared to reveal that massive fraud occurred during the election. FT claimed on 15 January that its analysis of two separate collections of voting data — one from an anonymous person close to Fayulu who said they had obtained it with the help of a whistleblower, representing about 86% of votes cast, and another from the Episcopal Conference (CENCO), which represents all Congolese bishops and fielded 39,824 observers on election day — showed Fayulu as the clear winner of the election.

According to the Congo Research Group (CRG), the CENI leak was provided to several journalists by members of the opposition close to Fayulu, who all claimed they obtained it with the help of a whistleblower. At least one journalist claimed to have managed to contact the alleged source of the leak and the whistleblower's account was deemed credible. The CENCO leak was given to journalists from different sources within the organization. The CENI leak indicated that Fayulu received 59.42% of the vote, followed by Felix Tshisekedi with 18.97% and Emmanuel Ramazani Shadary with 18.54%. CENCO's tallies were 62.80%, 15.00%, and 17.99%, respectively.

The two leaks were almost identical at both the national and provincial levels, with a correlation of 0.976 to 0.991 for each of the three leading candidates (1 would represent a perfect match). Nationally, despite the Catholic Church tallying less than half of the total votes, the differences between the respective candidates were less than 4%. In 22 provinces, the differences were less than 2%, although there were larger differences in four provinces: Tanganyika (+/-18%), South Kivu (+/-9%), Tshuapa (+/-5%), and Maniema (+/-4%).

The CENI data was provided in a comma-separated values (CSV) format and consisted of a total of 49,000 rows, including the number of each polling site, the names of the schools and institutions where voting took place, and the vote tallies for the presidential candidates. A data analyst from one of the media companies concluded that fabricating the entire dataset would have been extremely difficult without detection when using Benford's Law. Furthermore, the rapid fabrication of such data would have been challenging, as the names and numbers of the approximately 17,000 polling sites were only finalized on 12 December. The CENCO data, however, did not provide information down to the polling site level.

It is reasonable for the CENI to possess this kind of data as Article 69 of the CENI's measures for applying the electoral law requires results to be transmitted to the central CENI office by local technicians. This leak appears to have occurred several days before the CENI announced its official results, representing 86%, or approximately 15.7 million, of the 18.3 million votes cast. The remaining results may not have been immediately transmitted due to technical issues and had to be sent through other means. There is also the possibility that the CENCO and the opposition simply collaborated to create similar fake leaks.

Whatever the case, only a comprehensive audit could've confirmed whether there was indeed massive fraud but as of 16 January 2019, the CENI has not published any disaggregated data beyond the national number of votes.

=== Protests ===
Four people—two police officers and two civilians—were killed in the western city of Kikwit during protests. The following day, 11 January, at least one protester was killed in Goma. There were also reports of protests in Kisangani and Mbandaka. More civilian and police casualties were reported as protests increased across the country, and thousands of military and Republican Guard troops were deployed to maintain order.

On 18 January, the UN human rights office has said that 34 people have been killed, 59 wounded, and 241 arbitrarily arrested since the announcement of the provisional results on 10 January.

=== International reactions ===
The governments of France and Belgium also issued statements questioning the official result. French Foreign Minister Jean-Yves Le Drian claimed that Fayulu was expected to be declared the winner. Belgian Foreign Minister Didier Reynders also doubted the result, saying that Belgium would use its temporary UN Security Council seat to investigate the situation. British Foreign Secretary Jeremy Hunt said he was "very concerned about discrepancies" in the results. In an official statement, Secretary-General of the United Nations António Guterres urged all parties to "refrain from violence" and "live up to their responsibility in preserving stability." African Union leader Moussa Faki said that any disputes should be "resolved peacefully, by turning to the relevant laws". The Southern African Development Community (SADC) called for the creation of a national unity government in DR Congo, a negotiated settlement by factions representing Kabila, Tshisekedi, and Fayulu, on 13 January. The organisation also called for a vote recount.

The United Nations Security Council issued a statement drafted by the French delegation urging all sides to respect the outcome of the vote on 15 January.

Representatives of Russia and China stated that they oppose foreign interference in the DRC election.

A number of African Union heads of state and government met in the Ethiopian capital Addis Ababa on 17 January, issuing a statement that the organization had "serious doubts" about the provisional results and calling on the Congolese government to delay the release of the final results. The AU also stated that it would send a delegation to the DRC with "the view to reaching a consensus on a way out of the post-electoral crisis." The delegation would include AU commission head Moussa Faki and AU chairman, the President of Rwanda, Paul Kagame.

The Congolese government rejected the AU's appeal to delay that announcement of the final results on 18 January, and that the announcement will be made after the Constitutional Court makes a decision. Government spokesman Lambert Mende stated that "I do not think anyone has the right to tell the court what to do. I am not under the impression (the AU) fully understands Congo's judicial process."

After the Constitutional Court ruling upholding Tshisekedi's victory on 20 January, Kenyan President Uhuru Kenyatta and South Africa President Cyril Ramaphosa both sent their congratulations to Tshisekedi and recognized him as the next president. AU spokeswoman Ebba Kalondo also issued a statement revealing that the AU agreed to postpone the DRC delegation talks. Kalondo claimed "I can confirm to you that the trip has been postponed. Not canceled." Other African leaders, including Zimbabwe President Emmerson Mnangagwa and the leaders of Tanzania and Burundi, congratulated Tshisekdi for his victory and also recognized him as the next president as well. By 22 January, the AU and EU had agreed to support Tshisekedi's presidency as well. On 23 January, the United States agreed to support the court's certification of Tshisekdi's victory and also work with the incoming DRC President's government as well.

=== Constitutional Court appeal ===
Fayulu officially filed a court case on 12 January. The Constitutional Court announced on Monday, 14 January, that it would review Fayulu's and another candidate, Theodore Ngoy's, appeal the following day. Proceedings began on 15 January and armed riot police were deployed outside the Palace of Justice in Kinshasa. Lawyers representing Fayulu have said that the poll was rigged and have urged the Constitutional Court to order a recount. A decision is due to be made by the Court on 18 January or 19 January. The Court confirmed early on 19 January to Agence France-Presse that the ruling would be made later that day. The Court ruling rejected appeals for a recount, with the verdict declaring Tshisekedi "President of the Democratic Republic of Congo by simple majority." Government spokesman Lambert Mende stated afterwards "Felix Tshisekedi will become the fifth president of the republic."

After the ruling Fayulu claimed to be the "only legitimate president" and has called for mass protests. In a statement he said "The constitutional court has just confirmed that it serves a dictatorial regime ... by validating false results, (and enabling) a constitutional coup d'etat." Fayulu also called on the international community to not recognize this result. Hundreds of Tshisekedi supporters gathered outside of the court building.

== Post-court ruling ==
Following the ruling, on 20 January the government restored Internet access in the country, ending a 20-day shutdown of the Internet that began on 31 December 2018.

On 21 January, the day after the Constitutional Court rejected Fayulu's appeal, it became known that Tshisekedi's scheduled inauguration date (22 January) may be delayed by two days until 24 January. It was announced later that the inauguration was postponed, though no official reason was given. Police dispersed a crowd of Fayulu supporters who had gathered to hear him speak in front of his coalition's headquarters. Nevertheless, the inauguration of Tshisekedi occurred on the rescheduled date of 24 January 2019. In a speech Tshisekedi at the Palais de la Nation in Kinshasa called for a "reconciled country," and stated that "We want to build a strong Congo, turned towards its development, in peace and security – a Congo for all in which everyone has a place." On 28 January the newly elected parliament began its first session.

The overdue election for the Senate of the DRC occurred on 14 March 2019. Parties aligned with former president Kabila's Common Front for Congo (FCC) won a majority of Senate seats, giving them control of both the upper and lower house of the legislature and potentially making President Tshisekedi's attempts to reform the government more limited. The President's UPDS party won very few seats. That same month elections took place for 23 provincial governors, most of them also won by FCC candidates.

Several months into the Tshisekedi administration, by the start of May 2019 the President had not yet appointed a prime minister or a new cabinet. On 20 May, it was announced that Tshisekedi and Kabila had reached a deal, deciding to appoint the career civil servant and Kabila ally Sylvestre Ilunga as prime minister. Due to the pro-Kabila parties having the majority in parliament, they have the constitutional power to nominate the candidate for the head of government. On 27 July 2019, more than six months after the election the President and the parliament came to an agreement on forming a new government, beginning Ilunga's formal nomination process for prime minister. Ilunga's new cabinet will include 65 members, of which 42 will go to FCC candidates. Notably, the ministries of Defense, Justice, and Finance will be controlled by the Kabila coalition.
