= Heading for Change =

Political coalition in the Democratic Republic of the Congo

Heading for Change (French: Cap pour le changement, CACH) is a political coalition in the Democratic Republic of the Congo between Félix Tshisekedi's Union for Democracy and Social Progress (UDPS) and Vital Kamerhe's Union for the Congolese Nation (UNC). It was formed in response to the aftermath of multi-day negotiations between seven major opposition parties in Geneva, including the UDPS and UNC. When, on 11 November 2018, the negotiations made the unexpected choice of Martin Fayulu as their candidate and the formation of the Lamuka ("wake") coalition, rank and file supporters of the UDPS began violent protests in Limete, the party's headquarters, with some even threatening to burn down the hq building, in protest of Fayulu's nomination. Similar protests by UNC supporters broke out in the Stade des Martyrs. Succumbing to the pressure, both leaders withdrew their signatures in less than 24 hours, with Tshikendi claiming he had been tricked into voting for Fayulu. Later, on 23 November, in Nairobi, the leaders agreed to create the coalition and support Tshikendi as its presidential candidate.

Tshisekedi would go on to win the presidency, despite most independent observers, including the Catholic Church, believing that opposition candidate Martin Fayulu had actually won in a landslide. They believe that outgoing President Joseph Kabila, realising that a chosen successor candidate couldn't credibly win, struck a deal with Tshisekedi to make him president while Kabila governed jointly with him. The coalition only won a minority in the 2018 general election and 2019 Senate election. The uneasy coalition between CACH and Kabila's majority FFC was formalized in March 2019.

Much like previous power-sharing deals, the CAHA-FCC alliance proved to be ineffective in providing national security and addressing the economic challenges faced by the country such as its people's poor living conditions. The alliance encountered significant internal conflicts, which emerged when Tshisekedi made critical appointments to military leadership and civilian courts without seeking the endorsement of the FCC, among other points of contention.

On 6 December 2020, following extensive consultations with political parties and influential figures, Tshisekedi declared in a national address his intention to break off from the FCC and form a new coalition. After the subsequent four-month-long power struggle, the new coalition, the Sacred Union of the Nation (USN), was able to take control of the government in April 2021. CACH is a part of the USN.

In 2021, the UNC withdrew from CACH and USN meetings in response to Kamhere's sentencing by the Kinshasa/Gombe Court of Appeals to 13 years of forced labor for embezzlement as part of the prefabricated houses component of Tshisekedi's 100 Days program. The UNC saw it as a political plot aimed at removing him from the political scene and especially from the 2023 presidential election. Later, in 2022, in its second appeal decision, the Kinshasa/Gombe Court of Appeals acquitted Kamerhe, saying there had not been enough evidence for a prosecution. On August 19 2023, the UNC nominated Félix Tshisekedi as its candidate for the 2023 election. According to Congo Nouveau, the members of the party justified their decision as a desire to complete all the actions of the joint program designed with its partner UDPS within the framework of the advent of the CACH.
