= Jean-Philibert Mabaya =

Jean-Philibert Mabaya Gizi Amine (born 6 September 1949, Masi-Manimba, Belgian Congo) is a Congolese businessman, engineer, and politician who was a candidate in the 2018 Democratic Republic of the Congo presidential election. He is currently a Senator for the Kwilu Province.
