= Emmanuel Ramazani Shadary =

Congolese politician

Deputy Prime Minister Minister of the Interior and Security
- In office 19 December 2016 – 26 February 2018
- President: Joseph Kabila
- Prime Minister: Samy Badibanga; Bruno Tshibala
- Preceded by: Évariste Boshab
- Succeeded by: Henri Mova Sakanyi

Secretary of the People's Party for Reconstruction and Democracy
- Incumbent
- Assumed office 26 February 2018
- Preceded by: Henri Mova Sakanyi

Personal details
- Born: 29 November 1960 (age 65) Kasongo, Maniema, Democratic Republic of the Congo
- Education: University of Lubumbashi; University of Kinshasa
- Occupation: Politician

Emmanuel Ramazani Shadary (born 29 November 1960) is a politician in the Democratic Republic of the Congo, who was a presidential candidate in the December 2018 presidential elections in the country. He was selected following consultations within the ruling People's Party for Reconstruction and Democracy (PPRD) political party and the Common Front for Congo (FCC), political coalition. Shadary is the permanent secretary of the PPRD, and has previously served as the country's Interior Minister.

He has also served as the governor of the Maniema Province and is a member of the current Parliament of the Democratic Republic of the Congo.

On 16 December 2025, Shadary was arrested at his home in Kinshasa.

== See also ==
- Joseph Kabila
- Laurent Kabila
