= Politics of the Democratic Republic of the Congo =

Politics of the Democratic Republic of the Congo Politique en république démocratique du Congo
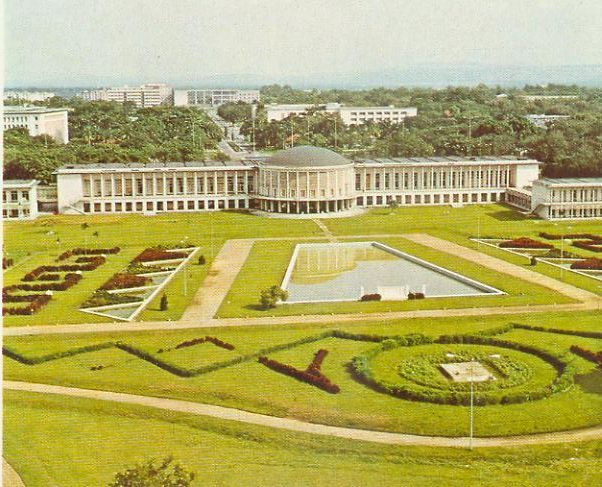
- The Palace of the Nation, the working residence of the president of the Democratic Republic of the Congo.
- Constitution: Constitution of the Third Republic

Legislative branch
- Name: Parliament
- Type: Bicameral
- Meeting place: Palace of the People, Kinshasa
- Upper house
- Name: Senate
- Presiding officer: Sama Lukonde, President
- Appointer: Indirect elections by provincial legislatures
- Lower house
- Name: National Assembly
- Presiding officer: Aimé Boji, President
- Appointer: Direct popular vote in first-past-the-post or proportional representation electoral districts

Executive branch
- Head of state
- Title: President
- Currently: Félix Tshisekedi
- Appointer: Direct popular vote
- Head of government
- Title: Prime Minister
- Currently: Judith Suminwa
- Appointer: President
- Cabinet
- Name: Government
- Current cabinet: Suminwa government
- Leader: Prime Minister
- Appointer: President
- Headquarters: Kinshasa
- Ministries: 39

Judicial branch
- Name: Judiciary
- Constitutional Court
- Chief judge: Dieudonné Kamuleta
- Court of Cassation
- Council of State

The politics of the Democratic Republic of the Congo take place in the context of a decentralised unitary semi-presidential republic of 25 provinces and the city-province of Kinshasa. The president is the head of state, elected by universal suffrage for a term of five years, while the prime minister is the head of government appointed by the president with the support of the parliament. The prime minister and the cabinet are responsible to the legislative branch, a bicameral legislature consisting of the National Assembly, with members that are directly elected, and the Senate, with members that are indirectly elected by provincial legislatures. The constitution describes an independent judiciary, which includes the Constitutional Court, the Court of Cassation, and the Council of State. The current political structure of the DRC is known as the Third Republic, which was proclaimed on 29 May 1997, though the current constitution was not promulgated until 18 February 2006.

Since 1996, the Democratic Republic of Congo has been a battleground, starting with neighboring states invading Zaire, which ended the 32-year rule of Mobutu Sese Seko and saw Laurent-Désiré Kabila becoming the new president. These conflicts originated from the 1994 Rwandan genocide and subsequent destabilization of the DRC's eastern region. Nine African countries became involved directly, with many more offering military, financial, and political support. Internal rebellions further complicated matters. This led to a severe humanitarian crisis. In 2001, Laurent-Désiré was killed, and his son Joseph Kabila took over as the leader of the country. Under the new president's leadership, efforts were made to bring an end to the presence of foreign troops in the eastern DRC, instead a cooperative approach was adopted, focusing on diplomatic discussions to resolve conflicts. This led to peace accords in 2002 that intended to reunify the country and establish a transitional government to draft a constitution and organize elections within three years.

The transitional cabinet took office in June 2003, and the two houses of parliament were set up in July 2003, with the seats distributed among political parties and warring factions. An election commission was established in November 2004. Work on a draft constitution began in February 2005, and it was approved by parliament in May 2005, before passing a national referendum in December 2005 with 82% of the vote. The DRC's first free general election in over four decades was held in July 2006, with a presidential run-off in October 2006, won by Joseph Kabila. Kabila is credited with ending the war, restoring stability to most of the country, and establishing a unified government and army. However, his 18-year administration also came to be known for corruption, electoral fraud, and limited reform, and curtailed democracy and civil liberties. Kabila faced allegations of fraud in his re-election in 2011, and when his constitutional mandate expired in 2016 he extended his term for another two years.

In 2019, Félix Tshisekedi succeeded Kabila after the contentious 2018 election, in the DRC's first peaceful transition of power since independence. Since then, democratic institutions have continued to decline as the political system is dominated by the president and his family, whose re-election in 2023 was marred by allegations of fraud. National general elections in 2006, 2011, 2018, and 2023 have seen high voter turnouts. As of 2024, there were over 1,000 political parties registered in the DRC. The most prominent include Félix Tshisekedi's Union for Democracy and Social Progress (UDPS), Joseph Kabila's People's Party for Reconstruction and Democracy (PPRD), Moïse Katumbi's Together for the Republic (EPR), Jean-Pierre Bemba's Movement for the Liberation of the Congo (MLC), and Vital Kamerhe's Union for the Congolese Nation (UNC).

== Political history ==
From the day of the arguably ill-prepared independence of the Democratic Republic of the Congo, the tensions between the powerful leaders of the political elite, such as Joseph Kasa Vubu, Patrice Lumumba, Moise Tshombe, Joseph Mobutu and others, jeopardize the political stability of the new state. From Tshombe's secession of the Katanga, to the assassination of Lumumba, to the two coups d'état of Mobutu, the country has known periods of nationwide peace, but virtually no period of genuine democratic rule.

=== The Mobutu era ===
The regime of President Mobutu Sese Seko lasted 32 years (1965–1997), during which all but the first seven years the country was named Zaire. His dictatorship operated as a one-party state, which saw most of the powers concentrated between President Mobutu, who was simultaneously the head of both the party and the state through the Popular Movement of the Revolution (MPR), and a series of essentially rubber-stamping institutions.

One particularity of the Regime was the claim to be thriving for an authentic system, different from Western or Soviet influences. This lasted roughly between the establishment of Zaire in 1971, and the official beginning of the transition towards democracy, on 24 April 1990. This was true at the regular people's level as everywhere else. People were ordered by law to drop their Western Christian names; the titles Mr. and Mrs. were abandoned for the male and female versions of the French word for "citizen"; Men were forbidden to wear suits, and women to wear pants. At the institutional level, many of the institutions also changed denominations, but the result was a system that borrowed from both systems:

- The MPR's Central Committee: Under the system of the "party-state", this committee had a higher position in the institutional make-up than the government or cabinet. It had both executive oversight authority, and in practice, binding legislative authority, as it dictated the party platform. Mobutu headed the Central Committee as Founding-President. The vice-president of the Central Committee was essentially the country's vice president, without the succession rights.
- The Executive Council: Known elsewhere as the Government or the Cabinet, this council was the executive authority in the country, made of State Commissioners (known elsewhere as ministers). For a long period of time, Mobutu was the sole leader of the Executive Council. He eventually would appoint First State Commissioners (known elsewhere as prime ministers) with largely coordinating powers and very little executive power. The last "First State Commissioner" was Kengo Wa Dondo.
- The Legislative Council: essentially the rubber-stamp parliament, it was made up of People Commissioners (known elsewhere as MPs), who were sometimes elected, as individual members of the MPR, and always on the party platform.
- The Supreme Court: As the judiciary, this court was seemingly the only independent branch of government, but in effect it was subordinate to a Judicial Council over which the regime had a very strong influence.

Every corporation, whether financial or union, as well as every division of the administration, was set up as branches of the party. CEOs, union leaders, and division directors were each sworn in as section presidents of the party. Every aspect of life was regulated to some degree by the party, and the will of its founding-president, Mobutu Sese Seko.

Most of the petty aspects of the regime disappeared after 1990 with the beginning of the democratic transition. Democratization would prove to be fairly short-lived, as Mobutu's power plays dragged it in length until ultimately 1997, when forces led by Laurent Kabila eventually successfully toppled the regime, after a 9-month-long military campaign.

=== The Kabilas' governments and war ===
The government of former president Mobutu Sese Seko was toppled by a rebellion led by Laurent Kabila in May 1997, with the support of Rwanda and Uganda. They were later to turn against Kabila and backed a rebellion against him in August 1998. Troops from Zimbabwe, Angola, Namibia, Chad, and Sudan intervened to support the Kinshasa regime. A cease-fire was signed on 10 July 1999 by the DROC, Zimbabwe, Angola, Uganda, Namibia, Rwanda, and Congolese armed rebel groups, but fighting continued.

Under Laurent Kabila's regime, all executive, legislative, and military powers were first vested in the President, Laurent-Désiré Kabila. The judiciary was independent, with the president having the power to dismiss or appoint. The president was first head of a 26-member cabinet dominated by the Alliance of Democratic Forces for the Liberation of Congo (ADFL). Towards the end of the 90s, Laurent Kabila created and appointed a Transitional Parliament, with a seat in the buildings of the former Katanga Parliament, in the southern town of Lubumbashi, in a move to unite the country, and to legitimate his regime. Kabila was assassinated on 16 January 2001 and his son Joseph Kabila was named head of state ten days later.

Initially underestimated as a mere figurehead chosen by his father's advisors, Kabila surprised many by quickly asserting his authority and turning the government in new directions. Shortly after taking office, he went on his first international trip, where he engaged in diplomatic talks with leaders from France, Belgium, and the United States, including the Secretary of State Colin Powell, as well as officials from global institutions like the World Bank, the International Monetary Fund, and the United Nations. During his visit to the United States, he met with Paul Kagame, the Rwandan president, despite their past differences. In a significant move in February 2001, Kabila committed to implementing a ceasefire agreement signed in July 1999, which had previously been disregarded by all involved. He initiated discussions with rebel groups and negotiated the withdrawal of troops from Rwanda, Uganda, Zimbabwe, Angola, and Namibia, which had a military presence in Congo. UN peacekeepers were deployed in March to oversee the ceasefire and troop withdrawals.

The younger Kabila continued with his father's Transitional Parliament, but overhauled his entire cabinet, replacing it with a group of technocrats, with the stated aim of putting the country back on the track of development, and coming to a decisive end of the Second Congo War. In October 2002, the new president was successful in getting occupying Rwandan forces to withdraw from eastern Congo; two months later, an agreement was signed by all remaining warring parties to end the fighting and set up a Transition Government, the make-up of which would allow representation for all negotiating parties. Two founding documents emerged from this: The Transition Constitution, and the Global and Inclusive Agreement, both of which describe and determine the make-up and organization of the Congolese institutions, until planned elections in July 2006, at which time the provisions of the new constitution, democratically approved by referendum in December 2005, will take full effect and that is how it happened.

Under the Global and All-Inclusive Agreement, signed on 17 December 2002, in Pretoria, there was to be one President and four Vice-Presidents, one from the government, one from the Rally for Congolese Democracy, one from the MLC, and one from civil society. The position of vice-president expired after the 2006 elections.

After being for three years (2003–2006) in the interregnum between two constitutions, the Democratic Republic of the Congo is now under the regime of the Constitution of the Third Republic. The constitution, adopted by referendum in 2005, and promulgated by President Joseph Kabila in February 2006, establishes a decentralized semi-presidential republic, with a separation of powers between the three branches of government – executive, legislative and judiciary, and a distribution of prerogatives between the central government and the provinces.

In September 2016, violent protests were met with brutal force by the police and Republican Guard soldiers. Opposition groups claim 80 dead, including the Students' Union leader. From 19 September Kinshasa residents, as well as residents elsewhere in Congo, where mostly confined to their homes. Police arrested anyone remotely connected to the opposition as well as innocent onlookers. Government propaganda, on television, and actions of covert government groups in the streets, acted against opposition as well as foreigners. The president's mandate was due to end on 19 December 2016, but no plans were made to elect a replacement at that time and this caused further protests.

As of 8 August 2017 there are 54 political parties legally operating in the Congo.

On 15 December 2018 US State Department announced it had decided to evacuate its employees’ family members from Democratic Republic of Congo just before the Congolese elections to choose a successor to President Joseph Kabila.

=== Félix Tshisekedi Presidency (2019–present) ===
On 30 December 2018 the presidential election to determine the successor to Kabila was held. On 10 January 2019, the electoral commission announced opposition candidate Félix Tshisekedi as the winner of the vote. He was officially sworn in as president on 24 January 2019. In the ceremony of taking of the office Félix Tshisekedi appointed Vital Kamerhe as his chief of staff. In June 2020, chief of staff Vital Kamerhe was found guilty of embezzling public funds and he was sentenced to 20 years in prison. His initial campaign pledged to enhance living standards in the DRC, a country abundant in minerals but plagued by widespread poverty among its 100 million people, and to bring an end to 25 years of violence in the eastern region.

The political allies of former president Joseph Kabila, who stepped down in January 2019, maintained control of key ministries, the legislature, judiciary and security services. However, President Felix Tshisekedi succeeded to strengthen his hold on power. In a series of moves, he won over more legislators, gaining the support of almost 400 out of 500 members of the National Assembly. The pro-Kabila speakers of both houses of parliament were forced out. In April 2021, the new government was formed without the supporters of Kabila. President Felix Tshisekedi succeeded to oust the last remaining elements of his government who were loyal to former leader Joseph Kabila.

After the 2023 presidential election, Tshisekedi had a clear lead in his run for a second term. Despite the economic growth, numerous Congolese citizens were voicing concerns about the decline of the Congolese franc, which is significantly affecting their everyday experiences. Despite the nation's abundant mineral resources and sizable population, the quality of life has not substantially improved for the majority, as conflict, corruption, and inadequate governance continue to endure. During his reelection campaign, he reiterated promises from five years prior, including job creation, enhancing economic stability, and addressing the persistent insecurity that has plagued the eastern region for thirty years, resulting in the loss of millions of lives. On 20 December 2023, official said that President Felix Tshisekedi had been re-elected with 73% of the vote. Nine opposition candidates signed a declaration rejecting the election and called for a rerun. In January, following the election, the major opposition candidate, Moise Katumbi was momentarily placed under house arrest but this was quickly rectified by the governor of Haut-Katanga province. The ruling party, President Tshisekedi's UDPS, won the majority of seats in general elections, winning 69 seats in the 500-member National Assembly ahead of 44 other parties.

In October 2025, former president Joseph Kabila, was sentenced to death in absentia for alleged collaboration with the rebel group M23.

== Executive branch ==
Since the July 2006 elections, the country is led by a semi-presidential, strongly-decentralized state. The executive at the central level, is divided between the President, and a Prime Minister appointed by him/her from the party having the majority of seats in Parlement. Should there be no clear majority, the President can appoint a "government former" that will then have the task to win the confidence of the National Assembly. The President appoints the government members (ministers) at the proposal of the Prime Minister. In coordination, the President and the government are in charge of the executive, but the Prime minister and the government are responsible to the lower-house of Parliament, the National Assembly.

At the province level, the Provincial legislature (Provincial Assembly) elects a governor, and the governor, with his government of up to 10 ministers, is in charge of the provincial executive. Some domains of government power are of the exclusive provision of the Province, and some are held concurrently with the Central government. This is not a Federal state; however, it is simply a decentralized one, as the majority of the domains of power are still vested in the Central government. The governor is responsible to the Provincial Assembly.

=== Criticisms ===
The semi-presidential system has been described by some as "conflictogenic" and "dictatogenic", as it ensures frictions, and a reduction of pace in government life, should the President and the Prime Minister be from different sides of the political arena. This was seen several times in France, a country that shares the semi-presidential model. It was also, arguably, in the first steps of the Congo into independence, the underlying cause of the crisis between Prime Minister Patrice Lumumba and President Joseph Kasa Vubu, who ultimately dismissed each other, in 1960.

In January 2015 the 2015 Congolese protests broke out in the country's capital following the release of a draft law that would extend the presidential term limits and allow Joseph Kabila to run again for office.

== Legislative branch ==
Palais du Peuple, seat of the parliament in Kinshasa

=== Under the transitional constitution ===
The Inter-Congolese dialogue, that set-up the transitional institutions, created a bicameral parliament, with a National Assembly and Senate, made up of appointed representatives of the parties to the dialogue. These parties included the preceding government, the rebel groups that were fighting against the government, with heavy Rwandan and Ugandan support, the internal opposition parties, and the Civil Society. At the beginning of the transition, and up until recently, the National Assembly is headed by the MLC with Speaker Hon. Olivier Kamitatu, while the Senate is headed by a representative of the Civil Society, namely the head of the Church of Christ in Congo, Mgr. Pierre Marini Bodho. Hon. Kamitatu has since left both the MLC and the Parliament to create his own party, and ally with current President Joseph Kabila. Since then, the position of Speaker is held by Hon. Thomas Luhaka, of the MLC.

Aside from the regular legislative duties, the Senate had the charge to draft a new constitution for the country. That constitution was adopted by referendum in December 2005, and decreed into law on 18 February 2006.

=== Under the new constitution ===
The Parliament of the third republic is also bicameral, with a National Assembly and a Senate. Members of the National Assembly, the lower – but the most powerful – house, are elected by direct suffrage. Senators are elected by the legislatures of the 26 provinces.

== Administrative divisions ==
=== Under the transitional constitution ===
10 provinces (provinces, singular – province) and one city* (ville): Bandundu, Bas-Congo, Équateur, Kasai-Occidental, Kasai-Oriental, Katanga, Kinshasa*, Maniema, North Kivu, Orientale.

Each province is divided into districts and cities.

=== Under the new constitution ===
25 provinces (provinces, singular – province) and city* (ville): Bas-Uele | Équateur | Haut-Lomami | Haut-Katanga | Haut-Uele | Ituri | Kasaï | Kasaï oriental | Kongo central | Kwango | Kwilu | Lomami | Lualaba | Lulua | Mai-Ndombe | Maniema | Mongala | North Kivu | Nord-Ubangi | Sankuru | South Kivu | Sud-Ubangi | Tanganyika | Tshopo | Tshuapa | Kinshasa*

Each province is divided into territories and cities.

== Political parties and elections ==
=== Presidential elections ===
Candidate	Party	Votes	%
Félix Tshisekedi	Union for Democracy and Social Progress	7,051,013	38.56
Martin Fayulu	Dynamic of Congolese Political Opposition	6,366,732	34.82
Emmanuel Ramazani Shadary	Common Front for Congo	4,357,359	23.83
Radjabho Tebabho Soborabo	Congolese United for Reform	70,249	0.38
Vital Kamerhe	Union for the Congolese Nation	51,380	0.28
Pierre Honoré Kazadi Lukonda Ngube-Ngube	People's Front for Justice	44,019	0.24
Théodore Ngoy	Independent	43,697	0.24
Freddy Matungulu	Our Congo	33,273	0.18
Marie-Josée Ifoku	Alliance of Elites for a New Congo	27,313	0.15
Jean-Philibert Mabaya	Rainbow of Congo	26,907	0.15
Samy Badibanga	The Progressives	26,722	0.15
Alain Daniel Shekomba	Independent	26,611	0.15
Seth Kikuni	Independent	23,552	0.13
Noël Kabamba Tshiani Muadiamvita	Independent	23,548	0.13
Charles Luntadila	Independent	20,182	0.11
Yves Mpunga	Premier Political Force	18,976	0.10
Tryphon Kin-Kiey Mulumba	Independent	16,596	0.09
Gabriel Mokia Mandembo	Movement of Congolese Democrats	15,778	0.09
Francis Mvemba	Independent	15,013	0.08
Sylvain Maurice Masheke	Independent	14,337	0.08
Joseph Maluta	Independent	11,562	0.06
Total		18,284,819	100.00
Valid votes		18,280,820	99.74
Invalid/blank votes		48,498	0.26
Total votes		18,329,318	100.00
Registered voters/turnout		38,542,138	47.56
Source: African Union (Note: There is a difference of 3,999 between the reported number of valid votes (18,280,820) and the reported totals for each candidate.)

=== Parliamentary elections ===
Party	Seats
People's Party for Reconstruction and Democracy	50
Alliance of the Democratic Forces of Congo	41
Union for Democracy and Social Progress	32
Alternative Action for Wellbeing and Change	30
People's Party for Peace and Democracy	25
Social Movement	24
Alliance of Actors for Good Governance of Congo	23
Alliance for the Future	22
Movement for the Liberation of the Congo	22
Alliance of Democrats for Renewal and Progress	22
Alliance of Movements of Kongo	22
Unified Lumumbist Party	17
Union for the Congolese Nation	16
Future of the Congo	12
Alliance of Construction for an Emergent Congo	11
Rally for the Reconstruction of Congo	11
Group of 7	11
Action of Allies to Improve Living Conditions for the Congolese	10
Christian Democratic Party	10
Alliance for the Overall Transformation of Congo	10
Alliance for Democratic Alternative	10
Alternative for the Republic	9
Alliance	8
Stand Up Congo	8
Progressists' Convention for the Republic	8
Dynamic of Congolese Political Opposition	8
Movement for the Integrity of the People	7
Alliance in the Unity	6
Rainbow of Congo	5
Group 18	4
Alliance of Progressives for Congo	3
Avançons	1
Party for the People's Revolution	1
United for the Republic	1
Total	500
Source: IPU

== International organization participation ==
- ACCT, ACP, AfDB, AU, CEEAC, CEPGL, East African Community, ECA, FAO, G-19, G-24, G-77, IAEA, IBRD, ICAO, ICC, ICRM, IDA, IFAD, IFC, IFRCS, IHO, ILO, IMF, UN, UNCTAD, UNESCO, UNHCR, UNIDO, UPU, WCO WFTU, WHO, WIPO, WMO, WToO, WTrO

== See also ==
- Mass media in the Democratic Republic of the Congo

== Bibliography ==
- "Congo, Democratic Republic of the". The World Factbook. Central Intelligence Agency. Archived from the original on 22 February 2021.
- "Congo (Democratic Republic of the) 2005 (rev. 2011)". Translated by Ruchti, Jefri J. Comparative Constitution Project.
- Reyntjens, Filip (2009). The Great African War: Congo and Regional Geopolitics, 1996–2006. Cambridge: Cambridge University Press. ISBN 978-0-521-11128-7.
