= President of the Democratic Republic of the Congo =

Head of state

- Président de la République démocratique du Congo (French); Rais wa Jamhuri ya Kidemokrasia ya Kongo (Swahili); Mokonzi wa Republíki ya Kongó Demokratíki (Lingala)
- Presidential Seal

- Presidential Standard

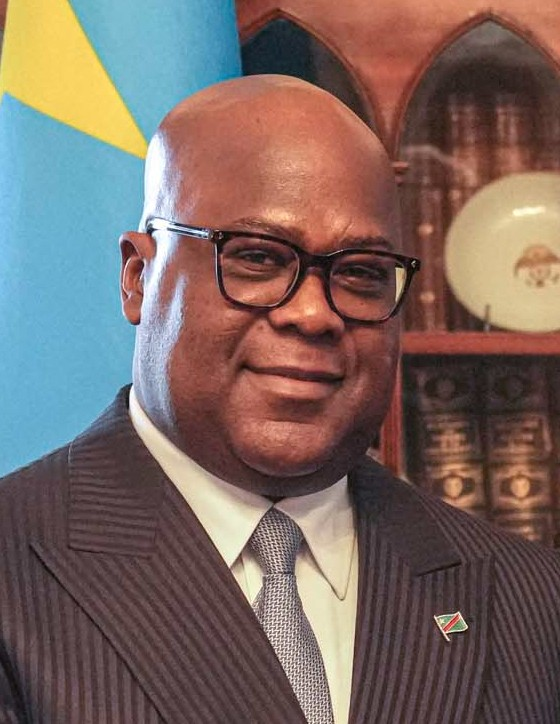
- Incumbent; Félix Tshisekedi since 25 January 2019
- Style: His Excellency
- Type: Head of state
- Residence: Palais de la Nation, Kinshasa
- Term length: 5 years, renewable once
- Constituting instrument: Constitution of the Democratic Republic of the Congo (2006)
- Formation: 30 June 1960; 66 years ago
- First holder: Joseph Kasavubu
- Deputy: President of the Senate
- Website: Official website of the President of the DRC

The president of the Democratic Republic of the Congo (French: Président de la République démocratique du Congo, Swahili: Rais wa Jamhuri ya Kidemokrasia ya Kongo, Lingala: Mokonzi wa Republíki ya Kongó Demokratíki) is the head of state of the Democratic Republic of the Congo and commander-in-chief of the armed forces.

The position of president in the DRC has existed since the first constitution – known as The Fundamental Law – of 1960. However the powers of this position have varied over the years, from a limited shared role in the executive branch, with a prime minister, to a dictatorship. Under the current constitution, the President exists as the highest institution in a semi-presidential republic. The president is protected by the Republican Guard. The constitutional mandate of the then president, Joseph Kabila, was due to expire on 20 December 2016 but was initially extended by him until the end of 2017 and he continued to remain in post until a presidential election was held in December 2018 when Félix Tshisekedi was elected and took office on 24 January 2019.

== Presidential powers ==
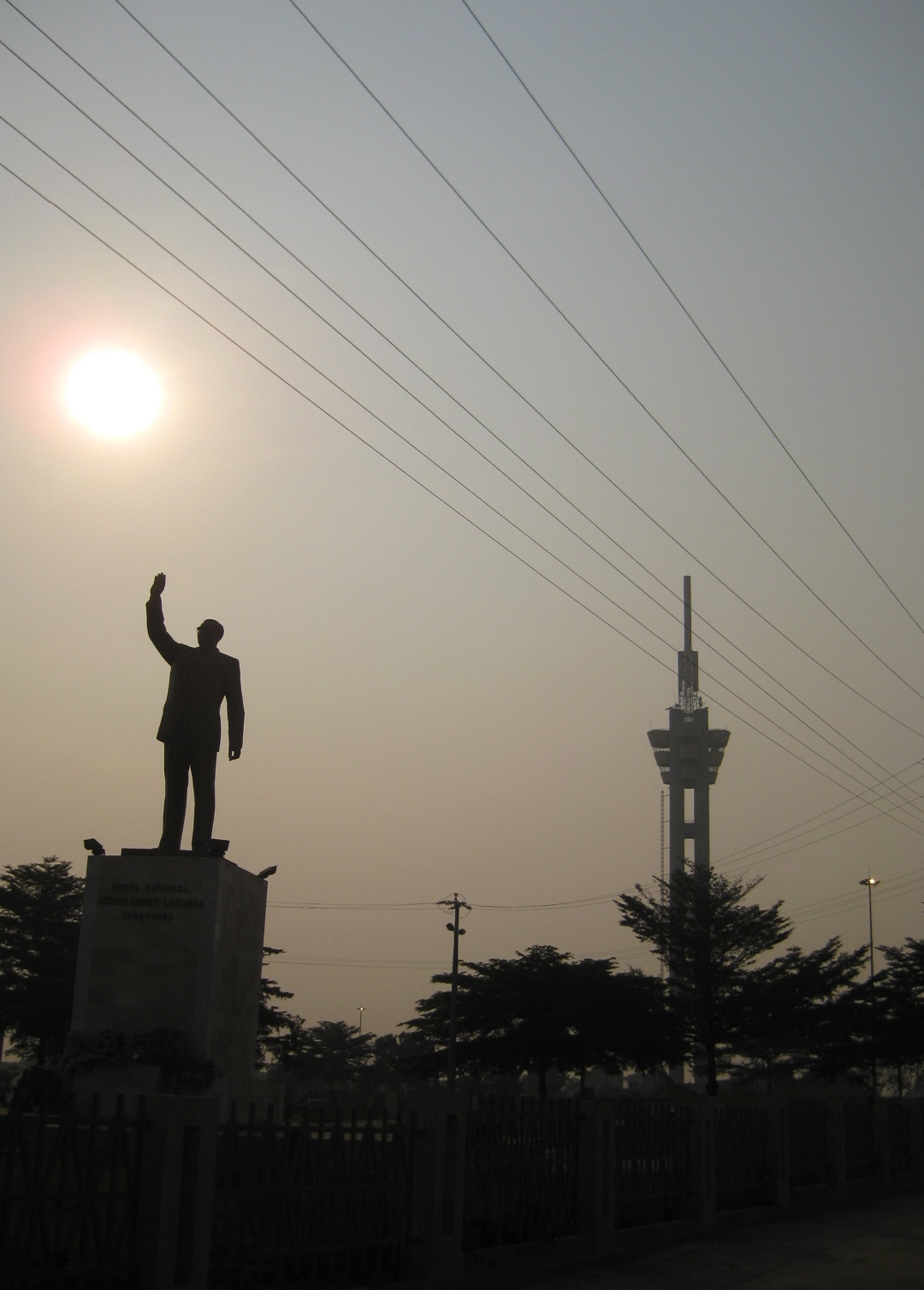
Monument to Lumumba and the Tower of Limete.

The semi-presidential system established by the constitution is largely borrowed from the French constitution. Although it is the prime minister and parliament that oversee much of the nation's actual lawmaking, the president wields significant influence, both formally and from constitutional convention. The president holds the nation's most senior office, and outranks all other politicians.

The president is able to choose the prime minister. However, the President must nominate the prime minister from among the parliamentary majority after consultation with the parliamentary majority, if an obvious majority exists, and if it does not exist, must nominate a prime minister who has a once renewable 30 day exploratory mandate to form a coalition. The prime minister and cabinet must present their plan of action to the National Assembly, which must approve the government and the plan of action by an absolute majority. Only the National Assembly has the power to dismiss the prime minister's government.

- When the majority of the Assembly has opposite political views to that of the president, this leads to political cohabitation. In that case, the president's power is diminished, since much of the de facto power relies on a supportive prime minister and National Assembly, and is not directly attributed to the post of president. Still, the constitutional convention is that the president directs foreign policy, though he must work on that matter with the Minister of Foreign Affairs.
- When the majority of the Assembly sides with him, the President can take a more active role and may, in effect, direct government policy. The prime minister is often a mere "fuse" – and can be replaced if the administration becomes unpopular.

Among the formal powers of the president:

- The president ensures respect of the constitution and ensures the proper functioning of the public authorities and institutions as well as the continuity of the State. He guarantees the independence, territorial integrity, and sovereignty of the nation and ensures the observance of international treaties.
- The president appoints the Prime Minister and, acting on the advice of the latter, appoints and removes the other members of the government.
- The president convokes and presides at meetings of the Council of Ministers, promulgates the laws, and issues ordinances
- The president invests the elected Governors and Vice-Governors of the Provinces with their powers.
- The president appoints, suspends, and removes, on the proposal of the government and after deliberation by the Council of Ministers:
  - Ambassadors and other diplomatic personnel;
  - Officers of the armed forces and national police, after hearing the opinion of the High Defense Council;
  - The general chief of staff, the chiefs of staff and the commanders of the main branches of the armed forces, after hearing the opinion of the High Defense Council;
  - High-ranking civil servants;
  - Persons in charge of public services and establishments;
  - Representatives of the State (other than auditors) in public enterprises;
  - Judges and public prosecutors on the proposal of the High Council of the Judiciary.
- The president is the commander-in-chief of the armed forces and chairs the High Defense Council.
- The president confers national honors.
- The president may declare a state of emergency or a state of siege "When grave circumstances constitute a present threat to the independence or the integrity of the national territory or when they provoke the disruption of the proper functioning of the institutions."
- The president may declare war with the authorization of both chambers of parliament, after deliberation by the Council of Ministers, and after hearing the opinion of the High Defense Council.
- The President may grant pardons or commute or reduce sentences.
- The President appoints and accredits ambassadors to foreign countries and international organizations, and receives ambassadors accredited to the Democratic Republic of the Congo.
- The President defines national policy in coordination with the government and is responsible, in cooperation with the government, for defense, security, and foreign affairs.
- The president has a very limited form of suspensive veto: when presented with a law. The president can request another reading of it by parliament, but only once per law.

== Requirements ==
Article 72 of the Congolese constitution states that the President must be a natural-born citizen – or more accurately: French: citoyen d'origine – of the Democratic Republic of the Congo, and at least 30 years of age. Additionally, the President must be free of any legal constraints on their civil and political rights.

Article 10 of the same constitution defines citoyen d'origine as : "anyone belonging to the ethnic groups whose persons and territory constituted what became the Congo (currently the Democratic Republic of the Congo), at independence".

== Succession ==
Articles 75 and 76 of the constitution state that upon the death or resignation of the President, the vacancy of the position is declared by the Constitutional court. The President of the Senate then becomes interim president.

The Independent Electoral Commission has to organize elections between sixty (60) and ninety (90) days after the official declaration of vacancy by the Constitutional court.

== Other information ==
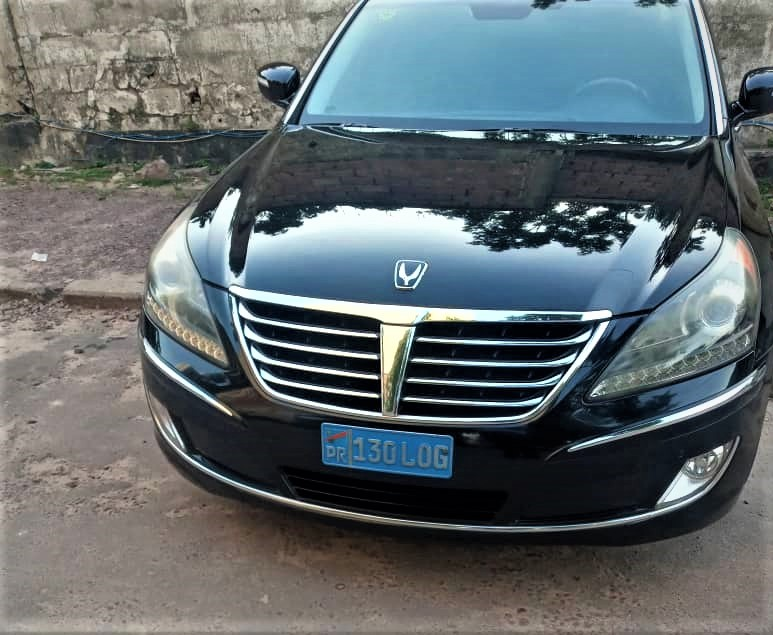
Presidential registration plate (PR)

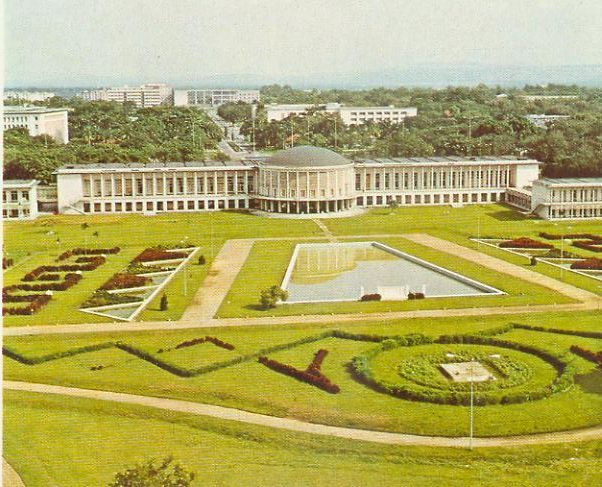
Palais de la Nation, Kinshasa

The official office of the president is the Palais de la Nation (Palace of the Nation) in Kinshasa.The official residence of the president is the Camp Tshatshi Palace in Kinshasa, although it has not been used since it was looted in 1997. Other presidential residences include:

- the Palais de Marbre; it houses foreign official guests;
- the Domaine de la Rwindi in Goma, Nord-Kivu.

== Elections ==
Under the 2006 constitution, the President is directly elected to a five-year term – renewable only once – by universal suffrage. The first President to have been elected under these provisions is Joseph Kabila, in the 2006 elections.

After the president is elected, he goes through a solemn investiture ceremony.

=== 2023 election ===
Candidate	Party	Votes	%
Félix Tshisekedi	Union for Democracy and Social Progress	13,058,962	73.47
Moïse Katumbi	Together for the Republic	3,256,572	18.32
Martin Fayulu	Commitment to Citizenship and Development	875,336	4.92
Adolphe Muzito	New Momentum	200,800	1.13
Soborabo Radjabho Tebabho	Congolese United for Change	70,099	0.39
Denis Mukwege	Independent	39,639	0.22
Aggrey Ngalasi Kurisini	Independent	37,201	0.21
Constant Mutamba	Revolutionary Progressive Dynamic	36,197	0.20
Jean-Claude Baende	Independent	25,584	0.14
Delly Sesanga	Flight	17,785	0.10
Loli Nkema Liloo Bokonzi	Independent	17,046	0.10
Patrice Majondo Mwamba	Independent	15,793	0.09
Marie-Josée Ifoku	Independent	15,266	0.09
Matata Ponyo Mapon	Leadership and Governance for Development	14,181	0.08
André Masalu Anedu	Independent	13,974	0.08
Floribert Anzuluni	Independent	13,707	0.08
Noël Tshiani	Independent	9,276	0.05
Seth Kikuni	Independent	8,621	0.05
Justin Mudekereza Bisimwa	Independent	7,573	0.04
Joëlle Bilé Batali	Independent	6,911	0.04
Franck Diongo	Progressive Lumumbist Movement	6,780	0.04
Tony Bolamba	Independent	6,307	0.04
Rex Kazadi Kanda	Independent	5,757	0.03
Georges Buse Falay	Independent	5,288	0.03
Enoch Ngila	Independent	5,156	0.03
Théodore Ngoy	Independent	4,132	0.02
Total		17,773,943	100.00
Valid votes		17,773,943	99.85
Invalid/blank votes		26,252	0.15
Total votes		17,800,195	100.00
Registered voters/turnout		41,738,628	42.65
Source: CENI as amended by the Constitutional Court

== See also ==
- Government of the Democratic Republic of the Congo
  - List of presidents of the Democratic Republic of the Congo
  - Prime Minister of the Democratic Republic of the Congo
  - List of prime ministers of the Democratic Republic of the Congo

Historical:

- Vice-Presidents of the Democratic Republic of the Congo
- Colonial Heads of Congo
  - Rulers of Katanga
  - Rulers of Kuba
  - Rulers of Luba
  - Rulers of Ruund (Luunda)
  - Rulers of Kasongo Luunda (Yaka)
  - Rulers of Kongo
- Zaire
