= 2023 Democratic Republic of the Congo general election =

- 20 December 2023
- Presidential election
- Registered: 41,738,628
- Turnout: 42.65% (▼4.92pp)
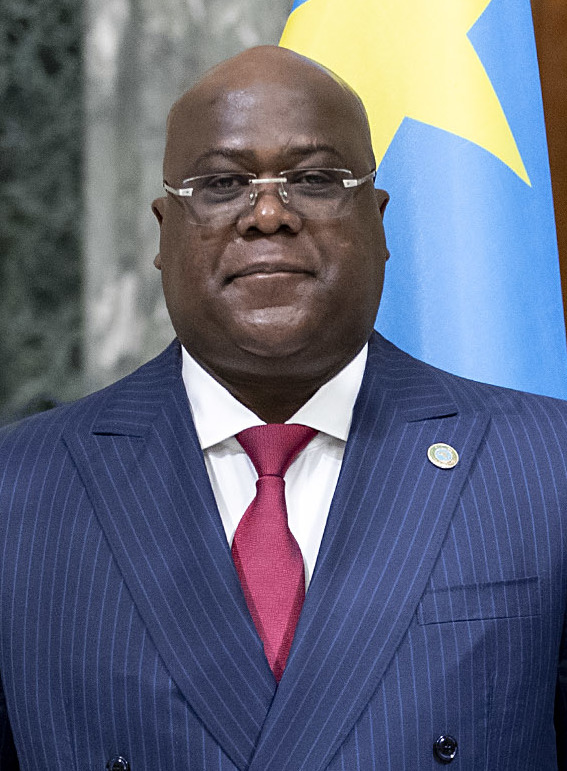

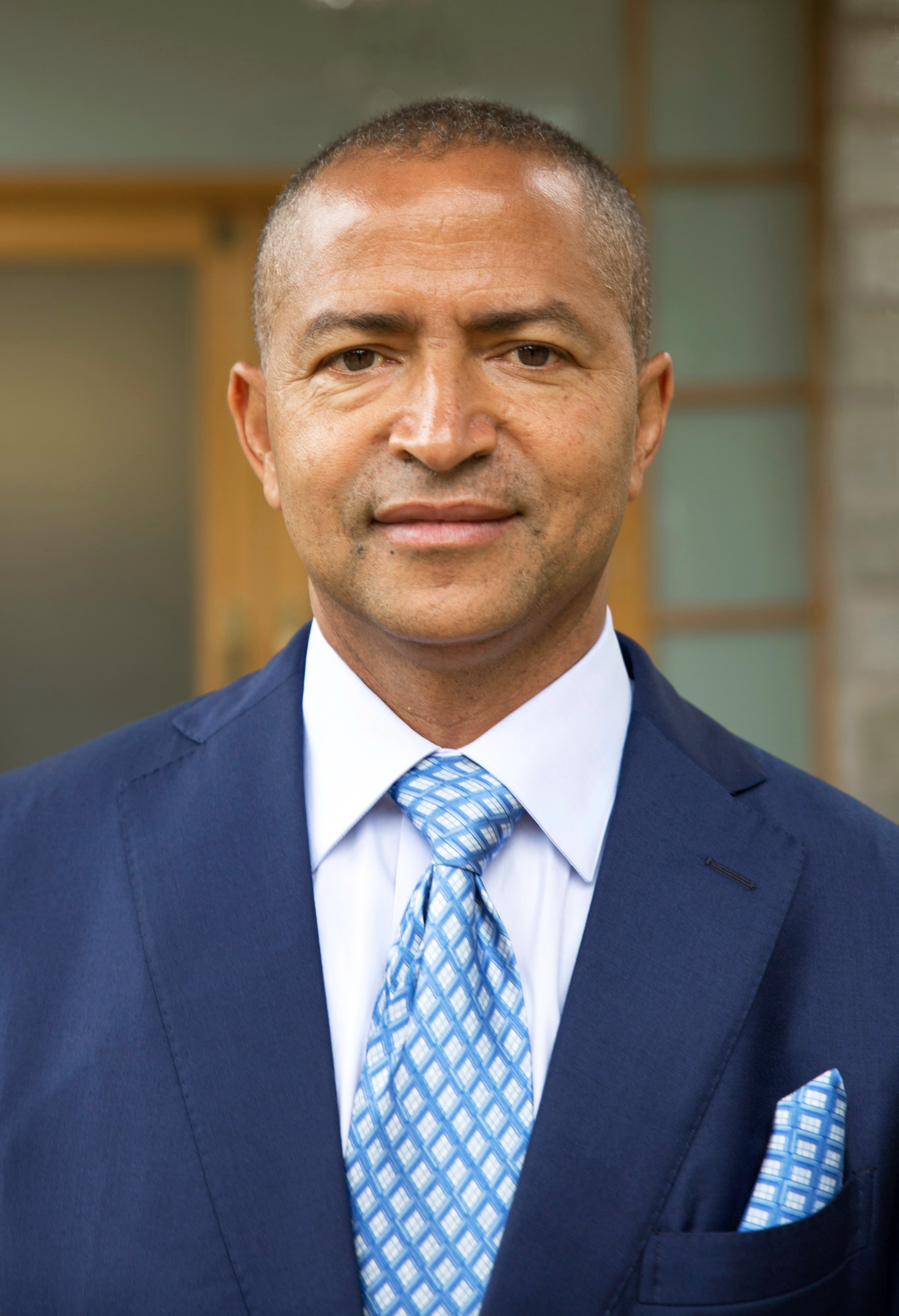
Nominee	Félix Tshisekedi	Moïse Katumbi
Party	UDPS	Ensemble
Alliance	USN	Congo ya Makasi
Popular vote	13,058,962	3,256,572
Percentage	73.47%	18.32%
President before election
Félix Tshisekedi
UDPS (USN)
Elected President
Félix Tshisekedi
UDPS (USN)
- Legislative election
- 484 of the 500 seat National Assembly; 251 seats needed for a majority
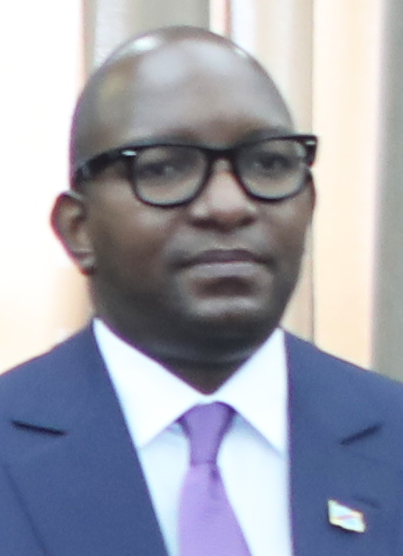

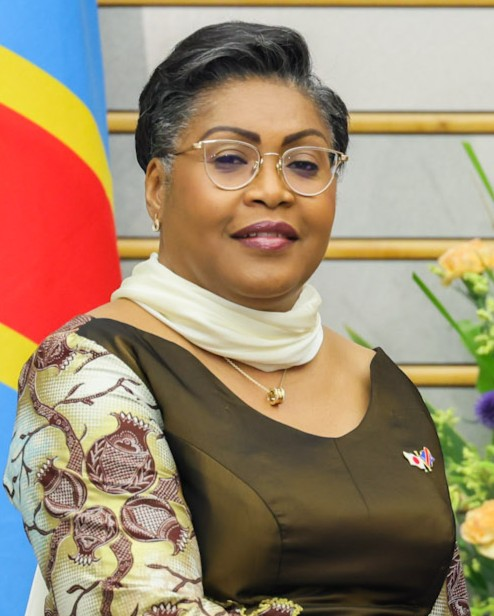
Prime Minister before	Prime Minister after
Sama Lukonde; ACO (USN)	Judith Suminwa; UDPS (USN)

General elections were held in the Democratic Republic of the Congo on 20 December 2023. Combined elections were held for the President, 484 of the 500 members of the National Assembly, 700 of the 716 elected members of the 26 provincial assemblies, and for the first time under the new constitution, 951 members of a scaled down number of commune (municipal) councils. On election day, the Independent National Electoral Commission (CENI), in violation of electoral law, extended voting to 21 December for polling stations that had not opened on 20 December. Some polling stations stayed open on their own accord for up to six extra days.

The election saw President Félix Tshisekedi win in a landslide victory with 73% of the vote, far ahead of his closest rival, former Katanga Province Governor Moïse Katumbi, who only won 18%, mostly from Katanga region. In the parliamentary election, while Tshisekedi's party only won 69 of the seats, his governing coalition, the Sacred Union of the Nation (USN), won nearly 450, more than 90% of the seats in the National Assembly. As Tshisekedi is dependent on his coalition, he had to compete for other key offices for his party through complex, time consuming negotiations, taking five months to form a government.

Preparations for the election were marred by significant shortcomings, including the distribution of poorly printed voter cards, many of which had become unreadable by the time of the election as they were issued earlier in the year. Voting was further disrupted by missing voter lists and other essential paperwork, broken or absent machinery, delayed openings of polling stations, and intimidation by security forces or individuals acting on behalf of candidates. These widespread issues contributed to the lowest voter turnout ever recorded, potentially disenfranchising millions of voters.

The election, while not excluding any candidate from running and being comparatively peaceful relative to previous elections, had extensive fraud. A domestic observation mission led jointly by the Catholic and various Protestant churches stated that "numerous irregularities affected the integrity of the results of all the polls in some places," such as reports of candidates acquiring voting machines and placing them in their private residences. The opposition called for a rerun of the presidential election but did not take their case to the Constitutional Court, which they see as lacking independence, instead urging street protests that failed to gain momentum. Riots did break out in Katanga over the parliamentary election, as USN members, sometimes fielding no-name candidates, had performed well compared to the presidential election. Katangan elites, excluded from national power in favor of Tshisekedi's allies from his native Kasaï region, are among Tshisekedi's most prominent critics and clashed with Kasaïans, whom many see as "immigrants," over local power in the region. International Crisis Group (ICG) predicted that Katanga could later oppose Tshisekedi more strongly, as opposition could call for greater power and resources to devolve to provincial authorities or "create momentum behind demands for secession, which [had] been largely rhetorical" prior to the ICG's report.

While election irregularities played a part in the opposition's poor performance, other factors included the opposition's failure to unite behind a single candidate, the decision of prominent opposition figures Martin Fayulu and Joseph Kabila to have their coalitions sit out the election, their campaign strategies, and the failure to build grassroots party structures in other regions. In contrast, Tshisekedi had the backing of major political figures, which provided him with a broad territorial network and a foothold in various regions of the country.

CENI later cancelled results in two constituencies and disqualified 82 candidates, mostly members of the USN, from national and local races for fraud. While the move to target mostly USN members may appear to further accountability, analysts, as well as the Catholic Church, stated that it created a precedent for CENI policing its own work and may have underestimated the amount of fraud.

Elections were not organized in the territories of Kwamouth, Masisi, and Rutshuru due to ongoing armed conflict.

== Background ==
=== 2018 electoral fraud ===
President Félix Tshisekedi's election in 2018 was extremely controversial, with most independent observers, including the Catholic Church, believing that opposition candidate Martin Fayulu had actually won in a landslide. They believe that outgoing President Joseph Kabila, realising that a chosen successor candidate couldn't credibly win, struck a deal with Tshisekedi to make him president while Kabila governed jointly with him.

According to Jacques Mukena, Senior Governance Researcher at Ebuteli Institute, the election will most likely not be completely free and fair, but believes Tshisekedi and CENI are aware of the fact that they would be under closer scrutiny than in 2018 because more local and international observers would be watching. Additionally, candidates such as Delly Sesanga have already declared that they would believe the Catholic Church's opinion of who won the elections, not CENI's.

According to the Crisis Group, there is a fear of a wider political crisis if losing candidates or their backers do not accept the presidential results. Any crisis, while not inevitable, could worsen the already dire situation in the east.

On 20 November, Fayulu advocated for transparent and impartial elections, he insisted that the Congolese "must no longer accept someone stealing their victory."

=== Insecurity ===
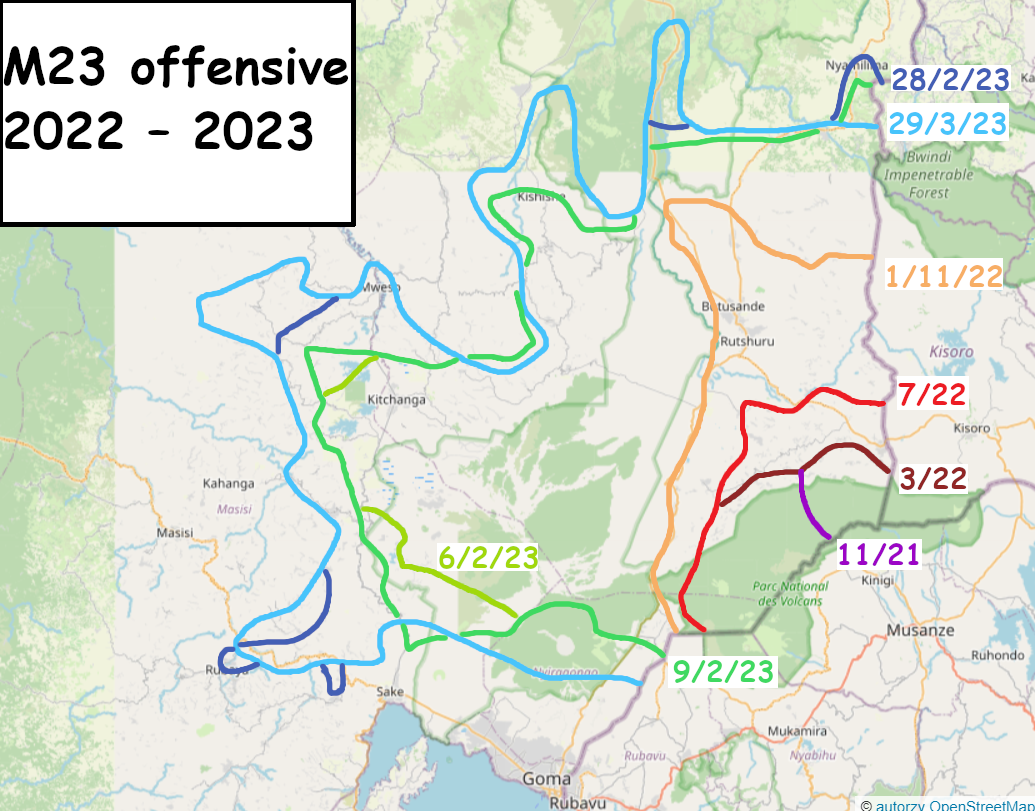
Map of the M23 offensive with Goma on the north shore of Lake Kivu at the bottom

The Democratic Republic of Congo has suffered from almost constant conflict in the east for the past 30 years. More recently, violence surged in the region after a new rebellion by the M23 group, supported by Rwanda, caused much of the North Kivu province to be occupied by rebels. This upsurge in violence comes as MONUSCO is expected to begin its "accelerated" withdrawal, as requested by Tshisekedi, after an almost 25-year presence in the country.

Due to this, two territories of the province will not be able to vote normally, but if Goma were to fall as it did in 2012, the whole process would be compromised.

With the possibility of over a million voters being disenfranchised from instability, the Southern African Development Community (SADC) has proposed sending a regional intervention force into eastern DRC to try to stabilise the area. The SADC Mission in the DRC was first proposed in May and was meant to go in by September but has been postponed, with its most recent summit concerning finance.

According to the Institute for Security Studies, it's hard to imagine the mission could go in and suppress all of eastern DRC's many armed rebel groups in time to enfranchise those voters.

== Schedule ==
Selected dates from the electoral calendar:

- 24 December 2022—17 March 2023: Voter registration.
  - 24 December—23 January (30 days): Registration in Kongo Central, Kinshasa, Kwango, Kwilu, Mai-Ndombe, Equateur, Mongala, Nord-Ubangi, Sud-Ubangi and Tshuapa provinces.
  - 25 January—23 February (30 days): Registration in Kasaï, Kasaï-Central, Kasaï-Oriental, Lomami, Sankuru, Haut-Lomami, Haut-Katanga, Lualaba and Tanganyika provinces; also for expatriates in South Africa, Belgium, and France.
  - 16 February—17 March (30 days): Registration in Bas-Uélé, Haut-Uélé, Ituri, Tshopo, North Kivu, South Kivu, and Maniema provinces; also for expatriates in Canada and the United States.
- 21 May 2023: Publication of registration statistics per electoral district—registration totals will determine the size of the provincial assemblies and of the local councils (commune, sector, and chiefdom councils). They are also used to apportion seats to electoral districts.
- 23 May 2023—15 June 2023: Proportional allocation of seats to electoral districts based on voter registration numbers; drafted and passed as a law.
- 26 June 2023—8 October 2023: Candidate registration.
  - 26 June—15 July (20 days): Candidates for the National Assembly.
  - 3 August—22 August (20 days): Candidates for provincial assemblies and commune councils.
  - 9 September–8 October (30 days): Candidates for president.
- 19 November 2023—18 December 2023: Electoral campaigns.
  - 19 November: Start of 30 day campaigns for president, National Assembly, and provincial assemblies.
  - 4 December: Start of 15 day campaigns for commune councils.
- 20 December 2023: Election day.
- 20 January 2024: Presidential swearing in ceremony.

== Electoral system ==
=== Presidential election ===
The president is elected by plurality voting in one round. For the first time, some Congolese living abroad were able to vote in the presidential election. These were those living in Belgium, Canada, France, South Africa, and the United States.

=== National Assembly, provincial assembly, and commune council elections ===
==== Electoral districts and seat allocation ====
Except for the four National Assembly districts of Kinshasa, all electoral districts are simply administrative subdivisions of the country; the four exceptions are themselves groupings of administrative divisions of Kinshasa.

Contested electoral districts of the 2023 general election
For	the Districts are		Total		
For	in Provinces	in Kinshasa	Districts	Seats	Candidates
National Assembly	territories^{a} and cities	Kinshasa I-IV^{b}	179 (64)^{c}	484	c. 25,000
26 Provincial assemblies	territories^{a} and cities	communes	199 (37)	700	c. 32,000
113 Commune councils	communes^{d}		113 (0)	951	c. 49,000
Notes: a) Postponed in the territories of Kwamouth, Masisi, and Rutshuru due to armed conflict. b) Kinshasa I: Lukunga, II: Funa, III: Mont-Amba, IV: Tshangu. c) Total single member districts in parentheses. d) Only the communes of Kinshasa and the 25 provincial capitals.

At the start of every five year election cycle voter registration takes place. The results for each province, including Kinshasa, are first used to proportionally distribute the 500 National Assembly seats and the 780 total seats of the provincial assemblies to the provinces. This determines the size of the provincial delegation in the National Assembly and the size of each provincial assembly. The second phase proportionally allocates provincial seats to each assembly district—in the case of the provincial assemblies, up to 10% of seats are reserved for the co-option of traditional leaders and are not allocated to an assembly district.

For the 2023 election, voter registration could not be carried out in some areas of the territories of Kwamouth, Masisi, and Rutshuru due to armed conflict. To deal with this, it was decided to postpone the elections in these territories, to reserve the same number of seats for these districts as they had in 2018, and to proportionally distribute the remaining seats to the other districts. The result was that only 484 National Assembly seats and 700 provincial assembly seats were to be contested.

Lumumbaville elected its first National Assembly deputy and its first deputy to the Provincial Assembly of Sankuru. This was the only new legislative district of the 2024-2028 legislature.

In the case of a commune council election, the commune is the single multi-member electoral district with the number of members determined by the number of registered voters in the commune according to a fixed table.

==== Getting on the ballot ====
Each candidate for these elections are part of a three-person ticket which includes candidates for first and second substitute. It is not unusual for a candidate to run for both a national and provincial assembly seat in which case they can keep but one and a substitute takes the other.

A new rule requires participating political parties and alliances to contest at least 60% of the seats up for renewal in an election. So for example, each party/alliance had to register at least 290 candidates to participate in the National Assembly election.

==== Election method ====
The method by which members are elected are different in districts having more than one seat, the most common case, from those that end up with only one seat.

In multiple-member districts, members are elected by open list proportional representation, with seats assigned using the largest remainder method. Candidates who win more than half the vote in their district are automatically assigned a seat. Otherwise, a party or independent candidate must meet an election threshold to qualify for seat assignment. The election thresholds for the National Assembly, a provincial assembly, or a commune council are 1% of the vote nationally, 3% provincially, and 10% in the commune, respectively.

In single member districts, members are elected using first-past-the-post voting.

== Candidates ==
The 26 official presidential candidates were:

=== Active up to election day ===
- Tony Bolamba
- Jean-Claude Baende
- Martin Fayulu, leader of the Engagement for Citizenship and Development
- Marie-Josée Ifoku
- Moïse Katumbi, leader of the Together for the Republic
- Denis Mukwege, winner of the 2018 Nobel Peace Prize
- Adolphe Muzito, former prime minister (2008–2012)
- Enoch Ngila
- Théodore Ngoy
- Radjabho Tebabho Soborabo
- Félix Tshisekedi, incumbent president (2018–present) and leader of the Union for Democracy and Social Progress
- Constant Mutamba
- Justin Mudekereza
- Georges Buse Falay
- Rex Kazadi
- Abraham Ngalasi
- Nkema Liloo Bokonzi
- Floribert Anzuluni
- André Masalu

=== Withdrew in favor of another candidate ===
- Franck Diongo, withdrew in favor of Moïse Katumbi
- Seth Kikuni, withdrew in favor of Moïse Katumbi
- Matata Ponyo Mapon, former prime minister (2012–2016) withdrew in favor of Moïse Katumbi
- Delly Sesanga, withdrew in favor of Moïse Katumbi
- Joëlle Bilé, withdrew in favor of Félix Tshisekedi
- Patrice Mwamba, withdrew in favor of Félix Tshisekedi
- Noël Tshiani, withdrew in favor of Félix Tshisekedi

== Opinion polls ==
Opinion polling is rare in the Democratic Republic of the Congo due to poor roads and lack of electricity. Nevertheless, a survey conducted by GeoPoll Socio-Political Barometer in the second quarter of 2023 found that voters expressed significant discontent with the governance under Tshisekedi, assigning him a satisfaction rating of 49.7%. Despite this, the survey also suggested that Tshisekedi would secure a second term thanks in part to perceived improvements, such as his free education initiative, and partly due to a divided opposition.

An earlier 2022 poll by the same group found unemployment and insecurity to be the most cited dysfunctional areas, closely followed by the state of the country's roads and rising prices. On the other hand, free education was found to be the most favorable policy.

== Conduct ==
=== Pre-election violence ===
While the lead-up to the election was generally calm, several violent incidents were reported. On 14 July 2023, Chérubin Okende Senga, spokesperson for ENSEMBLE and former transport minister, was fatally shot in Kinshasa. The murder, described by Katumbi as a "political assassination," led to legal action by Senga's relatives in Brussels, accusing the head of the DRC's military intelligence of involvement. Later in the year, a Katumbi rally in Moanda was broken up by live rounds, injuring several people. The provincial government blamed Katumbi's guards, stating that they fired warning shots after the crowd grew rowdy. Katumbi blamed the police.

Violent clashes between supporters of different parties were also observed across various provinces, with candidates facing death threats on the campaign trail. On 4 November, suspected UDPS activists attacked the convoy of Martin Fayulu in Tshikapa, Kasai province. On 7 November, UDPS supporters clashed with ENSEMBLE supporters at a rally in Kasumbalesa, followed by ransacking of the local UDPS headquarters by Ensemble supporters.

On 28 November, during Katumbi's march in Kindu, UDPS supporters threw stones at Dido Kakisingi, leader of ENSEMBLE's Maniema youth league, to then be run over and killed by a truck belonging to the campaign team of Maniema Governor Afani Idrissa Mangala. After his killing, more UDPS supporters were seen throwing stones, and gunshots were recorded, presumably from the Congolese National Police. Two people were sentenced to five years in jail in relation to the killing of Kakisingi.

At least 19 deaths, including two candidates, have been attributed to election-related violence.

=== Election preparations ===
CENI was reportedly woefully underprepared for the election. Due to the state of the country's roads compared to its size and the lack of funding, CENI was forced to resort to doing almost everything via plane. As transporting by air is costly, CENI had to get Egypt to send two C-130 Hercules planes to help deliver ballot papers at the last moment. Additionally, CENI begged the UN to use its aircraft.

=== Election day ===
On election day voting offices were scheduled to open at 6 AM, but delays were observed nationwide, resulting in the formation of exceptionally long lines. Various logistical issues further compounded the situation, including the late arrival of materials, malfunctioning voting machines, failed batteries intended to sustain their operation, and instances of lost ballot papers. This prolonged waiting period reportedly led to frustration among poorly informed and/or impatient individuals, resulting in attacks on poll workers and polling stations. Additionally, 11,000 voting stations didn't even vote at all or were not counted.

According to Schadrack Mukad, an adjunct executive national secretary of the Civil Society Organization for Peace in Congo, which deployed 75,000 observers during the vote, "there were cases of machines that were seized by certain candidates and others by certain agents of CENI outside voting places.” He expressed concern about the involvement of certain politico-administrative authorities and electoral candidates, who he says diverted CENI agents away from polling stations for a significant duration. Mukad attributed these violations to members affiliated with Tshisekedi's coalition.

Controversially, the election necessitated an extension into a second day, a move which was declared illegal by local observers and civil society, and parts of the country were still casting ballots five days after election day.

CENI recognised cases of fraud, vandalism and intimidation, as well as the use of illegal voting machines.

=== Analysis ===
According to Nicolas Niarchos, in his piece for The New York Review of Books, CENI's polling station data, "although impressive in detail", showed "strange" results. In the Fayulu stronghold of Kinshasa, for example, only 1,756,303 votes were counted–just ten percent of the capital's population.

Tafi Mhaka, in an opinion piece for Aljazeera, described the elections as "shambolic," calling for the Southern African Development Community to uphold electoral standards in every single member country.

Alternatively, Albert Kasanda, in his piece for The Conversation, partially attributes the opposition's failure to unite behind a single candidate and their campaign strategies, compared to Tshisekedi, who had the backing of major political figures which provided him a broad territorial network and a foothold in various regions of the country.

== Results ==
=== President ===
Candidate	Party	Votes	%
Félix Tshisekedi	Union for Democracy and Social Progress	13,058,962	73.47
Moïse Katumbi	Together for the Republic	3,256,572	18.32
Martin Fayulu	Commitment to Citizenship and Development	875,336	4.92
Adolphe Muzito	New Momentum	200,800	1.13
Soborabo Radjabho Tebabho	Congolese United for Change	70,099	0.39
Denis Mukwege	Independent	39,639	0.22
Aggrey Ngalasi Kurisini	Independent	37,201	0.21
Constant Mutamba	Revolutionary Progressive Dynamic	36,197	0.20
Jean-Claude Baende	Independent	25,584	0.14
Delly Sesanga	Flight	17,785	0.10
Loli Nkema Liloo Bokonzi	Independent	17,046	0.10
Patrice Majondo Mwamba	Independent	15,793	0.09
Marie-Josée Ifoku	Independent	15,266	0.09
Matata Ponyo Mapon	Leadership and Governance for Development	14,181	0.08
André Masalu Anedu	Independent	13,974	0.08
Floribert Anzuluni	Independent	13,707	0.08
Noël Tshiani	Independent	9,276	0.05
Seth Kikuni	Independent	8,621	0.05
Justin Mudekereza Bisimwa	Independent	7,573	0.04
Joëlle Bilé Batali	Independent	6,911	0.04
Franck Diongo	Progressive Lumumbist Movement	6,780	0.04
Tony Bolamba	Independent	6,307	0.04
Rex Kazadi Kanda	Independent	5,757	0.03
Georges Buse Falay	Independent	5,288	0.03
Enoch Ngila	Independent	5,156	0.03
Théodore Ngoy	Independent	4,132	0.02
Total		17,773,943	100.00
Valid votes		17,773,943	99.85
Invalid/blank votes		26,252	0.15
Total votes		17,800,195	100.00
Registered voters/turnout		41,738,628	42.65
Source: CENI as amended by the Constitutional Court

=== National Assembly ===
Map displaying seats won by party/alliance

Prominent opposition figure Kabila's People's Party for Reconstruction and Democracy and his coalition, the Common Front for Congo (FFC), just like with the presidential election, did not partake in the electoral process, citing unmet demands such as representation of the FCC within CENI, an independent, balanced constitutional court, a consensual electoral law that guarantees greater transparency, security for opposition members, and the restoration of security in the eastern part of the DRC as well as in the province of Mai-Ndombe. Another prominent opposition figure, Fayulu, blocked his party from participating in the parliamentary election.

The provisional results, initially due on 3 January 2024, were delayed by 10 days due to reported fraud and irregularities denounced by CENI. Later, on 4 February 2024, the CENI published the remaining provisional results of the elections for national and provincial deputies in the electoral districts of Budjala, Bomongo, Ilebo, Kikwit, Kole, Makanza and Mobayi-Mbongo. According to the provisional results, 44 parties and/or political groupings had met the threshold for representation in the National Assembly. The results came from 177 constituencies, excluding Masimanimba in Kwilu and Yakoma in Nord-Ubangi as they were annulled for fraud, and the territories of Masisi and Rutshuru in North Kivu and Kwamouth in Maï-Ndombe, where elections were not held due to the activism of armed groups. Additionally, 82 candidates for the national, provincial and local legislative election had their candidacy invalidated for electoral fraud and other illicit acts.

While Tshisekedi's party, the UDPS, only won 69 of the seats, his governing coalition, the Sacred Union of the Nation (USN), won nearly 450, more than 90% of the seats in the National Assembly.

Matata Ponyo Mapon, Constant Mutamba, Jean-Claude Baende and Adolphe Muzito, who also stood in the presidential election, were elected in Kindu, Lubao, Mbandaka and Kikwit respectively, while a large number of the president's allies, including the two presidents of the houses of parliament: Christophe Mboso and Bahati Lukuebo, Prime Minister Sama Lukonde, and the candidate deputy prime ministers Vital Kamerhe, Jean-Pierre Lihau and Christophe Lutundula, won their seats once again.

Provisional results
Party or alliance		Votes	%	Seats	+/–
Sacred Union of the Nation	Union for Democracy and Social Progress	1,664,049	9.26	69	+37
Sacred Union of the Nation	Allied Actions–Union for the Congolese Nation	903,928	5.03	34	+18
Sacred Union of the Nation	Alliance of Democratic Forces of Congo	890,753	4.96	35	–6
Sacred Union of the Nation	Agissons and Buildings	752,559	4.19	26	–
Sacred Union of the Nation	Allied Actions–All for the Development of Congo	692,491	3.85	21	–
Sacred Union of the Nation	Alliance of actors attached to the people	649,226	3.61	21	–
Sacred Union of the Nation	Alliance bloc 50	546,079	3.04	20	–
Sacred Union of the Nation	Alliance for the Advent of a Prosperous and Greater Congo	532,066	2.96	16	–
Sacred Union of the Nation	Movement for the Liberation of the Congo	471,375	2.62	19	–3
Sacred Union of the Nation	Alliance 2024	443,859	2.47	15	–
Sacred Union of the Nation	Coalition of Democrats	431,028	2.40	9	–
Sacred Union of the Nation	Alternative Action of Actors for the Love of Congo	392,140	2.18	16	–
Sacred Union of the Nation	Congo Allied Action for the Convention	390,161	2.17	10	–
Sacred Union of the Nation	It's up to us to build the Congo	379,135	2.11	13	–
Sacred Union of the Nation	Alliance for Democratic Alternation and Allies	336,813	1.87	8	–
Sacred Union of the Nation	Alliance for Values	330,813	1.84	7	–
Sacred Union of the Nation	Actions of the Allies of the Convention for the Republic and Democracy	320,370	1.78	9	–
Sacred Union of the Nation	Alliance for the Triple and Allies	305,728	1.70	7	–
Sacred Union of the Nation	Alliance for the Solidarity Movement for Change	291,226	1.62	6	–
Sacred Union of the Nation	Alliances of Unified and Allied Tshisekedists	287,996	1.60	6	–
Sacred Union of the Nation	Allied Action for the Rise of the Congo	284,205	1.58	7	–
Sacred Union of the Nation	Alliance of Nationalists	277,460	1.54	7	–
Sacred Union of the Nation	Alliance of Progressive Congolese and Allies	260,392	1.45	9	–
Sacred Union of the Nation	Alliance and Action for the Rule of Law	258,255	1.44	4	–
Sacred Union of the Nation	Action for National Unity	239,969	1.33	8	–
Sacred Union of the Nation	Alliance 2025	232,648	1.29	3	–
Sacred Union of the Nation	Alliance for the Growth and Democracy of Congo	221,869	1.23	1	–
Sacred Union of the Nation	Actions of Convention Allies–Unified Lumumbist Party	215,877	1.20	8	–9
Sacred Union of the Nation	Political and Social Forces Allied to the UDPS	206,721	1.15	4	–
Sacred Union of the Nation	Alternative Vital Kamerhe 2018	200,899	1.12	3	–
Sacred Union of the Nation	Audible Actions for Good Governance	191,056	1.06	8	–
Sacred Union of the Nation	Alliance for Development Actions in Congo	191,053	1.06	1	–
Sacred Union of the Nation	Christian Alternative for Congo	190,606	1.06	4	–
Sacred Union of the Nation	Another Vision of Congo and Allies	187,358	1.04	5	–
Sacred Union of the Nation	UDPS/KIBASSA–A	180,054	1.00	2	+2
Sacred Union of the Nation	Alliance of Political Parties Allied to the Movement for the Liberation of the Congo	179,929	1.00	2	–
Sacred Union of the Nation	Alliance for the Reform of the Republic	179,877	1.00	2	–
Sacred Union of the Nation	Allied Action for the Love of the Republic/Convention for the Republic	179,851	1.00	0	–
Sacred Union of the Nation	Action for the Federative Cause	179,847	1.00	2	–
Sacred Union of the Nation	Rally of Tshisekediast Democrats	105,046	0.58	0	–
Sacred Union of the Nation	Action for the Breakthrough and Development and Allies	104,876	0.58	0	–
Sacred Union of the Nation	Alliance of Christian Democrats of Congo	99,748	0.55	0	–
Sacred Union of the Nation	Alliance of Democrats for the Emergence of Congo and Allies	33,163	0.18	0	–
Sacred Union of the Nation	New Conscious Generation	12,862	0.07	0	–
Sacred Union of the Nation	Total	15,425,416	85.81	447	New
Together for the Republic		497,009	2.76	18	New
Avançons–MS		202,750	1.13	5	+4
Alliance of Elites in the Service of the People and Allies		179,953	1.00	0	–
New Momentum		179,870	1.00	3	–
Dynamique Progressive Revolutionnaire		179,834	1.00	3	–
Alternation		138,175	0.77	0	–
Action of the Allies		114,970	0.64	0	–
The Progressives		110,461	0.61	0	–
Action of the Allies Acquired to Democracy		104,841	0.58	0	–
Alliance of Democrats for Renewal and Progress		101,786	0.57	0	–
Leadership and Governance for Development		75,944	0.42	1	–
Lumbist Social Movement		66,536	0.37	0	–
Action of the Nationalist Allies for Democracy		66,106	0.37	0	–
Actions of the Allies for Democracy and Development		61,046	0.34	0	–
Let's Act 7		50,943	0.28	0	–
Popular Awakening		49,105	0.27	0	–
Action for Reconstruction and Work and Allies		47,842	0.27	0	–
Alliance for the Development and Integrity of the Homeland		41,731	0.23	0	–
New Political Order on the Horizon 2023 in the Democratic Republic of Congo		37,416	0.21	0	–
Alliance of Reformers for a New Leadership		36,090	0.20	0	–
Patriotic Front 2023		33,383	0.19	0	–
Alliance of the Congolese for the Refoundation of the Nation		32,866	0.18	0	–
Party of the Flight of the DR.Congo		29,129	0.16	0	–
Mbonda		24,692	0.14	0	–
Citizen Alternative		13,763	0.08	0	–
Congolese United for Change		10,004	0.06	0	–
Love of the Neighbor and the Part of Congo		5,471	0.03	0	–
Independents		59,419	0.33	0	–
Annulled seats				7	+7
No election				16	+16
Total		17,976,551	100.00	500	–23
Valid votes		17,976,551	95.55		
Invalid votes		748,079	3.98		
Blank votes		88,839	0.47		
Total votes		18,813,469	100.00		
Registered voters/turnout		41,738,628	45.07		
Source: CENI USN members opposition members

=== Provincial assemblies ===
Combined provisional results
Party Abbreviation	Votes	%	Seats	+/–
UDPS/TSHISEKEDI			102	59
AFDC-A			66	–2
A/A-UNC			48	–
2A/TDC			39	–
AB			34	–
AACPG			30	–
MLC			29	6
ANB			26	–
ENSEMBLE			23	–
4AC			21	–
A/B50			18	–
A24			17	–
CDER			17	–
AAAP			16	–
ACP-A			14	–
AAD-A			10	–
AEDC-A			10	–
AAeC			10	–
AAC/PALU			9	–
A3A			8	–
APA/MLC			8	–
ARDEV-A			8	–
A25			7	–
AV			7	–
AA/C			7	–
FPAU			7	–
A/VK2018			6	–
AN			6	–
A2R			6	–
AVC-A			6	–
ATUA			5	–
APCF			5	–
A1			5	–
AACRD			4	–
ALTERNANCE			4	–
AAAD			4	–
AMSC			3	–
A7			3	–
1A/A			3	–
CRP			3	–
NOU.EL			3	–
AE			2	–
AABG			2	–
AUN			2	–
AADC-A			2	–
ALDEC			2	–
AVANCONS-MS			2	–
CODE			2	–
AAAVC			2	–
MSL			2	–
DTC			2	–
ADCN			2	–
ASOD			2	–
AESPA			1	–
AAAR/CRD			1	–
LP			1	–
DYPRO			1	–
ART&A			1	–
LGD			1	–
ACSCO			1	–
Other parties and independents			0	
Annulled			12	
Total			700	–15
Valid votes	17,960,910	99.53		
Invalid/blank votes	84,438	0.47		
Total votes	18,045,348	100.00		
Registered voters/turnout	41,738,628	43.23		
Source: CENI

==== Composition of provincial assemblies ====
Province	Elected seats												
Province	Total	V	Party										
Bas-Uele	17		AAeC	UDPS/T.	A1	MLC	2A/TDC	AB	AFDC-A	ANB	ENSEM.		
Bas-Uele	17		5	3	2	2	1	1	1	1	1		
Equateur	19		FPAU	AFDC-A	CDER	AB	APA/MLC	MLC	AAAP	DYPRO	UDPS/T.		
Equateur	19		4	3	3	2	2	2	1	1	1		
Haut-Katanga	44		ENSEM.	UDPS/T.	2A/TDC	ARDEV-A	AB	1A/A					
Haut-Katanga	44		11	10	8	8	4	3					
Haut-Lomami	24		AB	AFDC-A	ANB	ENSEM.	UDPS/T.	AAAP	ALDEC	AUN	ALTER.	AMSC	
Haut-Lomami	24		4	3	3	3	3	2	2	2	1	1	
Haut-Uele	18		A/A-UNC	A1	A24	UDPS/T.	2A/TDC	A/VK2018	A/B50				
Haut-Uele	18		4	3	3	3	2	2	1				
Ituri	43		A/B50	AACPG	A/A-UNC	AFDC-A	4AC	A2R	MLC	UDPS/T.	AAeC	MSL	
Ituri	43		7	6	5	5	4	4	4	4	2	2	
Kasai	30		UDPS/T.	A/A-UNC	AFDC-A	2A/TDC	AACPG	A2R	A3A	APCF	DTC	ACSCO	
Kasai	30		6	5	4	3	3	2	2	2	2	1	
Kasai Central	31		UDPS/T.	A3A	2A/TDC	AFDC-A	A/A-UNC	AACPG	APCF	ATUA			
Kasai Central	31		6	5	4	4	3	3	3	3			
Kasai Oriental	22		UDPS/T.	4AC	A24	AFDC-A	AADC-A	AV	2A/TDC				
Kasai Oriental	22		8	3	3	3	2	2	1				
Kinshasa	44		UDPS/T.	ACP-A	4AC	AFDC-A	MLC	ANB	AACPG				
Kinshasa	44		14	9	6	6	6	2	1				
Kongo Central	36		A/A-UNC	AVC-A	UDPS/T.	AFDC-A	CDER	AB	AV	AAAP			
Kongo Central	36		8	6	6	4	4	3	3	2			
Kwango	22		AAC/PALU	AACRD	AB	UDPS/T.	4AC	AAD-A	AFDC-A	A25	AAAR/CRD	AEDC-A	CDER
Kwango	22		3	3	3	3	2	2	2	1	1	1	1
Kwilu	43	8	AACPG	AAC/PALU	AA/C	ANB	AFDC-A	2A/TDC	NOU.EL	AV			
Kwilu	43	8	7	6	5	5	4	3	3	2			
Lomami	25		2A/TDC	AACPG	4AC	AFDC-A	UDPS/T.	A24	ACP-A	ATUA	A3A	AMSC	
Lomami	25		4	4	3	3	3	2	2	2	1	1	
Lualaba	22		A24	A25	ENSEM.	A/A-UNC	ALTER.	UDPS/T.	AN	ART&A	AVAN.-MS		
Lualaba	22		4	4	4	3	2	2	1	1	1		
Mai-Ndombe	17	2	AAAP	AAeC	ACP-A	2A/TDC	ADCN	AFDC-A	UDPS/T.				
Mai-Ndombe	17	2	5	3	3	1	1	1	1				
Maniema	20		AACPG	A24	UDPS/T.	A/A-UNC	ENSEM.	A25	AAAP	AACRD	AB	LGD	
Maniema	20		5	3	3	2	2	1	1	1	1	1	
Mongala	18		MLC	UDPS/T.	FPAU	A/A-UNC	AA/C	A24	A25	CDER			
Mongala	18		4	4	3	2	2	1	1	1			
Nord-Kivu	44	14	A/B50	AAD-A	AB	CRP	UDPS/T.	A/A-UNC	AAAVC	AEDC-A	CODE	AMSC	
Nord-Kivu	44	14	7	5	3	3	3	2	2	2	2	1	
Nord-Ubangi	17	4	2A/TDC	AFDC-A	CDER	MLC	A/A-UNC	ADCN	AESPA	ASOD	UDPS/T.		
Nord-Ubangi	17	4	2	2	2	2	1	1	1	1	1		
Sankuru	23		2A/TDC	UDPS/T.	AB	ANB	A/A-UNC	AAAP	AE	A/VK2018	AAD-A	AFDC-A	
Sankuru	23		4	4	3	3	2	2	2	1	1	1	
Sud-Kivu	44		A/A-UNC	AFDC-A	UDPS/T.	2A/TDC	AEDC-A	AN	A/B50	A/VK2018	AAAP		
Sud-Kivu	44		8	8	7	4	4	4	3	3	3		
Sud-Ubangi	26		CDER	AFDC-A	APA/MLC	ANB	LP	MLC	AB	UDPS/T.	ASOD	AACPG	
Sud-Ubangi	26		6	2	4	4	1	4	2	1	1	1	
Tanganyika	23		AFDC-A	4AC	AB	2A/TDC	AABG	ANB	ENSEM.	UDPS/T.	ALTER.	AVAN.-MS	
Tanganyika	23		5	3	3	2	2	2	2	2	1	1	
Tshopo	27		AFDC-A	AAAD	ANB	MLC	A/A-UNC	AEDC-A	UDPS/T.	A7			
Tshopo	27		5	4	4	4	3	3	3	1			
Tshuapa	17		AB	A7	AAD-A	ANB	APA/MLC	A24	AN	MLC	UDPS/T.		
Tshuapa	17		5	2	2	2	2	1	1	1	1		
Total	716	28											
Source: CENI													

== Aftermath ==
On 6 January 2024, Katumbi released a statement disputing the results of the election on the grounds of "massive fraud and treachery" and calling for the resignation of Denis Kadima, the head of the Independent National Electoral Commission. Two days later, his party stated that he had been placed under house arrest, with a spokesman reporting the presence of "heavily armed soldiers traveling in armoured vehicles surrounding his house". The security forces were subsequently ordered to withdraw by the provincial governor Jacques Kyabula Katwe.
