= Commission électorale indépendante =

Commission électorale indépendante may refer to:

- Commission électorale indépendante (Democratic Republic of the Congo) or Independent Electoral Commission, former name of the Independent National Electoral Commission
- Commission électorale indépendante (Ivory Coast) or Independent Electoral Commission
