= Anzuluni =

Anzuluni is a Congolese surname. Notable people with the surname include:

- Floribert Anzuluni (born 1983), Congolese politician and activist
- Yannick Anzuluni (born 1988), Congolese-Canadian basketball player
