= Engagement for Citizenship and Development =

Opposition party in the Democratic Republic of the Congo

Engagement for Citizenship and Development Engagement pour la citoyenneté et le développement
- President: Martin Fayulu
- General Secretary: Devos Kitoko Mulenda
- First Vice President: Jean-Baptiste Kasekwa Muhindo
- Founder: Martin Fayulu
- Founded: 9 March 2009
- Headquarters: Kinshasa
- Ideology: Social Liberalism
- National affiliation: Lamuka
- Seats in the National Assembly: 0 / 484
- Seats in the Senate: 0 / 109

Engagement for Citizenship and Development (French: Engagement pour la Citoyenneté et le Développement, ECIDE) is a political party in the Democratic Republic of the Congo. The party was founded in 2009 and is led by its founder Martin Fayulu.

== History ==
=== Founding ===
The party was formed in 2009 by businessman and oil executive Martin Fayulu, who had been elected as Member of the National Assembly in 2006. The party won two seats in the National Assembly in the 2011 Democratic Republic of the Congo general election.

=== 2018 elections ===
In 2018, the party was one of the founding members of the Lamuka coalition, that promised to unite the opposition in advance of the 2018 Democratic Republic of the Congo general election. Infighting lead to multiple opposition leaders, including Félix Tshisekedi, leaving the coalition. The party ran under the label Dynamic of the Opposition in the 2018 election. According to officially published results, its leader Martin Fayulu finished second in the presidential elections behind Félix Tshisekedi. Independent observers, including the Episcopal Conference of the Democratic Republic of the Congo claim that Fayulu won the elections. Fayulu proclaimed himself victor of the presidential elections and called on his supporters to protest against the official results.

Candidates running under the "Dynamic of the Opposition" label won eight out of the 500 seats in the National Assembly.

=== After the 2018 elections ===
Supporters and office holders of ECIDE were targeted by supporters of the government after the 2018 election and in the run-up of the 2023 Democratic Republic of the Congo general election. The party called for a boycott of the elections at first, but later presented Martin Fayulu as its presidential candidate, but didn't run any candidates in the parliamentary election. After the election Fayulu and other opposition leaders called for protests against the election results and alleged fraud. Protests by ECIDE supporters were suppressed by the police.

In a 2024 extraordinary conference, former Member of the National Assembly Jean-Baptiste Kasekwa Muhindo was elected first vice-president of the party.

During the second term of president Félix Tshisekedi, the party allied with supporters of former president Joseph Kabila to fight against government plans to amend the Constitution of the Democratic Republic of the Congo.

== Election performance ==
=== Presidential Elections ===
Year	Candidate	Votes	%	Rank	Outcome
2018	Martin Fayulu	6,366,732	34.82%	2nd	Lost
2023	Martin Fayulu	875,336	4.92%	3rd ▼	Lost

=== National Assembly ===
Year	Leader	Seats	+/−	Votes	%	Outcome
2011	Martin Fayulu	2 / 500	▲2	[data missing]	[data missing]	Opposition
2018	Martin Fayulu	8 / 500	▲6	[data missing]	[data missing]	Opposition
2023	Martin Fayulu	0 / 484	▼8	Didn't participate		Extra-Parliamentary
