= 2005 Democratic Republic of the Congo constitutional referendum =

- 18—19 December 2005

Results
Choice	Votes	%
Yes	12,461,001	84.31%
No	2,319,074	15.69%
Valid votes	14,780,075	95.32%
Invalid or blank votes	725,735	4.68%
Total votes	15,505,810	100.00%
Registered voters/turnout	25,021,703	61.97%
- Results by province and turnout

A constitutional referendum was held in the Democratic Republic of Congo on 18 and 19 December 2005. Voters were asked whether they approved of a proposed new constitution. It was approved by 84% of voters, with the first elections held under the new constitution in 2006.

== Background ==
Whilist low-level insurgencies would rage on in the east (Kivu conflict, Ituri conflict, ADF insurgency, LRA insurgency, Katanga insurgency), the Second Congo War gradually came to an end following the signing the Sun City Agreement in April 2002, which created a two-year transitional government led by President Joseph Kabila, with government positions given to the various rebel groups. The agreement also provided set elections for 30 June 2005, independence day, to end the transition period, which would be the first election in over forty years.

By the end of 2004, the planned elections stopped being an abstraction, gaining creditability among the population and politicians, who "began to factor them into their calculations."

In January 2005, however, doubts emerged about whether elections could be held on schedule, with CENI President Apollinaire Malu Malu stating that the elections would probably have to be postponed, citing deliberate delays by transitional politicians who benefited from the status quo and were reluctant to see it end. With the new pro-election sentiment among the populace, anti-postponement riots broke out in Kinshassa and other cities throughout the country, resulting in four deaths in the capital. These riots were blamed on the UDPS, which had boycotted the transition. The UDPS, in turn, claimed that they were popular exasperation with artificial delays in the process, a view shared by the International Committee for Support to the Transition (CIAT).

Only in March did the National Assembly begin to debate a draft constitution, which was revised on 13 May after the EU, the largest donor in the country, criticised it for granting too much power to the president. The final version created a semi-presidential system with substantial autonomy for 26 new provinces. On 16 May, Kabila presented the constitution, which was scheduled to be voted on in a national referendum at the end of the year. While stating that the elections were inevitable, he confirmed the likelihood of delays. Agreeing with Malu Malu's argument, new anti-postponement riots broke out, killing two and wounding twelve. On 17 June, the National Assembly and Senate voted to extend the transitional period to allow more time to prepare for the elections.

These riots quickly spread across the country, killing over 30 people in the last week of June. The UDPS had joined in on this, pushing for mass protests against the postponement while also calling for a boycott of the voter registration process, partly due to the rumoured attempts to bring the UDPS into government leading to nowhere. Former rebel leader and Vice President Jean-Pierre Bemba declared on his private radio station that he was ready to kill those responsible for electoral sabotage. Laurent Monsengwo Pasinya, Archbishop of Kinshasa, called to register without rioting, slowly calming the situation down.

Despite UDPS leader Étienne Tshisekedi's calls for a boycott, the voter registration campaign was largely successful outside his home region of Kasaï. By the eve of the election, more than 25 million of an estimated 28 million electorate had registered. Tshisekedi continued to call for an election boycott.

== Proposed constitution ==
The new constitution introduced a two-term limit on the presidency and a minimum age of 30 for presidential candidates (reduced from 35), allowing the incumbent President Joseph Kabila to run for office. It also granted citizenship to all ethnic groups present in the country at the time of independence in 1960 and increased the number of provinces from 10 to 26, as well as guaranteeing free primary education.

== Conduct ==
The referendum was originally scheduled to be held on 17 December, but ran into a second day due to issues with heavy rain and incomplete voter rolls. Observers from the European Union said the poll was "largely free and fair" and that the atmosphere at the time of the referendum was peaceful.

== Results ==
About 62% of registered voters participated in the constitutional referendum, with the lowest turnouts occurring in the UDPS strongholds of Kinshasa, Kasaï Occidental, and Kasaï Oriental. According to Gérard Prunier, the referendum foreshadowed the 2006 presidential electoral map, with the results being 50–50 in Kinshassa and over 90% support being given in Katanga and the east where Kabila was seen as the best way to keep Rwanda out.

Choice	Votes	%
For	12,461,001	84.31
Against	2,319,074	15.69
Invalid/blank votes	725,735	–
Total	15,505,810	100
Registered voters/turnout	25,021,703	61.97
Source: African Elections Database
