= Floribert Anzuluni =

Congolese politician and activist

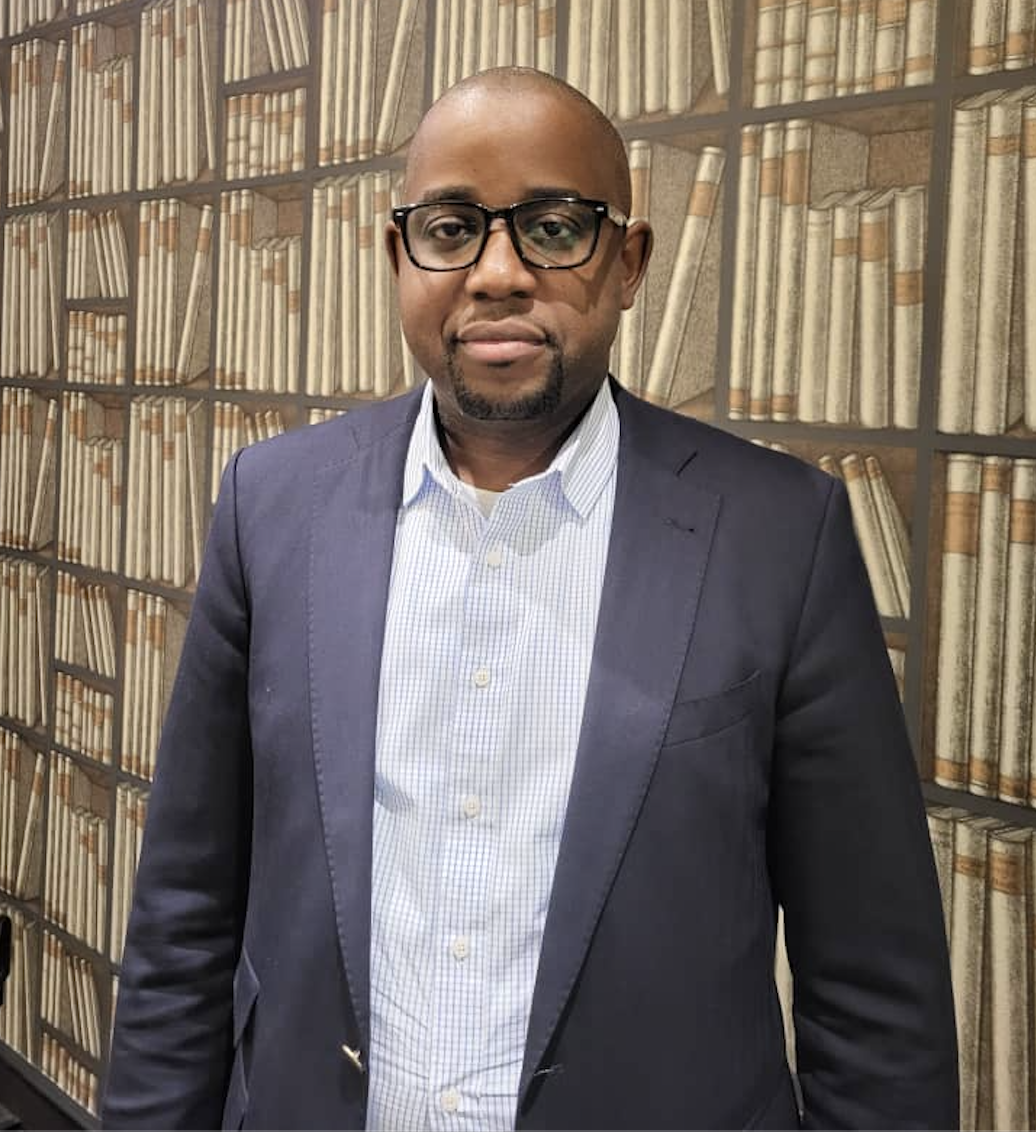

President of Filimbi
- In office April 2015 – December 2022

Personal details
- Born: Floribert Anzuluni Isiloketshi; January 5, 1983 (age 43) Kinshasa, Zaire (now Democratic Republic of the Congo)
- Relations: Celestin Anzuluni Bembe Isolonyonyi (father)

Floribert Anzuluni Isiloketshi is a Congolese politician and activist, and the president of the Alternative Citoyenne party. He unsuccessfully ran for president during the 2023 Democratic Republic of the Congo general election.

== Biography ==
Anzuluni was born on January 5, 1983, in Kinshasa, Zaire. His father, Celestin Anzuluni Bembe Isolonyonyi, was the president of the National Assembly of Zaire between 1988 and 1992, and is originally from South Kivu. Anzuluni completed secondary school in the Belgian town of Mons, and received a degree in political science from the Université de Montréal in Canada. After obtaining his diploma, he returned to Kinshasa.

In the DRC, Anzuluni worked in the South African Standard Bank and Ecobank as risk director. He co-founded the citizen movement Filimbi in 2015, with the objective of encouraging young Congolese to be more active politically and foster dialogue between activists and politicians. He led the movement until December 2022, and between 2015 and 2019, Anzuluni and other Filimbi leaders were forced into exile and repressed.

On September 11, 2023, Anzuluni became president of the Alternative Citoyenne party. He was elected as the party's presidential candidate in an October 5 primary organized by the Alternative for a New Congo (ACN) coalition over Joelle Bile Batali. His campaign ran on an anti-corruption platform, security, and improving the DRC's economic situation. In the election he received 13, 707 votes, equaling .08% of the vote. Anzuluni, Moise Katumbi, and Martin Fayulu all decried the results of the election and stated that there was corruption within the polling systems.
