= Justin Bisimwa Mudekereza =

Congolese activist

Dr. Justin Mudekereza
- Born: Justin Bisimwa Mudekereza; January 4, 1976; Kabare, DR.Congo
- Occupations: Philanthropist, Human rights activist, and Politician.
- Years active: 2006- present
- Organization: Rescue Democracy International-RDI
- Political party: MDVC Party
- Father: Victor Bisimwa Mudahindwa

Justin Bisimwa Mudekereza (born January 4, 1976), is a Congolese Philanthropist, human rights activist and politician. He is the founder of the Justin Mudekereza Foundation, a nonprofit dedicated to empowering and supporting vulnerable individuals in South Kivu. Justin serves as the Executive Director of New Neighbor Relief (NNR), a U.S.-based nonprofit assisting refugees and asylum seekers and as President & CEO of Rescue Democracy International (RDI), a 501(c)(3) nonprofit reducing suffering by promoting democracy. In 2023, Justin announced his candidacy for the Democratic Republic of Congo’s presidential election as a representative of the MDVC party. Later he formed the Patriotic Bloc for Peace and National Unity (B-PUN) to advocate for post-election stability.

== Early life ==
Justin was born on January 4, 1976, in Mudaka, Kabare territory, South Kivu, DRC. Growing up in a large family with 44 children from his late father Chief Victor Bisimwa Mudahindwa.

== Career ==
Since 2010, Justin has held the position of Chief Executive Officer at Aspire for African Development & Consulting (ADEC LTD), a company dedicated to empowering development organizations, entrepreneurs, and public institutions.

In 2013, he worked as teacher at Namasuba College of Commerce in Uganda after what he was hire in the same position by PIDAM University in Somalia. In 2017, Justin worked as teacher in San Diego State University, in California.

While in the U.S., Justin serves as the Executive Director of New Neighbor Relief (NNR), a U.S.-based 501(c)3 nonprofit organization which he co-founded, assisting refugees and asylum seekers. Justin also holds the roles of president and Chief Executive Officer at Rescue Democracy International (RDI), a 501(c)3 nonprofit organization dedicated to reducing human suffering by promoting democratic processes. He has also authored books and academic articles addressing the challenges of refugee resettlement and social inequalities.

== Political career ==
In the 2006 DRC general election, Justin ran for a seat in the National Assembly, representing Kabare territory in South Kivu. Subsequently, he fled the DRC due to political persecution and sought asylum in the United States.

In 2023, Justin returned to the DRC and declared his candidacy for the 2023 presidential election. He represented the Mouvement d'Élites pour la Démocratie et le Vrai Changement (MDVC), a political party advocating for social justice, economic reform, and the reduction of excessive institutional expenditures.

Though he accepted the court's ruling, Justin condemned the elections as flawed, warning of political instability and external threats. In response, in January 2024, he announced the formation of the Patriotic Bloc for Peace and National Unity (B-PUN), a political platform to promote dialogue and peaceful resolution of the post-election crisis, urging national stakeholders to work together to maintain stability.

== Activism ==
In response to the February 2020 disturbances during Fally Ipupa's concert in Paris, Justin sent a letter to President Emmanuel Macron condemning the vandalism. He apologized on behalf of the Congolese diaspora and called for preventive measures to prevent such incidents in the future.

In April 2020, following the Mulongwe River flooding in Uvira, Justin opposed the Congolese government's plan to send a delegation from Kinshasa. He argued that sending aid directly to the provincial government would be more efficient, preventing unnecessary costs and the potential spread of COVID-19 to a region with few cases. Justin made this plea in an interview with Top Congo FM while residing in California.

In 2023, after winning a legal battle against the illegal “RAM” cellphone tax, Justin received the Nelson Mandela Leadership Award from the NRI Welfare Society.

== Publications ==
- Prof Justin B., Mudekereza (2019). Shithole Countries: an Independent & Development Based Analysis. Page Publishing, Inc. ISBN 9781642984743.
- Prof. Justin B., Mudekereza (2018). A Word of Warning to the World!. AuthorHouse. ISBN 9781546241102.
- Justin B., Mudekereza (2018). Understanding the multifaceted management problems of refugee resettlement in the United States of America: The only war that the United States is unlikely to win. Dorrance Publishing Company. ISBN 9781480957244.
- Mudekereza, Justin (2020). A Word of Warning to the World (Second ed.). Book Times LLC. ISBN 9781952309151.
