= Joëlle Bilé =

Congolese journalist, entrepreneur, and politician (born 1972)

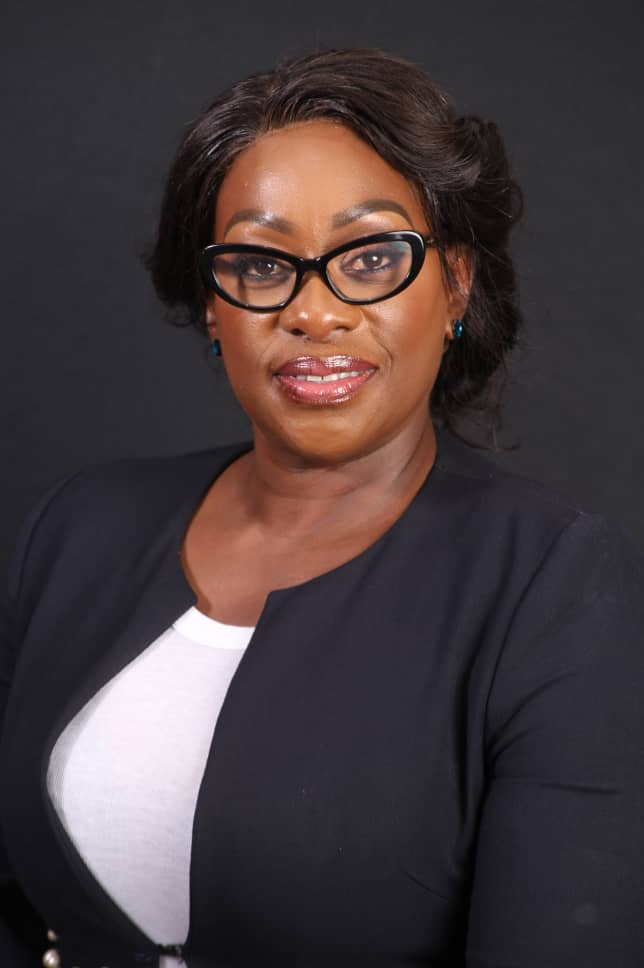
- Born: 25 June 1972 (age 54); Brussels, Belgium
- Education: University of Information and Communication Sciences
- Spouse: André Schetter (died 2019)

Joëlle Bilé Batali (born 25 June 1972), formerly Joëlle Bilé Schetter, is a Belgian-born Congolese journalist and entrepreneur who ran as a presidential candidate in the 2023 Democratic Republic of the Congo general election. She was born in Brussels, Belgium, and obtained her graduate degree from what is now UNISIC in Kinshasa. She worked in journalism for 15 years in the DRC, Belgium, and France. She competed for presidency during the 2023 election, but withdrew on 15 December 2023 and endorsed Félix Tshisekedi's campaign.

== Biography ==
Joëlle Bilé Batali was born on 25 June 1972 in Brussels, Belgium. She obtained her graduate degree from what is now the University of Information and Communication Sciences (UNISIC), a journalism school in Kinshasa, Democratic Republic of the Congo. She worked in journalism in the DRC, Belgium, and France for 15 years thereafter, working successively for Radio France Internationale, CFI TV, and TV5Monde. She became a manager of humanitarian communications at the World Food Programme in 2004.

Bilé worked in commercial communications for Airtel from 2005 to 2008. In 2008, she started her own company, the F4 Agency. She became a member of the Federation of Businesses of the Congo (FEC) in 2013.

=== 2023 presidential campaign ===
Bilé competed in the first round of Alternative for a New Congo (ACN) primaries for the 2023 presidential election. At the first round vote on held on 30 September 2023, she secured 35 out of 185 votes and placed second after Floribert Anzuluni. She was defeated by Anzuluni at the second round on 5 October after she secured only 37 of 151 votes.

She was among several candidates whose applications were rejected by the Independent National Electoral Commission (CENI). After a public hearing on appeals filed by the rejected candidate, she was reinstated as a candidate by the Constitutional Court on 30 October 2023. She filed her candidacy to CENI on 1 November. In November, she called for CENI to postpone the election by 30 days to improve the electoral process and hold consultations over concerns raised by candidates.

Her campaign platform promoted a governance program called "A Republic of Values" (French: Une République des valeurs). The program had eight points on national security, human capital, an improved education system, institutional and public administration reforms, and economic diversification.

Bilé withdrew from the race and endorsed Félix Tshisekedi's campaign on 15 December 2023, five days before the scheduled election.

== Personal life ==
She was married to Belgian businessman André Schetter, with whom she had four children. Schetter drowned on a hike along the Congo River in 2019. He was trying to save one of their daughters who had stumbled into the river. His body was recovered by the Belgian Embassy.
