= José Makila Sumanda =

Deputy Prime Minister Minister of Transport and Communications
- In office 19 December 2016 – 7 March 2019
- Preceded by: Justin Kalumba Mwana Ngongo
- Succeeded by: Azarias Ruberwa (interim); Didier Mazenga Mukanzu

Governor of Sud-Ubangi
- In office 1 April 2016 – 19 December 2016
- Preceded by: None

Governor of Équateur
- In office 27 January 2007 – January 2009
- Succeeded by: Jean-Claude Baende

Minister of Public Works and Infrastructure
- In office 2005–2006

Personal details
- Born: 20 September 1959 (age 66)
- Education: Laval University

José Makila Sumanda (born September 20, 1959) is a former Governor of Équateur Province in the Democratic Republic of the Congo. He was Minister of Public Works and Infrastructure from 2005 to 2006 and took office as Governor of Équateur on January 27, 2007, as a member of the Movement for the Liberation of Congo (MLC). He held the position until January 2009, after which he was succeeded by Jean-Claude Baende.

He was appointed one of three deputy prime ministers, with responsibility for transport and communication, in December 2016.
