= Tafi Mhaka =

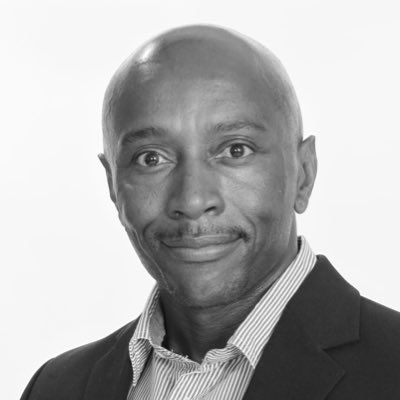
Tafi Mhaka

Tafi Mhaka is a Zimbabwean social and political commentator, and a writer. He graduated from the University of Cape Town and is a columnist at Al Jazeera. He has published work in Al Jazeera, News24, Nehanda Radio, Newsday, Middle East Eye, and New Zimbabwe, among others. His work focuses on politics and human rights across the African continent and African diaspora.
