= Pierre Honoré Kazadi Lukonda Ngube-Ngube =

Congolese economist and politician

Pierre Honoré Kazadi Lukonda Ngube-Ngube (born 28 July 1963, Lubumbashi, Katanga Province) is a Congolese economist and politician who is a former member of the Parliament of the Democratic Republic of the Congo. Previously he had been an economics professor at the universities of Kasaï and Katanga, and is also a Protestant chaplain. He was a presidential candidate for the Popular Front for Justice party (FPJ) in the 2018 Democratic Republic of the Congo general election.
