= Delly Sesanga =

Congolese politician

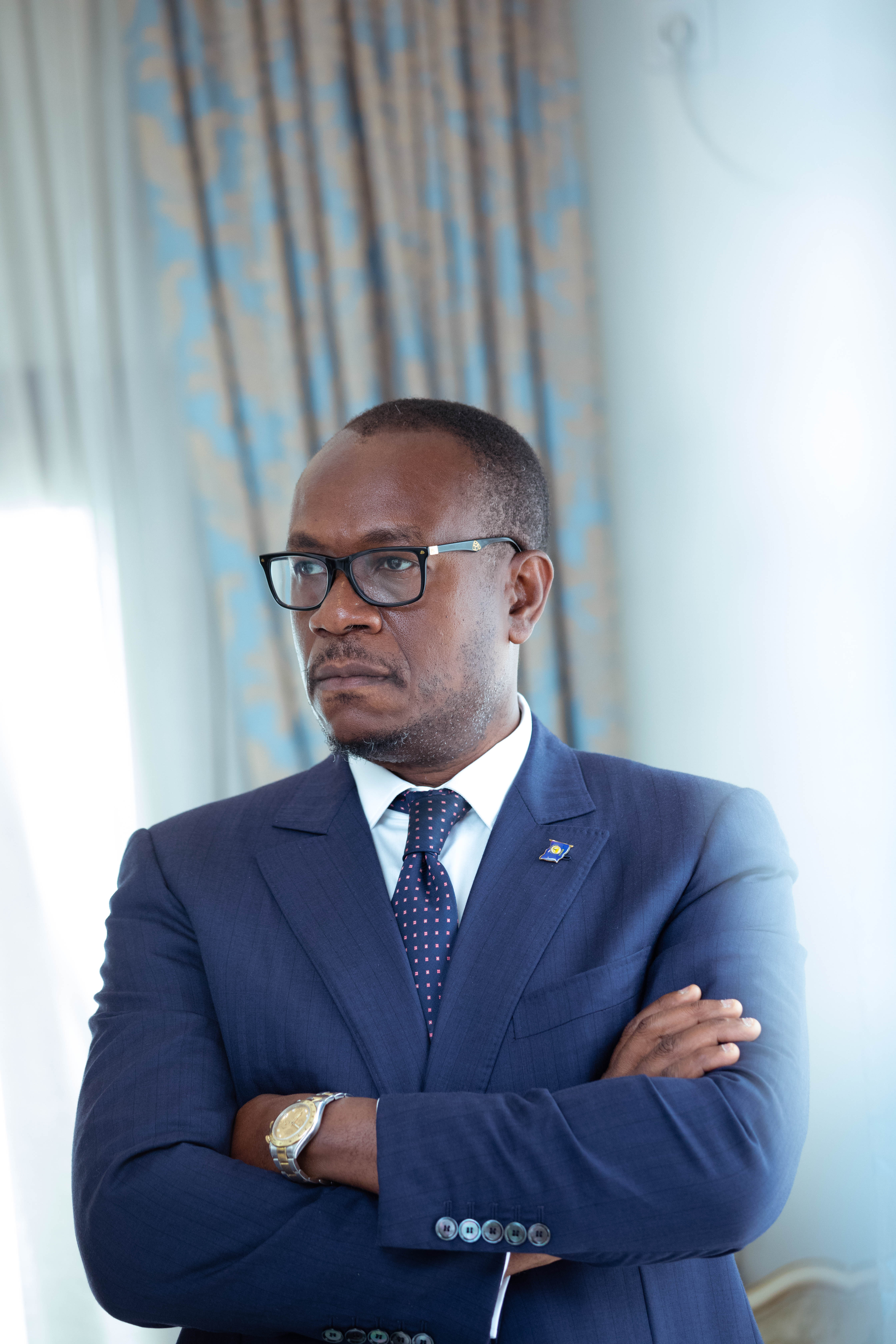

Deputy of the National Assembly
- Incumbent
- Assumed office July 30, 2006
- Constituency: Luiza Territory, Kasai-Central

President of L'Envoi de le RDC
- Incumbent
- Assumed office July 9, 2021
- Preceded by: Position established

Minister of Planning
- In office March 24, 2006 – October 10, 2006
- President: Joseph Kabila
- Vice President: Jean-Pierre Bemba; Azarias Ruberwa; Arthur Z'ahidi Ngoma; Abdoulaye Yerodia Ndombasi
- Preceded by: Alexis Thambwe Mwamba
- Succeeded by: Olivier Kamitatu Etsu

Personal details
- Born: Delly Sesanga Hipungu Dja Kaseng Kapitu; June 26, 1970 (age 56) Kolwezi, Lualaba Province, Zaire
- Relations: Patrice-Aime Sesanga (father)

Delly Sesanga Hipungu Dja Kaseng Kapitu is a Congolese lawyer and deputy in the National Assembly representing Luiza Territory. He was a candidate in the 2023 Democratic Republic of the Congo general election, but withdrew in favor of Moïse Katumbi. He is also the head of political party Envoi de la RDC.

== Biography ==
Sesanga was born on June 26, 1970, in Kolwezi, Lualaba Province, Zaire. He is the son of Patrice-Aime Sesanga, a lawyer and Congolese senator. He holds a doctorate in international security and defense from Grenoble Alpes University. he also holds a masters in business law and corporate taxation from Aix-Marseille University.

Sesanga left the Rally for Congolese Democracy (RCD) in the early 2000s, and returned to Paris for a short time. Between March 2003 and March 2006, Sesanga served as the chief of staff to the president of the Movement for the Liberation of the Congo (MLC) and vice-president of the Economy and Finance under Jean-Pierre Bemba. Between March 2006 and October 2006, he succeeded Alexis Thambwe Mwamba as Minister of Planning of the Democratic Republic of the Congo. He left this position after being elected deputy of Luiza Territory in the 2006 Democratic Republic of the Congo elections.

Sesanga was re-elected as a deputy during the 2011 Democratic Republic of the Congo elections, and supported Étienne Tshisekedi during the presidential election that year. In 2016, he was coordinator of the Alliance for the Republic, an alliance of sixteen political parties supporting Moïse Katumbi in the 2016 election. The election was postponed to 2018, and Katumbi was prevented from running. Sesanga pivoted to supporting Félix Tshisekedi instead. Under the Tshisekedi administration, Sesanga and deputies in his Envol party were critical of Tshisekedi, accusing him of a "regression of democracy" in the country.

Sesanga announced his candidacy for the 2023 Democratic Republic of the Congo presidential election in January 2023, but withdrew in December in favor of Moise Katumbi.

== Career within the National Assembly ==
Within the National Assembly, Sesanga led the Political, Administrative, and Legal Commission. He primarily focused on issues targeting administrative issues in the country including decentralization, freedom of demonstration, and judicial reform. He also worked to improve base infrastructure such as roads, education, and healthcare.
