= Jean-Claude Baende =

Congolese politician

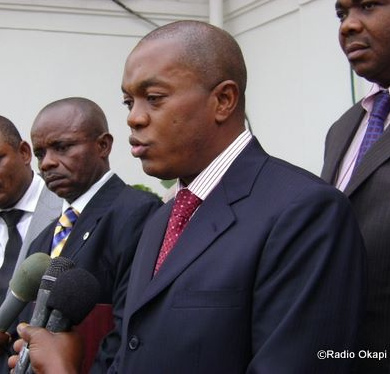
- Baende in 2010

Governor of Équateur
- In office November 2009 – March 2013
- Preceded by: Makila Sumanda
- Succeeded by: René Sébastien Bofaya Botaka (interim); Louis Alphonse Koyagialo

Provincial Deputy for Mbandaka
- In office 2006–2007

Personal details
- Born: May 24, 1963 (age 62) Basankusu, Democratic Republic of the Congo
- Education: University of Kinshasa; Universite libre de Bruxelles

Jean-Claude Baende is a politician in the Democratic Republic of the Congo. He is a national deputy who represented Mbandaka in the National Assembly in 2011, and served as governor of Équateur Province from 2009 to 2013. Baende unsuccessfully ran for president during the 2023 Democratic Republic of the Congo general election.

== Biography ==
Baende was born in Basankusu on May 24, 1963. He completed his primary and secondary studies in Gemena and Mbandaka respectively, graduating from grade school in 1982. Baende wanted to become a Catholic priest, and studied in the Grand Séminaire Saint-Jean-Baptiste-de-Bamanya in Mbandaka between 1982 and 1985, receiving a diploma with distinction. Between 1985 and 1988, Baende studied at the University of Kinshasa's seminary, receiving a graduate degree in theology. Between 1988 and 1990, he received diaconal training in the diocese of Lisala, and subsequently was ordained as priest of the archdiocese of Mbandaka-Bikoro by Cardinal Frédéric Etsou in November 1990. Baende later studied at the Université libre de Bruxelles.

In 2005, Baende created his own political party called the Alliance of Humanist Democrats. He was elected as provincial deputy for the city of Mbandaka in the 2006 Democratic Republic of the Congo general election. He was appointed vice-governor of Équateur Province in 2007, and ascended to become the province's governor in November 2009 following a motion of no confidence against Governor Makila Sumanda. He was elected as the national deputy for Mbandaka in 2011, but was dismissed from his position by President Joseph Kabila and encouraged to keep serving as governor of Équateur.

Baende was dismissed as governor in March 2013. He ran for the position again in 2016, but was defeated. In 2019, Baende ran again for governor, but withdrew his candidacy on the basis of corruption in the province. In 2023, Baende unsuccessfully ran for president.
