= Noël K. Tshiani Muadiamvita =

Congolese economist and politician

Doctor Noël Tshiani
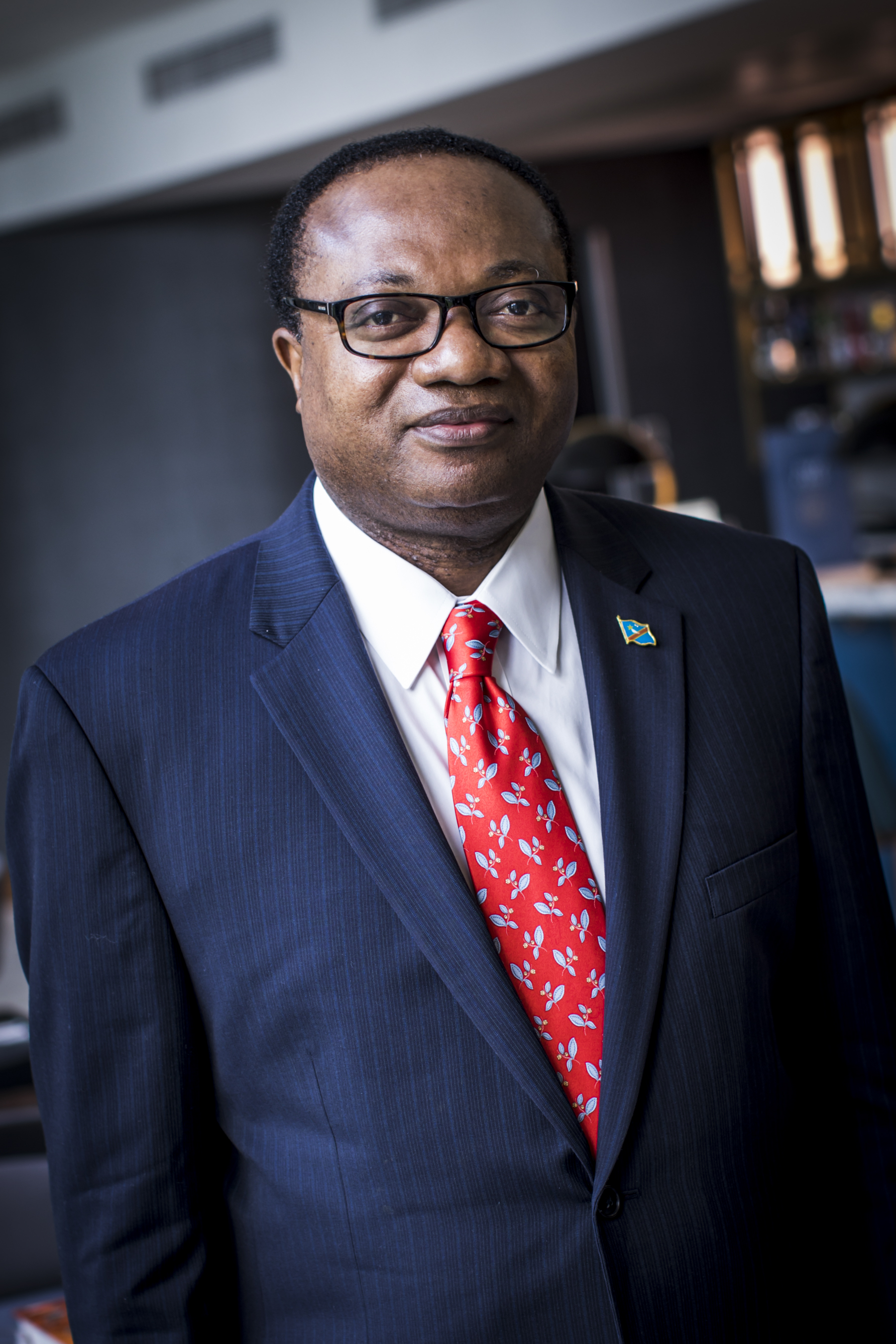
- Born: Noël Kabamba Tshiani Muadiamvita; 25 December 1957 (age 68): Ngandajika, Belgian Congo; (now DR Congo)
- Education: Paris Dauphine University
- Occupations: Economist, politician
- Political party: Independent

Noël Kabamba Tshiani Muadiamvita (born 25 December 1957) is a Congolese economist and politician. He was a presidential candidate in the 2018 and 2023 general elections. In 2021 and 2023, Tshiani proposed a law to restrict various government positions to only individuals who were born to Congolese parents.

== Early life ==
Noël Kabamba Tshiani Muadiamvita was born on 25 December 1957 in Ngandajika, Belgian Congo (now the Democratic Republic of the Congo). Tshiani studied at Paris Dauphine University, where he earned his doctorate in economics.

== Economic career ==
After earning his doctorate, Tshiani worked in France for Citibank and in the United States for Chase Manhattan Bank and Republic National Bank. He began working for the World Bank in 1992 as a financial specialist for industry and energy in the Sahel. In August 2004, Tshiani was appointed as the resident representative of the World Bank in Chad.

Tshiani has worked to restructure and develop struggling economies in West Africa, Eastern Europe, and Asia. His work in the Cape Verde Islands helped to increase the gross domestic product per capita in twenty years from 170 to 7,500 dollars in 2016.

Tshiani lead a team of World Bank experts who designed and implemented economic and financial reform program for the West African Development Bank (BOAD), the Central Bank for West African States (BCEAO) as well as the eight countries forming the West African Economic and Monetary Union (WAEMU): Benin, Burkina Faso, Côte d'Ivoire, Guinea-Bissau, Mali, Niger, Senegal, and Togo. The program significantly deepened the economic, financial and infrastructural integration of West African States.

Tshiani had previously worked for a decade as an International Lending Officer with JPMorgan Chase in New York; senior Credit Officer with the Republic National Bank of New York and an Account officer with Citibank N.A. He attended and successfully completed the Citibank Executive Management Training Program for lending officers held in Athens, Greece, and was an intern in the corporate and personal credit department of Banque Nationale de Paris in Grenoble, France.

As an economist on secondment from the World Bank, Tshiani co-chaired in 1997 the Monetary Reform Commission which designed and launched the Congolese Franc, replacing the much discredited currency of what had been Zaire. He further advised the President on strengthening the autonomy of the monetary authority, notably by dismantling the central bank board that included seven cabinet members and replacing them with independent technical experts. He is an advocate for independent central banks and believes that a well-functioning financial system is a prerequisite to ensure adequate resource allocation and support economic development. He regularly visits his country and monitors closely its economic, social and political developments and challenges.

== Political career ==
Tshiani ran for president in the 2018 presidential election as an independent. He received 23,548 votes—0.13 percent—and came in 14th place. Félix Tshisekedi was the election's ultimate winner.

In July 2021, Tshiani proposed a bill to the National Assembly to restrict 250 government offices—including president, prime minister, president of the Senate, and president of the National Assembly—to individuals born of a Congolese father and a Congolese mother. According to Tshiani, the bill's purpose is to "lock down about 250 positions that we consider to be under the sovereignty of our country". Although it was dismissed, it was proposed again in April 2023. The bill was opposed by the Catholic Church, most opposition political parties, and hundreds of protestors, who described the bill as "dangerous" and "discriminatory". Some of the bill's opponents claimed that it would intentionally prohibit Congolese politician Moïse Katumbi, whose father was Greek, from participating in the 2023 presidential election.

Tshiani was a presidential candidate in the 2023 election, however, he later withdrew his candidacy and endorsed Tshisekedi. Tshiani finished in 17th place and obtained 9,276 votes; meanwhile, Tshisekedi was elected to a second five year term.

== Political views ==
Tshiani has no political party affiliation. A technocrat and political outsider, Tshiani believes the DR Congo has been betrayed by its own leaders for decades.

According to indexmundi, the DRC was the poorest country in the world in 2016 based on gross domestic product per capita. At the same time, despite abundant natural resources, the country placed towards the bottom of the UN Development Programme's (UNDP) Human Development Index. Based on his experience, he believes that the path to shared prosperity is founded on good governance, integrity, the rule of law, human rights, equality, and opportunity for everyone.

In 2003, Tshiani launched the idea that the DRC needed a Marshall Plan to address structural problems and tackle achieve poverty. In 2003 and 2004, he published two articles in Jeune Afrique: "A Marshall Plan for the DRC"" and "Desperate times, bold measures," arguing that reforms to date had failed. He now proposes a Marshall Plan lasting 15 years and requiring US$800 billion to fundamentally transform the economy and create opportunities for all. Above all, he has a unique vision to develop the DRC.

=== Marshall Plan for the Congo ===
In support of his ambitions to transform his native country and create opportunities for all its citizens, Tshiani unveiled on 22 January 2016 in a Time Magazine article, the summary of his Marshall Plan for the Congo whose details are contained in his book: La Force du Changement or the Force of Change. The 15-year plan he proposes for DRC comprises fifteen comprehensive and coherent programs of development, with the private sector driving growth and international and diaspora expertise tapped as needed.

The seven of the fifteen complementary programs of development consist of:

- Promoting peace, security, rule of law, and democracy by restructuring the army and police and building strong democratic institutions and transparent practices;
- Advancing human capital, through education, health, and nutrition, creating opportunity and a level playing field for all, including Congolese women, who suffer not only legal discrimination but one of the world's highest rates of sexual and gender-based violence;
- Mobilizing domestic resources through transparent, effective tax collection and anticorruption measures;
- Supporting a responsible domestic private sector backed by functioning public administration and the rule of law;
- Taking on large-scale, labor-intensive infrastructure projects to create jobs as well as desperately needed enablers of trade and growth;
- Boosting and accelerating local industrialization to refine and process minerals and mechanize farming, livestock, and fisheries; promoting sustainable forest management; and supporting service sectors including tourism; and
- Identifying and tapping domestic and regional market synergies: DRC is now a member of a 26-country regional integration arrangement that extends from South Africa to Egypt and is home to 625 million people with an estimated GDP of US$1.3 trillion.

Tshiani estimates that this plan will cost about $800 billion over 15 years, in domestic resources, bilateral and multilateral aid, and foreign direct investment. It will also require a wholesale rethinking of development strategy and governance, with transparency a top priority. Tshiani believes that the government can finance the major portion of the plan with internally generated revenues by combatting corruption, reforming the justice system and creating an attractive business environment.

Tshiani believes that, executed wisely, his plan could turn one of the world's poorest economies into a driver of African growth and would increase the GDP per capita from its current level of 394 dollars to 15,000 in 15 years. In his own words, if his countrymen work together, "the impossible isn't Congolese".

== Publications ==
Tshiani has authored one thesis and five books regarding economics and monetary policy:

1. Central Bank Independence, Accountability, and Impact on Monetary Policy: Application to the Case of the Democratic Republic of the Congo (2000, Paris Dauphine University; OCLC 490604191)
2. Vision for a Strong Currency: Advocacy for a New Monetary Policy in the Congo (2008, Editions L'Harmattan; ISBN 9782296188976)
3. Building Credible Central Banks: Policy Lessons For Emerging Economies (2008, Springer Science+Business Media; ISBN 9780230594258)
4. The Battle for a Credible National Currency (2012, Larcier; ISBN 9782875960030)
5. Desperate Times, Bold Measures: A Marshall Plan for the Democratic Republic of the Congo (2016, Les Éditions du Panthéon; ISBN 9782754730648);
6. The Force of Change: Building a More Beautiful Country Than Before (2016, Les Éditions du Panthéon; ISBN 9782754730624)

== Electoral history ==
Year	Office	Type	Party	Main opponent	Party	Votes for Tshiani				Result	Swing
Year	Office	Type	Party	Main opponent	Party	Total	%	P.	±%	Result	Swing
2018	President of the DRC	General	Independent	Félix Tshisekedi	UDSP	23,548	0.13	14th	N/A	Lost	Gain
2023	President of the DRC	General	Independent	Félix Tshisekedi	UDSP	9,276	0.05	17th	–0.08	Lost	Hold
