= Marie-Josée Ifoku =

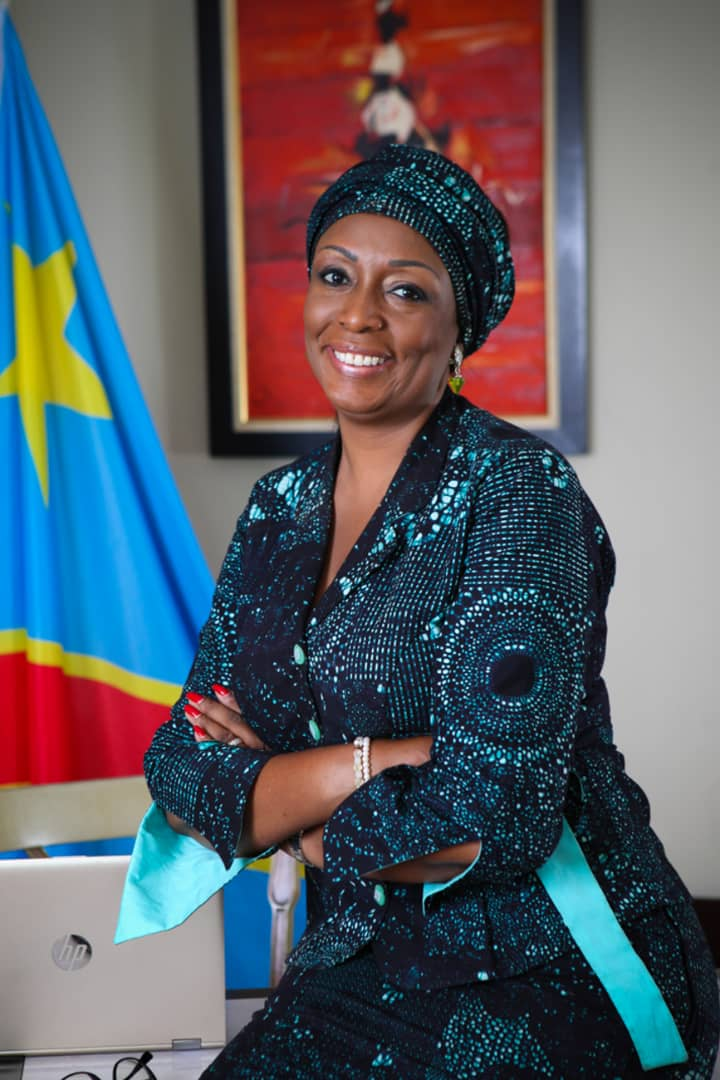

Governor of Tshuapa Province
- In office October 2016 – October 2017
- President: Joseph Kabila
- Preceded by: Cyprien Lomboto
- Succeeded by: Pancrace Boongo

Personal details
- Born: 6 February 1965 (age 61) Kinshasa
- Party: Alliance of Elites for A New Congo

Marie-Josée Ifoku Mputa Mpunga (born 6 February 1965, Kinshasa) is a Congolese politician and was the only female candidate in the 2018 Democratic Republic of the Congo presidential election. She was also the governor of the Tshuapa Province in 2016–2017.

== Biography ==
She was born in 1965 in Kinshasa and spent her childhood in Belgium and the Netherlands before returning to the DRC and graduating from a high school in the capital. She later attended a university in France and in Canada. Ifoku worked in real estate and in the automobile industry for several years. In 2004 she returned to the DRC.

Ifoku began her political career in 2015 as a deputy special commissioner of Tshuapa Province. She later became vice-governor and then governor of the province. Ifoku cites Catherine Samba-Panza as her inspiration for becoming involved in politics.

In 2018 she ran as the presidential candidate of the Alliance of Elites for A New Congo.
