= Seth Kikuni =

Congolese politician

Personal details
- Born: 14 December 1981 (age 44) Kinshasa, Zaire

Seth Kikuni (born 14 December 1981 in Kinshasa) is a Congolese entrepreneur, businessman, and politician who was one of the candidates in the 2018 Democratic Republic of the Congo presidential election. He was the youngest candidate.

== Career ==
Seth Kikuni was a candidate in the 2023 presidential election. He filed a petition with the Constitutional Court to invalidate the candidacy of the incumbent president Félix Tshisekedi. His petition is declared inadmissible. In November 2023, Kikuni withdrew in favor of Moïse Katumbi. In September 2024, Seth Kikuni was arrested by the Congolese National Intelligence Agency as part of an investigation into charges of incitement and spreading false information during a political rally in Lubumbashi. He was imprisoned in Makala Central Prison in Kinshasa. On 28 November, Kikuni was convicted and sentenced to a one-year prison term. On March 1, 2025, Justice Minister Constant Mutamba granted “conditional release” to other rivals; Mike Mukebay and Seth Kikuni.
