= Théodore Ngoy =

Congolese politician

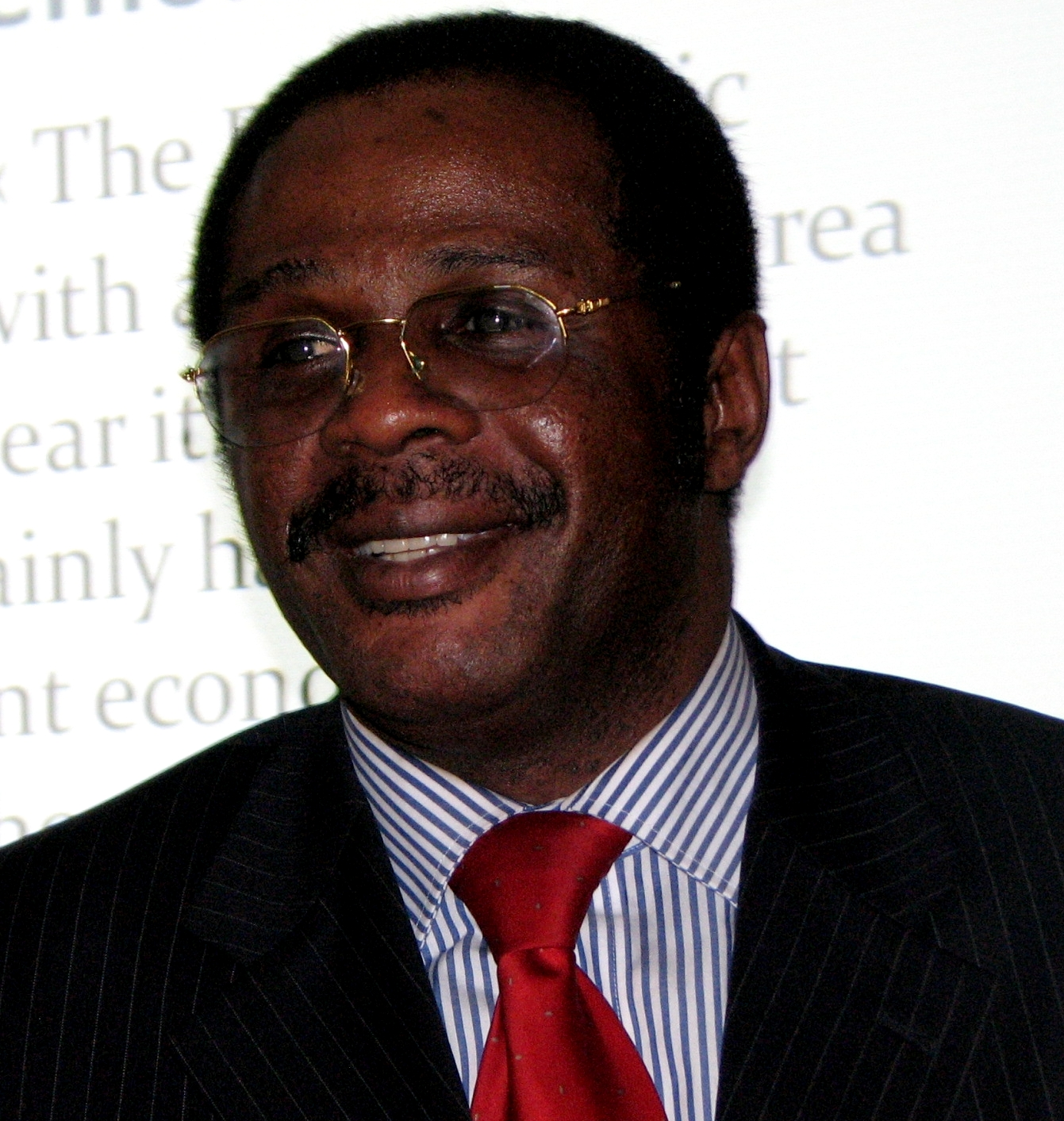
- Ngoy in 2009

Provincial Deputy for Katanga
- In office 2006 – March 2007

Personal details
- Born: Théodore Ngoy Ilunga wa Nsenga
- Occupation: Politician, preacher

Théodore Ngoy Ilunga wa Nsenga, also known as Theodore Ngoy, is a Congolese politician and evangelical pastor who ran for president during the 2006, 2018, and 2023 presidential elections.

== Biography ==
Between 1997 and 1998, Ngoy was detained for preaching that bordered insulting the head of state. Ngoy first ran as a candidate during the 2006 Congolese presidential election. He was arrested in December 2005 again for insulting the head of state once more, but escaped to the South African embassy after trial on the Court of Cassation. He returned sometime in 2006, being elected as provincial deputy for Katanga. However, Ngoy and his supporters were suppressed by the government of Joseph Kabila. In March 2007, Ngoy's residence and the Gombe Church where he preached were set ablaze by Kabila's supporters, and he was forced to flee to the United Kingdom. From abroad, Ngoy urged Congolese civilians to remove Kabila from power.

Ngoy unsuccessfully ran for president in the 2018 election, and again in 2023. During the 2023 election, Ngoy received 4,132 votes or .02% of the vote, the lowest of any candidate. He filed a request with the Constitutional Court to contest the results, citing fraud, but his claims were deemed unfounded by the court.
