= Independent National Electoral Commission (Democratic Republic of the Congo) =

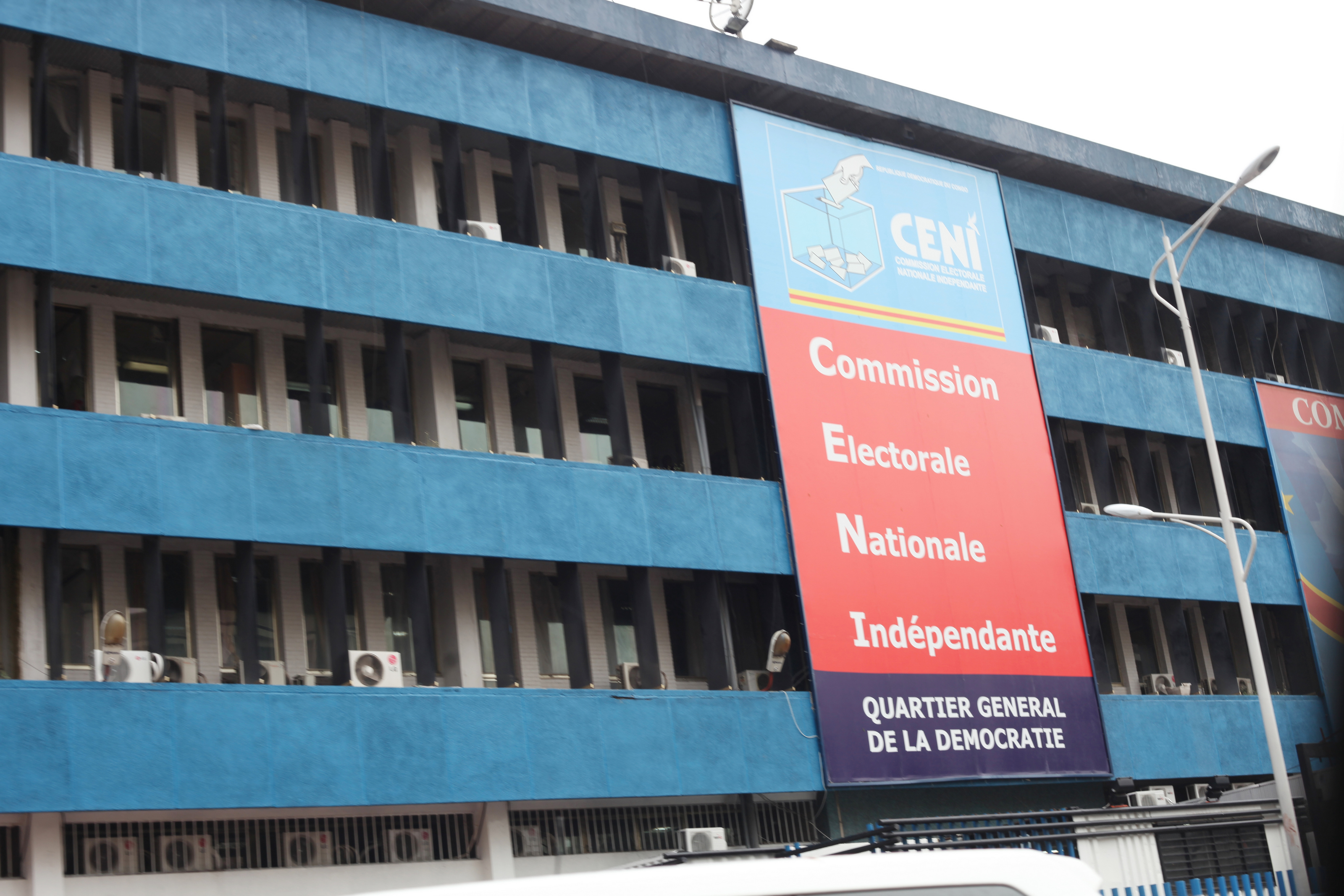
CENI Headquarters in Kinshasa

The Independent National Electoral Commission (French: Commission Électorale Nationale Indépendante or CENI) is the body that runs elections in the Democratic Republic of the Congo.

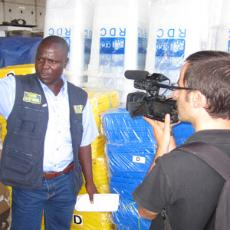
A CENI election official speaks to the Voice of America

This organization was tasked with executing the country's 2016 general election. However, it delayed the election until 2018 "because the number of voters isn’t known." The country's political opposition alleged that the country's president Joseph Kabila was trying to remain in power after his constitutionally mandated term expires.

CENI's bank accounts are held at the BGFIBank Group. It held US$55 million as of May 2016. The same month, it borrowed an additional US$25 million from the BFGIBank, with $2.4 million in fees. According to Le Monde, the 2016 presidential elections were postponed on the grounds that the CENI lacked sufficient funds to register voters.

In October 2021, the president of the National Assembly gave 72 hours to the eight religious denominations to come to an agreement. They meet to try to agree on the name of the future president of CENI.

CENI's president is Denis Kadima Kazadi.

== List of presidents ==
- Apollinaire Malu Malu (April 2013 – October 2015)
- Corneille Nangaa (2015–2021)
- Denis Kadima Kazadi (2021– )
