= Martin Fayulu =

Congolese politician (born 1956)

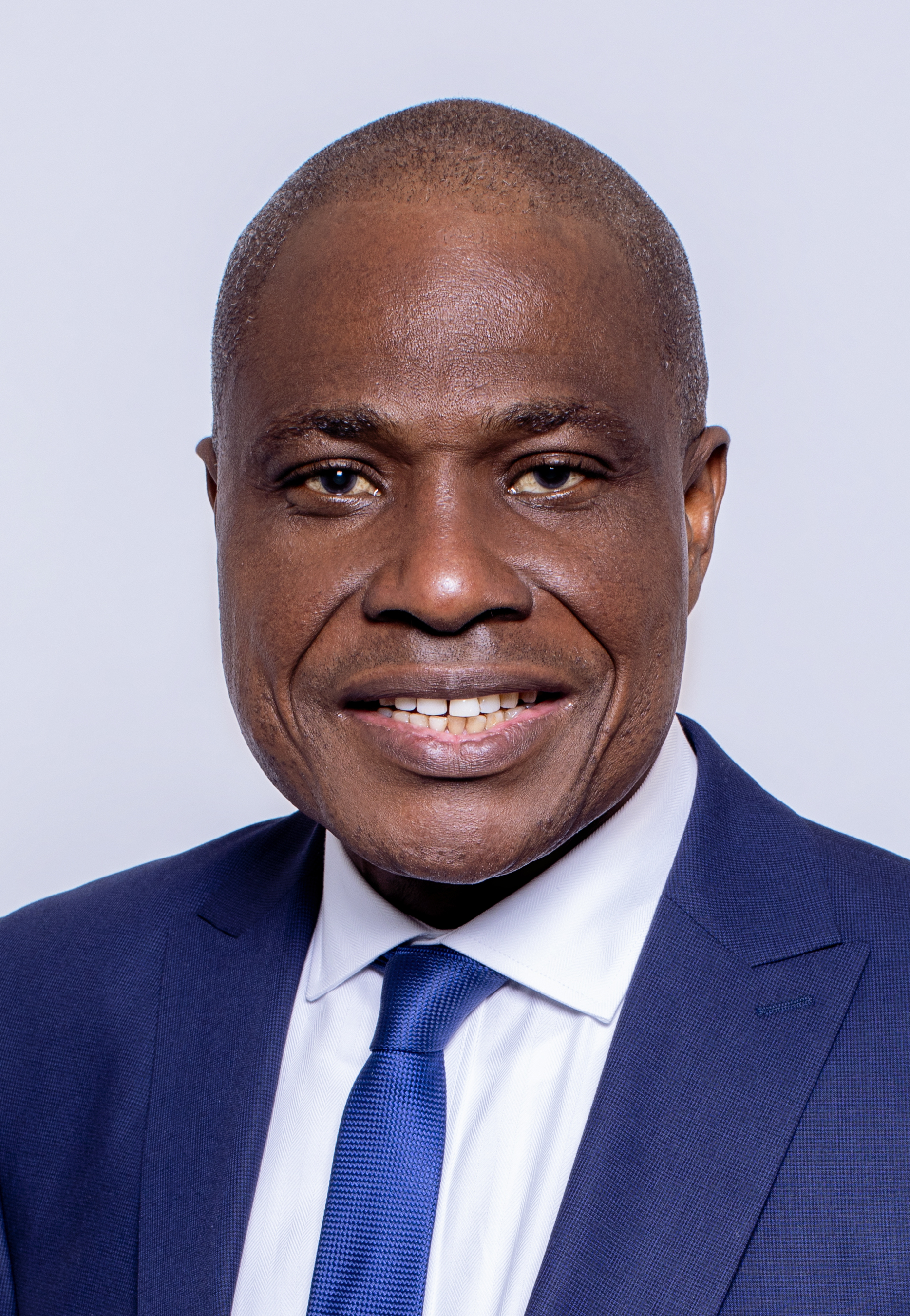
- Fayulu in 2018.

Member of the National Assembly
- In office 28 November 2011 – 7 March 2019
- Constituency: Lukunga District, Kinshasa

Personal details
- Born: 21 November 1956 (age 69) Léopoldville, Belgian Congo (now Kinshasa, DR Congo)
- Education: Paris 12 Val de Marne University; Institut Superieur de Gestion; European University of America

Martin Madidi Fayulu (born 21 November 1956) is a Congolese politician and businessman. He leads the Engagement for Citizenship and Development party. On 11 November 2018, he was chosen by seven opposition leaders to be their joint presidential candidate in the 2018 Democratic Republic of the Congo general election. Within 24 hours, Félix Tshisekedi, the eventual official winner of the 2018 presidential election, despite being widely viewed as fraudulent, and Vital Kamerhe, the other opposition candidate, rescinded their endorsement of his candidacy and formed their own pact with Tshisekedi as candidate.

== Early life and career ==
Born in Kinshasa (then called Léopoldville) Martin Fayulu became an ExxonMobil executive and worked with the oil company from 1984 until 2003. He served as the company's director-general in Ethiopia as his last post.

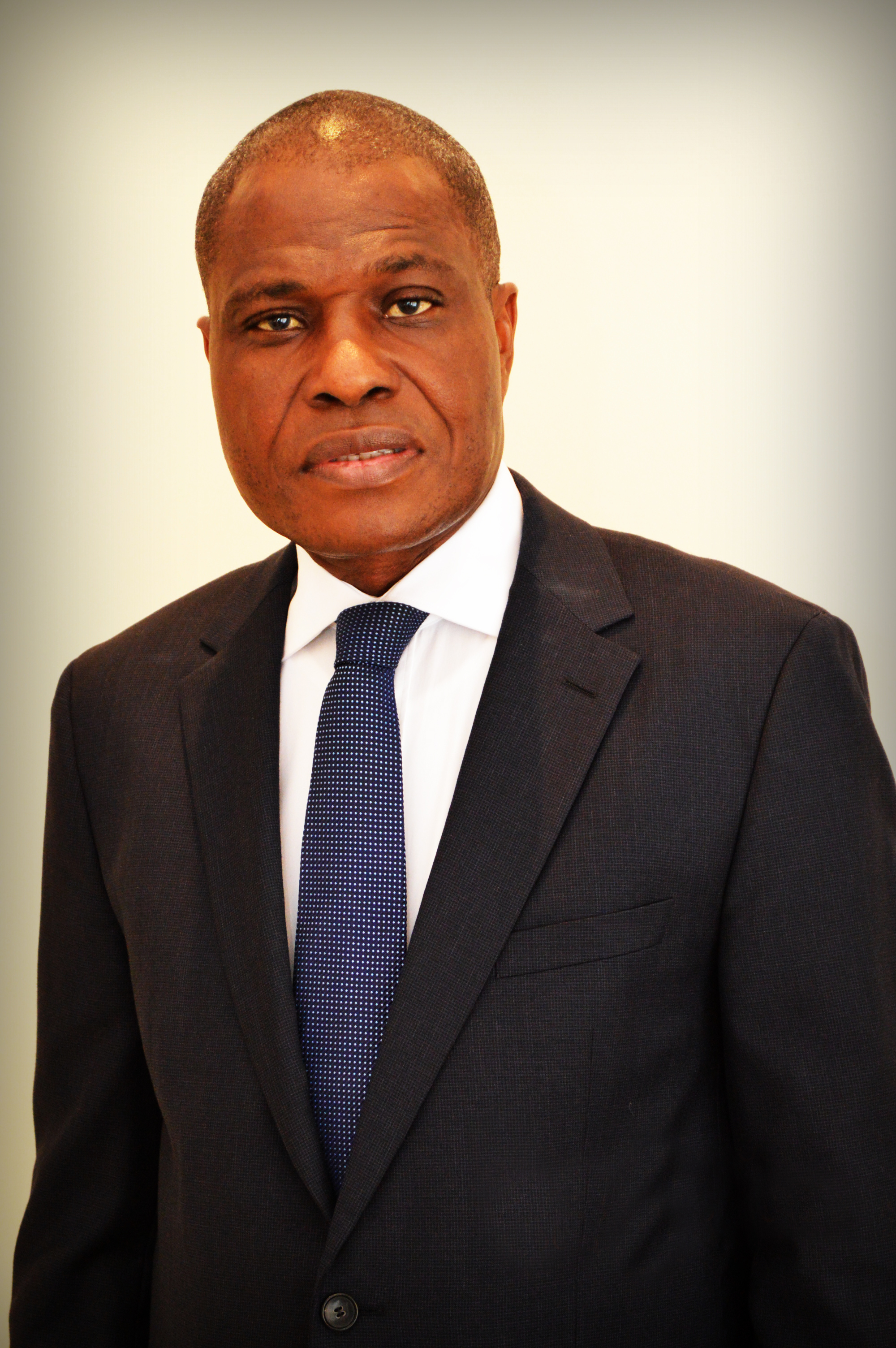
Fayulu in 2015

== Political career ==
His involvement in politics began in 1991 when he attended the Sovereign National Conference, which brought together delegates from different regions and organizations to campaign for a multi-party democracy. Mobutu Sese Seko, the totalitarian President of Zaire (as the Democratic Republic of the Congo was then called), allowed the conference to take place but rejected its conclusions.

Fayulu did not enter politics full time until 2006, after Mobutu and his dictatorship were gone. In the 2006 and 2011 general elections, he was elected as an MP to the National Assembly. In 2009, he established the Commitment for Citizenship and Development party, which has three MPs, including Fayulu.

Félix Tshisekedi was declared the winner of the December 2018 election, despite election observers' belief that Fayulu had won the vote, in what was seen by Fayulu and his supporters as a deal between Tshisekedi and outgoing President Joseph Kabila. Fayulu challenged the result in the DRC's Constitutional Court, which has been criticised for being staffed primarily by Kabila appointees, and thus by late January 2019 the court ruled that Tshisekedi was the rightful winner and he was sworn in as President. He has continued to remain active in politics since the election, continuing to claim that he was the rightful winner. In late July 2019, he met in Lubumbashi with members of the opposition, including former Katanga Province governor Moïse Katumbi, former Prime Minister Adolphe Muzito, and a representative of former rebel leader Jean-Pierre Bemba. They discussed the future of the opposition and democracy in the DRC.

During the M23 campaign in early 2025, Fayulu called on the leader of the rebel Congo River Alliance, Corneille Nangaa, to stop the fighting and to respect the integrity of the country's territory and the lives of Congolese people.
