= François-David Ekofo =

François-David "Franck" Ekofo Bonyeku is a Protestant pastor in the Democratic Republic of the Congo who was forced into exile after he publicly criticized President Joseph Kabila in January 2018.

== Career ==
Ekofo is an ordained minister in the Community of Disciples of Christ, one of the member denominations within the Church of Christ in Congo. He received his Master in Sacred Theology (STM) at Christian Theological Seminary in Indianapolis then earned a PhD in Religious Studies at the University of Strasbourg in France. The title of his dissertation was "Iesus Pais Theou: :L'interprértation d'Ésaïe 53 par Jésus et par l'Église Primitive" .He returned to Congo in 1987, after 8 years outside the country. He became a professor of New Testament at the Protestant University in Congo and also served as a pastor at the International Protestant Church in Kinshasa. He also served as dean of the Faculty of Theology at the Protestant University.

== Criticism of Kabila ==
Ekofo ran afoul of the regime of Joseph Kabila when he delivered a sermon calling for political change and complaining about the failures of the Congolese state. At a service on January 16, 2018, commemorating the 17th anniversary of the assassination of President Laurent Kabila, Ekofo asserted that, as in a relay race, it was time for the baton to be passed to another generation in Congo. He went on to complain that Congo had no effective state and to dream of Congo becoming a country where its abundant natural resources were used to improve the lives of its people. The service, held in the Cathédrale du Centenaire, the leading church in the Church of Christ in Congo, was attended by President Kabila's wife Olive Lembe di Sita, Prime Minister Bruno Tshibala, Justice Minister Alexis Thambwe Mwamba and secretary general of the ruling party Henri Mova Sakanyi, among others. Immediately after delivering this sermon, Ekofo and his family received death threats. They were forced into hiding, and on February 4, 2018, the United Nations evacuated them from the country.

== Personal life ==
Ekofo is married to pastor Melanie Ekofo with four children.
