= First Lady of the Democratic Republic of the Congo =

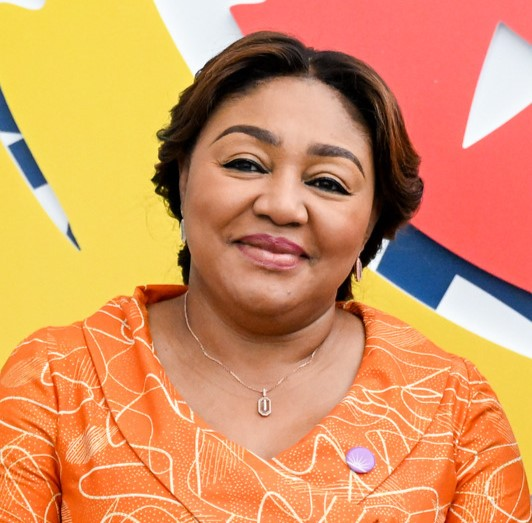
- Incumbent; Denise Tshisekedi since January 24, 2019
- Inaugural holder: Hortense Kasa-Vubu
- Formation: July 1, 1960

First Lady of the Democratic Republic of the Congo (French: Première Dame de la République démocratique du Congo) is the title attributed to the wife of the president of the Democratic Republic of the Congo.

The country's current first lady is Denise Tshisekedi, wife of President Félix Tshisekedi, who had held the title since January 24, 2019.

== First Ladies ==
No.	Name	Portrait	Term Began	Term Ended	President	Notes
1	Hortense Kasa-Vubu		July 1, 1960	November 24, 1965	Joseph Kasa-Vubu	Kasa-Vubu, who was born Hortense Ngoma Masunda, married Joseph Kasa-Vubu in a Catholic ceremony on October 10, 1941.
2	Marie-Antoinette Mobutu		November 24, 1965	October 22, 1977	Mobutu Sese Seko	As First Lady of Zaire beginning in 1971. Marie-Antoinette Mobutu, the first wife of President Mobutu Sese Seko, died from heart failure on October 22, 1977.
Position technically vacant			October 22, 1977	May 1, 1980	Mobutu Sese Seko	Marie-Antoinette Mobutu died on October 22, 1977.
3	Bobi Ladawa Mobutu		May 1, 1980	May 16, 1997	Mobutu Sese Seko	As First Lady of Zaire. Bobi Ladawa had been Sese Seko's longtime mistress during the 1970s. The couple had children together even before the death of Sese Seko's first wife, Marie-Antoinette Mobutu, in 1977. Ladawa and Sese Seko married in a church and civil wedding on May 1, 1980, on the eve of Pope John Paul II's visit to Zaire. However, the Pope refused to officiate the ceremony.
4	Sifa Mahanya		May 17, 1997	January 16, 2001	Laurent-Désiré Kabila	Sifa Mahanya was the main wife of Laurent-Désiré Kabila, who reportedly had at least 13 wives, and matriarch of the Kabilas. According to official biographies, Mahanya and Laurent Kabila are the parents of former President Joseph Kabila. However, this parentage is disputed by some observers and opposition figures.
Position vacant			January 16, 2001	June 1, 2006	Joseph Kabila	President Joseph Kabila was not married at the time.
5	Olive Lembe di Sita		June 1, 2006	January 24, 2019	Joseph Kabila	Olive Lembe di Sita married President Joseph Kabila on June 1, 2006, and they celebrated their wedding on June 17, 2006 at the presidential residence in Gombe, Kinshasa.
6	Denise Tshisekedi		January 24, 2019		Félix Tshisekedi	
