= Nsele Valley Park =

Protected area in DR Congo

Coordinates: 4°16′S 15°41′E

- Parc de la Vallée de la N'sele
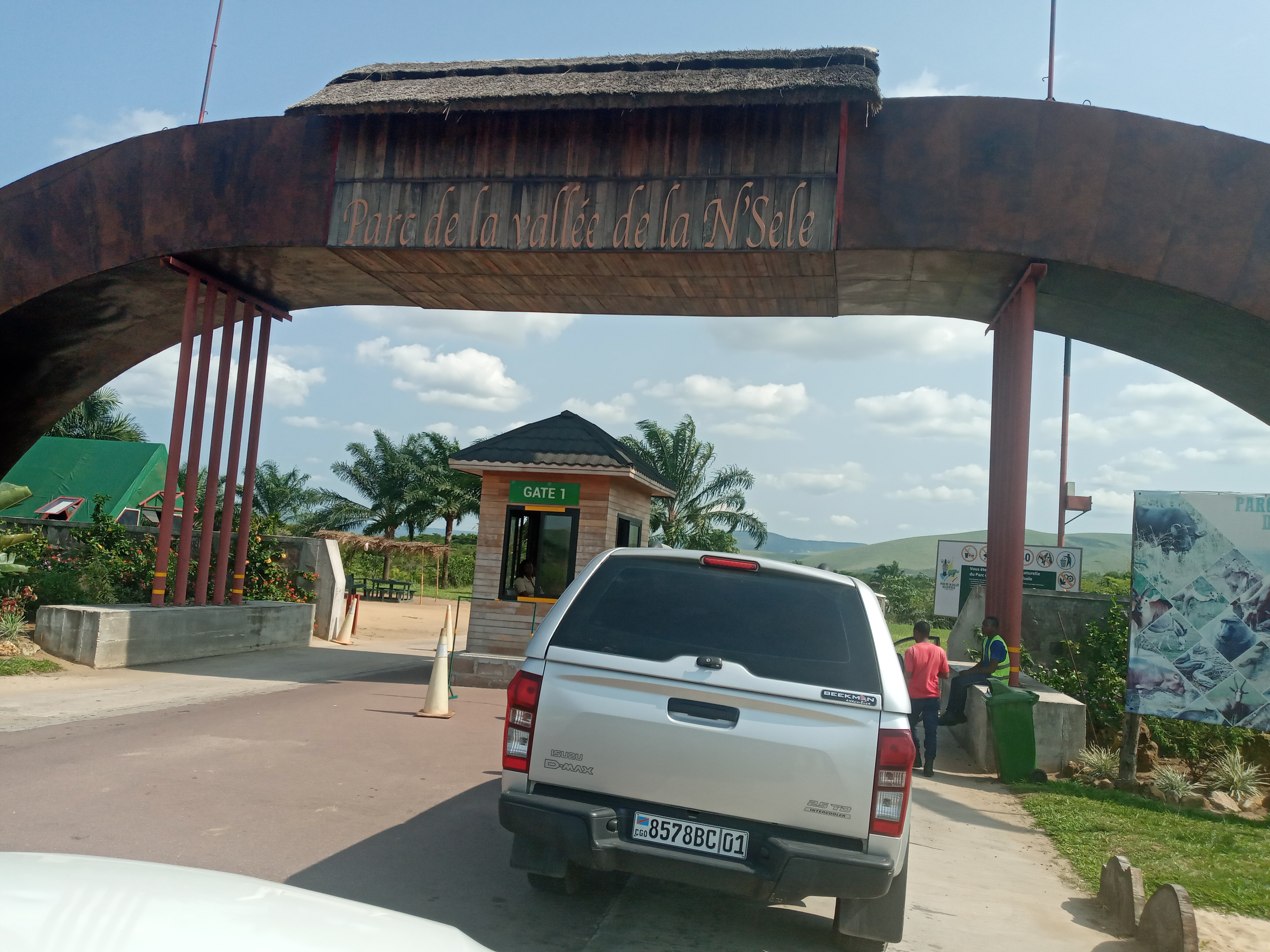
- Park entrance in 2020
- Interactive map of Nsele Valley Park
- Type: City park
- Location: Maluku, Kinshasa, Democratic Republic of the Congo
- Area: 20,000 hectares (77 sq mi)
- Created: June 2018
- Founder: Joseph Kabila and Olive Lembe di Sita
- Owner: Joseph Kabila and Olive Lembe di Sita
- Status: Open all year
- Website: https://parcdelavalleedelansele.com/le-parc/

Nsele Valley Park (French: Parc de la Vallée de la Nsele), colloquially known as Kingakati Park or N'Sele Nature Reserve, is a nature reserve located in the Maluku commune of Kinshasa in the western region of the Democratic Republic of the Congo (DRC). It is bordered to the north by the National N1, to the east by the Batéké Plateau, to the south by the Kindu group, the Nsingi mountains, and to the west by the Mangweme, Kindobo and Bambala villages. The park was established by then-President Joseph Kabila and his wife Olive Lembe di Sita and operates as a subsidiary of Ferme Espoir, an agro-food farm spanning Haut Katanga, Kongo Central, Kinshasa, and North Kivu.

== Geography ==
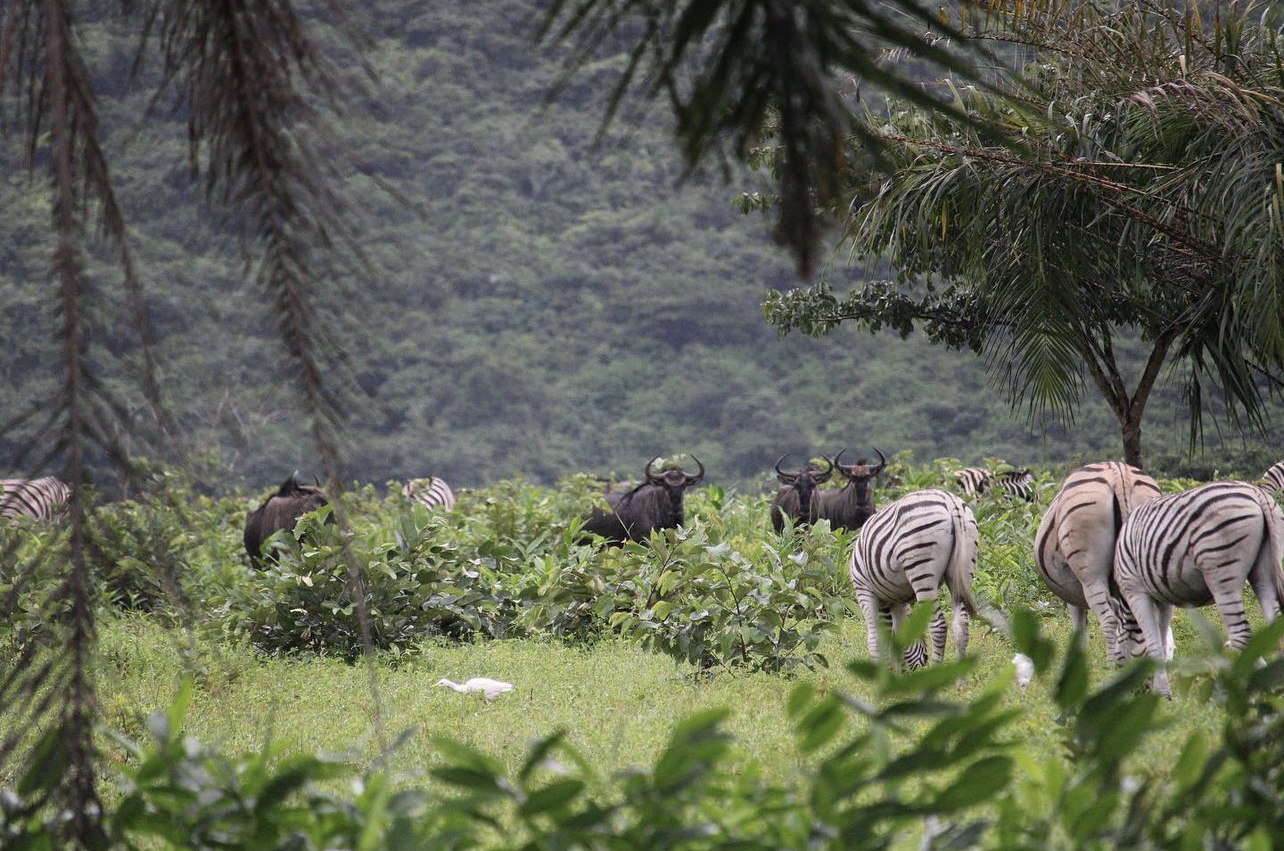
Nsele Valley Park, October 2021

The park's geography is characterized by rolling hills, riverbanks, and floodplains, offering visitors views of the natural surroundings and opportunities for outdoor activities such as hiking, wildlife viewing, and boating along the river. Water collection and pumping stations from sources built in the valley have been equipped to bring water back to the 300-meter-long uneven plateau, with piping extending over 700 meters.

The park has a restaurant, nightclub, and VIP lounge housed in transformed plane wrecks. Additionally, the park has green energies, including photovoltaic solar panels, wind power, mechanization, and a small hydroelectric power station.

== History ==
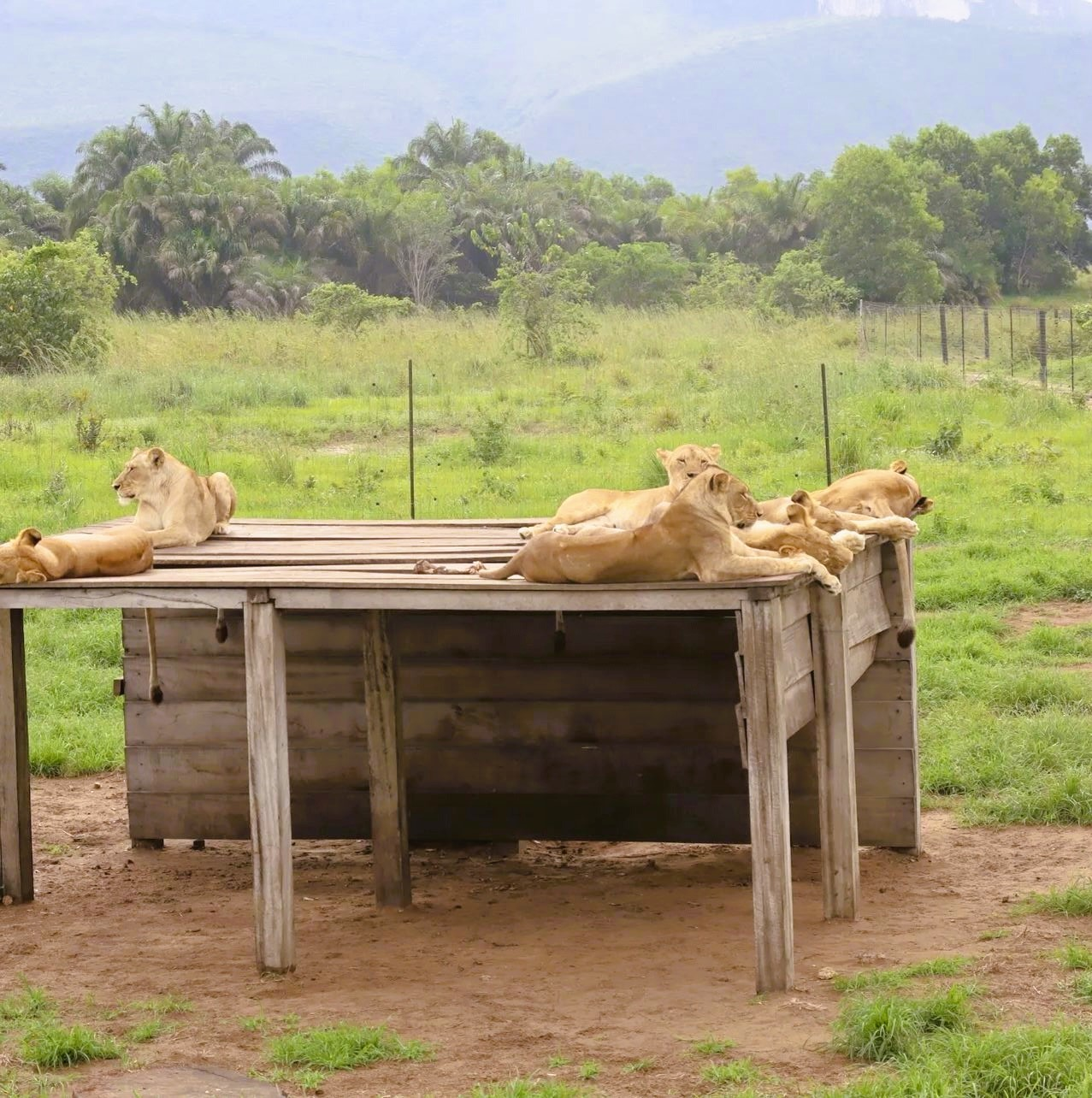
Nsele Valley Park, October 2021

The park was opened in June 2018 by former President Joseph Kabila and his wife, Olive Lembe di Sita. Kabila transformed it into a game reserve before he departed from the presidency. According to Kenya Insights, an independent Kenyan newspaper reports that a large number of animals have been imported from Namibia by Wildlife Vets. The formal acquisition of the land remains shrouded in mystery. It is one of the few Kabila properties that were never touched during an investigation conducted by Bloomberg and the Congo Research Group in 2017. The park has become a significant attraction in Kinshasa, with 1,700 visitors flocking to it every weekend for safaris for 50,000 Congolese francs ($21.51).

== Main exhibits ==
Nsele Valley Park provides a home to numerous species of animals, such as African bush elephants, African buffalos, Impalas, Sitatunga antelopes, hippos, crocodiles, lions, rhinoceroses, giant elands, Roan antelopes, zebras, giraffes, bushbucks, oribis, giant pangolins, wildebeests, python, primates, and various bird species.

== Activities ==
Activities or services available to tourists:

- Tyrolean traverse
- Kayak
- Pedalo Hiking
- Horse riding
- Cycling
- Mountain biking
- Swimming
- Minigolf
- Playground
- Team Building
- Safari
- Catering
- Meetings
- Events
