= 2004 Democratic Republic of the Congo coup attempt =

2004 DRC coup attempt
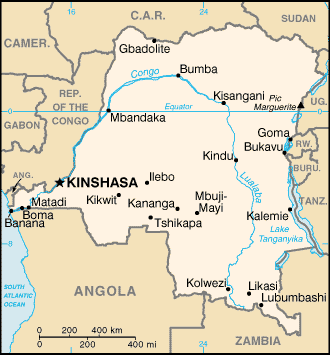
Date	11 June 2004; 22 years ago
Location	Kinshasa, Democratic Republic of the Congo
Result	Failure of the coup attempt

Belligerents
Armed Forces of the Democratic Republic of the Congo	(Democratic Republic of the Congo) Dissenting faction of the armed forces

Commanders and leaders
(Democratic Republic of the Congo) Joseph Kabila	(Democratic Republic of the Congo) Eric Lenge

The 2004 Democratic Republic of the Congo (DRC) coup attempt was a foiled coup d'état against the UN-backed Transitional Government, led by renegade members of the presidential guard, including Major Eric Lenge. At 2:40 AM local time on June 11, rebel forces briefly seized control of state broadcast stations and announced the suspension of the country's transitional institutions with Major Lenge assuming control himself. The nation's capital of Kinshasa also experienced a blackout, reportedly caused by the rebels. Lacking support from government officials or external powers, the coup failed miserably.

By dawn at 5:15 AM, loyalist troops had successfully regained control of state radio and forced Major Lenge and his men retreating to a military base in Kinshasa. Sounds of shelling and gunfire could be heard in the capital as clashes took place in the military base, city center, and the presidential residence. Lenge's men reportedly sought refuge by contacting several foreign embassies. By midday, twelve of the twenty soldiers accompanying the ringleader to the base were already arrested while the rest fled, including Major Lenge. He was later surrounded at Kinshasa's Ndjili airport by government forces. However, Major Lenge including his men were somehow able to flee in a convoy of jeeps. He eventually evaded capture, prompting opposition figures to accuse Kabila of staging the coup himself to gain emergency powers. In response, a presidential spokesman explained that reluctance to use force in order to not endanger civilians was the main reason government forces failed to promptly capture Major Lenge. In July, he was extradited from Brazzaville, Republic of Congo, to the DRC.

The international community condemned the coup attempt at large: the African Union Chairman Alpha Oumar Konare praised the transitional government for being able to suppress the coup while the United Nations in the DRC (MONUC) firmly supported the transitional government and denounced any threats to the transitional process.
