= Tshisekedi =

Tshisekedi is a surname. Notable people with the surname include:

- Denise Nyakéru Tshisekedi (born 1970), wife of Felix;
- Etienne Tshisekedi (1932–2017), Congolese politician and party leader;
- Félix Tshisekedi (born 1963), Congolese politician and president of the Democratic Republic of the Congo.
