= Banyamulenge =

Minority ethnic group in South Kivu province, DR Congo

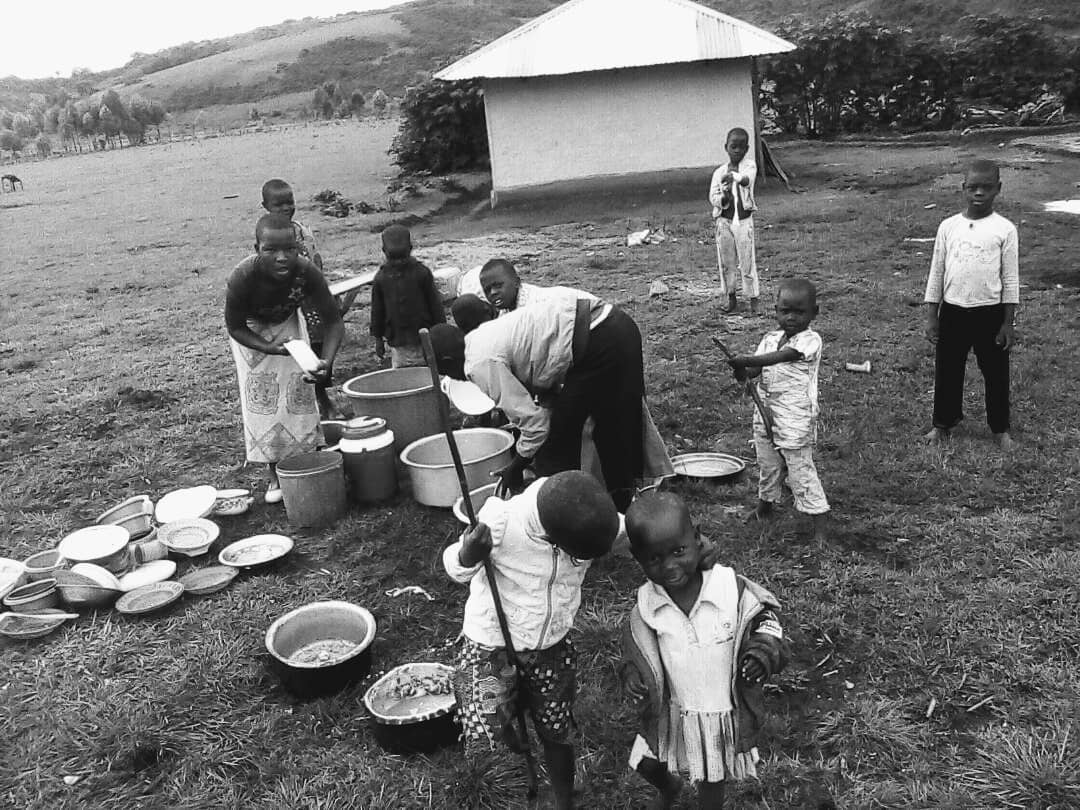
- Banyamulenge children

Languages
- Kinyarwanda

Religion
- Christianity

The Banyamulenge are a community that lives mainly in South Kivu, Democratic Republic of the Congo, and trace their ancestral origins to what is now Rwanda. Their main language is Kinyarwanda.

The Banyamulenge played a role in Mobutu's war against and victory over the Simba Rebellion, which was not supported by the majority of other tribes in South Kivu. They supported him to be naturalised in what was then Zaire. Their role during the First Congo War and subsequent regional conflicts (Rally for Congolese Democracy–Goma, Movement for the Liberation of the Congo, National Congress for the Defence of the People, and more importantly for the fact that two of the most influential presidents of their country declared them as enemies of the state in both 1996 (Mobutu Sese Seko) and 1998 (Laurent-Désiré Kabila).

The Banyamulenge have been a point of controversy in the country since they played a key role in tensions against the Simba Rebellion (1963–1965), First Congo War (1996–1997), Second Congo War (1998–2003), and Joseph Kabila's regime (2001–2019). The wars in the DRC have affected more than 10 million lives, with casualties continuing in Ituri, North Kivu, South Kivu, and Tanganyika provinces.

In the late 1990s, the political scientist René Lemarchand stated the main ethnic groups' claim that the Banyamulenge numbered around 50,000 to 70,000. Gérard Prunier quotes around 60,000–80,000, a figure of about 3% to 4% of the total provincial population. Lemarchand states the figure of 400,000 given by Joseph Mutambo "is grossly inflated". Lemarchand also noted that the group represents "a rather unique case of ethnogenesis".

== Etymology ==
Mulenge is a term historically referring to mountains concentrated on the High Plateau of South Kivu, in the eastern region of the Democratic Republic of the Congo, close to the Burundi-Congo-Rwanda border. The term translates literally as "people of Mulenge", a groupement on the Itombwe plateau. The name was chosen in the early 1970s to avoid being called "Banyarwanda" and being seen as foreigners in what was then Zaire. In 1976, the word "Banyamulenge" first came into wide usage after Gisaro Muhazo, a South Kivutian deputy, began an initiative to reclassify the Banyamulenge of Mwenga, Fizi and Uvira into a single administrative entity. Muhazo's attempt failed, but the term that he introduced remained. Over the decades, it became a catchall label including the Rwandans living in the eastern parts.

== Origins and early political status ==
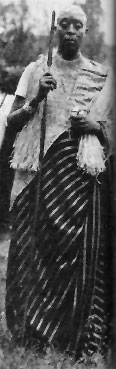
Watusi princes of the Belgian Congo

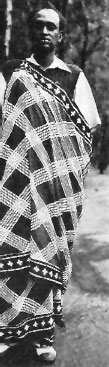

While the RPF claims that Banyamulenge were brought in the 18th century from Rwanda, Burundi and the Karagwa area of Tanzania, records and historical data show Banyamulenge came to the area in the 20th century and were used by the Belgian king.

A Rwandan narrative claims that the migration took place because Tutsis tried to avoid the increasingly high taxes imposed by Mwami Rwabugiri of the Kingdom of Rwanda. That, however, is grossly false as there are no known conflicts to have existed to the point of migration into the Congo. Also, Rwandan Tutsis fled the violent war of succession that erupted in 1895, after the death of Rwabugiri. The group was mostly Tutsi and their Hutu abagaragu (clients), who had been icyihuture (turned Tutsi), which negated interethnic tensions. They settled above the Ruzizi Plain, on the Itombwe Plateau. The plateau, which reached an altitude of 3000 meters, could not support large-scale agriculture, but allowed cattle grazing. That version is grossly disputed because various tribes had been in conflict over where the newcomers would stay to herd their sheep. They were thus given the Mulenge Mountain to herd.

Banyarwanda migrants continued to arrive, particularly as labourers, during the colonial period. The Union Minière du Haut Katanga recruited more than 7000 workers from 1925 to 1929. From the 1930s, Congolese Banyarwanda immigrants continued coming in search of work, with a major influx of Tutsi refugees in 1959–1960, after the "Social Revolution", led by the Hutu Grégoire Kayibanda. While the early migrants lived primarily as pastoralists in the high plains, colonial labour migrants moved to urban areas. Refugees were placed in refugee camps. In 1924, the pastoralists received permission from colonial authorities to occupy a high plateau further south.

The groups received further immigrants during the overthrow of the Tutsi monarchy and the colonial clashes between 1959 and 1973. Many Banyamulenge initially joined the Simba Rebellion of 1964 and 1965 but switched sides when the rebels, fleeing both Jean Schramme's mercenaries and government troops, came onto the plateau and began to end the rebellion. The Tutsi rose, accepted weapons from the pro-Mobutu forces and assisted in defeating the remaining rebels. Because many of the rebels who were killed were from the neighbouring Bembe people, the existing tensions were worsened. The Bembe felt that the Bayamulenge were overstaying their welcome and discriminating against their neighbours, who had allowed them to graze their cattle. Also, they had been brought predominantly by colonialists and forced onto their lands. The government rewarded the Banyamulenge's efforts by appointing individuals to high positions in the capital Bukavu, and their children were increasingly sent to missionary schools. Lemarchand asserts: "From a primarily rural, isolated, backward community, the Banyamulenge would soon become increasingly aware of themselves as a political force".

After the war, the group took advantage of a favourable political environment to expand their territory. Some moved south towards Moba Port and Kalemi, and others moved onto the Ruzizi Plain, where a few became chiefs among the Barundi through gifts of cattle. Still others went to work in the Bukavu, the provincial capital, or Uvira, a town experiencing a gold rush economic boom. The urban dwellers could make a fair living selling meat and milk from their herds to the gold diggers though the group lacked the political connections to Kinshasa or a large educated class, which was possessed by the North Kivu Banyarwanda.

The pastoralists were located within three territories: Mwenga, inhabited by the Lega people; Fizi of the Bembe people, the Babwari people and the Banyindu people; and Uvira, inhabited by the Vira people, Bafuliro and Barundi. Ethnic tensions against the Tutsi rose after the end of the colonial period, as well as during the mass killings in 1972 of Hutu in Burundi. In response, the Tutsi appear to have attempted to distance themselves from their ethnicity as Rwandans and lay claim to a territorial identity as residents of Mulenge. As they moved, they continued that practice. Some Tutsi Banyarwanda in South Kivu call themselves the Banya-tulambo and Banya-minembwe, after the places in which they were located.

== Political tensions (1971–1992) ==
After 1971, such practices became increasingly controversial. The 1971 Citizenship Decree by President Mobutu Sese Seko granted citizenship to the Banyarwanda who had arrived as refugees from 1959 to 1963. However, some leaders, such as Chief of Staff Barthélémy Bisengimana, were concerned that the change was an alarming sign of the growing influence of the Banyarwanda in the administration.

In reaction to the apparently growing influence of the Banyamulenge, the majority ethnicities, particularly the Nande and Hunde of North Kivu, focused on dominating the 1977 legislative elections. Once that had been accomplished, they passed the 1981 Citizenship Bill, stating that only people who could prove descent from someone resident in Congo in 1885 would qualify for citizenship. From the perspective of the so-called "indigenous ethnicities", such as the Babembe, Bafuliro, the name "Banyamulenge" was a claim to indigeneity in Mulenge.

However, the bill proved difficult to implement by the time of the 1985 provincial assembly elections and so the so-called "indigenous Kivutian majority" came up with an ad hoc measure: Banyarwanda (including Banyamulenge and Tutsi from North Kivu) were allowed to vote in elections but not to run for political office. That appeared to aggravate the situation, as the Banyarwanda who qualified as citizens under the 1981 law still found their political rights curtailed. Some so-called Banyarwanda, particularly Banyamulenge, smashed ballot boxes in protest. Others formed Umoja, an organization of all Congolese Banyarwanda. However, in 1988, the increasing tensions in the Banyarwanda community of North Kivu led to the division of the organization into Tutsi and Hutu groups in North Kivu since the Hutus controlled Rwanda.

The 1991 Sovereign National Conference (CNS) was a sign of the increasing coherence of the anti-Mobutu forces, and came as the Congolese Banyarwanda were in a state of heightened tension. After the beginning of the Rwandan Civil War in 1990, many young Tutsi men in Kivu crossed the border to join the Tutsi-dominated rebel Rwandan Patriotic Front (RPF) in its fight against the Hutu-dominated Rwandan government. In response, the Mobutu government implemented Mission d'Identification de Zaïrois au Kivu to identify non-Zairean Banyarwanda by using the 1885 end of the Berlin Conference as the cutoff. Many Banyarwanda whose families had come as colonial labourers were classified as aliens, which resulted in yet more youth joining the RPF. The overall effect of the CNS was to strengthen the tendency of "indigenous" Congolese to differentiate Tutsis from Hutus and thus lump together all Tutsi Banyarwanda as "Banyamulenge". It also underlined the fragility of their political position to the Banyamulenge. Within the Banyarwanda in the Kivus, the Hutu began defining themselves as "indigenous" compared to the Tutsis, who were increasingly seen as owing their allegiance to the foreign groups.

== Conflict (1993–1998) ==
In 1993, the issue of land and indigenous claims in the Kivus erupted into bloody conflict. Hutu and some Tutsi landlords began buying the lands of poor Hutu and Bahunde of the Wanyanga chiefdom in Masisi, North Kivu. After they had been displaced, 1000 people went to Walikale to demand the right to elect their own ethnic leaders. The Banyanga, insisting that only "indigenous people" could claim that customary right, began fighting the Hutu.

The 1000 people returned to Masisi, where the Hutu landlords and Banyarwanda in general supported the claim of Banyarwanda to "indigenous" rights. The government sent in the Division Spéciale Présidentielle (DSP) and the Guarde Civile to restore order. Ill-supplied, the security forces were forced to live off the local population: the DSP off the rich Hutu and the Guarde Civile off the Bahunde and ordinary Hutus. The DSP appeared to be protecting the rights of the "non-indigenous" (primarily Hutus) against the "indigenous" (primarily Bahunde), sparking outrage and increasing the scope of the conflict. One estimate is that between 10,000 and 20,000 people were killed; another 200,000 people were forced to flee their homes.

In late 1993, about 50,000 Burundian refugees from the Burundi Civil War began streaming into primarily South Kivu. They were followed the next year by almost one million mostly Hutu refugees from the Rwandan genocide, which created the Great Lakes refugee crisis. The Hutu government that was responsible for the genocide came with the refugees and turned the camps into armed bases from which they could launch attacks against the newly-victorious RPF government in Rwanda. The influx of refugees dramatically changed the situation of the Banyamulenge.

The Congolese Tutsis in North Kivu were threatened by the new armed Hutu camps, and the newly established Tutsi government in Rwanda gave them a safe place to go. Their peril was underlined by a commission led by Gustave Vangu Mambweni, who declared that all Banyarwanda were refugees and must return to Rwanda. In April 1995, Anzuluni Mbembe, the co-speaker of the Parliament of Congo, signed a resolution stating that all Banyamulenge were recent refugees (regardless of how long they had lived in the Congo) and providing a list of Banyamulenge who would be expelled from the country. Between March and May 1996, the remaining Tutsi in Masisi and Rutshuru were identified and expelled into refugee camps in Gisenyi. The Bahunde, forced out by the Hutu, also took refuge there.

The situation in South Kivu took longer to develop. Since the 1994 refugees arrived, local authorities began appropriating Banyamulenge-owned property in the valley with the support of Mbembe. Threatened by both the armed Hutus to the north and the Congolese Army appropriating property and land, the Banyamulenge of South Kivu sought cross-border training and supply of arms from the RPF. As threats proliferated, each Native Authority formed its own militia. Finally, in November 1996, the RPF-backed Alliance of Democratic Forces for the Liberation of Congo (AFDL), which the Banyamulenge militias joined, crossed the border and dismantled the camps, before it continued to Kinshasa and overthrew Mobutu. The ranks of the AFDL were composed in large part by the Banyamulenge, who filled most of the administrative positions in South Kivu after the fall of Bukavu.

As documented in the DRC Mapping Exercise Report by the United Nations Office of the High Commissioner for Human Rights, the success of the invasion led to revenge killings by the Tutsi Banyarwanda against their opponents. Perhaps 6000 Hutu were purged in the week after the AFDL had captured the town. It was worse in South Kivu, as Banyamulenge settled local scores and RPF soldiers appeared to conflate the génocidaires with the Hutu with the "indigenous" Congolese. One intellectual in Bukavu who was otherwise sympathetic to the Banyamulenge claim to citizenship stated:

The Banyamulenge conquered their rights by arms but the rift between them and the local population has grown. The attitude of the Tutsi soldiers—during and after the war has made them more detested by the population due to the killings, torture. For example, they will go into the village, raid all the cattle, tell the population—since when have you learned to keep cattle; we are cattle; we know cattle. In Bukavu, they went into and stole from houses. Not so much in Goma. The result is the population is increasingly getting concerned over the question of the Tutsi presence.

== Second Congo War (1998–2003) ==
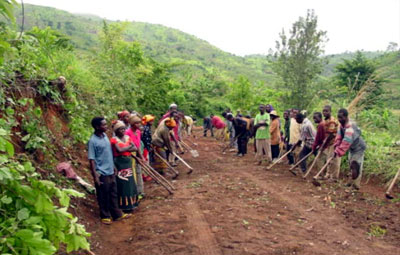
Mixed group of Banyamulenge and Bafuliru repairing a road between Lemera and Mulenge, South Kivu, c. 2003

The situation became more polarised with the beginning of the Second Congo War in 1998. Those who had carried out the massacres of Hutus became part of the ruling military forces in the Kivus. Meanwhile, the Congolese government of Laurent Kabila urged the "indigenous" population to fight not only the invading Rwandan Patriotic Army (RPA) but also the Congolese Tutsi civilians, most of those affected being Banyamulenge. Matching actions to words, Kabila armed "indigenous" militias Mai-Mai and Congolese Hutu militias, as well as the génocidaires (those who carried out mass killings during and after the 1994 Rwandan genocide in which nearly a million Rwandans, primarily Tutsis, were killed by their Hutu neighbours) in response to the RPF's supplying arms to the Banyamulenge. The two Mai-Mai groups that were the most active against the Banyamulenge were the Babembe and the Balega militias.

The various Banyamulenge militias and the Rwandan government forces separated because of disagreements over motives of the uprising after the creation of RCD-Goma. In early 2002, extensive fighting took place on the high plateau of South Kivu after Commandant Patrick Masunzu, then a Tutsi officer in the Rwandan-backed Rally for Congolese Democracy-Goma (RCD-Goma) rebel movement, gathered Banyamulenge support in an uprising against the RCD-Goma leadership.

By 2000, the Banyamulenge were hemmed into the high plateau by Congolese Mai-Mai, the Burundian Forces for the Defense of Democracy and the Rwandan Hutu Armée de Libération du Rwanda (ALiR). They were unable to carry out basic economic activities without the security provided through the RCD-Goma. Numerous families fled to the relative safety of the Burundian capital, Bujumbura. Nevertheless, the Banyamulenge made up much of the RCD military wing, the Armée Nationale Congolaise (ANC), and controlled the towns of Fizi, Uvira and Minembwe, which had been recently declared a "commune" among many others in 2018.

In August 2004, 166 Banyamulenge refugees were massacred at a refugee camp in Gatumba, Burundi, by a force that was mostly National Forces of Liberation rebels. Vice-President Azarias Ruberwa, a Munyamulenge, suspended his participation in the transitional government for one week in protest before he was persuaded to return to Kinshasa by pressure from South Africa.

== M23 War and present (2012–2025) ==
Many Banyamulenge were opposed to the M23 Rebel Movement. Most Banyamulenge opposed Rwandan support of the rebellious M23 led by Tutsi from the North Kivu province although many Banyamulenge living in Rwanda as refugees or Rwandan citizens benefited from the government of Rwanda. Some of them even occupy government posts and others can be found in lucrative private sectors, and others seek residence as refugees and benefit from the US government resettlement program to relocate to the United States, which has a flourishing Banyamulenge diaspora. In the Democratic Republic of Congo, the Banyamulenge have been part of the elite community in politics and the military and benefit from Kabila himself even though they were hated by some members of his inner circle. That has led to increased tensions with local communities all over the country, which argue that the groups receives undeserved preferential treatment from the government. That view is largely held by other tribes in South Kivu, which have always maintained that the Banyamulenge are more Rwandan than they are Congolese.

It remains a question of interest as to how they will be treated by the Félix Tshisekedi regime since they have, in one way or the other, been fairly treated and protected under Kabila's leadership. The Congolese identify themselves based on their territories. For example, the Bembe and the Lega tribes identify themselves based on the following territories including Itombwe, Lulenge, Ngandja, Tanganyika and M'tambala. In each territory, the land occupants are well-known regardless of their residence. Though part of Sud Kivu is inhabited, its dwellers know their territories well and the land that belongs to each tribe. In recent years, tensions over the identity of the Banyamulenge and their claims to a newly established district/"commune" (Minembwe) have created a new cycle of regional political and military disagreements, which have led to new ethnic clashes and have involved foreign armed groups.

In late 2019, rising ethnic tensions in South Kivu caused several high-ranking national political and military leaders to journey to Minembwe as an attempt to appease ethnic tensions in the region. In the diaspora, especially in North America and the European Union, a movement protesting violence towards Banyamulenge was created by using social media. International broadcasting channels reported on several demonstrations in the United States and Canada. Despite all of the violence, Banyamulenge have resorted to peaceful strategies to resolve these problems. On 6 January, the community endorsed a judicial inquiry/mission to investigate and bring to justice those responsible for crimes committed against the Banyamulenge in Minembwe.

In 2020, the World Youth Alliance warned that the Banyamulenge people of the Democratic Republic of the Congo "are facing another wave of inhumane emotional and psychological terror and being subjected to genocidal acts of violence. A coalition of local militias has been carrying out killings of Banyamulenge people who have been in a dire humanitarian situation in the central African region for years. In addition, popular politicians, both in the provinces and the capital city Kinshasa have started campaigns whose main goal is to demonize Tutsis, the Banyamulenge community in particular, by denying their inalienable right to Congolese autochthony and scapegoating them for the woes that the country has been through since the 1990s."

== See also ==
- Banyarwanda
