= Joseph Kabila =

President of the DR Congo from 2001 to 2019

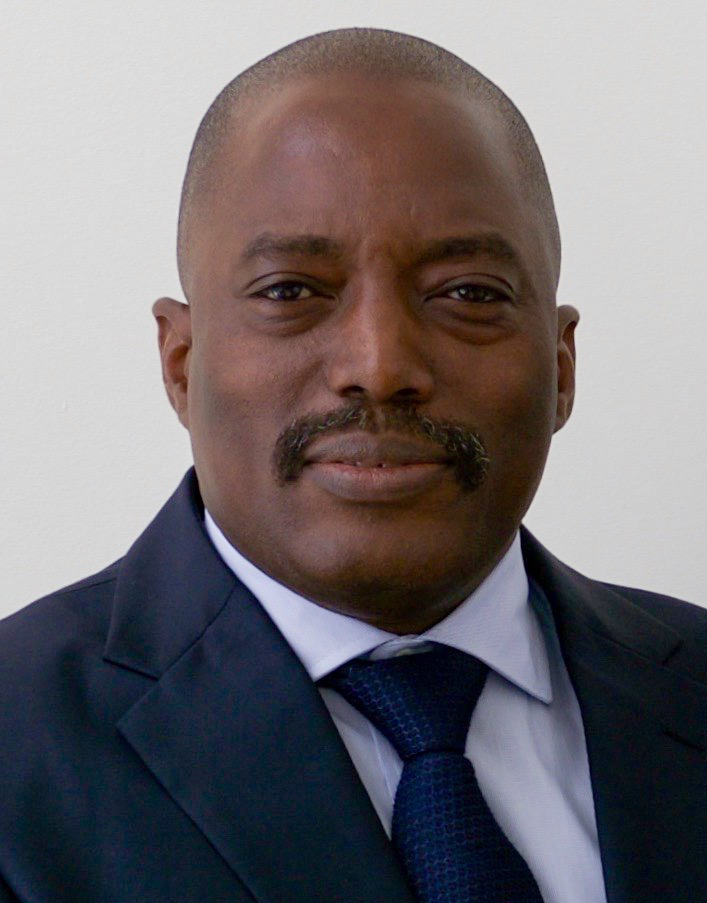
- Kabila in 2016

4th President of the Democratic Republic of the Congo
- In office 17 January 2001 –: 24 January 2019; Acting: 17 January 2001 – 26 January 2001
- Prime Minister: See list: Antoine Gizenga; Adolphe Muzito; Louis Alphonse Koyagialo (acting); Matata Ponyo Mapon; Samy Badibanga; Bruno Tshibala
- Vice President; (2003–2006): See list: Azarias Ruberwa; Arthur Z'ahidi Ngoma; Abdoulaye Yerodia Ndombasi; Jean-Pierre Bemba
- Preceded by: Laurent-Désiré Kabila
- Succeeded by: Félix Tshisekedi

Chairman of the Southern African Development Community
- In office 8 September 2009 – 17 August 2010
- Preceded by: Hifikepunye Pohamba
- Succeeded by: Kgalema Motlanthe

Senator for life
- Incumbent
- Assumed office 15 March 2019

Leader of the Front for the Refoundation of the Nation
- Incumbent
- Assumed office 12 October 2026
- Preceded by: Position established

Personal details
- Born: Joseph Kabila Kabange; 4 June 1971 (age 55) Hewa Bora II, Maquis of Fizi (now South Kivu, DR Congo)
- Party: People's Party for Reconstruction and Democracy
- Spouse: Olive Lembe di Sita (m. 2006)
- Children: 2
- Education: Makerere University; Washington International University; People's Liberation Army National Defense University; University of Johannesburg

Military service
- Allegiance: AFDL; DR Congo
- Branch/service: Land Forces
- Years of service: 1996–1997 (AFDL); 1997–2006 (DRC)
- Rank: Major General
- Commands: Chief of Staff of the Armed Forces; Chief of Staff of the Land Forces
- Battles/wars: First Congo War; Second Congo War

Joseph Kabila Kabange (/kæˈbiːlə/ kab-EE-lə, French: [ʒozɛf kabila]; born 4 June 1971) is a Congolese politician and former military officer who was the fourth president of the Democratic Republic of the Congo from 2001 to 2019. He took office ten days after the assassination of his father, President Laurent-Désiré Kabila, in the context of the Second Congo War. He was allowed to remain in power as the president of the new transitional government after the 2002 peace agreements ended the war. Kabila founded the People's Party for Reconstruction and Democracy (PPRD) and was elected president in 2006. He was re-elected for a second term in 2011. Since stepping down after the 2018 election, Kabila, as a former president, is a senator for life. Kabila was the country's second-longest serving president.

Kabila was born in a village in the present-day South Kivu province of the DRC. His father, Laurent-Désiré Kabila, lived in isolation while leading a dissident movement against the dictator Mobutu Sese Seko. The younger Kabila later received education and military training in Tanzania and Uganda. He studied at Makerere University before the First Congo War broke out in 1996. His father was a founding member of the AFDL movement to overthrow Mobutu with the backing of Rwanda and Uganda. Joseph Kabila participated in the war, which ended with his father becoming the president, and afterwards studied at the PLA National Defense University in China. He was appointed as the deputy chief of staff of the Congolese Armed Forces in 1997, and was briefly the chief of staff in 1998, at the outbreak of the Second Congo War. In 1999, he became the chief of staff of the Land Forces.

After his father's assassination, Kabila succeeded him as the president, and restarted the peace process that had previously stalled. He is credited with ending the Second Congo War and restoring stability to most of the country, though conflict continued in the east against rebel forces supported by neighboring Rwanda and Uganda. He helped organize electoral institutions and presided over the DRC's first free multi-party election in decades. After that Kabila led an increasingly authoritarian government, and his re-election in 2011 was marred with accusations of fraud. During his tenure, he encouraged foreign investment in the mining industry and improved the infrastructure. The size of the country's economy increased by five times. However, the growth was highly unequal, and the majority of the population still lived below the international poverty line by the time he left office. The Kabila administration became known for cronyism, corruption, and human rights violations, including security forces killing protestors. The DRC consistently scored low in the Corruption Perceptions Index and The Economist Democracy Index.

The DRC experienced a political crisis during the last years of Kabila's second term. His constitutional mandate was due to expire in 2016, according to the 2006 constitution. Officials suggested that an election would be held in that year, but it was delayed until early 2018. Kabila's popularity declined and he also faced growing pressure from the international community to give up power. An agreement was reached after mediation by the Catholic hierarchy to appoint a new government and prepare to hold elections, but they were delayed again. In August 2018, Kabila announced that he would step down and not seek a third term in the upcoming election that December. In January 2019, Kabila was succeeded by Félix Tshisekedi in the country's first peaceful transition of power. Independent observers concluded that Tshisikedi lost heavily to another candidate, Martin Fayulu, and that Kabila had fixed the official result for the candidate most likely to be helpful to him.

He remained influential in the DRC's politics after he left office. Kabila's political alliance, the Common Front for Congo, initially held the majority of seats in the parliament, and formed a coalition government in August 2019 with Tshisekedi's Heading for Change alliance after months of negotiations. Tshisekedi ended the coalition in 2020 over the blocking of his agenda. In 2021 he removed the last of Kabila's allies from the government, and in 2023 Kabila went into self-imposed exile abroad. Tshisekedi accused him of supporting the resurgent campaign of the Rwandan-backed M23 movement in 2025, which he denied. A Congolese military court tried Kabila in absentia for treason and sentenced him to death. In 2026, Kabila was sanctioned by the United States, and later that year became the leader of the FRN, a rebel coalition that includes M23.

== Early life and education (1971–1996) ==
Joseph Kabila Kabange and his twin sister Jaynet Kabila were born on 4 June 1971 in Hewa Bora II, a village in the Maquis of Fizi, in the present-day South Kivu Province, DR Congo. They were among the ten children of the long time rebel and politician Laurent-Désiré Kabila and his wife Sifa Mahanya. Kabila was a member of the Luba people, with ancestry in the Katanga Province, while Mahanya was a member of the Bangubangu tribe from the Maniema Province. Kabila had taken part in the Simba rebellion during the 1960s and continued to be the leader of a rebel quasi-state in South Kivu opposed to the dictator Mobutu Sese Seko. Joseph Kabila's childhood coincided with the low point of his father's career, when he was living in isolation while leading a rebel movement, with few records of Kabila's early days. His ancestry later became a matter of controversy, with claims by his opponents that his mother was a Rwandan Tutsi, or that he was a taxi driver from Tanzania and was not a legitimate son of Laurent-Désiré Kabila. No conclusive evidence has ever emerged to prove the claims.

Kabila attended a primary school organized by his father's rebel forces before moving to Tanzania in the late 1970s, where he completed primary and secondary school in Mbeya and Dar es Salaam. Due to his father's status as an enemy of Zairean strongman Mobutu Sese Seko, Kabila posed as a member of the Tanzanian Fipa people in his school years to avoid detection by Zairean intelligence agents. Having been raised outside the DRC, he only spoke English and Swahili fluently when he was young, and by the time he became president he was not fluent in either French, the DRC's official language, or Lingala, a common language in Kinshasa.

== Guerrilla and army years (1996–2001) ==
Following high school, Kabila followed a military curriculum in Tanzania, then at Makerere University in Uganda. In October 1996, Laurent-Désiré Kabila launched the campaign in Zaire to oust the Mobutu regime with his newly formed army, the Alliance of Democratic Forces for the Liberation of Congo-Zaire (AFDL). It occurred as part of a war instigated by Rwanda, Uganda, and Angola, which supported the AFDL's creation to provide Congolese legitimacy for their effort against Mobutu. The Rwandan officer James Kabarebe, who oversaw his training, wanted Joseph Kabila to take part in the AFDL campaign. He became the commander of an AFDL unit that included "kadogos" (child soldiers) and likely played a key role in major battles on the road to Kinshasa, but his exact whereabouts during the war have been difficult to establish. Joseph Kabila appears to have been present at the liberation of Kisangani where media reports identified him as commander of the rebel force that took the city after four days of intense fighting. At Kisangani, he described himself the "operational commander of the northern sector" of the AFDL. With much assistance by foreign troops, the AFDL waged a lightning war that led to the collapse of Mobutu's Zairean Armed Forces (FAZ). Laurent-Désiré Kabila declared himself president in May 1997 and restored the country's original name. His government received widespread international recognition.

Following the AFDL's victory, Kabarabe appointed Joseph Kabila as deputy chief of staff for administration and operations of the Congolese Armed Forces (FAC), which was established as the national military by his father. He went on to get further training at the PLA National Defense University, in Beijing, China, starting in June 1998. At some point Kabila also obtained a bachelor's degree in international studies and diplomacy from Washington International University by distance learning. He was promoted to the rank of major general. The outbreak of the Second Congo War occurred after a falling out between the Kabila government and its former allies during 1998 over the Hutu insurgency and control of resources. The younger Kabila served under James Kabarebe, who had planned the AFDL's military operations and was appointed chief of staff of the FAC after their victory. He formed a strong bond with Joseph Kabila, who, having limited military experience, looked up to Kabarebe. In July 1998, as tensions escalated, Kabarebe was dismissed from his post and returned to Rwanda, where he began planning another invasion of the DRC with Paul Kagame. Joseph Kabila called Kabarebe from China and tried to prevent the outbreak of fighting, but was unsuccessful.

After his return from China, Kabila rose in importance. He was among his father's advisors that were involved in securing Kinshasa early in the war, when Kabarebe's Rwandan forces launched an air assault near the capital and the president fled to Katanga. The attack was stopped by allied Zimbabwean and Angolan troops. The start of the war showed the recently appointed replacement for Kabarebe, Célestin Kifwa, to be incompetent. He was replaced by the younger Kabila, then aged 27, in mid-August 1998. Joseph Kabila led the armed forces only briefly, being replaced on 20 October 1998 by Eddy Kapend. The FAC was in a poor condition, mainly consisting of ex-FAZ soldiers and kadogos, so the Kabila government depended on foreign troops from Zimbabwe, Angola, Namibia, and briefly Chad, who defended the front line and maintained logistics. Hutu fighters from Hutu refugee camps launched offensives against the rebel forces and their Rwandan and Ugandan backers. On 3 September 1999, Joseph Kabila became the chief of staff of the Land Forces. He was still in that post as of December 2000.

== Presidency (2001–2019) ==
=== Second Congo War negotiations ===
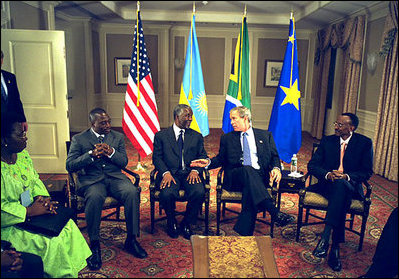
Kabila (left) in New York City in 2002, with Thabo Mbeki, George W. Bush, and Paul Kagame

Joseph Kabila was inaugurated as president of the Democratic Republic of the Congo on 26 January 2001, ten days after the assassination of his father. He became the interim president on 17 January, and it was formally announced on 18 January. At 29 years old, he was considered young and inexperienced, and reportedly did not want to become the president, but was the only candidate that his father's advisers could agree on. He was a relatively unknown figure when he assumed office, and not even his exact age was known.

Kabila inherited a country on the verge of economic and political collapse after years of war and several million deaths, with Rwandan and Ugandan troops occupying the east, and his government in the west dependent on troops from Zimbabwe, Angola, and Namibia. The rebel groups had demands, and the civilian opposition wanted a democratic government. In his inauguration speech, Joseph Kabila spoke about the need to "restore peace and national communion," restart the negotiations that stalled under his predecessor, return to democracy, and liberalize the economy. A week after taking office he visited Washington, D.C., Paris, and Brussels, to raise support and increase his international and domestic legitimacy. While in the United States, he met with Rwandan president Paul Kagame to discuss the war. During his trip he also promised reforms, including the opening up of the DRC's mining sector to foreign investment, which was seen positively by the IMF, the World Bank, and the European Union.

On 15 February 2001, Kabila revived the Lusaka Peace Agreement, which had been signed by his father in 1999 but never implemented, and facilitated the deployment of MONUC, a UN military observer mission for Congo. The deployment began in March, and as a show good will, Rwanda and Uganda pulled back their troops. In May 2001 he lifted his father's previous ban on political parties in the DRC. The small base of support that Kabila inherited, mostly Katangans and family members, became divided over the peace process, and he removed cabinet ministers who opposed it. Lacking a reliable army or political base, Kabila initially relied on foreign troops from Zimbabwe and Angola, who provided security in Kinshasa when the Congolese forces were disarmed and confined to their barracks after the assassination of his father Laurent-Désiré. He engaged in the inter-Congolese dialogue with rebel groups, leading to the Sun City Agreement in April 2002, which confirmed that Kabila would remain as president and laid out the structure of the political transition, but was only partially accepted.

After further talks under international pressure, particularly from South Africa, the Global and All-Inclusive Agreement (AGI) was signed on 17 December 2002 by Kabila's government, the Rwandan-backed Rally for Congolese Democracy (RCD), the Ugandan-backed Movement for the Liberation of the Congo (MLC), and the pro-Kabila Mai-Mai tribal militias. Separate treaties were signed by the DRC with Rwanda and Uganda in July (Pretoria Accord) and September 2002 (Luanda Agreement), respectively, for their withdrawal, and for the DRC to disband the ethnic Hutu forces in its army. Kabila signed both agreements as the head of state of the DRC, without any involvement by the rebel leaders, which strengthened his position. The December 2002 AGI intended to end the war, reunify the country, and create a transitional government to draft a new constitution, organize elections within three years, and rebuild the national army. The power-sharing deal divided control over state institutions and distributed seats in the parliament among the different factions and parties.

=== Transitional Government ===
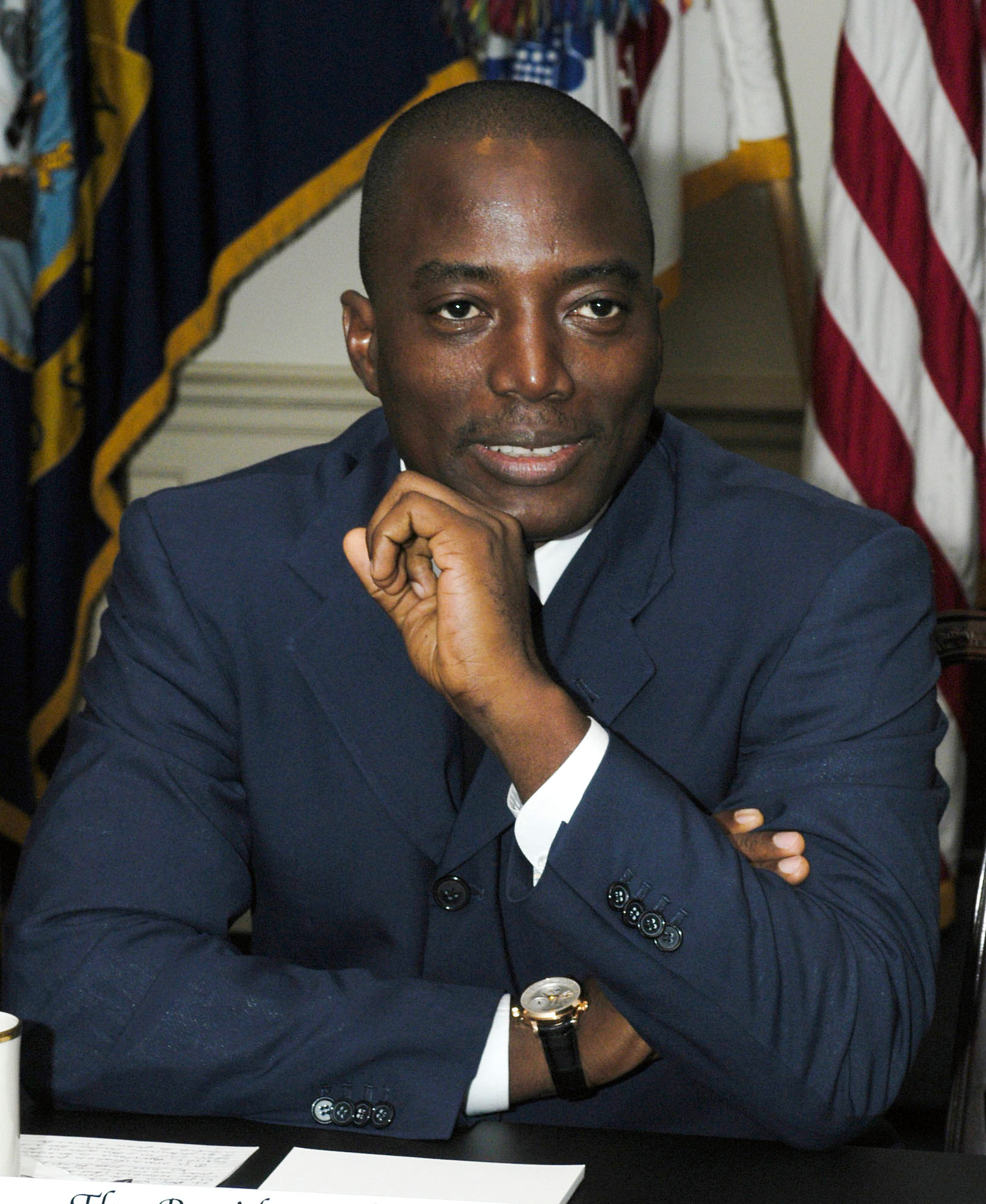
Kabila at the Pentagon in 2003

The implementation of the peace agreement was overseen by foreign representatives and the largest UN peacekeeping mission in history. The transitional government was led by Kabila and four vice presidents, including one each from two rebel groups, RCD–Goma and the MLC, one from Kabila's government, and one from the unarmed opposition. A transitional constitution was completed in March 2003. On 7 April 2003 Kabila was sworn in as the transitional president. The new cabinet was sworn in on 30 June 2003, and the Senate and the National Assembly were set up in July 2003. In October 2004 the Nationality Act was enacted, granting citizenship to members of every ethnicity that was living in Congo at independence, to ensure that the citizenship of Banyamulenge was no longer challenged. The Independent Election Commission (CEI) was established in November 2004. A constitutional commission appointed by Kabila finalized the draft of the constitution in October 2004, and it was passed by the National Assembly in his presence on 16 May 2005. It established a unitary state, though one with significant decentralization for its 25 provinces and the city of Kinshasa, and a semi-presidential system, with a president elected by universal suffrage and a prime minister appointed by the president with the support of the parliament. It also created an independent judiciary, including a Constitutional Court with significant powers.

Despite the foreign support for the transition, it experienced several threats. In March 2004, several military barracks in Kinshasa were attacked, allegedly by elements of Mobutu Sese Seko's old presidential guard, who had fled to the Republic of the Congo when the AFDL captured the capital in 1997. On 11 June 2004, there was a coup attempt led by Major Eric Lenge, of Kabila's own presidential guard. The plotters occupied a national radio station and read a statement claiming that the transitional government has been dissolved. After being pursued by government forces, they fled to the Bas Kongo province, where they vanished. It was alleged, but not proven, that the coup attempt had been organized by hardline elements in the Kabila administration. There were also street protests and violence in Kinshasa directed against the transitional government during 2004 due to its inability to reestablish full control over the eastern DRC.

Because there was still no constitution or electoral law at the start of 2005, the election was postponed, leading to large protests in Kinshasa. This, combined with delays in appointments to public companies and the removal of two MLC ministers, caused a rift between Kabila and Vice President Jean-Pierre Bemba of the MLC, who threatened to end his support for the transitional government. However, a conversation between him and Kabila ended the dispute and allowed the election to be pushed back. Étienne Tshisekedi and his Union for Democracy and Social Progress (UDPS), the historic opposition, criticized the delay and declared that the transitional government would end in late June. Newspapers in Kinshasa spoke of a Ukrainian scenario, but a demonstration by UDPS in July was blocked by police, and overall the country remained calm.

The effort to create a unified national army, the Armed Forces of the Democratic Republic of the Congo (FARDC), was delayed by years. The Hutu fighters from Rwanda and Burundi had been the most important element of Kabila's army, and demobilizing them, as Paul Kagame demanded, became a major problem. The peace agreement divided control of military institutions among different factions―the general staff and the air force to Kabila, the land forces and defense ministry to the RCD, and the navy to the MLC. A general staff and ten military region commands were established in 2003. Kabila built a separate Republican Guard that was better paid and equipped than the regular FARDC and was under his direct command. He also created his own maison militaire ("military household") that existed as a parallel command structure to the FARDC general staff. As of August 2004, it was said that the integrated Congolese army existed only on paper. The majority of the troops remained loyal to their previous faction, either a rebel group or the pre-transition government. In May 2005 it was announced that eighteen integrated brigades would be created before the election, but only three brigades were completed by then, and the army remained in a state of disorder.

=== Elections ===
==== Referendum and general election, 2005–2006 ====
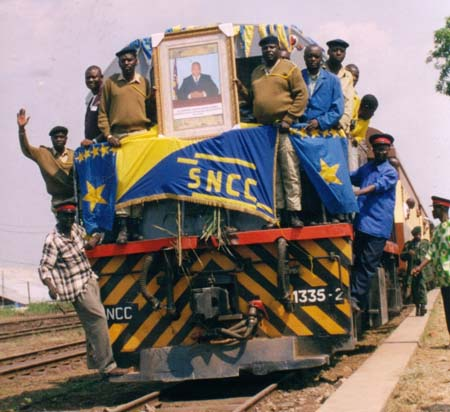
The ceremonial first train on the newly reconstructed Lubumbashi–Kindu railway in 2004, bearing Kabila's portrait

The transition period leading up to the DRC's first free and fair election in over four decades, since the general election of May 1960, was delayed and lasted three and a half years. In November 2001 Kabila stated he was committed to holding truly free and fair democratic elections. In early 2003 he established the People's Party for Reconstruction and Democracy (PPRD), which was closely connected with the state. The party was described as a political vehicle for Kabila in the election. His visit to the eastern city of Kisangani in October 2004 was the start of his election campaign. He pledged to hold an election next year. The Economist wrote that Kabila's civilian opposition was divided, and the former rebel leaders were hated by many because of the war. His leading opponent, Vice President Jean-Pierre Bemba, the head of the MLC, was under investigation by the International Criminal Court for war crimes committed by his troops.

During the campaign, Kabila was criticized for his poor command of Lingala, one of the main languages in the western DRC, and allegations that he gave mining contracts to foreign companies that were exploitative for the country. He was also attacked by his opponents with claims that he was Tanzanian or Rwandan. The latter was particularly damaging in a country that was recently invaded by Rwanda. Bemba and the others emphasized their Congolese identity. The Kabila campaign made use of the allegations that Bemba's troops committed war crimes. Kabila had an election program called Cinq Chantiers (Five Construction Sites), which was his strategy to develop the country by focusing on five sectors: infrastructure, job creation, education, water, and electricity and health. He also got married during the election season, and his wife, Olive Lembe di Sita, campaigned for him in the western DRC, where his support was the weakest.

The government faced significant logistical challenges, having to set up 40,000 polling centers and train 200,000 election workers, and to ascertain the number of eligible voters, in a vast country with little or no infrastructure. The CEI was able to register 25 million voters between June and December 2005, despite the lack of infrastructure, population registers, or ID cards, and some parties calling a boycott of the election. The registration was completed in time for the constitutional referendum held in December 2005, in which the draft constitution was approved by 84% of the voters, with 62% voter turnout. The approval was the highest in the war-torn east, and in Katanga. The constitution of the Third Republic was promulgated by Kabila on 18 February 2006, and that same month the date for the first round of the general election was set for that summer. Because the law prohibited military service members from running, Kabila resigned his officer's commission on 15 March, and registered his candidacy on 23 March. Étienne Tshisekedi and the UDPS decided in April 2006 to not run any candidates.

About a dozen people had been killed in violent incidents leading up to the election, and there were cases of intimidation by security forces and by candidates' militias. In spite of this, and some irregularities on election day, domestic and international observers noted that the first round of voting on 30 July 2006 was generally free and fair. Joseph Kabila, who ran as an independent, led with 44.81% of the vote, followed by Jean-Pierre Bemba with 20.03%, and Antoine Gizenga with 13.06%. The rest obtained less than 5%. Kabila dominated in the east, where he was credited with ending the war; Bemba led in the west, and Gizenga won his native Bandundu Province. After the first round, Kabila formed the Alliance of the Presidential Majority (AMP), which in addition to the PPRD included Gizenga's Unified Lumumbist Party (PALU) and Nzanga Mobutu's Union of Mobutist Democrats (UDEMO). Their agreement, forming a majority in the legislature, also made a member of PALU the prime minister. Kabila won the second round on 29 October 2006, with 58.05% of the vote to Bemba's 41.95%. His victory was confirmed by the Supreme Court on 27 November, and he was sworn in for his constitutional term as president on 6 December 2006. The newly elected parliament was installed in January 2007, and the new cabinet took office in February, ending the transitional government.

==== General election, 2011 ====
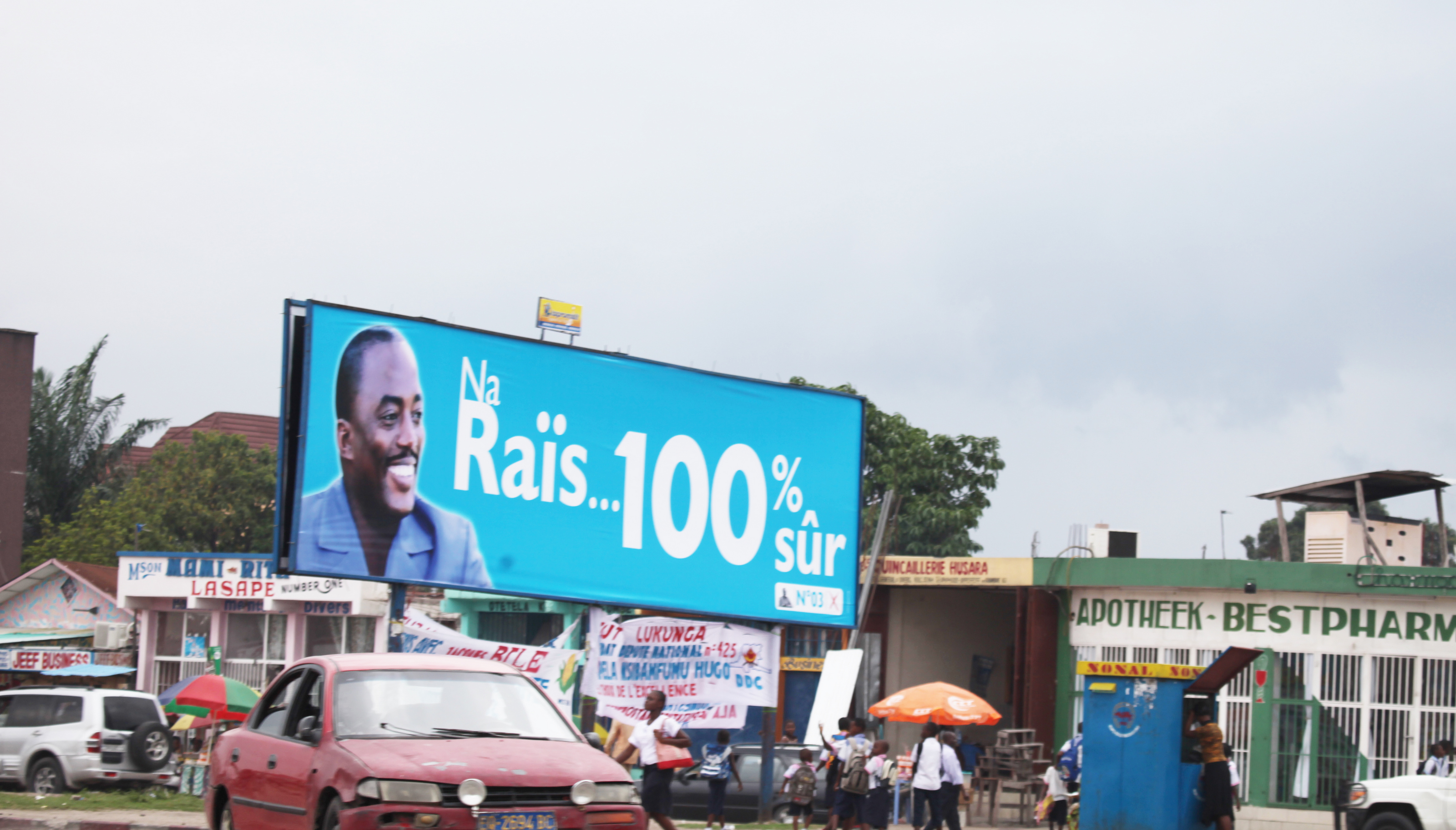
2011 election billboard

During the 2011 election season Kabila had the support of a large network of parties and access to government funds not available to his opposition. He also replaced the CEI, which had been led by a respected Catholic prelate, with the National Independent Election Commission (CENI), led by a founding member of Kabila's PPRD. However, Kabila faced a stronger challenge than previously. Étienne Tshisekedi of the UDPS, a historic opposition leader under Mobutu's regime, ran a strong campaign. Kabila also lost support since 2006. Little progress had been made on the "five pillars" for infrastructure development that he campaigned on, and in 2011 the DRC had the lowest standard of living among the 187 countries rated by the UN. It was also his decision, made under pressure from the United States and the UN, to allow Rwanda todeploy troops into the eastern DRC for operations against militia groups. This led to thousands of deaths and human rights abuses inflicted on the population in the east.

Due to the strength of the opposition, in January 2011, the Alliance of the Presidential Majority passed a constitutional amendment that eliminated two-round elections, so Kabila only needed to obtain a plurality of the votes in one round. Kabila proposed the amendment and it was passed in two weeks. The vote was boycotted by the opposition. Article 71 had anticipated presidential elections to be held in two rounds and was amended to allow a single round, despite the fact that Article 220 of the constitution was intended to prohibit any changes to fundamental aspects of Congolese democracy. CENI refused the request of the UDPS for an independent audit of the voter rolls. After the election campaign officially began on 28 October 2011, television channels did not grant equal access to opposition candidates as they were required to under the constitution. UDPS activists reported being attacked by the police when they were campaigning in Kinshasa.

On election day, 28 November, Kabila led in the presidential vote with 48.95%, followed by Tshisekedi with 32.33%. The official results were announced by CENI on 9 December. The commission sent the provisional results to the Supreme Court on 12 December, and they were confirmed. Several other candidates rejected the result, including Tshisekedi. Observers from the Carter Center reported that returns from almost 2,000 polling stations in areas where support for Tshisekedi was strong had been lost, and that turnout in pro-Kabila Katanga was extremely high. They described the election as lacking credibility. Despite this, Kabila was inaugurated for his second term on 20 December 2011, promising in his speech to improve infrastructure and to revise the DRC's mining code. The US and the EU raised concerns over irregularities, with the US calling for a review. However, they eventually accepted the outcome. Tshisekedi swore himself in as president on 23 December and called on the army to disobey Kabila. Bishops of the Catholic Church, which had deployed 30,000 election observers, denounced the elections in January 2012, complaining of "treachery, lies and terror", and calling on the election commission to correct "serious errors". The government argued that the irregularities were not enough to change the outcome. The dispute led to changes in the composition of CENI, which was signed into law by Kabila in April 2013.

=== Domestic policy ===
==== Governance and security reform ====
Kabila established a largely unified administration and army, and drastically improved security in some regions, in a country that had been divided and occupied by rebels and foreign troops when he took office. He was widely credited with ending the Second Congo War and restoring stability to most of the country. In 2013 the DRC defeated one of the largest Rwandan-backed rebel groups in the east, the March 23 Movement (M23), but dozens of other armed militias remained active. Despite pledging to fight corruption and to develop democracy during the 2006 election, Kabila became increasingly authoritarian, expanding the powers of the presidency over the other branches and curtailing civil liberties. In 2009 he removed Vital Kamerhe as president of the National Assembly, who had encouraged debate in parliament, gave the floor to the opposition, and held hearings into Kabila's controversial minerals agreement with China. His removal ended meaningful work by the parliament. Kabila and his inner circle of family members, supporters, and associates maintained control of the state through patronage networks, and his shadow advisors had more power than even some cabinet officials. However, Kabila failed to win over local elites in the east who had built up their power during the wars, which contributed to the continuing conflicts there. The Kabila administration did not divide the original eleven provinces of the DRC into 26 new provinces, in accordance with decentralization in the constitution, until 2015.

The DRC under Joseph Kabila has been described as being similar to Mobutu's Zaire. Despite some increases in transparency, government corruption remained rampant. During his presidency the DRC continued to score low on the Corruption Perceptions Index and the ease of doing business index. From 2004 to 2017 it remained among the 20 most corrupt countries in the world. The DRC's score in the Ibrahim Index of African Governance between 2007 and 2015 was one of the lowest. The army, built from the pre-transition government forces and integrated rebel groups, was also corrupt and ineffective in its mission of national defense and protecting the population. A group of rebels that was supposed to be integrated into the national army broke away during the 2000s, led by the Rwandan-backed Tutsi warlord Laurent Nkunda, which brought renewed conflict to eastern Congo. He was later arrested, but the M23 Movement that emerged in 2012 consisted of many former Nkunda loyalists. Rebels briefly captured the major city of Goma during the M23 rebellion of 2012–2013 as government forces collapsed, and the DRC had to call on assistance from the UN mission, MONUSCO. Kabila also used the state security forces, including the military and the national intelligence agency (ANR), to suppress protests and his opposition. In November 2008 Human Rights Watch estimated that security forces had killed 500 perceived opponents of Kabila over the previous two years. Kabila gave orders to "crush" or "neutralize" protestors.

In 2006, Kabila responded to evidence of widespread sex crimes committed by the Congolese military by describing the acts as "simply unforgivable". He pointed out that 300 soldiers had been convicted of sex crimes, although he added that this was not enough. In 2009 he announced a zero tolerance policy for sexual violence by security forces, which led to more prosecutions and a notable decrease in complaints. The Kabila administration requested the International Criminal Court investigation into crimes committed in the DRC and sent more suspects to the court than any other government in the world. However, overall, the rule of law in the DRC remained ineffective during his tenure.

==== Economy and development ====
Kabila encouraged foreign investment in the mining industry and improved the infrastructure. The size of the country's economy increased by five times during his presidency. But economic growth slowed down in the later years, and it had been very unequal. The majority of DR Congo's population still lived below the international poverty line by the time he left office. The World Bank approved a debt relief package of US$12.3 billion for the DRC in 2010, and due to the expansion of the mining sector, the DRC experienced some of the highest GDP growth rates in sub-Saharan Africa, averaging 6.6% annually from 2005 to 2015. Inflation was reduced, and the exchange rate of the Congolese franc stabilized. However, there was little improvement in public welfare overall. The Gini coefficient for the DRC, the measure of income inequality, increased between 2005 and 2012. Researcher Jason Stearns has described the DRC as a rentier state in which the government spends the majority of its revenue, which it receives mainly from the mining sector, on itself.

In 2001 the early Kabila administration promised to investigate mining contracts that the DRC had entered into since the 1990s, during which time foreign companies took advantage of the country's difficult situation and engaged in what amounted to asset-stripping of Congolese state-owned mining companies. In 2002 and 2003 the Kabila administration prepared the DRC's mining code. The World Bank contributed to its creation, and it was intended to induce foreign companies to assist the Congolese government. The result was a code that allowed them to pay very low taxes and contribute relatively little to the national budget. Kabila appointed a commission headed by Christophe Lutundula to investigate the most unequal mining contracts. However, it was not until March 2018 that Kabila signed into law a replacement for the 2002 mining code, which drastically increased taxes on certain minerals, despite lobbying efforts by executives from companies such as Glencore and China Molybdenum. Kabila ended the DRC's cooperation with the IMF in 2012, after it made public disclosures of mining contracts a requirement for financial assistance.

Between the early 2000s and 2012, there was a rapid increase in employment in small-scale agriculture and informal jobs, and income levels improved for the poor, though formal employment represented a small portion of the work force, and opportunities for skilled workers were rare. Primary school enrollment increased and some health indicators improved significantly. The wages of civil servants and other state expenses were the largest share of public spending. The government provided almost no social services, though it had public-private partnerships with religious and non-governmental organizations for delivering education and healthcare. Healthcare and infrastructure is still funded by foreign loans and grants. Before 2008, most infrastructure construction was undertaken by development partners, until the DRC entered an agreement with China. The Kabila administration eventually abandoned his "Five Construction Sites" slogan because of how little progress had been made in those fields.

One of the major economic projects of his presidency was the Sicomines (Sino-Congolais des Mines) "resources-for-infrastructure" agreement with China. The deal was negotiated after Kabila was unable to secure funding for his Cinq Chantiers program from Western countries. The DRC signed a memorandum of understanding in September 2007 that granted a consortium owned by the China Railway Engineering Corporation the majority of shares in a joint venture called Sicomines, while the DRC's Gécamines owned the rest. Sicomines would be given mining licenses in the Katanga Province, with CREC agreeing to build infrastructure in exchange, and to secure US$6.5 billion from Chinese banks to finance it. The agreement was controversial because the DRC government guaranteed the loans, assuming the risk instead of the Chinese signatories. After the IMF and civil society groups became concerned about the DRC's ability to repay the loans, negotiations continued and the final deal was signed in 2009. They removed the DRC's guarantee for the mining investment but kept it for the infrastructure investment, which was reduced to US$3 billion. Sicomines was exempt from paying taxes in the DRC until the loans had been repaid. Kabila, who negotiated the deal along with his advisors, was criticized by the Congolese opposition and civil society groups, including for the lack of transparency during negotiations and for the terms disproportionately favoring China. It caused a national debate on balancing sovereignty and development.

=== Foreign policy ===
==== Europe and the United States ====
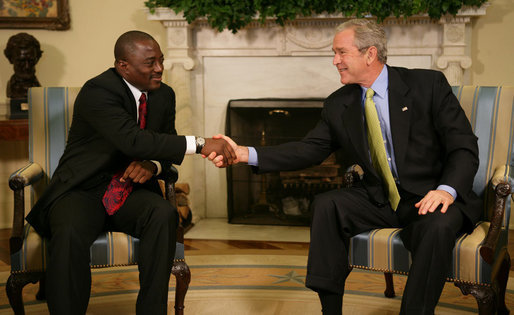
Kabila with George W. Bush in 2007

When he assumed office, Joseph Kabila worked to establish better relations with foreign powers, including neighboring countries as well as Europe and the United States. The Guardian called Kabila the "new young darling of the West." The George W. Bush administration was evenhanded during the negotiations to end the Second Congo War, after the administration of Bill Clinton had tolerated Rwanda's invasion of the DRC in the 1990s. The European Union became the largest external sponsor of the DRC, spending over half a billion dollars on the 2006 election, to foster democracy and reform. This also included the deployment of the European Union Force (EUFOR) to assist the UN mission, MONUC, with security during the election. The EU largely scaled back its involvement in the DRC from 2007. It had a significant role in the security sector reform in the DRC, at the request of Kabila, with two training and advisory missions: EUSEC for the FARDC, and EUPOL for the Congolese National Police (PNC). The United States initially provided the DRC with humanitarian aid. Later, the United States became an arms supplier to the DRC, along with France, Belarus, Serbia, and Ukraine. During his first term, Western partners were concerned about his deviation from "good governance" commitments, and his minerals agreement with China.

The DRC's relations with the EU and the US became strained during Kabila's second term, mainly over human rights and the question of whether Kabila would respect the constitutional term limit. In October 2012, during the 14th Francophonie annual summit held in Kinshasa, French and Canadian officials criticized the "lack of democracy" in the DRC and its poor human rights record. President François Hollande also met with Tshisekedi, the opposition leader. In May 2014 US Secretary of State John Kerry asked Kabila to not seek a third term in office. During 2016, the US and the EU sanctioned a number of officials in Kabila's government for their role in his effort to extend his term in office, and for the killing of anti-government protestors by security forces. During 2017 several more senior officials were sanctioned.

==== Africa ====
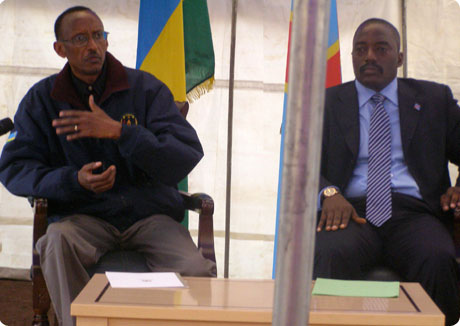
Kabila with Paul Kagame at the border near Goma in 2009

The peace negotiations that ended the Second Congo War took place under pressure from South Africa. President Thabo Mbeki had a leading role in the process and was present with Kabila when the DRC's parliament adopted the constitution of the Third Republic in May 2005. South Africa has been described as the closest ally of the Kabila administration, in part because of the personal relationships between Kabila and South African presidents, and business interests. Among Kabila's networks of supporters, the most powerful, consisting of ethnic Katangans, was well connected with South African and Zimbabwean partners who ran mining operations in Katanga and the Kasaï region. South Africa was the largest exporter to the DRC, one of the largest donors of development aid, and has provided peacekeepers for MONUSCO. It was also among the countries that trained the integrated Congolese army.

Kabila initially relied on Angola and Zimbabwe for support, and Angola also assisted with military training. He visited Zimbabwe in November 2009 in his capacity as the chairman of the Southern African Development Community (SADC) to be a mediator in its political crisis. The 29th SADC summit of the heads of state and government, held in Kinshasa on 7–8 September 2009, selected Kabila to be the chairman of the organization. He remained the chairman until the 30th summit in Namibia on 16–17 August 2010. Robert Mugabe of Zimbabwe was the only foreign leader to attend Kabila's inauguration after his re-election in 2011. Towards the end of his second term he faced pressure from Angola and SADC to not seek another term, and by the end of 2017, Kabila had lost his two major allies in Africa, when Mugabe and South African president Jacob Zuma were replaced. He also had other allies, presidents Pierre Nkurunziza of Burundi and John Magufuli of Tanzania.

In August 2009 Kabila held a meeting with Paul Kagame, the first official summit between the heads of state of Rwanda and the DRC since the two countries broke off diplomatic relations in 1996. They discussed restoring relations and increasing cooperation. In 2008, Kabila had allowed Rwandan troops to participate in joint operations with the Congolese army against the FDLR and the rebel leader Laurent Nkunda, a previously Rwandan-backed Tutsi warlord. Nkunda was arrested by Rwandan troops. However, in October 2009, when Rwanda sent troops into the eastern DRC after claiming the UN and the Congolese government had not done enough against the FDLR, he accused Rwanda of using their presence as a pretext to maintain influence over eastern Congo. Kabila also claimed that every time the DRC came close to neutralizing the Hutu rebels, Rwanda sabotaged the process. This ended the brief period of cooperation between Kabila and Kagame.

Kabila's government restored defense cooperation between the DRC and the Central African Republic in June 2003. The DRC deployed 1,000 peacekeepers to the Central African Republic during the civil war in 2014, which they did alongside troops from other African countries as part of the African Union-led mission MISCA. Kabila was asked to keep troops in CAR by French president François Hollande in May 2014.

==== China ====
China invested heavily in the DRC during the presidency of Joseph Kabila, who awarded dozens of mining contracts to Chinese state-linked companies. The Sicomines agreement in 2007 marked the first time that China became a major partner of the DRC and was the largest deal of its kind in the Congo's history. By the end of his term, the majority of foreign-owned cobalt, copper, and uranium mines in the DRC were owned by Chinese companies. Furthermore, China became the only Asian country involved in the DRC's military reform. Its contributions included training two brigades of the FARDC and supplying military equipment.

=== Constitutional crisis and end of presidency ===
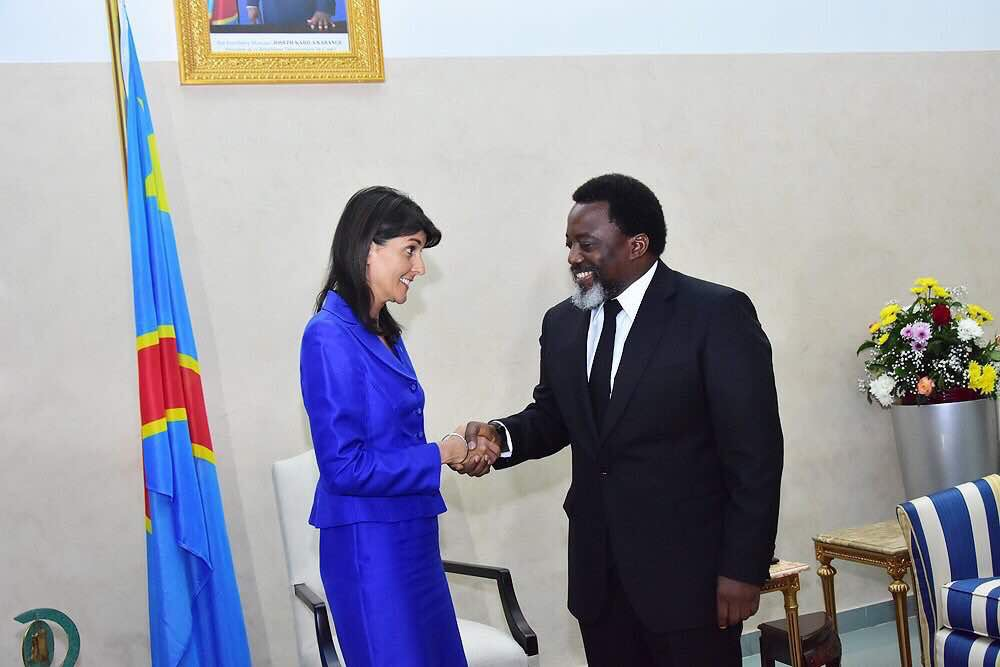
Kabila with Nikki Haley, US ambassador to the UN, in 2017

From 2014 the main political issue in the country was whether Kabila would step down at the end of his last term under the constitution. Kabila's constitutional mandate was due to expire on 20 December 2016, and the next general election was initially planned to be held in November 2016. Article 220 of the DRC's constitution prohibits any changes to vital elements of Congolese democracy, including the length and number of presidential terms, creating a two-term limit of five years each. Because of the widespread belief that a third term is unconstitutional, the term glissement (sliding) was used to describe the allowing of Kabila's second term to "slide" under various pretexts. In January 2015 the parliament attempted to change the electoral law to extend his tenure until a national census was held, which led to mass protests, and security forces responded with violence. At least 38 protestors were killed in Kinshasa and five in Goma. The country experienced a political crisis over the next two years of Kabila's glissement.

The January 2015 protests contributed to the rise of citizens' movements, which received international support, including from the US embassy in Kinshasa. In response, Kabila's government expanded the anti-riot and surveillance capabilities of the security forces. Repression of protestors and pro-democracy activists increased, with notable arrests taking place in March 2015, September 2015, January 2016, March 2016, and April 2016. Moïse Katumbi, the influential governor of Katanga, announced in October 2015 that he would leave the ruling party due to disagreements over the scheduled election. When Katumbi, now an opposition figure, announced that he was running for president in the next election, his house was surrounded by security forces wanting to arrest him.

In May 2016 the Constitutional Court ruled that Kabila could remain in office until a successor has been elected. In September, dozens of people were killed in Kinshasa during protests against the delay of the upcoming election, but the next month the government announced it will not take place until April 2018. A national dialogue between some of the opposition and the Alliance of the Presidential Majority, mediated by the Episcopal Conference of the Democratic Republic of the Congo (CENCO), took place in the fall of 2016. As a result, it was agreed that Kabila will not seek another term. A "transition government" was formed until the election occurred; opposition politician and UDPS member Samy Badibanga was appointed as prime minister by Kabila. Known as the Saint Sylvester agreement, finalized on 31 December 2016, it called for elections to be held before the end of 2017. However, that year CENI pushed back the election until December 2018. Kabila faced increasing pressure not only domestically, but also from the US and the EU. In March 2017, US Ambassador to the UN Nikki Haley called for a reduction in the size of MONUSCO, accusing Kabila of leading a corrupt government that was unworthy of UN support.

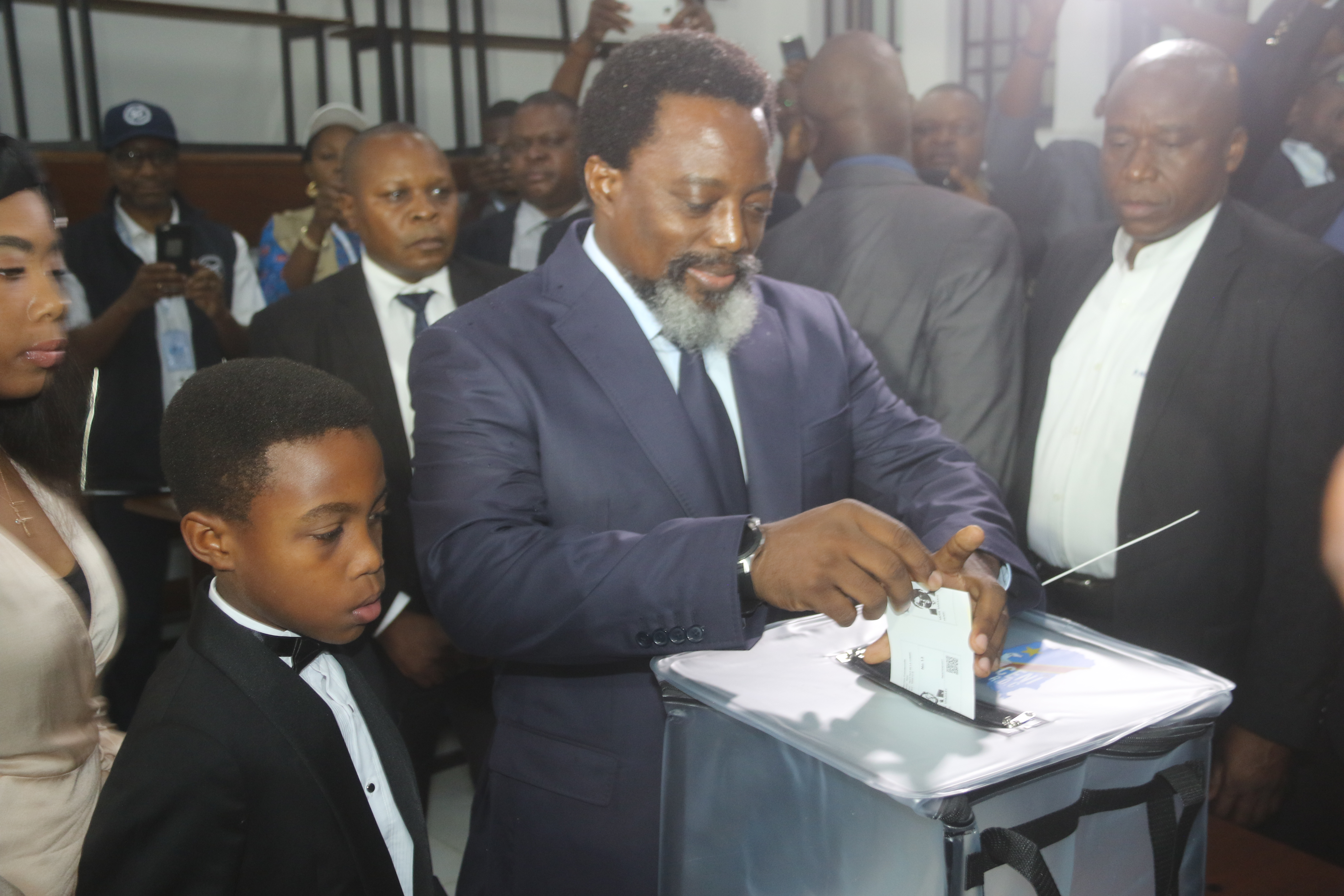
Kabila casting his ballot in the 2018 general elections

On 8 August 2018 Kabila announced that he would not seek another term and planned to step down. The decision was welcomed by the United States, which had recently sanctioned several of Kabila's allies. He also named interior minister Emmanuel Ramazani Shadary as his preferred successor. The PPRD and its new ruling alliance, the Common Front for Congo (FCC), chose Shadary as their presidential candidate for the upcoming election. As Kabila's choice, the dynamic between them was compared to the Medvedev–Putin tandemocracy. However, after the general election was held on 30 December 2018, Félix Tshisekedi was declared the winner, and was inaugurated on 24 January 2019 in the DRC's first peaceful transition of power since independence. An investigation by several media outlets revealed voter fraud and identified another candidate, Martin Fayulu, as the real winner. It is widely believed the election was rigged in a power-sharing deal made by Tshisekedi with Kabila and the FCC. Tshisekedi won the presidency while the FCC was given the majority in the parliament and among provincial governorships. Corneille Nangaa, who was appointed the president of CENI by Kabila and oversaw the 2018 election, later said that Tshisekedi had been made the winner in a deal between him and Kabila.

== Post-presidency (2019–present) ==
Kabila at Tshisekedi's inauguration, 2019

Kabila, as a former president, serves as a senator for life, and after leaving office still had much influence over the DRC's political system. Kabila made Kingakati farm his main residence. The estate, located 50 km east of Kinshasa, was his second home while he was still in power. Because Kabila's FCC was the majority in the parliament, Tshisekedi was unable to form a government for the first seven months of his presidency as negotiations dragged out. In March 2019, a coalition was formed between FCC and Tshisekedi's Heading for Change (CACH) alliance, and Tshisekedi's first cabinet was established in late August 2019. The coalition, which appointed Kabila's close ally Sylvestre Ilunga as prime minister, broke down over tensions in implementing Tshisekedi's agenda. On 6 December 2020, Tshisekedi ended the coalition and formed his own, the Sacred Union of the Nation, and pressured Ilunga to resign in January 2021 with a vote of censure. In April 2021, he succeeded in ousting the last remaining elements of his government who were loyal to Kabila. In May, Tshisekedi called for a review of mining contracts signed with China by his predecessor, especially the Sicomines multibillion 'minerals-for-infrastructure' deal.

In July 2021, Joseph Kabila finished his master's degree, getting the certification from the University of Johannesburg in South Africa. He completed Master's programme in Political Science and International Relations through distance learning. Although he reportedly wanted to run for president again in the 2023 general election, in December 2023 Kabila went into a self-imposed exile, initially to South Africa. He and his wife later lived in Zimbabwe, and he maintained a low profile until late 2024, when the Congolese government began targeting him and his family.

=== Rebel coalition leader ===
In February 2025, Kabila criticised President Tshisekedi for mishandling the resurgence of M23 through poor governance and accused him of seeking to become "absolute ruler of the country" by suppressing political opposition. He joined other prominent figures, including Martin Fayulu, Denis Mukwege, Moïse Katumbi, and the assemblies of Catholic and Protestant bishops in the DRC in calling for a national dialogue to address not just the war in the east, but issues in governing. Tshisekedi accused Kabila of supporting the M23 rebels at the Munich Security Conference that same month. In early March, a cabinet minister in the Tshisekedi administration, Jean-Pierre Bemba, also accused Kabila of supporting M23 and the Congo River Alliance, as well as the Mobondo militia in the western DR Congo clashes. The executive secretary of Kabila's party, the PPRD, denied the accusation. Kabila also denied it. He reportedly met with Moïse Katumbi and other opposition leaders to discuss the political future of the country, and also attended the funeral of Namibian president of Sam Nujoma, where he spoke to foreign leaders. In an interview in Namibia, Kabila compared the situation to the Second Congo War and called for an inclusive peace process in the M23 conflict, and for the withdrawal of foreign troops from Congolese territory.

In April 2025, Kabila returned to the DRC for the first time since his exile to visit the M23-held city of Goma, with an aide saying that he would "participate in peace efforts". The French investigative outlet Africa Intelligence reported that he had been "spotted" in Kigali ahead of an anticipated address to the Congolese public. In response, the Congolese government suspended Kabila's People's Party for Reconstruction and Democracy, citing his "overt" activism, while the Senate voted to lift his parliamentary immunity. The government banned media coverage about Kabila or his party in June. On 30 September 2025, the High Military Court in Kinshasa sentenced Kabila to death for treason, and also found him responsible for war crimes. He was tried and convicted in absentia. Human Rights Watch noted that although his government had been responsible for serious human rights abuses, the way the trial was conducted violated international human rights laws, and resembled a show trial against a political rival. It was criticized by the Catholic bishops' conference and by Kabila's Common Front for Congo.

On 16 October 2025, Kabila appeared at an event in Nairobi, Kenya, alongside several other Congolese opposition politicians. The participants accused Tshisekedi of not addressing the public's needs and forming a "dictatorship". On 30 April 2026, he was sanctioned by the United States for his alleged support for M23, which the U.S. described as a move to support the Washington Accords between the DRC and Rwanda. On 12 October 2026, Kabila announced at his residence in Goma the founding of the Front for the Refoundation of the Nation (FRN), a rebel group incorporating the Congo River Alliance and the M23 Movement. Kabila criticized the Tshisekedi for attempting to change the 2006 constitution. The creation of the FRN was supported by Rwanda; James Kabarebe was the link between Kabila and the Congo River Alliance and M23. Kabila also reportedly tried to assure the United States that the DRC would honor its partnership agreement, which was signed by Tshisekedi earlier that year.

== Personal life ==
Kabila married Olive Lembe di Sita, on 1 June 2006. The wedding ceremonies took place on 17 June 2006. Kabila and his wife have a daughter, born in 2001, named Sifa, after Kabila's mother, and a son born in 2008 named Laurent-Désiré Jr. He owns property outside of Kinshasa, including 71,000 hectares of farmland, and his family fully or partially owns 80 companies across almost every industry in the DRC, including in mining. Kabila's hobbies include watching the NBA, reading, playing PlayStation 4, and driving his motorcycles. He has many animals on his properties, and is also a breeder of cows. When he was young, Kabila liked martial arts and war films.

Kabila has been described as quiet and reserved. Even as the president, he maintained a low profile and was reclusive, spending much of his time at his farm property outside of Kinshasa and rarely granting media interviews.

As Kabila is an Anglican Protestant and Lembe di Sita is Catholic, the wedding ceremonies were ecumenical; they were officiated by both the Catholic Archbishop of Kinshasa, Cardinal Frederic Etsou Bamungwabi, and Pierre Marini Bodho – presiding bishop of the Church of Christ in Congo, the umbrella church for most Protestant denominations in the Congo.

=== Allegations of corruption and ill-gotten wealth ===
In November 2021, judicial authorities in Kinshasa launched a formal investigation into former President Kabila and his close associates, following allegations of the misappropriation of US$138 million in public funds. The inquiry was prompted by a series of revelations that raised serious concerns about the financial conduct of the former administration.

Further scrutiny emerged through a Bloomberg News investigation, which, drawing on leaked banking records, alleged that members of Kabila’s family had received tens of millions of dollars in illicit payments from Chinese firms connected to the Sicomines mining venture. These disclosures formed part of the broader Congo Hold-Up investigation—an extensive leak comprising over 3.5 million internal documents from BGFIBank Group. The leak, initiated by the French investigative outlet Mediapart and the Platform to Protect Whistleblowers in Africa (PPLAAF), included bank statements, emails, contracts, invoices, and corporate records, painting a troubling picture of systemic financial misconduct at the highest levels of power.

== Citations ==
Military offices
Preceded by Célestin Kifwa	Chief of Staff of the Congolese Armed Forces; 1998	Succeeded by Eddy Kapend
Political offices
Preceded by Laurent-Désiré Kabila	President of the Democratic Republic of the Congo; 2001–2019	Succeeded by Félix Tshisekedi
Diplomatic posts
Preceded by Kgalema Motlanthe	Chairman of the Southern African Development Community; 2009–2010	Succeeded by Hifikepunye Pohamba
Party political offices
Office created	Leader of the Front for the Refoundation of the Nation; 2026–present	Incumbent
