= Congolese Banyarwanda =

The term Congolese Banyarwanda refers to Rwandan colonials or nationals who, between the end of World War I and 1960 emigrated to the Democratic Republic of Congo. The term is used to distinguish them from Banyamulenge, people from Tanzania, Rwanda, Burundi and other regions who emigrated during pre-colonial times.

They acquired Congolese citizenship at independence from Belgium on 30 June 1960. The Congolese law on citizenship said that to be Congolese one should be a member of a tribe (ethnic) that was within Congolese boundaries as established at the Berlin Conference in 1885. Congolese Banyarwanda occupied Rutshuru, Masisi, Walikale and Kalehe before 1885. Later they were reaffirmed as citizens in Zaire (now the Democratic Republic of Congo) in 1972 by Mobutu Sese Seko when he needed their support, and subsequently had their citizenship revoked in 1981. This decision was reconfirmed near the end of the Mobutu regime, during 1992's Sovereign National Conference.

The word Banyarwanda simply means "people of Rwandan origin" in Ruanda-Rundi. Before the Berlin Conference in 1885, which divided Africa among the colonial powers, there were no actual borders between modern-day Rwanda and Congo. Additionally, the size of the Banyarwanda grew as Tutsi refugees fled the Rwandan Hutu revolution in 1959-1962. These refugees acquired citizenship through a Mobutu decree dated 1972. When the RPF seized power in Rwanda in 1994 many of these refugees returned to Rwanda.

Additional groups of Banyarwanda that have lived in the Democratic Republic of the Congo include:

- Kinyarwanda-speaking people who were within Congolese boundaries in 1885 before the Berlin Conference and acquired citizenship at independence
- People of Rwandan origin who immigrated to settle in the Democratic Republic of the Congo between 1885 and 1960 and acquired citizenship at independence
- People of Rwandan origin who came to work in the Democratic Republic of the Congo to work in the mines in Katanga, who retained their Rwandan citizenship
- Rwandan refugees who fled to the Democratic Republic of the Congo in 1959-1962, during the Rwandan Revolution. They eventually returned to Rwanda when the RPF took power in Rwanda in 1994
- Rwandan Hutu refugees who fled to the Democratic Republic of the Congo in 1994.
