= Olive Lembe di Sita =

Former First Lady of the Democratic Republic of the Congo

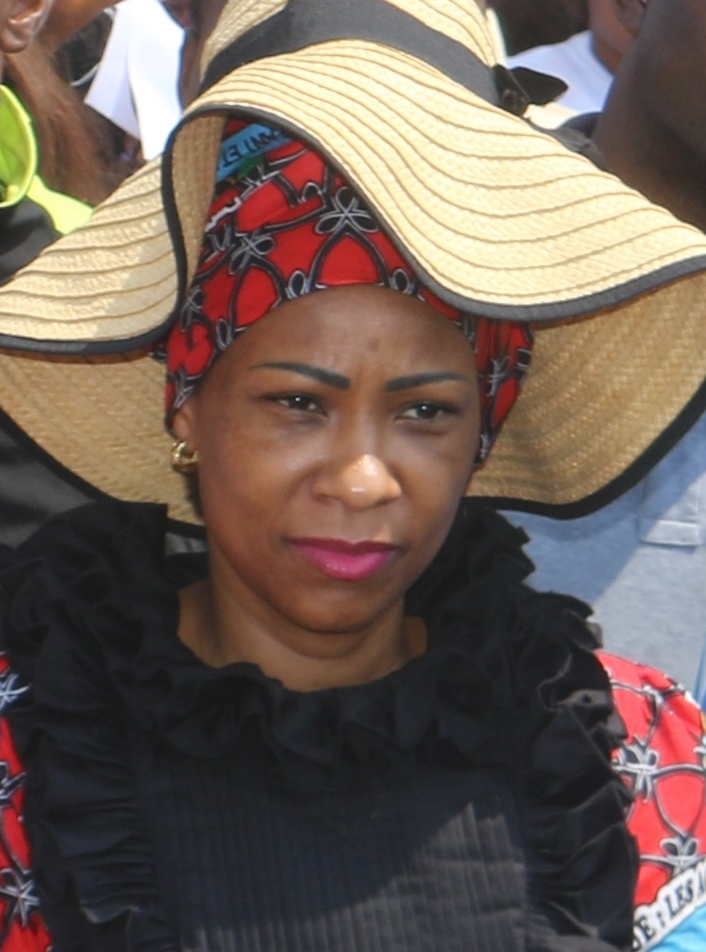

First Lady of the Democratic Republic of the Congo
- In role 1 June 2006 – 24 January 2019
- President: Joseph Kabila
- Preceded by: Sifa Mahanya
- Succeeded by: Denise Tshisekedi

Personal details
- Born: Marie Olive Lembe di Sita; 29 July 1976 (age 49) Kailo, Maniema, Zaire (now Kailo, Democratic Republic of the Congo)
- Spouse: Joseph Kabila (m. 2006)
- Children: Sifa Kabila; Laurent Desire Kabila Jr.

Marie Olive Lembe di Sita (born 29 July 1976) is the former First Lady of the Democratic Republic of the Congo. She was the long-term girlfriend of Congolese President Joseph Kabila whom she married on 1 June 2006, becoming her country's First Lady.

== Personal life ==
On 1 June 2006, the head of the Maison Civile, Theo Mugalu, officially announced the wedding of Lembe di Sita to President Joseph Kabila.

Two different dates emerged, some reports stating 10 June 2007, and other stating 10 June 2006. The wedding eventually took place on 17 June 2006 at the presidential residence in La Gombe, Kinshasa.

As Kabila is Protestant and Lembe di Sita is Catholic, the wedding ceremony was ecumenical, with both Cardinal Frédéric Etsou-Nzabi-Bamungwabi, and Mgr Pierre Marini Bodho of the Church of Christ in Congo, officiating.

In 1998, a daughter was born to the couple, Sifa Kabila, named after Kabila's mother, and former first lady Sifa Mahanya. Then,In 2007, She went to Honor the father of Congolese Gospel Music, Charles Mombaya Massani.
