= Eric Lenge =

Eric Lenge (born 1971) was a major in the Congolese military, specifically in the Special Presidential Security Group. He led a failed coup against the government of Joseph Kabila in the Democratic Republic of the Congo. He had reached the rank of Major in the Special Presidential Security Group, the branch of the Congolese military in charge of Presidential security.

== June 2004 Coup ==
The coup began with a power blackout before taking over Congolese state radio and announcing that he intended to neutralise the transitional support.

The security forces then fought forces loyal to Kabila at the Presidential palace with the loyalists soon gaining the upper hand. Lenge fled the capital with 21 others towards the province of Bas-Congo. As of the middle of 2004, he had not been captured.

Senior members of President Kabila's Government were later dismissed as a result of suspicion in the coup including Presidential adviser Kifua Adamasi, and the Chairman of the Joint Chiefs Of Staff Admiral Liwanga Mata. Former National Security Minister Mwenze Kongolo, a loyalist of former President Laurent Kabila met with Lenge five hours before the start of the coup with Katangese partisans suspected by diplomats of involvement. A failure to pay arrears to the troops was another factor. Some Opposition newspapers believe that the incident was a ploy to consolidate Joseph Kabila in power.

In the first half of 2006, a series of letters purported to be from Major Eric Lenge have been sent to Congolese media groups, all ridiculing President Joseph Kabila's regime, contesting his citizenship, his filiation to Laurent Kabila, and his being unwed.
