= Democratic Republic of the Congo nationality law =

Congolese Nationality Law

Parliament of the Democratic Republic of the Congo
- Long title: Loi No. 04/024 Relative à la Nationalité Congolaise
- Enacted by: Government of the Democratic Republic of the Congo
- Status: Current legislation

In the Democratic Republic of the Congo, nationality law is regulated by the Constitution of the Democratic Republic of the Congo, the Congolese Nationality Code, the Congolese Civil Code, and various international agreements to which the country is a signatory. These laws determine who is, or is eligible to be, a national of the Democratic Republic of the Congo.

The legal means to acquire nationality, formal legal membership in a nation, differ from the domestic relationship of rights and obligations between a national and the nation, known as citizenship.

Congolese nationality is typically obtained under the principle of jus soli, i.e. by birth in the Democratic Republic of the Congo, or jus sanguinis, by birth abroad to parents with Congolese nationality. It can be granted to persons with an affiliation to the country, or to a permanent resident who has lived in the country for a given period of time through naturalization.

== Acquisition of nationality ==
Nationality can be acquired in the Democratic Republic of the Congo at birth or later in life through naturalization. Congolese naturalization is typically granted on the basis of either adoption or choice.

=== By birth ===
Those who acquire nationality at birth include:

- Children born anywhere who have at least one parent who is a Congolese national;
- Children born in the country to parents who are stateless; or
- Abandoned children or orphans discovered in the territory whose parents are unknown.

=== By naturalization ===
Naturalization can be granted to persons who have resided in the territory for a sufficient period of time to confirm they speak a language commonly in use in the country and understand the customs and traditions of the society. General provisions are that applicants have good character and conduct; have no convictions for corruption or sex crimes; have not participated in genocide, terrorism, treason, or war crimes; and have resided in the country for seven years. The acquisition of nationality in the Democratic Republic of the Congo is restrictive as it requires that applicants have performed distinguished service to the nation or that naturalization will benefit the state. Applications must be approved by both the Council of Ministers and the National Assembly, before being granted by the President. Upon approval an applicant must renounce any other nationality. Besides foreigners meeting the criteria, other persons who may be naturalized include:

- Children born to foreigners in the Democratic Republic of the Congo, who are still residing in the DRC at majority may obtain nationality of origin by request;
- The legal spouse of a Congolese national can obtain nationality through marriage after seven years of matrimony;
- Minor children can be automatically naturalized when their parent acquires nationality, if they have resided in the country for five years; or
- Adoptees who have been legally adopted by at least one parent who was a Congolese national.

== Loss of nationality ==
Congolese nationals cannot be denaturalized, if they were born in the territory, and there are no provisions allowing them to renounce their nationality. Those who have previously lost their nationality may reacquire it if they meet the conditions to naturalize and have maintained ties to the nation. Nationality may be lost in the Democratic Republic of the Congo for having dual nationality or for fraud in a naturalization petition.

== Dual nationality ==
The government of the Democratic Republic of the Congo does not typically allow dual nationality. There is a moratorium in place since 2007 regarding depriving persons of their Congolese nationality if they have multiple nationalities.

=== Re-acquisition of Belgian nationality ===
Differing rulings have occurred in judicial cases in Belgium regarding whether Congolese nationals can recover their Belgian nationality. Under Article 24 of the 1984 Nationality Code, as amended in 2000 and 2012, a person who had, but lost other than by renunciation, their Belgian nationality, could reacquire it if at any time during their life, when they were a national of Belgium, they resided for at least one year in Belgium. In 2011, a judgment issued in the Court of Cassation ruled (Case n°C.10.0394.F) that Congolese-Belgians who had lost Belgian nationality at independence, were not entitled to reacquire Belgian nationality because their status was not defined in the nationality laws but in the Civil Code of the Congo. Further, the court weighed the terms of the 22 December 1961 Law concerning obtaining Belgian nationality which required that persons born in the Belgian Congo prior to independence to reside in Belgium for three years prior to 30 June 1960 to attain nationality and the 1984 Nationality Code which required a two-year residency for Congolese to obtain Belgian nationality. The opposite conclusion was reached in 2018 by the Brussels' Court of Appeals regarding a case (2017/AR/701) brought in the French-speaking Family Court (French: Tribunal de la famille francophone) in 2016. According to the appellate ruling, persons born in the Congo between 1908 and independence in 1960 were Belgian non-citizen nationals because there was a sole sovereign state administering two territories, thus their nationality was identical and dependent upon residing in Belgian territory.

== History ==
=== African Kingdoms (1400–1885) ===
In the region, inhabitants were typically arranged in lineage groups, known as kanda. From the early fifteenth century, a political system evolved wherein a single person was elected and began representing multiple kanda rather than his own kin to establish cooperation in trade and taxation, so that goods could safely pass among them. Marriage was used to create alliances among various groups and solidify cooperation. As the networks begin kanda grew and power accumulated, weaker groups were absorbed and became subjugated to the ruler. Governors ruled chiefdoms throughout the region extracting tributes, passing a portion on to the main ruler. By the time Diogo Cão, a Portuguese explorer, first established contact with the Kingdom of Kongo in 1483 it was the most powerful kingdom in the western part of the Congo Basin.

In 1491, they sent a fleet including priests, soldiers and builders, who after making their way to the capital, baptized king Nzinga a Nkuwu, who took the name João, and five of his leading chieftains. After the death of João's son, Afonso I of Kongo, the kingdom weakened and saw a succession of short-lived monarchs reign between 1545 and 1568, when Jaga warriors invaded the kingdom. In the 1620s the Dutch began trading in the region at a time when the economic and political power were shifting from the centralized government to the provinces. Different factions of the kingdom established relationships with varying European powers throughout the early seventeenth century. A succession dispute in 1665, plunged the kingdom into civil war eventually fracturing the kingdom. Though Pedro IV of Kongo was able to restore the unified kingdom in 1715, by proposing that succession shift through various kinship groups, the peace was insecure and war reignited in 1730. By the mid-eighteenth century British and French traders had developed ports in the region and diverted much of the trade to ports under their control. The chiefs of the Kongo became increasingly less important and their authority disintegrated.

To the east, between the Kwango River and Lake Tanganyika, the Kingdom of Luba emerged after 1500 and the Lunda Empire, around 1680. The area was dotted with agricultural chiefdoms, such as the Hemba, Kalundwe, Kanincin, Kanyok, Mpimin, Nsanga, and Ruund, which traded and intermarried with each other. Initially these groups based their socio-political hierarchy on kinship links, with the village headman overseeing the community of his extended family. Typically he was assisted by a council of elders and an electoral council which selected successors. As Luba expanded, it incorporated the Kalundwe, Kanyok, and Kikondja kingdoms. Under the rules of state which developed in the Luba Kingdom from the early eighteenth century, upon the death of the king, his capital became autonomous and was administrated by a council who served a female medium, believed to be the reincarnated, previous sovereign. Successor kings relocated to new capitals located near river basins, to enable them to manage commerce. In the Lunda Empire, the administration also was founded on kinship ties, but under their system an heir inherited the identity of his successor, including his family members and socio-political roles.

Throughout the eighteenth and nineteenth centuries, the Luba rulers expanded their authority and spheres of control. Over the same period, the Lunda affiliated groups created a network of interconnected, though independent states without a strong central authority. The two states interacted and shared a trade network with their rulers redistributing tributes and resources among their clients and subjects. The arrival of the Portuguese and introduction of the slave trade disrupted the authority of the rulers to monopolize trade networks and led to invasion by peoples who were not native to the region. By the end of the 1880s, factional conflict and slave raiding had contributed to the decline of the kingdoms. Simultaneously in Europe, there was widespread belief that the slave trade could be ended by diverting trade way from slaves and toward other goods and materials. Intervention in Africa was seen as not only a means to provide humanitarian protection, but also a means of developing new markets with valuable raw materials.

In 1875, Verney Lovett Cameron completed his quest to explore the Congo Basin and became the first European to cross Africa from east to west. News of his travels in the region reported that the region had potential for commercial and economic development. As he explored, Cameron had made agreements with the local chiefs to allow the British to develop commerce. Britain was unwilling to ratify the agreements and annex the territory at the time, but the economic opportunity appealed to Leopold II of Belgium. In 1876, he hosted an International Geographical Conference at the Palais Royal in Brussels with the object of convincing the dignitaries of Europe that his motives for acquiring a colony in Africa were humanitarian and scientific. At the conference, to which he had invited those most involved in exploring and studying the geography of Africa, Leopold proposed forming the International African Society, or the International Association for the Exploration and Civilization of the Congo to centralize and disseminate information about the efforts being made in Africa. The proposal was approved by the conference delegates and Leopold was elected president of the organization.

In 1877, Welsh explorer, Henry Morton Stanley completed an east-west trek across the African continent, charting the Congo. News of his travels reached Leopold, who began making plans to hire Stanley to help him acquire territory in the Congo. Disinterest for colonizing by Britain and the United States, led Stanley to accept an offer in 1878, from Leopold to explore and establish a colony. The following year, Leopold quietly bought out all of the other shareholders of the Committee for Studies of the Upper Congo, using the private holding company to disguise his funding and sole authority to make decisions about the development of the Congo. Stanley traveled through the Congo securing treaties from over 450 local chiefs, granting Leopold's private company their lands and a trade monopoly over them in exchange for a minimal share of trade goods. In 1884, his mission complete, Stanley returned to Europe. Leopold diplomatically maneuvered among world powers to gain recognition of his sovereignty over the area which he and Stanley claimed. At the Berlin Conference of 1884–1885 Leopold gained their endorsement of his plans.

=== Belgian colonial period (1885–1960) ===
On 5 May 1885, Leopold issued a royal decree naming his new private colony the Congo Free State (French: État Indepéndant du Congo). As was required by the Belgian Constitution, the Belgian Chamber assented to Leopold's becoming head of the new state, but specifically clarified that it was in a personal capacity and neither on behalf of Belgium nor under his role as Belgian king. He drafted a constitution, established his own private army, the Force Publique, and administered the territory as if it were his own proprietary colony. From 1890, reports began circulating criticizing Leopold's management of the Congo and the death and destruction caused by his army. In 1892, a Civil Code was propagated for the Congo, providing nationality for natives of the Congo Free State. It specified under Section 5 that children born within Congo whose parents were foreigners, but domiciled in Congo for a specified period when the child was born were Congolese, as were children born to foreigners in Congo who chose to naturalize at the age of majority. It also provided that though naturalization was personal, if a wife or minor child lost their nationality because the husband/father became Congolese, they would automatically obtain Congolese nationality.

A civil statute enacted on 4 May 1895 established procedures for registration of people in the colony. Under its terms, nationality was acquired through birth in the territory to Congolese parents, by naturalization, or through option. Under Title II, Articles 8 and 12, wives and children of foreigners followed the nationality of their husband/father from the moment a marriage was celebrated or a child was born, unless he was of unknown nationality. If his nationality was unknown, Congolese law prevailed. In a modification of the 1895 statute issued on 1 April 1901, to naturalize, foreigners must have reached the age of twenty one, and apply to Leopold with a request and documents providing proof of their birth, social status, residences, property, marital status, military service or exemption. These were to be accompanied by a statement outlining why he wanted Congolese nationality and why he had left his place of origin. Any foreign documents were required be accompanied by a French translation. If investigation of the documents and the applicant's character confirmed the applicant was acceptable, Leopold would grant naturalization and require an oath of faithfulness to the Congo Free State.

Initially, the registration system was effective, as it granted benefits to inhabitants, but it fell into disuse and people reverted to their customary practices. A Decree of 21 June 1904, affirmed that all Congolese nationals retained their nationality as long as they remained in the territory. Two decrees issued in 1906 attempted to recognize customary law for indigenous person. The Decree of 3 June, recognized that each native person was part of a chieftainship and the Circular of 16 August, specified that with the exceptions of polygamy and slavery, customary law was to be allowed in place of the European system if it was more convenient. Chiefs were allowed to establish varied marital practices, land distribution methods, and in general provide for the welfare of their specific communities in exchange for demands upon them which benefited the common good.

In 1908, after years of negotiations, Leopold was forced to cede the Congo to the Belgian state, in exchange for the government's agreement to assume his 110-million-franc debt. Upon establishing the Belgian Congo the Belgian Parliament decreed that it had a separate government from Belgium and that Belgians, registered Congolese, and foreigners had civil rights under law. It provided that Congolese who were not registered followed customary law. Congolese nationality was no longer mentioned in the bill, nor was naturalization, only registration, but it provided that inhabitants of the Congo were Belgian nationals who had Congolese status, that is non-citizen nationals of Belgium. Registration was open to persons who had assimilated into Western culture and were willing to abide by the Civil Code. Under the terms of the Belgian Nationality Law of 1909, persons who were Belgian nationals domiciled in the colonies followed Belgian law, which required descent from a Belgian father and unity of nationality for members of a family. By a decree issued on 2 February 1910, all indigenous persons were to be governed by customary law, meaning that their civil rights differed from the civil rights of persons born in Belgium, but all were subjects of the sovereign state. This practice led to sectarianism, as by 1917, there were 6,096 separate chiefdoms with different rules of which colonial officials had to try to administer.

The League of Nations mandate established Belgian administration for Ruanda-Urundi on 20 July 1922, prompting colonial administrators to transplant tens of thousands of the inhabitants of Ruanda-Urundi to the North Kivu area of Belgian Congo to work on agricultural plantations and as miners. On 21 August 1925, the Belgian Parliament passed a Bill for the Government of Ruanda-Urundi, which stipulated that though administered by the Governor-General of the Belgian Congo, Ruanda-Urundi was to be on an equal footing with the Congo and was to remain autonomous. With regard to the nationality of the inhabitants of the territory, the 1925 bill stipulated that Ruandan-Rundi natives were neither subjects, nationals, nor citizens of Belgium, but remained subjects of their respective native chiefs. They were given identity cards upon arrival in Congo, because they had no nationality, but no agreement between the two areas addressed the question of nationality. Children born to these migrant workers who had lived in the Belgian Congo for specified period when the child was born were Congolese under the Civil Code of 1892, as were children born to foreigners in Congo who chose to naturalize at the age of majority. The Belgian Nationality Law of 1922, stipulated that nationality was derived by descent from someone who was born in Belgium and applied only to Belgians with Belgian status. While it did not list provisions for acquiring nationality in the Congo by birth, it had provisions for those residing there to naturalize as Belgians. (Note: In 1925, the American Consul in Luanda, Angola, provided information in Dispatch No. 148 to the Secretary of State that the nationality laws in effect in the Congo at that time were the 1892 Civil Code and the 1901 naturalization decree. In 1929, via Despatch No. 432, additional information was provided to the Secretary of State from the American Chargé d'affaires in Brussels regarding an update to the nationality law in 1904. Two twenty-first century court decisions have come to opposite conclusions as to whether at that time, Congolese nationals had already been granted the status of non-citizen nationals of Belgium.) The Royal decree of 14 December 1932, which remained in force until 1984, brought together nationality legislation from 1922 through 1932. Under its terms nationality could only be inherited through the father for legitimate or children of unknown parentage (Note: Foundlings were assumed to have Belgian fathers under the 1932 law.) or the mother if they were illegitimate.

From 1932, a Belgian wife or child could refuse automatic acquisition of nationality by making a formal declaration. In the case of a wife, her declaration had to be made within six months of marriage and in the case of a child, before the age of twenty-three. From 1937 to the mid 1950s, under a program known as the Banyarwanda Immigration Mission (French: Mission d'immigration des Banyarwanda), forced migrations to the Congo took place because of overpopulation and famine in Ruanda-Urundi. In Congo, though living conditions had improved, the government remained centralized under the colonial administration with little representative input from the Congolese natives. There was no suffrage for the Congolese population, few opportunities for them in the colonial system, and the government offered suppressed all opposition, by jailing political dissidents. Periodic revolts had occurred in the 1930s and 1940s, but none seriously challenged Belgian rule. In the 1950s activists in Burundi and Rwanda began to press for self-determination and independence. In the Congo, minor reforms began, such as the introduction of secular education, the opening of Lovanium University, and in 1957 allowing Africans to take part in municipal elections. In 1959, ethnic conflict led to the Rwandan Revolution and thousands of refugees from Rwanda fled into the Congo. That year serious riots began in the Congo, which would lead to independence by the middle of 1960.

=== Post-independence (1960–present) ===
==== 1960–1965 ====
Upon gaining independence, Congolese Belgians lost their Belgian nationality on 30 June 1960. Under the terms of the Congolese Constitution of that year, those who had Congolese nationality by origin were descended of an ethnic group with a legitimate claim to land which was present in the territory in 1885, when the Congo Free State was founded. The provision left confusion over the status of the imported laborers from Ruanda-Urundi, which would remain an issue of conflict. On 11 July, the Katanga Province seceded from the new republic and with support from the Belgian government, declared the independent State of Katanga. It existed for two years, before being abolished and reunited with the Congolese state. In 1964, a new constitution was adopted which defined those who were Congolese as part of a tribe of the Congo prior to 18 October 1908, when Belgium acquired the territory from Leopold. This meant that Banyarwanda who arrived in Congo as imported laborers after 1908 lost their nationality. In 1965, the Congo adopted a nationality law (Décret-Loi du 18 septembre 1965), which specified that legitimate children acquired nationality through their Congolese fathers and illegitimate children acquired nationality from their Congolese mothers. It allowed foreign wives to acquire Congolese nationality by declaration upon marriage or naturalization of their spouse (Article 11) and required Congolese women to lose their nationality upon marriage to a foreigner or his naturalization in another country, unless she declared within six months that she wished to keep Congolese nationality (Article 18).

==== 1965–1997 ====
On 25 November 1965, Joseph-Désiré Mobutu led a military coup d'état taking control of the government. The constitution promulgated in 1967, by Mobutu provided in Article 46 that nationality was to be governed according to the Nationality Law. In that regard, on 26 March 1971, he decreed law 71-020 which provided that all Banyarwanda who had resided in the Congo prior to its independence regained their nationality. The name of the country was changed to Zaire on 27 October 1971. On 5 January 1972, under Law 72-002 the date of residence was modified to 1 January 1950, depriving any Banyarwanda who arrived after that date of their Zairian nationality. Under the 1972 statute, women automatically lost their Zairian nationality upon marriage to a foreigner unless within six months of the marriage they declared that they wanted to retain their nationality of origin. A foreign woman marrying a Zairian national or married to a man who naturalized could obtain nationality by renouncing her nationality of origin.

Law 81-002 of 29 June 1981 reset the qualification date for nationality to 1885 and gave women the same rights as men to pass their nationality to their children. It changed the effect of marriage upon nationality, stating that women automatically retained their original nationality unless they formally renounced it. The Law expressly cancelled Section 15 of the 1972, nullifying collective naturalizations under the statute for the Banyarwanda, leaving confusion over their status. Provisions which had existed under the 1965 and 1972 Nationality Laws for a court to examine corroborating evidence such as identity cards or previous nationality certificates were struck out of the 1981 statute. Disputes arose as to what ethnic groups were present in the territories of North and South Kivu in 1885 and whether all Banyarwanda should be required to go through the naturalization process. Two legal challenges were made to the 1981 statute, by politicians Mutiri Muyongo and Kalegamire Nyirimigabo, which had excluded them from serving in parliament because of the loss of their nationality. In 1996, Zaire's highest court, the Court of Cassation ruled in their favor, restoring their nationality, setting aside their removal from parliament, and validating the certificates of nationality and identity cards they had previously received under the Ministry of the Interior. At the conclusion of the First Congo War, Mobutu was deposed, Zaire became the Democratic Republic of the Congo again in May 1997, and Zairian nationals were granted blanket nationality regardless of where they were residing.

==== 1997–present ====
The Nationality Law Articles 2, 8, and 28, which now became part of the Family Code, were modified by a decree (Law N°. 197) on 29 January 1999, to comply with the transition of reorganizing the country under the 1997 Constitutional Decree (Law No. 005) and affixing the authority of the Democratic Republic of Congo. The Second Congo War began in 1998 and ended in 2003, when the Transitional Government of the Democratic Republic of the Congo was formed. The Transitional Government propagated a new nationality law. It defined those with Congolese nationality of origin as those who were descended of an ethnic group in the country at the independence of the territory, children born to Congolese parents, and children born within the Congo. It provided means for the individual acquisition, rather than a collective naturalization for any group, of nationality through adoption, option, or naturalization, subject to the approval by the National Assembly. Under the terms of the 2004 Nationality Law, derivative nationality through marriage was equalized for men and women. (Note: Refugee Documentation Centre of Ireland indicates that Article 5 of the 2004 Nationality Law allowed women equal ability to pass on their nationality to their children; however, Article 30 stipulated that women were denaturalized upon marriage to a foreigner. In the text of the 2004 Nationality Law, Article 5 is a definition list of terms and Article 30 concerns the recovery of nationality. Further, academic Bronwyn Manby, indicates that the 1981 revision of the Nationality Law equalized prior gender discrimination in the requirements of children's derivative nationality and the 2004 Law eliminated gender discrepancies in marriage provisions.) Stephen Jackson, an anthropologist and executive in international policy development, stated that the 2004 law left "legal loopholes" with regard to the Banyarwanda that could lead to them being denied naturalization. Among the issues, according to Jackson are that Article 6 deliberately did not define what ethnic groups inhabited the territory that became the Congo to avoid re-inflaming ethnic tensions. He also stated that interpretation of Article 22, which excluded persons who exploited Congo's wealth during the war, could indiscriminately be applied to all Burundian and Rwandan applicants, as it is a common perception that all Banyarwanda committed such economic crimes. In 2007, when it was discovered that a significant number of officials had multiple nationality, a law was passed in the National Assembly to suspend denaturalization on this basis and allow time to investigate whether a change in the legislation should occur.
