= Church of Christ in the Congo =

Church of Christ in the Congo Église du Christ au Congo
- Abbreviation: CCC; ECC
- Type: Union
- Classification: Protestant
- Orientation: evangelical
- Polity: Various
- Bishop: Rév.Dr. Andrée Bokundoa Bo-likabe
- Region: Democratic Republic of the Congo
- Headquarters: Kinshasa, Kinshasa Province, Democratic Republic of the Congo
- Members: 49,000,000
- Official website: egliseduchristaucongo.com

The Church of Christ in the Congo or CCC (in French, Église du Christ au Congo or ECC) is a union association of 100 evangelical and Protestant denominations and 49,000,000 members, in the Democratic Republic of the Congo.

Within the Democratic Republic of the Congo, it is often simply referred to as the Protestant Church, as it federates the vast majority of the Protestants in that country. It is a member of the Fellowship of Christian Councils and Churches in the Great Lakes and Horn of Africa.

According to the 2020 Report on International Religious Freedom, 95.4% of the country has a Christian affiliation; of these, an estimated 48.1% are Protestant, including evangelical Christians and the Church of Jesus Christ on Earth.

== History ==
The Union has its origins in a grouping of Protestant and Evangelical missionaries that took place in 1902. It was officially founded in 1924 as the Protestant Council of the Congo (Conseil protestant du Congo; CPC). In 1934, it took the name of the Church of Christ in the Congo. This union was named the Church of Christ in Zaire (Église du Christ au Zaïre; ECZ) from 1971 to 1997 under Mobutu's regime.

In the years leading up to 1970, many religious communities engaged in practices considered anarchic or subversive. The rapid proliferation of these groups, the doctrines they promoted, and particularly the ways in which they worshiped God, were viewed as posing a significant public risk. The Zairian government took action in 1970 to regulate religious worship, and, as part of this effort, all Protestant-leaning communities were merged by decision of the Zairian Executive Council (Conseil exécutif zaïrois), with this merger establishing the framework for which communities would belong to the church and set precise conditions for conducting religious activities. At its beginning, the Church of Christ in Congo brought together 53 Protestant communities, and it grew to 56 by 1973, after Presidential Ordinances No. 071/012 of 31 December 1971 and No. 073/013 of 14 February 1977, which regulated worship and confirmed the number of member communities. The Church of Christ in Congo now counts 100 member communities, with some estimates placing its membership at around thirty million.

== Organization and function ==
The ECC functions as a religious institution, and provides a central administration and a spiritual forum for the numerous Protestant denominations. It functions under a national synod and an executive committee. Both of these entities are assisted in their tasks by a national secretariat.

The ECC is said to be part of the One, Holy, Catholic, and Apostolic Church, but it also insists on maintaining unity in diversity, as they see it as being the only system common to the Holy Bible, the primitive church, and African traditions.

=== Leadership ===
The church is led by a National President who holds the rank of Bishop, and two Vice-Presidents. The National President is the presiding minister of the Cathedral of the Protestant Centennial in the Congo (French: Cathédrale du Centenaire Protestant au Congo), also known as the International Protestant Church of Kinshasa (French: Paroisse Internationale Protestante de Kinshasa) - the de facto head church of the ECC.

One of the previous National Presidents of the ECC was Monsignor Pierre Marini Bodho. After the Second Congo War, transitional institutions were formed that included former combatants, non-belligerent opposition members, and civil society representatives. During the 2003–2006 transition period, Mgr. Marini Bodho, seen as a neutral and broadly acceptable figure representing organized religion within civil society, served as President of the Senate, the upper house of the Congolese Parliament. He later won a Senate seat in the 2006 elections and continued to serve as a government senator.

At the provincial level, the ECC is overseen by the Provincial Presidency, which includes the Provincial President, Provincial Vice-President, and attached administrative or specialized services. The Provincial President serves as the representative of the National President and the Protestant faith within the province, and advocates for the Protestant communities before provincial authorities, government institutions, and public organizations. He is granted a special mandate from the National President to act legally on behalf of the ECC, its communities, or affiliated organizations when needed.

The Provincial President is the chief administrator of the church in the province, who manages daily operations and coordinates the work of the attached services. He is responsible for maintaining peace and cooperation among communities and ensuring the proper operation of shared initiatives, such as youth centers, schools, chaplaincies, hospitals, and community development projects, whether initiated locally or supported by the national or provincial synod. In cases of conflicts within or between communities, he works to achieve reconciliation and peaceful solutions, with the Provincial Moderator specifically handling disputes within a single community. The terms of office for the Provincial President and Vice-President are six years and are renewable.

=== Statistics ===
By 2025, it would have 49,000,000 members, 100 member Christian denominations and 34,528 schools.

In 2010, 59 Protestant communities were listed as part of the ECC:

No.	Community name (English)	French	Headquarters
1	Salvation Army Community	Communauté Armée du Salut; CAS	Kinshasa
2	Assembly of Brethren Community in Katanga	Communauté Assemblée des Frères au Katanga; CAFKAT	Lubumbashi
3	Baptist Community of Kivu	Communauté Baptiste du Kivu; CBK	Goma
4	Mennonite Brethren Churches Community in Congo	Communauté des Églises des Frères Mennonites au Congo; CEFMC	Kikwit
5	Free Churches Community in Congo	Communauté des Églises Libres au Congo; CELC	Bukavu
6	Baptist Community of Bandundu	Communauté baptiste de Bandundu; CBB	Bandundu
7	Grace Churches Community in Congo	Communauté des Églises de Grâce au Congo; CEGC	Bukavu
8	Pentecostal Churches Community	Communauté des Églises de Pentecôte; CEPAC	Bukavu
9	Evangelical Mennonite Community	Communauté Évangélique Mennonite; CEMK	Mbuji-Mayi
10	Disciples of Christ Community in Congo	Communauté des Disciples du Christ au Congo; CDCC	Mbandaka
11	Anglican Community of Congo	Communauté Anglicane du Congo; CAC	Bunia
12	Assemblies of God Community in Congo	Communauté des Assemblées de Dieu au Congo; CADC	Isiro
13	Baptist Community of the Congo River	Communauté Baptiste du Fleuve Congo; CBFC	Kinshasa
14	Baptist Community of Bas-Uele	Communauté Baptiste du Bas-Uélé; CBBU	Bondo
15	Baptist Community of Western Congo	Communauté Baptiste du Congo-Ouest; CBCO	Kinshasa
16	Evangelical Community of Christ in Central Africa	Communauté Évangélique du Christ du Coeur de l'Afrique; CECCA	Isiro
17	Evangelical Community of Christ in Ubangi	Communauté Évangélique du Christ en Ubangi; CECU	Gemena
18	Evangelical Alliance Community in Congo	Communauté Évangélique de l'Alliance au Congo; CEAC	Boma
19	Berean Evangelical Community in Congo	Communauté Évangélique Beréenne au Congo; CEBC	Shabunda
20	Evangelical Community of Central Africa	Communauté Évangélique du Centre de l'Afrique; CECA	Bunia
21	Episcopal Evangelical Community in Congo	Communauté Episcopale Évangélique au Congo; CEEC	Kisangani
22	Association of Evangelical Churches of the Lulonga Community	Communauté-Association des Églises Évangéliques de la Lulonga; CAAEL	Basankusu
23	Evangelical Community of Congo	Communauté Évangélique du Congo; CEC	Luozi
24	Free Community of Maniema-Kivu	Communauté Libre de Maniema-Kivu; CLMK	Shabunda
25	Evangelical Community of Kwango	Communauté Evangélique du Kwango; CEK	Wamba-Luadi
26	Free Methodist Community in Congo	Communauté Libre Méthodiste au Congo; CLMC	Bukavu
27	Mennonite Community in Central Congo	Communauté Mennonite au Congo-Central; CMC	Tshikapa
28	Methodist Community in Central Congo	Communauté Méthodiste au Congo-Central; CMCC	Kananga
29	United Methodist Community in Southern Congo	Communauté Méthodiste-Unie au Sud-Congo; CMUSC	Lubumbashi
30	Pentecostal Community in Congo	Communauté Pentecôtiste au Congo; CPCO	Kamina
31	Presbyterian Community in Congo	Communauté Presbytérienne au Congo; CPC	Kananga
32	Presbyterian Community of Kinshasa	Communauté Presbytérienne de Kinshasa; CPK	Kinshasa
33	Sankuru Region Community	Communauté Région-Sankuru; CRS	Kole
34	Assemblies of God Community in Eastern Congo	Communauté Assemblée de Dieu à l'Est du Congo; CADC	Bukavu
35	Union of Baptist Churches Community of Kwilu	Communauté-Union des Églises Baptistes du Kwilu; CUEBK	Kikwit
36	Community of Christ in Central Africa	Communauté du Christ au Centre de l'Afrique; CCCA	Lubumbashi
37	Assemblies of God Community in Congo	Communauté Assemblée de Dieu au Congo; CADC	Kinshasa
38	Brethren in Christ Community – Gareganze	Communauté des Frères en Christ-Gareganze; CFCG	Lubumbashi
39	Assembly of Evangelical Brethren Community in Congo	Communauté Assemblée des Frères Évangéliques au Congo; CAFEC	Nyankunde
40	Christian Churches Community in Africa	Communauté des Églises Chrétiennes en Afrique; CECA	Bukavu
41	Independent Evangelical Baptist Churches Community	Communauté des Églises Baptistes Indépendantes Évangéliques; CEBIE	Kikwit
42	Seventh-day Adventist Evangelical Community	Communauté Évangélique des Adventistes du 7° Jour; CEASJ	Lubumbashi
43	Congolese Evangelical Community	Communauté Évangélique Congolaise; CEC	Dibaya-Lubwe
44	Protestant Faithful Community	Communauté des Fidèles Protestants; CFP	Bondo
45	Evangelical Pentecostal Community in Katanga	Communauté Évangélique de Pentecôte au Katanga; CEP	Lubumbashi
46	Protestant Community of Katanga	Communauté Protestante du Katanga; CPKAT	Lubumbashi
47	Mambassa Community	Communauté Mambassa; CM	Mambasa
48	Autonomous Baptist Community of Wamba-Bakali	Communauté Baptiste Autonome entre Wamba-Bakali; CBA	Kenge
49	African Episcopal Baptist Community	Communauté Episcopale Baptiste Africaine; CEBA	Lubumbashi
50	Evangelical Cooperation Community in Congo	Communauté Coopération Évangélique au Congo; CCEC	Feshi
51	Evangelical Community in Ubangi-Mongala	Communauté Évangélique en Ubangi-Mongala; CEUM	Gemena
52	Light Community	Communauté Lumière; CL	Kinshasa
53	Baptist Community of South Kwango	Communauté Baptiste du Sud-Kwango; CBSK	Kasongo-Lunda
54	United Methodist Community in North Katanga	Communauté Méthodiste-Unie au Nord-Katanga; CMUNK	Lubumbashi
55	Baptist Churches Community of Kivu	Communauté des Églises Baptistes du Kivu; CEBK	Bukavu
56	Evangelical Community of Kasai	Communauté Évangélique du Kasaï; CEK	Kananga
57	Pentecostal Presbyterian Community in Africa	Communauté Presbytérienne pentecôtiste en Afrique; CPA	Katanga
58	Presbyterian Community of Western Kasai	Communauté Presbytérienne au Kasaï-Occidental; CPKO	Kasaï-Occidental
59	African Evangelical Community	Communauté Évangélique Africaine; CEA	Katanga

=== Membership admission ===
For a community to become an official or associate member of the ECC, it must be Protestant and legally recognized, affirm Jesus Christ as Lord, Savior, and Head of the Church, and accept the Bible as the sole foundation of faith. The community must uphold the unity and doctrine of the universal Church and avoid actions that could harm its interests. It is also required to recognize the authority of the ECC constitution and abide by decisions made by its governing bodies, particularly in resolving internal or inter-community conflicts. These decisions are considered binding as long as they respect public laws and order. The community must likewise maintain peaceful relations with others, promote church unity, and not originate from a schism within an existing member or sister church (Catholic or Orthodox). The application process includes obtaining a recommendation from the relevant provincial synod, submitting detailed information about its beliefs, structure, and leadership to the National President, and receiving approval from the National Executive Committee (comité exécutif national) and the National Synod after a three-month trial period. A membership fee must also be paid.

=== Withdrawal conditions ===
Any full or associate member may resign from the ECC by submitting a resignation letter to the National President, who will forward it to the National Executive Committee along with a report from the National Synod in whose jurisdiction the member operates. The resignation becomes effective only after the National Synod formally accepts it after a period of observation. The National Synod can also expel a member for serious violations of the ECC constitution or internal regulations, or if the member's practices conflict with biblical teachings, church doctrine, or conduct standards. Resigning or expelled members cannot claim any portion of the ECC's social fund or property, nor request the return of any donations previously given, nor seek reimbursement for contributions already made. Contributions in cash or kind remain the property of the ECC. Nonetheless, former members remain liable for unpaid dues and any proportional liabilities of the church.

== See also ==
- List of the largest Protestant bodies
- Pastor François-David Ekofo
- Christianity in the Democratic Republic of the Congo
- Catholic Church in the Democratic Republic of the Congo
- Evangelical Lutheran Church in Congo
