= Denise Nyakéru Tshisekedi =

First Lady of the Congo (born 1967)

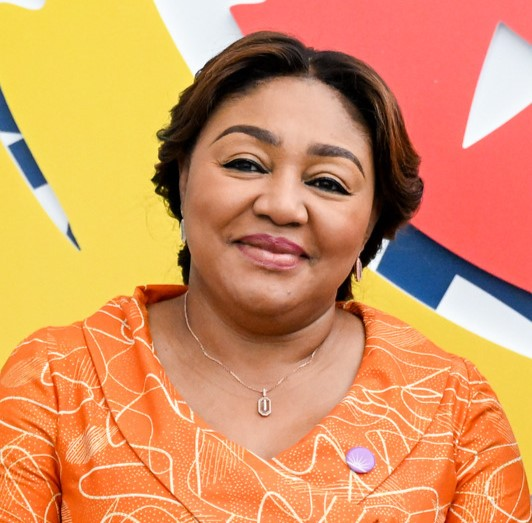
- Nyakeru in 2022

First Lady of the Democratic Republic of the Congo
- President: Félix Tshisekedi

Personal details
- Born: 9 March 1967 (age 59) Kailo, Congo-Leopoldville (now Kailo, Democratic Republic of the Congo)
- Other political affiliations: UDPS
- Spouse: Félix Tshisekedi
- Children: 5

Denise Nyakéru Tshisekedi (born 9 March 1967) is the wife of the President of the Democratic Republic of the Congo, Félix Tshisekedi.

== Biography ==
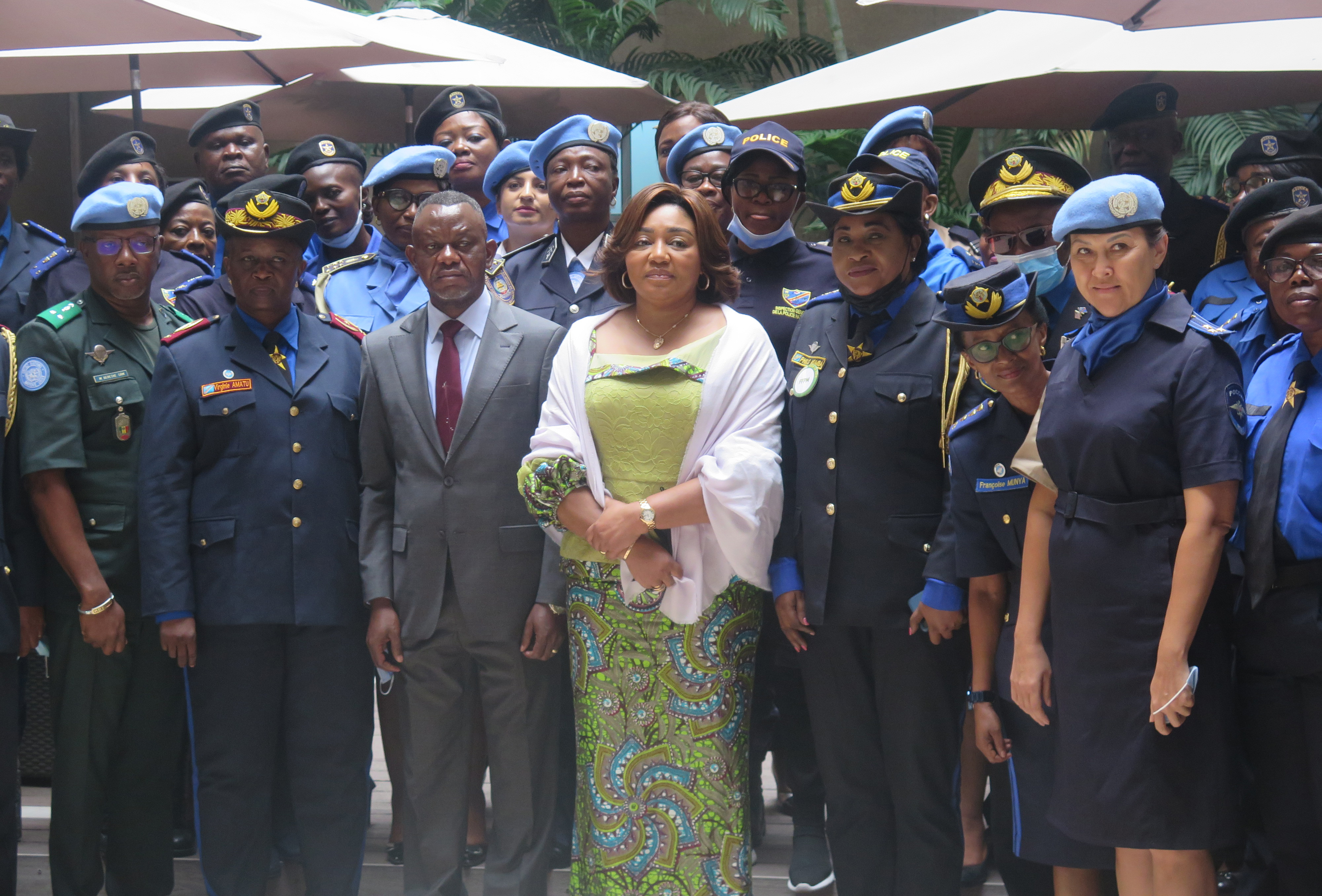
Denise Tshisekedi with MONUSCO

In March 2022 Denise Nyakéru Tshisekedi visited the Congolese National Police in Kinshasa during training with MONUSCO concerning gender mainstreaming in peacekeeping operations.

Denise's father, Étienne Nyakeru, was an évolué under Belgian rule. He had a position of responsibility in the administration of what was still the unified province of Kivu. One of his sisters, Jeannette, was a diplomat in London.

She was only nine months old when she lost her father, her mother and one of her uncles in a car accident in Bukavu. Due to the premature death of her parents, she was unable to learn Mashi, her mother tongue.
