= Members of the National Assembly of the Democratic Republic of the Congo (2006–2011) =

Members of the National Assembly elected for the 2006–2011 term were as follows:

== Bandundu Province ==
=== Kwango District ===
- Feshi (1 seat) - Fulgence Fono Makiasi (PALU)
- Kahemba (1 seat) - Toussaint Kaditanga Kikwanza (PALU)
- Kasongo-Lunda (5 seats) -
  - Emmanuel Kutonda Kolami Kiala (MLC)
  - Samais-Valentin Mitendo Mwadi-Yinda (SODENA)
  - Bieto Kutoma Silu (PALU)
  - Albert Kutekala Kaawa (PPRD)
  - Séraphin Bata Kyala Ngangu (ARC)
- Kenge (4 seats) -
  - Hubert Masala Loka Mutombo (ARC)
  - Théophile Mbemba Fundu di Luyindu (PPRD)
  - Christophe Mboso N'kodia Pwanga (CRD)
  - Célestin Nkenda Kaslema (PALU)
- Popokabaka (1 seat) - Jean-Pierre Pasi Zapamba Buka (CRD)

=== Kwilu District ===
- Bagata (2 seats) -
  - Sebastien Ngolomingi Mpele (PALU)
  - Jacques Ebweme Yonzaba (CNAP)
- Bulungu (9 seats) -
  - Willy Mubobo Nzama (PALU)
  - Séraphin Zimba-Zimba Mw-Ha-Kikar (PALU)
  - Baudoin Manzombi Kulumbamba (PALU)
  - Olivier Kamitatu Etsu (FR)
  - Cherry-Ernest Maboloko Ngulambangu (PALU)
  - Delphin Mbanza Mangwata (PALU)
  - Dieudonné Mupata Lugalu (CDC)
  - Rose Biasima Lala (MSR)
  - Jacques Sima Krulikiemun (MLC)
- Gungu (4 seats) -
  - Francois Lemba Sala Midimo (PALU)
  - Zenon Mukwakani Gahungu (PALU)
  - Remy Metela Pulumba Mikaba (PALU)
  - Ruffin Kikapa Kipanga (PALU)
- Idiofa (7 seats) -
  - Geneviève Pea-Pea Ndembo (PALU)
  - Donatien Mazono Ansur-Ankus (PALU)
  - Isidore Ntumba Mwangung (PALU)
  - Nicolas Nteny Olele Afya (PALU)
  - Constant N'Dom Nda Ombel (MLC)
  - Aubin Minaku Ndjalandjoko (PPRD)
  - Boris Mbuku Laka (FR)
- Kikwit (3 seats) -
  - Marc Mvwama Anedu (PALU)
  - Georgine Madiko Mulende (PALU)
  - Maleghi Lumeya Dhu (CP)
- Masi-Manimba (7 seats) -
  - Raphael Lusasi Kimangidi (PALU)
  - Balay Balalbala Kawanganda (PALU)
  - Jean Kayenga Bandakela (PALU)
  - Bernard Kazwala Mayanga (PALU)
  - Théo Mukwabatu Buka (PALU)
  - Tryphon Kin-Kiey Mulumba
  - Garry Mabongo Katembo (UCC)

=== Mai-Ndombe District - 13 deputies ===
- Bandundu ville (1 seat) - Prince Sylvestre Makila Ngakiber (Ind.)
- Bolobo (1 seat) - Barthelemy Botswali Lengomo (CODECO)
- Inongo (3 seats) -
  - Marc Mwamikedi Makani (MARC-PTF)
  - Albert M'Peti Biyombo (MLC)
  - jean luc samba bahati (PDSC)
- Kiri (1 seat) - Edmond Lofonde Bosembu (Ind.)
- Kutu (3 seats) -
  - Joseph N'Singa Udjuu (UCRJ)
  - Jean-Pierre Lebughe Izaley (CDC)
  - Sebastien Lessedjina Ikwame (PRC)
- Kwamouth (1 seat) - Jacques Katalay Mburubalo (MLC)
- Mushie (1 seat) - Bokiaga Pembe Didace (PDC)
- Oshwe (1 seat) - Egide-Michel Ngokoso Apa (Ind.)
- Yumbi (1 seat) - Gentiny Ngobila Mbaka (PPRD)

== Bas-Congo - 24 deputies ==
- Boma ville (2 seat) -
  - Adboul Ngoma Kosi (CODECO)
  - Bosco Mananga Ma Tshiama (PPRD)
- Kasangulu (1 seat) - Jean-Claude Vuemba Luzamba (MPCR)
- Kimvula (1 seat) - Ruffin Mpaka Mawete (REC-les Verts)
- Lukula (2 seats) -
  - Cesar Tsasa Di Ntumba (PPRD)
  - Cesar Khonde Mazombe (Ind.)
- Luozi (1 seat) - Nsemi Ne Muanda (Ind.)
- Madimba (3 seats) -
  - Simon Mboso Kiamputu (FR)
  - Richard Makuba Lutondo (ACDC)
  - Antoine Ghonda Mangalibi (PPRD)
- Matadi ville (3 seats) -
  - Lajos Bidiu Bas-Congo Nkebi (MLC)
  - Fabrice Puela Albert (FR)
  - Georgette Matondo Kati Mayala (PRRD)
- Mbanza-Ngungu (4 seats) -
  - Augustin Kisombe Kiaku Muisi (MDD)
  - Jacques Lunguana Matumona (MLC)
  - Marie-Madeleine Mienze Kiaku (PPRD)
  - Gilbert Kiakwama Kia Kiziki (CDC)
- Moanda (2 seats) -
  - Edmond Luzolo Lua-Nganga (MSR)
  - Jean-Pierre Bangalyba Baly (MLC)
- Seke-Banza (1 seat) - Joseph Ngoma Di Nzau Matona (ARREN)
- Songololo (2 seats) -
  - Joseph Mpaka Malundama
  - Alphonse Kembukuswa Ne Nlaza (NDD)
- Tshela (2 seats) -
  - Edmond Longo Ki Mbenza Makasi (PPRD)
  - Pascal Ndudi Ndudi (PDC)

== Équateur ==
=== Équateur District 10 deputies ===
- Basankusu (1 seat) - Nicolas Akpanza Mobuli (MLC)
- Bikoro (2 seats) -
  - Henri Balengola Banyele (MLC)
  - Joseph Ipalaka Yobwa (DCF-COFEDEC)
- Bolomba (1 seat) - Pierre Maloka Makondji (PUNA)
- Bomongo (1 seat) - Patrick Mayombe Mumbyoko (MLC)
- Ingende (1 seat) - Micheline Bie Bongenge (MLC)
- Lukolela (1 seat) - Eugene Lomata Etitingi (MLC)
- Mankanza (1 seat) - Jean-Felix Mata Ebeka Ebama (MSR)
- Mbandaka ville (2 seats) -
  - Charles Bofasa Equateur Djema (GR)
  - Jose Endundo Bononge (PDC)

=== Mongala District - 11 deputies ===
- Bongandanga (3 seats) -
  - Fidel Tingombay Mondonga (Ind.)
  - Dieudonne Agbumana Motingia (Ind.)
  - Robert Bopolo Mbongenza Mbunga (PDC)
- Bumba (5 seats) -
  - Arsene Ambuku Goti (MLC)
  - Omer Egwake Ya'Ngembe (MLC)
  - Crispin Ngbundu Malengo (CP)
  - Baudouin Mokoha Monga Adogo (Ren PE)
  - Antoine Roger Bumba Monga Ngoy (PPRD)
- Lisala (3 seats) -
  - Jose Engbanda Mananga (RCDN)
  - Marie-Louise Ekpoli Lenti (Ind.)
  - Pascal Lipemba Ikpanga (MLC)

=== Sud-Ubangi District - 18 deputies ===
- Budjala (4 seats) -
  - Jean-Lucien Bussa Tongba (MLC)
  - Jean-Matthieu Mohulemby Bubangakozo (UDEMO)
  - Felix Vunduawe Te Pemako (MPR)
  - Fulgence Mangbanzo Dua Engenza (PDC)
- Gemena (7 seats) -
  - Jose Makila Sumanda (MLC)
  - Rabbin Kpenumo Moolongawi
  - Gustave Alenge Nadonye (MLC)
  - Jacques Segbewi Zamu (PPRD)
  - Albert Gigba Gite (MLC)
  - Pascal Selinga Kodeye-Wene (MSR)
  - Adel Degbalase Kanda (MLC)
- Kungu (4 seats) -
  - Jean-Marie Gapemonoko Lobotdumba (UDEMO)
  - Leon Botoko Imeka (MLC)
  - Gaston Longina Bwana (Ind.)
  - Jean-Bertin Atandele Soge (Ind.)
- Libenge (2 seats) -
  - Jean-Pierre Bobe Yaboy (MLC)
  - Seraphin Ngwande Mebale-Balezu (PDC)
- Zongo ville (1 seat) - Vicky Bokolo Nyaswa (Ind.)

=== Tshuapa District - 9 seats ===
- Befale (1 seat) - Dieudonne Kamona Yumba (PRM)
- Boende (2 seats) -
  - Willy Bakonga Wilima (PRM)
  - Joseph Djema Ngoy Luma (MLC)
- Bokungu (2 seats) -
  - Titien Longomo Nsongo (UDEMO)
  - Jean-Robert Lomanga Longenga (MLC)
- Djolu (1 seat) - Pancrace Boongo Nkoy (MLC)
- Ikela (2 seats) -
  - Ferdinard Ekam Wina (UNADEC)
  - Jean-Bertrand Ewanga (PPRD)
- Monkoto (1 seat) - Francois Ekofo Panzoko Jean (UDEMO)

== Kasai-Oriental ==
=== Tshilenge District ===
- Territoire de Katanda (2 seats)
  Constantin Kasongo Munganga (RCDN)
  (UDPS)

=== Kabinda District - 12 deputies ===
- Kabinda Territory (3 seats) -
  - Adolphe Lumanu Mulenda Bwana N'Sefu (PPRD)
  - Jacques Sekoutoure Ndjibu Kapaule (CDC)
  - Jean-Martin Mukonkole Kibongie Mukumadi (RCDN)
- Kamiji Territory (1 seat)
  - Jean-Chrysostome Mukanya Nkashama (FIS)
- Lubao Territory (2 seats) -
  - Jean-Pierre Mulenda Mbo Milamba (CDD)
  - Joseph Kahenga Sompo (Ind.)
- Lupatapata Territory (1 seat)
  - Gregoire Katende Wa Ndaya Muledi (FR)
- Mwene-Ditu ville (2 seats) -
  - Georges Tshilengi Mbuyi Shambuyi
  - Benjamin Ilunga Kazadi
- Ngandajika Territory (3 seats) -
  - Benjamin Muamba Mulunda (MLC)
  - Alain Mbaya Kakasu (ADECO)
  - Dieudonne Kazadi Nyembwe (PPRD)

== Katanga Province ==
=== Haut-Lomami District - 17 deputies ===
- Bukama (4 seats) -
  - Rosen Mwenze Wakadilo (Ind.)
  - Jean-Jacques Kalenga Wa Kubwilu (Ind.)
  - Damase Muba Kitwa (PPRD)
  - Crispin Mutumbe Mbuya (UNAFEC)
- Kabongo (4 seats) -
  - Yvonne Mutombo Ngoy (PPRD)
  - Kashemukunda Kasongo-Numbi (Ind.)
  - Rene Nday Kabongo Kyanza Ngombe (MSR)
  - Buffon Banza Lupusa Biata-Biale (PRP)
- Kamina (3 seats) -
  - Nkundu Mwenze Mutombo (Ind.)
  - Eugenie Mbayo Kilumba (Ind.)
  - Wilfrid Mbuya Mimbanga Mwabilwa (UNAFEC)
- Malemba-Nkulu (4 seats) -
  - Aime Ngoy-Mukena Lusa-Diese (PPRD)
  - Ivan Mulongo Ngoy (UNAFEC)
  - Jean Mulunda Shimbi (Ind.)
  - Che Kabimbi Ngoy Mwana Ngoy (Ind.)
- Sakania (2 seats)
  - Fulbert Kunda Kisenga Milundu (MLC)
  - Moise Chokwe Cembo

=== Haut-Katanga District - 24 seats ===
- Kambove (2 seats) -
  - Denis Kashoba Kabonshi (MLC)
  - Bernard Kwebwa Muwele (PPRD)
- Kaniama (1 seat) - Gilbert Kasongo Sakadi (PPRD)
- Kasenga (2 seats) -
  - Ghislain Kienge Dyashi (Ind.)
  - Cyprien Kaubo Mutula Lwa Matanda (CODECO)
- Kipushi (1 seat) - Jacques Bakambe Shesh (CDD)
- Likasi ville (3 seats) -
  - Dany Banza Maloba (Ind.)
  - Dieudonne Kayombo Sekesenu (ADECO)
  - Idesbald Petwe Kapande (PPRD)
- Lubumbashi ville (11 seats) -
  - Moise Katumbi Chapwe (PPRD)
  - Jean-Claude Muyambo Kyassa (CODECO)
  - Augustin Katumba Mwanke (PPRD)
  - Edouard Edo Kasongo Bin Mulonda (Ind.)
  - Floribert Kaseba Makunko (PPRD)
  - Nsungu Banza Mukalay (Ind.)
  - Richard Muyej Mangeze (PPRD)
  - Honorius Kisimba Ngoy Ndalewe (UNAFEC)
  - Jean Mbuyu Luyongola (PPRD)
  - Fifi Masuka Saini (MLC)
  - Alexis Takizala Masoso (PDSC)
- Mitawaba (1 seat) - Felicien Lukunga Katanga (PPRD)
- Pweto (3 seats) -
  - Etienne Kisunka Cola (RSF)
  - Philippe Katanti Mwitwa (PPRD)
  - Jean-Pierre Ilunga Kampanyi

=== Tanganyika District - 17 seats ===
- Kabalo (2 seats) -
  - Gerard Nkulu Mwenze (PPRD)
  - Sophie Kakudji Yumba (UNAFEC)
- Kalemie (4 seats) -
  - Alain Mulya Kalonda (PRM)
  - Marie-Louise Mwange Musangu (PPRD)
  - Vicky Katumwa Mukalay (FSIR)
  - Zephyrin Kasindi Yumbe Sulbali (Ind.)
- Kongolo (3 seats) -
  - Theodore Mugalu Wa Mahingu (PPRD)
  - Jacques Muyumba Ndubula (PPRD)
  - Richard Ngoy Kitangala (CCU)
- Manono (3 seats) -
  - Gerardine Kasongo Ngoie (PPRD)
  - Kasongo Banze Bwana (PPRD)
  - Jacques Nkulu Mupenda Mukala (Ind.)
- Moba (4 seats) -
  - Charles Mwando Nsimba (UNADEF)
  - Guillaume Samba Kaputo (PPRD)
  - Perpetue Kapindo Tundwa (UNADEF)
  - Maurice Kafindo Bin Kosamu (UNADEF)
- Nyunzu (1 seat) - Dieudonne Kamona Yumba (PRM)

== Kinshasa - 58 deputies ==
- Kinshasa 1 (14 seats) -
  - Adam Bombole Intole (MLC)
  - Thomas Luhaka Losendjola (MLC)
  - Wivine Moleka Nsolo (PPRD)
  - Pierre-Jacques Chalupa (Ind.)
  - Franck Diongo Shamba (MLP)
  - Yves Kisombe Bisika Lisasi (MLC)
  - Jacques Luzitu Jsipako (PALU)
  - Serge Kayembe Mwadianvita (CP)
  - Daniel Mbuya Mukiewa (PCB)
  - Flory Dumbi Mbadu (ABAKO)
  - Pierre Dibenga Tshibundi (ACDC)
  - Anicet Kuzunda Mutangiji (ANC-PF)
  - Andre Mavungu Mbunga (CRD)
  - Helene Ndombe Sita (CDC)
- Kinshasa 2 (14 seats) -
  - Ifoto Ingele (CP)
  - Pitchou Bolenge Yoma (MLC)
  - Eugene Kabongo Ngoy (MLC)
  - Lievin Lumande Mada
  - Colette Tshomba Ntundu (FR)
  - Yvon Yanga Kidiamene (UDR)
  - Francis Kalombo Tambwa (PPRD)
  - Ellysee Dimandja Ambowa Feza (CODECO)
  - Pascal Kamba Mandungu (FONUS)
  - Francine Kimasi Bekili (ABAKO)
  - Jean-Baptiste Mbalu Kikuta (MSR)
  - Annie Dianzenza Mayasilwa (CDC)
  - Leaon Kisolokele Lukelo (DC)
  - Jean-Pierre Kutudisa Panda (PALU)
- Kinshasa 3 (13 seats) -
  - Jean-Oscar Kiziamina Kibila (RCPC)
  - Didier Mudizo Musengo (MLC)
  - Godefroid Mayobo Mpwene Ngantient
  - Dominique Kabengele Ngoy (MLC)
  - Pius Muabilu Mbayu Mukala (PPRD)
  - Neron Mbungu Mbungu (UNADEC)
  - Denis Kambayi Cimbumbu (CP)
  - Jean-Pierre Lisanga Bonganga (CDC)
  - Marcel Mazhunda Zanda (ACDC)
  - Ambroise Midi Giamany Zozey (FR)
  - Philippe Mbenza Kunietama (MSR)
  - Evariste Ejiba Yamapia (RCD)
  - Marie-Therese Dembo Olama (ANCC)
- Kinshasa 4 (17 seats) -
  - Jean Kahusu Makwela (PALU)
  - Blaise Ditu Monizi (Ind.)
  - Marie-Ange Lukiana-Mufwankolo Dialukupa (PPRD)
  - Esaie Nsimba Lutete (ABAKO)
  - Cleophas Guyzanga Guyandiga (PALU)
  - Arthur Athu A Guyimba (PALU)
  - Fidele Babala Wandu (MLC)
  - Leonne Kati-Kati Mundele (ANCC)
  - Charles Makengo Ngombe Matoka (CP)
  - Gamanda Matadi Nenga (RCD)
  - Francois Luemba Buela (OPEKA)
  - Arthur Wanga Kipangu (FR)
  - Victor Nguala Bananika (CODECO)
  - Joseph Mbenza Thubi (Ind.)
  - Christophe Kingotolo Lunianga (MSR)
  - Faustin Mputu Bokenga (CCU)
  - Louise Nzazi Muana (ADECO)

== Maniema - 12 deputies ==
- Kabambare (2 seats) -
  - Emmanuel Ramazani Shadary (PPRD)
  - Richard Agamba Amuri (MSR)
- Kailo (1 seat) - Pascal-Joseph M'Vula Kapome (PPRD)
- Kasongo (3 seats) -
  - Barnabe Kikaya Bin Karubi (PPRD)
  - Justin Kalumba Mwana Ngongo (PANU)
  - Didier Molisho Sadi (MSR)
- Kibombo (1 seat) - Jean-Pierre Kalema Losona (PPRD)
- Kindu city (1 seat) - Alexis Thambwe Mwamba (Ind.)
- Lubutu (1 seat) - Bernard Guyeni Masili (PPRD)
- Pangi (2 seats) -
  - Athanase Matenda Kyelu (Ind.)
  - Jean-Dieudonne Bosaga Sumaili (PPRD)
- Punia (1 seat) - Gustave Omba Bindimono (Ind.)

== Nord-Kivu (48 deputies) ==
- Beni territory (10 seats) -
  - Salomon Banamuhere Baliene (PPRD)
  - Pheresie Kakule Molo (DCF-COFEDEC)
  - Gilbert Paluku Wa Muthethi (Ind.)
  - Kakusi Katsuva Syahembulwa (DCF-COFEDEC)
  - Jean-Bosco Mapati Kahindo (FR)
  - Vincent Sibkasibka Malaume (PPRD)
  - Jerome Kamate Lukundu (FR)
  - Edmondus Kasereka Vukutu (MSR)
  - Schadrac Baitsura Musowa (RCD)
  - Jacques-Protais Kimeme Bin Rukohe (MLC)
- Beni ville (2 seats) -
  - Jean-Louis-Ernest Kyaviro Malemo (FR)
  - Esdras Sindani Mulonde (PPRD)
- Butembo ville (4 seats) -
  - Godefroy Bayoli Kambale
  - Muhiwa Kakule Sumbusu (FR)
  - Pierre Pay Pay Wa Syakassighe (DCF-COFEDEC)
  - Ferdinand Kambere Kalumbi (PPRD)
- Goma ville (4 seats) -
  - Dieudonne-Jacques Bakungu Mythondeke (PPRD)
  - Alphonse Muhindo Kasole (PPRD)
  - Dieudonne Kambale Kalimumbalu (DCF-COFEDEC)
  - Elvis Mutiri Wa Bashara (MLC)
- Lubero (9 seats) -
  - Juliette Mbambu Mughole (UPRDI)
  - Vikwirahangi Paluku Mikundi (PPRD)
  - Jeannette Kavira Mapera (DCF-COFEDEC)
  - Jerome Kambale Lusenge Bonane (DCF-COFEDEC)
  - Jacques Katembo Makata (MSR)
  - Emmanuel Bahati Vitsange (FR)
  - Christien Katsuva Sikuli (MSR)
  - Wavungire Matabishi Musakani (PPRD)
  - Enosch Kakule Byatekwa (CDC)
- Masisi (8 seats) -
  - Jules Mugiraneza Ndizeye (PANADI)
  - Bertin Baganyingabo Kanyeshuli (RCD)
  - Valentin Balume Tussi (PPRD)
  - Francois Ayobangira Samuura (RCD)
  - Nephtali Nkizinkiko Mpawe (PANADI)
  - Faustin Dunia Bakarani (MLC)
  - Thomas V De Paul Safari Wa Kibancha (PPRD)
  - Raymond Mushesha Ndoole (MSR)
- Nyiragongo (1 seat) - Joseph Ndalifite Hangi (PPRD)
- Rutshuru (8 seats) -
  - Come Sekimonyo Wa Magango (PPRD)
  - Celestin Vunabandi Kanyamihigo (RCD)
  - Jean-Luc Mutokambali Luvanzayi (Ind.)
  - Mwene-Songa Nyabirungu Mwene Songa (PPRD)
  - Georges Sabiti Muhire (RCD)
  - With-Xavier Buunda Baroki (PPRD)
  - Jean-Bosco Barihima Ka-Butsiri (FR)
  - Cyprien Iyamulemye Baragomanwa (PANADI)
- Walikale (2 seats) -
  - Sabine Muhima Bintu (PPRD)
  - Jeanne Bunda Bitendwa (MMM)

== Orientale Province ==
=== Bas-Uele District - 7 seats ===
- Aketi Territory (1 seat) - Georgette Agadi Bukani Bakwa (MLC)
- Ango Territory (1 seat) - Emmanuel Ngbalindie Sasa (Ind.)
- Bambesa Territory (1 seat) - Jean-Paul Nemoyato Bagebole (CDC)
- Bondo Territory (2 seats) -
  - Lucie Kipele Aky Azua (FR)
  - Desire Koyengete Solo (UDEMO)
- Buta Territory (1 seat) - Mohamed Bule Gbangolo Basabe (MLC)
- Poko Territory (1 seat) - Gilbert Tutu Tudeza Kango (MSR)

=== Haut-Uele District - 12 seats ===
- Dungu (1 seat)
  - Jean-Dominique Takis Kumbo (Ind.)
- Faradje (2 seats) -
  - Jean Obote Sirika (PPRD)
  - Jean–Christophe Budri Ngaduma (CDC)
- Niangara (1 seat) -
  - Chrisostome Gbandazwa Masibando (MLC)
- Rungu (3 seats) -
  - Simon Bulupiy Galati (PPRD)
  - Reginard Missa Amubuombe (MSR)
  - Dieudonne Anziama Kamuzibami (FR)
- Wamba (3 seats) -
  - Celestin Bondomiso Bebisyame (FR)
  - Jean-Valere Angalikiana Kalumbula (PPRD)
  - Jean-Baudouin Idambituo Bakaoto (RPE)
- Watsa (2 seats) -
  - Vital Budu Tandema (FR)
  - Jean-Pierre Batumoko Afozunde (FSDD)

=== Ituri District - 28 deputies ===
- Aru (6 seats) -
  - Medard Autsai Asenga (PPRD)
  - Le Bon Mambo Mawa (PPRD)
  - Casimir Sindani Anyama (PPRD)
  - Baudouin Adia Leti Mawa (PPRD)
  - Donatien Kanyi Nzia (MLC)
  - Martin Aza Bhatre (Ind.)
- Djugu (8 seats) -
  - Jean-Baptiste Dhetchuvi Matchu-Mandje (UPC)
  - Maurice Bura Pulunyo (PPRD)
  - Gilbert Ndjaba Kpande (PPRD)
  - Edouard Balembo Baloma Kasomba (UPC)
  - Martin Shalo Dudu (FR)
  - Jean-Pierre Ngabu Kparri (CODECO)
  - Angele Tabu Makusi (MSR)
  - Jean-Claude Logo Mugenyi (RCD)
- Irumu (5 seats) -
  - Gilbert Sugabo Ngbulabo (PPRD)
  - Baudouin Adirodu Mawazo (FR)
  - Pele Kaswara Tahigwomu (UPC)
  - Mylet Furabo Tondabo
  - Claude Kabagambe Magbo (RCD)
- Mahagi (7 seats) -
  - Emmanuel Adubango Ali (PPRD)
  - Wapol Upio Kakura (PPRD)
  - Jean-Bosco Ukumu Nyamuloka (Ind.)
  - Pierre-Claver Uweka Ukaba (PPRD)
  - Moise Uwor Cwinya'ay (FR)
  - Dieudonne Upira Sunguma Kagimbi (MSR)
  - Jean-Marie Uvoya Cwinya'ay (CODECO)
- Mambasa (2 seats) -
  - Joseph Ucci Mombele (FR)
  - Cyprien Aleku Kitika (PPRD)

=== Tshopo District - 16 seats ===
- Bafwasende (1 seat) - Michel Botoro Bodias (MSR)
- Banalia (1 seat) - Moke Mambango (PPRD)
- Basoko (2 seats) -
  - Claudien Likulia Lifoma (Ind.)
  - Anastasie Moleko Moliwa (PPRD)
- Isangi (3 seats) -
  - Dieu-Donne Bolengetenge Balea (MSR)
  - Jacques Bonyoma Falanga (PPRD)
  - J Asumani Likalnganyo (CP)
- Kisangani ville (5 seats) -
  - Jean Yagi Sitolo (PPRD)
  - Emile Bongeli Ye Ikelo Ya Ato (PPRD)
  - Jean Bamanisa Saidi (Ind.)
  - Hubert Moliso Nendolo Bolita (CP)
  - Freddy Isomela Iyongha (FR)
- Opala (1 seat) - Alexis Likunda Ndolo (MSR)
- Ubundu (2 seats) -
  - Gaston Musemena Bongala (PPRD)
  - Nestor Tela Falanga (MSR)
- Yahuma (1 seat) - Ernest Etula Libange (MLC)

== Sud-Kivu - 32 seats) ==
- Bukavu ville (5 seats) -
  - Vital Kamerhe (PPRD)
  - Jean-Marie Bulambo Kilosho (PANU)
  - Louis-Leonce Chirimwami Muderhwa (PPRD)
  - Sylvanus Mushi Bonane (UPRDI)
  - Felicien Milambo Ngongo (PPRD)
- Fizi (3 seats) -
  - Pardonne Kaliba Mulanga (PRM)
  - Jean-Kevin Jemsi Mulengwa (DCF-COFEDEC)
  - Ferdinand Essambo Lukye (PPRD)
- Idjwi (1 seat) - Paulin Bapolisi Bahuga Polepole (MSR)
- Kabare (4 seats)
  - Celestin Cibalonza Byaterana (PPRD)
  - Deogratias Mubalama Kashamangali (UPRDI)
  - Modeste Bahati Lukwebo (Ind.)
  - Solide Birindwa Chanikire (PPRD)
- Kalehe (4 seats) -
  - Thomas Muulwa Kataala (PPRD)
  - Gregoire Mirindi Carhangabo (PRP)
  - Pius Bitakuya Dunia (MSR)
  - Fernand Sumari Balike (CCU)
- Mwenga (3 seats) -
  - Damien Kwabene Mwetaminwa (PPRD)
  - Leon Mumate Nyamatomwa (MSR)
  - Justin Karhibahaza Mukuba (UPNAC)
- Shabunda (2 seats) -
  - Cyprien Kyamusoke Bamusulanga (PPRD)
  - Auguste Mopipi Mukulumanya
- Uvira (5 seats) -
  - Wildor Makonero Wildor (PPRD)
  - Martin Bitijula Mahimba (MSR)
  - Marthe Bashomberwa Lalia (PPRD)
  - Samuel Kanyegere Lwaboshi (Mai-Mai)
  - Justin Bitakwira Bihona-Hayi (PCGB)
- Walungu (5 seats) -
  - Aimé Boji Sangara Bamanyirwe (PPRD)
  - Manasse Bashizi Zirimwabagabo (CVP)
  - Christophe Masumbuko Bashomba (PCGB)
  - Leonard Masu-Ga-Rugamika (PPRD)
  - Alphonse Munamire Mungu-Akonkwa (UPRDI)
