= Tingi-Tingi Airport =

- IATA: none; ICAO: FZOB

Summary
- Airport type: Public
- Serves: Tingi-Tingi, Lubutu
- Elevation AMSL: 1,862 ft / 568 m
- Coordinates: 0°47′27″S 26°38′37″E

Map
- Location of the airport in Democratic Republic of the Congo

Runways
Direction	Length		Surface
Direction	m	ft	Surface
13/31	1,000	3,280	Paved
- Sources: Google Maps

Tingi-Tingi Airport (ICAO: FZOB) is a highway strip airport serving the village of Tingi-Tingi in Lubutu Territory, Maniema Province, Democratic Republic of the Congo.

The runway is a widened and paved section of the N3 road, 5 kilometres (3.1 mi) southeast of the village. Some runway markings are visible.

== See also ==
- List of airports in the Democratic Republic of the Congo
