= Walikale Territory =

Territory of the Democratic Republic of the Congo

Walikale Wilaya ya Walikale (Swahili)
- Territory
- Territoire de Walikale
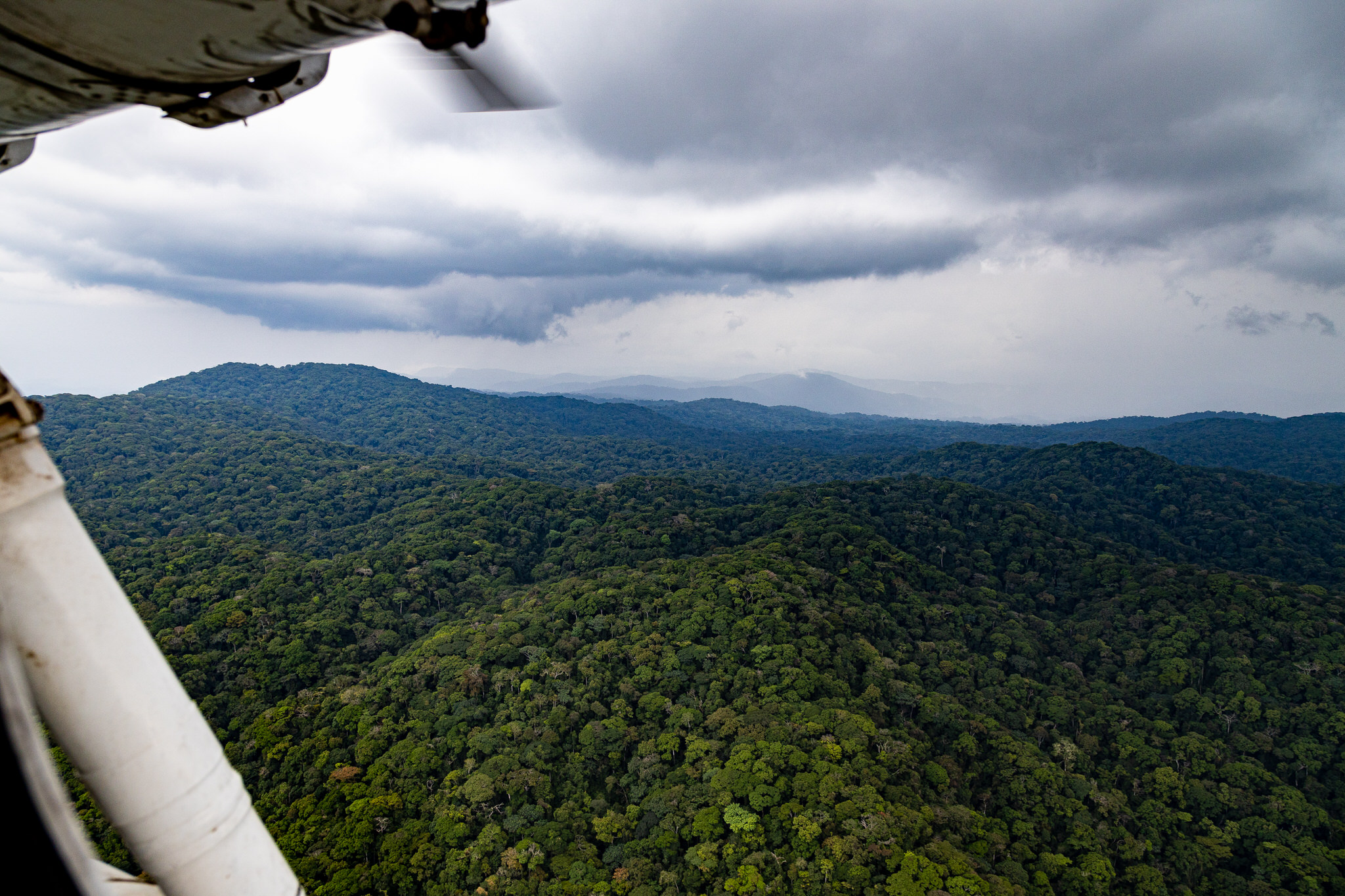
- Walikale on a map of North Kivu Province
- Location in DR Congo
- Coordinates: 01°25′S 28°02′E
- Country: DR Congo
- Province: North Kivu
- HQ: Walikale
- Time zone: UTC+2 (CAT)

Walikale Territory is a territory situated in North Kivu Province, within the eastern region of the Democratic Republic of the Congo (DR Congo). Its administrative headquarters are located in the town of Walikale, which lies along Democratic Republic of the Congo National Road No. 3 between Bukavu and Lubutu (Maniema Province). The territory occupies the Lowa River valley and is positioned approximately 135 km west of Goma.

Walikale is renowned for its cassiterite deposits, a mineral refined into tin. As of 2008, control over these resources was heavily contested due to the Kivu conflict, with warlords and armed factions dominating extraction activities. The Bisie mine, one of the territory’s largest cassiterite sources, was under the authority of the renegade 85th Brigade of the Armed Forces of the Democratic Republic of the Congo (FARDC), commanded by Colonel Samy Matumo, until early 2009. That year, the mine transitioned to oversight by FARDC units undergoing "accelerated integration," a government-led initiative to absorb former rebel forces into the national army.

Security challenges persist in Walikale, notably due to activities by the Democratic Forces for the Liberation of Rwanda (FDLR). In May 2009, the group launched attacks in Busurungi, a settlement near the border with South Kivu Province. Busurungi and its surrounding area host approximately 7,000 residents, distributed across villages including Bunyamisimbwa, Kahunju, Kamanyola, Kasebunga, Kitchanga, Moka, Nyamimba, and Tuonane.

== History ==
=== The FDLR: Forces Démocratiques de Libération du Rwanda ===
The Forces Démocratiques de Libération du Rwanda (FDLR) originated as a political-military movement formed in 2000 by Hutu rebels involved in the 1994 Rwandan genocide. During the First Congo War (1996–1997), the Rwandan army dismantled refugee camps in eastern Congo that housed Hutu refugees, including former members of the Forces Armées Rwandaises (FAR). In response, these rebels established the Armée de Libération du Rwanda (ALIR), a precursor to the FDLR, with the stated aim of overthrowing Rwanda’s post-genocide government and reinstating Hutu rule. The group later adopted the alias FOCA (Forces Combattantes Abacunguzi), derived from the Kinyarwanda term for "liberators" or "saviors."

Initially, the FDLR's presence in the Democratic Republic of the Congo (DRC) was intended to be temporary, leveraging the region's vast forests and remote terrain to regroup and plan a potential coup in Rwanda. However, the group entrenched itself over time, exploiting the DRC's instability.

==== Structure and operations ====
As of 2009, the FDLR-FOCA was organized into three brigades commanded by 'Colonel' Mutima, 'Colonel' Sadiki, and 'Colonel' Omega, with an estimated 3,000–4,500 combatants (Mercier 2009). The group attempted alliances with local militias like the Mayi-Mayi Kifufua, Simba, and Tseka, but these partnerships proved unstable, often collapsing over disputes related to mining access.

==== Impact in Walikale ====
The FDLR remains the most organized and influential armed group in Walikale Territory. However, prolonged conflict, reliance on subsistence survival tactics (many members live year-round in forests), and disillusionment among rank-and-file fighters—who realized their leaders (wanted for genocide) had no intention of returning to Rwanda—have eroded cohesion.

=== FDLR Operational Zones in Walikale ===
The FDLR exerts control over expansive areas of Walikale, including:

- A corridor stretching east from Oninga (near Lubutu) to Walowa Yungu (Mpito/Ntoto).
- Western sections of the southern axis bordering Kahuzi-Biega National Park.

Key Bases (2009):

- Southern Sector:
  - Isangi (near the Lukele River, 5 hours from Itebero Market).
  - Mpenbenema, Luenge (toward South Kivu), and Kamale (toward Shabunda).
- Eastern Sector:
  - Kabale Forest (between Luberick and Ntoto).
  - After FARDC operations displaced the group from Ntoto, FDLR forces relocated 30 km east to Ishunga (Mutshéri locality), leaving only a military police unit under 'Major Eric' in Ntoto.

=== Mining activities ===
FDLR-controlled zones encompass isolated forests and artisanal mining sites, governed by the group's parallel authority. Key mining areas include:

- Bakano Area: Cassiterite, coltan, and gold mines at Isangi (8 sites) and Mpango (2 sites).
- Ihana Area: Three sites producing gold and cassiterite.
- Luberick Area: Bana Mutati (gold, cassiterite) and Walowa (cassiterite, coltan).

Extracted minerals are smuggled to Goma via Masisi Territory. Access to these sites requires a flight from Goma to Walikale Centre, followed by a 6+ hour trek by motorcycle or foot.

=== Mayi-Mayi Simba ===
The Mayi-Mayi Simba emerged during the 1964 Lumumbist rebellions, initially espousing communitarian ideals. By the 2000s, their focus shifted to resource predation. Active in northern Walikale near Lubutu and Maniema (Oninga region), their influence has waned in recent years. They occasionally collaborate with the Mayi-Mayi Tseka or FDLR, notably in attacks on strategic sites like the Bisié mine.

=== Mayi-Mayi Kifuafua ===
Originally a self-defense militia against the Congrès National pour la Défense du Peuple (CNDP) in South Kivu's Ufamando region, the Mayi-Mayi Kifuafua relocated to southern Walikale. They control the Chambucha-Karete axis, a critical trade route linking Bukavu to Walikale. The group is fractured into two factions:

- 'Colonel' Delphin Bahenda (Walowa Loanda):
  - Engages in limited cooperation with MONUSCO and FARDC but prioritizes personal enrichment through looting and exploiting aid.
- 'Colonel' Jules (Walowa Ubora):
  - Refuses collaboration unless granted the rank of General, aligning opportunistically with the FDLR. Joint attacks, including the October 29, 2009 massacre, underscore this faction’s volatility.

Ethnic tensions between Walowa Loanda and Walowa Ubora are linked to these divergent agendas.

=== Mayi-Mayi Tseka ===
The Mayi-Mayi Tseka claims to defend Walikale from "Tutsi invaders" but primarily engages in illicit mining. Formed by ore trader Tseka, displaced farmers, FARDC deserters, and ex-CNDP fighters, the group operates near the Bisié mining zone (north of Mubi and Ndjingala) along the Kisangani corridor.

== Territory ==
Walikale Territory is administratively divided into two collectivities: Bakano (4238 km^{2}) and Wanianga (19,237 km^{2}). These are further subdivided into 15 groupements (administrative units) comprising 90 localities. Covering 39.46% of Nord-Kivu Province, Walikale is the largest territory in the province by land area.

=== Borders ===
Walikale is bordered by:

- Lubero Territory to the north.
- Rutshuru Territory and Masisi Territory to the east.
- Tshopo Province and Maniema Province to the west.
- South Kivu Province to the south.

=== Security context ===
Much of Walikale’s forests remain under the control of armed groups, including remnants of the Interahamwe (linked to the 1994 Rwandan genocide) and militias formerly led by Laurent Nkunda. These groups have displaced significant portions of the population to urban centers, terrorizing rural communities through robbery, violence, and illegal poaching of protected wildlife.

=== Ecology ===
Walikale features diverse terrestrial and freshwater ecosystems:

- Transitional forests dominate the northeast.
- Wet tropical forests and cultivated farmland characterize the southeast.
- Gilbertiodendron and Uapaca tree species mark forests extending to the province’s western edge.

Since 1975, the territory’s southwestern corner has been incorporated into Kahuzi-Biéga National Park, a UNESCO World Heritage Site known for its biodiversity and endangered eastern lowland gorillas.

== Food insecurity and emergency ==
As of 2011, 55% of Walikale's population was impacted by the protracted crisis in North Kivu, which evolved from a security emergency into a severe food crisis. Years of recurrent conflict have heightened vulnerabilities, disrupted socioeconomic systems, and destabilized livelihoods. While not yet classified as a humanitarian emergency, Walikale’s instability poses critical risks to food security, necessitating urgent intervention.

This protracted crisis exacerbates but does not solely explain food insecurity. Root causes—both historical and structural—vary across regions. Unlike conflicts where armed groups directly trigger food shortages, Walikale’s challenges stem from interconnected systemic issues, including land disputes, ethnic tensions, and resource exploitation.

=== Historical causes ===
- Disruption of Customary Land Rights: The Bakajika Law (1966), enacted during Mobutu Sese Seko's regime, nationalized land and centralized authority over land allocation. This eroded traditional land tenure systems, sparking unresolved conflicts over land ownership and access.
- Colonial and Postcolonial Ethnic Segregation: Ethnic marginalization, rooted in colonial policies and perpetuated under Mobutu, denied citizenship and land access to certain groups. This exclusion fueled ethnic tensions and the rise of self-defense militias.
- Post-War Immigration and Conflict: The First and Second Congo Wars (1996–2003) triggered mass immigration, notably of Hutu refugees linked to the 1994 Rwandan genocide. Denied land rights, some groups—including the FDLR—resorted to armed rebellion and resource predation, destabilizing local economies.

=== Structural causes ===
- Kahuzi-Biega National Park Expansion: The park's 1975 extension encroached on ancestral lands without community consultation or compensation. Displaced populations turned to artisanal mining or armed groups, exacerbating land conflicts and internal displacement.
- Forest Density and Armed Group Activity: Walikale's vast forests provide refuge for armed factions, complicating stabilization efforts and perpetuating insecurity.
- Internally Displaced Persons (IDPs): Host communities, already resource-constrained, struggle to support IDPs, straining food supplies and livelihoods.
- Shift from Farming to Mining: Mining's profitability and relative safety lure farmers away from agriculture, reducing food production amid rising demand.
- Land Access Challenges: Armed groups routinely seize crops and livestock, forcing communities to abandon remote fields. Women, primary agricultural laborers, face heightened risks of violence.
- Infrastructure Deficits: Lack of veterinary services, disease surveillance, and farming tools hinders agricultural productivity and food security.
- Market Isolation: Poor road networks isolate communities, limiting access to markets. This inflates food prices, restricts trade, and perpetuates malnutrition in remote areas.

== Politics ==
=== Political Representation ===
Walikale Territory is represented in the National Assembly of the Democratic Republic of the Congo by two deputies:

- Elysée Munembwe (Alliance pour le Renouveau du Congo, ARC)
- Juvenal Munubo (Union pour la Nation Congolaise, UNC)

=== Post-war context ===
Following the Congolese Wars (1996–2003), Walikale experienced relative calm despite persistent armed group activities. While "food lootings" and illegal mining by factions continued, open conflict between groups diminished. Neither the Congolese Armed Forces (FARDC) nor the United Nations Mission in the Congo (MONUC) intervened significantly during this period.

=== FDLR's parallel governance ===
By 2008, the Democratic Forces for the Liberation of Rwanda (FDLR) had entrenched itself as a parallel authority in Walikale, described by the Pole Institute as a "state within a state" (Rudahigwa, 2008). Key features included:

- Taxation System: The FDLR imposed levies on local harvests and village populations, claiming "protection" in return.
- Economic Diversification: Beyond mineral exploitation, the group engaged in farming, trade, and even built social infrastructure like hospitals.
- Stability Trade-Off: Despite depriving communities of resources, FDLR control reduced direct violence, enabling limited agricultural production and market access.

=== Military Operations: Umoja Wetu, Kimia II, and Amani Leo ===
In 2009, Rwandan President Paul Kagame and Congolese President Joseph Kabila launched Umoja Wetu ("Our Unity" in Swahili), a joint military offensive to dismantle the FDLR. While initially disruptive, the operation failed to neutralize the group. By March 2009, FDLR reprisals triggered a humanitarian crisis in Walikale, marked by food shortages and escalating violence.

Subsequent operations (Kimia II and Amani Leo), led by FARDC with MONUC/MONUSCO support, worsened instability:

- Civilian Targeting: Civilians became tools of war, facing massacres, rape, and village destruction.
- Economic Collapse: Armed groups shifted from taxation to direct looting, destabilizing food production and trade networks.

=== 2011 Elections and Resurgence of Conflict ===
The November 2011 elections reignited FDLR activity, fueled by opposition to Kabila’s alliance with Kagame. Local NGOs reported:

- Political Retaliation: FDLR intensified attacks on civilians and FARDC in protest of Kabila's reelection.
- Opposition Alliances: Some opposition factions allegedly aligned with FDLR and Mayi-Mayi militias, exacerbating tensions.
