= Lubutu Territory =

Lubutu Wilaya ya Lubutu (Swahili)
- Territory
- Interactive map of Lubutu
- Location in DR Congo
- Coordinates: 0.747°S 26.575°E
- Country: DR Congo
- Province: Maniema
- Time zone: UTC+2 (CAT)

Lubutu is a territory in Maniema province of the Democratic Republic of the Congo. The territory contains the southern portion of Maiko National Park. It is bordered to the north and west by Tshopo Province, to the east by North Kivu, and it is bordered to the south by Punia Territory, separated by the Lowa river. The main roads in the territory are the N3 and N31 highways, which intersect at the town of Lubutu. South of the village of Tingi-Tingi, a widened section of the N3 serves as the Tingi-Tingi Airport.

As of the 2018 election, it is divided into one commune, two sectors, and 26 groupings:

- Lubutu Territory
  - Lubutu Commune
  - Bitule Sector
    - Babongena Grouping
    - Babute Grouping
    - Babutukani Grouping
    - Bamugu I Grouping
    - Banango Grouping
    - Bbatikamwanga Grouping
    - Batike Grouping
    - Lubilinga Grouping
    - Mandimba Grouping
    - Okoku Grouping
    - Osele Grouping
    - Twabinga Grouping
  - Obokote Sector
    - Babogombe I Grouping
    - Babogombe II Grouping
    - Babokote Grouping
    - Babondjele Grouping
    - Babundji Grouping
    - Babusoko Grouping
    - Bamandea Grouping
    - Banali Grouping
    - Banenu Grouping
    - Kalombenyama Grouping
    - Kayumba Grouping
    - Misingi Grouping
    - Mukwanyama Grouping
    - Musafiri Grouping
