= Numbi =

Numbi may refer to:

- Denis Kalume Numbi, Interior Minister of the Democratic Republic of the Congo
- John Numbi, Inspector General of the Democratic Republic of the Congo police
- Numbi (town), a town in South Kivu, Democratic Republic of the Congo
- Numbi numbi, a sinkhole in Northern Territory, Australia
