= Kenya Institute of Security and Criminal Justice =

University in Kenya

- Institut d’étude sur la justice pénale du Kenya
- Motto: « In search of Justice »
- Type: Public institution
- Established: 2002
- Academic staff: 200
- Students: 6,000
- Location: Nairobi, Nairobi, Kenya
- Campus: Bungoma
- Language: English
- Website: www.kiscj.ac.ke

The Kenya Institute of Security and Criminal Justice (KISCJ) is a public institution established in 2002 in Nairobi, Kenya.

== Overview ==
The Kenya Institute of Security and Criminal Justice began in 2002, offering programs in security, criminology, and forensic science. To pave the way for police and other disciplined forces to access education, it offers programs from the certificate level to the diploma level, with progressive advancement possible up to the bachelor's degree level. Initially, KISCJ started with 8 students pursuing a certificate in criminology and forensics in Nairobi, and in 2003, it introduced diploma programs in various fields. Currently, it has more than 2000 students.

== Faculties ==
As of 2020, the Kenya Institute of Security and Criminal Justice has over 35 departments across its 10 campuses in Kenya:

- Security Management
- Disaster Management
- National Security
- Counter Terrorism and Organized Crime
- Corporate Security
- Criminology
- Fingerprint and Biometric Technology
- Anti-Money Laundering
- Forensic Accounting
- Computer Forensics
- VIP Protection
- Police Science and Crime Management
- Traffic Safety Management
- Airport and Aviation Security
- Marine and Port Security
- Risk Management
- Terrorism and Counter Terrorism
- Crime Prevention
- Diplomacy and International Relations
- Forensic and Criminal Investigation
- Psychology and Criminology
- Criminal Justice Administration and Management
- Probation and After Care Services Management
- Correctional Services Management
- Forensic Psychology and Criminology
- Child Forensic Studies: Psychology & Law
- Forensic Psychology
- Penology
- Forensic Investigation
- Wildlife Forensics
- Intelligence Management
- Law
- Penology and Correctional Science
- Police Leadership and Management
- Public Administration
- Electronic Security and Emergency Systems

== Notable people ==
=== Notable alumni ===
- Steve Wembi, investigative journalist and Congolese criminologist.
- Stephen Musyoki Munyao, investigative criminologist.
- Aden Issack, founder and director of TokenPesa Blockchain Ltd.

== See also ==
- International University of East Africa
- University of Nairobi
