= Isaac Kalonji =

Congolese Protestant minister and statesman

President of the Senate of the Democratic Republic of the Congo
- In office November 1962 – October 1965
- Preceded by: Victor Koumorico
- Succeeded by: Sylvestre Mudingayi

Personal details
- Born: 9 September 1915 Lusambo, Belgian Congo
- Died: 3 August 2009 (aged 93) Johannesburg, South Africa
- Party: Fédération des Association de Ressortissments du Kasai au Katanga; Convention Nationale Congolaise; Parti Démocrate Social Chrétien

Military service
- Allegiance: Congo
- Branch/service: Force Publique
- Years of service: 1940

Isaac Kalonji Mutambayi (9 September 1915 – 3 August 2009) was a Congolese Protestant minister and statesman who served as the President of the Senate of the Democratic Republic of the Congo from 1962 until 1965. He was one of the few politicians to serve the country continuously from its independence in 1960 until its democratisation in the 1990s.

== Early life ==
Isaac Kalonji was born on 9 September 1915 in Lusambo, Belgian Congo to a Muluba father and a Lulua mother. Early on in his life he was adopted by two American Baptist missionaries. They oversaw his upbringing and education until he was 9 years old, when the couple returned to the United States. Kalonji initiated his primary education in 1922 in Lusambo and underwent post-primary schooling in Luebo. By 1930 he was teaching in the same locale. Two years later he became secretary of the École Moyenne de Luebo and inspector of the École Normales Protestantes du Kasaï. In 1936 he was hired by an Italian firm and became a storekeeper. In 1940 he was promoted to the position of managing accountant of the venture. However, later that year the Italian merchant running the enterprise repatriated himself due to the development of World War II, and Kalonji lost his job. He subsequently enlisted in the Force Publique, serving for one year during the force's mobilisiation. In 1941 he moved to Élisabethville and became a clerk at the Banque Belge d'Afrique. He remained in the city until 1959, running several successful business ventures.

In 1953 Kalonji founded the Fédération des Ressortissants du Kasai. He traveled to Belgium in 1954 and toured the United States from December 1956 to March 1957. In September 1958 Kalonji led several other Baluba in creating the Fédération des Association de Ressortissments du Kasai au Katanga (FEDEKA) to oppose the Confédération des associations tribales du Katanga (CONAKAT)'s perceived anti-Baluba bias and politically mobilise Katangese residents of Kasian origins.

== Senate career ==
Kalonji served as a delegate for the Katanga Cartel (an alliance between FEDEKA, BALUBAKAT, and ATCAR) at the Belgo-Congolese Round Table Conference in early 1960. Afterwards he ran the Cartel's office in Belgium for several months and attended the Economic Round Table Conference as an observer. In May he was elected provincial deputy in Katanga Province and then on 12 June as senator on a non-customary, FEDEKA ticket. Kalonji dropped the former office to hold the latter. Prime Minister Patrice Lumumba nominated him as State Commissioner for Kasaï Province in the first government of the independent Congo. The Senate rejected all of Lumumba's nominees for state commissioner on the grounds that the provincial governments had not been adequately consulted on the selections. As the country fell into crisis, Kalonji's position in national politics became tenuous due to his mixed ethnicity and the fact that he adhered to Lumumba's beliefs. He was opposed to the Katangese secession. In October he was made a member of a commission assembled by Lumumba (then deposed) tasked with managing his relations with the United Nations Operation in the Congo.

In July 1961 Kalonji was elected First Vice President of the Senate. That year he played a significant role in attempting to reconcile the Luba and Lulua tribes and attended the Eurafrican Interparliamentary Conference of Strasbourg on the Association of African Countries in the Common Market. In November 1962 Kalonji became President of the Senate, having his mandate of office renewed in March and September 1963. He later became the secretary general of the Convention Nationale Congolaise (CONACO). He was reelected senator in 1965, representing the province of South Kasai. His presidency of the Senate ended in October 1965 when he was unexpectedly defeated for reelection by Sylvestre Mudingayi of the Front Démocratique Congolais, 57 votes to 54. During the Second Republic he was awarded the Grand Cordon of the National Order of the Leopard.

== Later life ==
Kalonji assisted Joseph Iléo in founding the Parti Démocrate Social Chrétien as the Congo began democratising. He served as the first president of the Conference Nationale Souveraine in 1991, though he was later replaced at the behest of opposition delegates, who regarded him as too close to Mobutu. With this political activity, he became one of the few politicians to be continuously active in the Congo from its independence in 1960 until the 1990s. Following the end of the Conference in 1992 Kalonji moved to Johannesburg. He died there on 3 August 2009.

== Bibliography ==
- Bonyeka, Bomandeke (1992). Le Parlement congolais sous le régime de la Loi fondamentale (in French). Kinshasa: Presses universitaire du Zaire. OCLC 716913628.
- Chomé, Jules (1966). Moise Tshombe et l'escroquerie katangaise (in French). Brussels: Éditions de la Fondation J. Jacquemotte. OCLC 919889. Archived from the original on 2021-11-10.
- Études africaines du CRISP (in French). Vol. 92–101. Brussels: Centre de recherche et d'information socio-politiques. 1969.
- Gérard-Libois, Jules (1966). Katanga Secession (translated ed.). Madison: University of Wisconsin Press. OCLC 477435.
- Kashamura, Anicet (1966). De Lumumba aux colonels (in French). Paris: Buchet. OCLC 465788990.
- Kennes, Erik (2009). Fin du cycle post-colonial au Katanga, RD Congo. Rébellions, sécession et leurs mémoires dans la dynamique des articulations entre l'Etat central et l'autonomie régionale 1960-2007 (PhD thesis) (in French). Université Laval. OCLC 1048412016. Archived from the original on 2020-07-08.
- Kisangani, Emizet Francois (2016). Historical Dictionary of the Democratic Republic of the Congo (4 ed.). Rowman & Littlefield. ISBN 9781442273160.
- Merriam, Alan P. (1961). Congo: Background of Conflict. Northwestern University Press.
- Mulumba, Mabi; Makombo, Mutamba (1986). Cadres et dirigeants au Zaïre, qui sont-ils?: dictionnaire biographique (in French). Centre de recherches pédagogiques.
- Mwanyimi-Mbomba, Mandjumba (1985). Chronologie générale de l'histoire du Zaïre: des origines à nos jours (in French). Centre de recherches pédagogiques.
- O'Ballance, Edgar (1999). The Congo-Zaire Experience, 1960–98 (illustrated ed.). Springer. ISBN 9780230286481.
- Omasombo Tshonda, Jean, ed. (2018). Haut-Katanga : Lorsque richesses économiques et pouvoirs politiques forcent une identité régionale (PDF). Provinces (in French). Vol. 1. Tervuren: Musée royal de l’Afrique centrale. ISBN 978-9-4926-6907-0.
- Young, Crawford (2015). Politics in Congo: Decolonization and Independence (reprint ed.). Princeton University Press. ISBN 978-1-4008-7857-4.
