= List of presidents of the Senate of the Democratic Republic of the Congo =

The president of the Senate of the Democratic Republic of the Congo is the presiding officer in the Senate of the Democratic Republic of the Congo.

Below is a list of office-holders:

Name	Entered office	Left office	Reference(s)
Joseph Iléo	June 1960	September 1960	
Victor Koumorico	July 1961	November 1962	
Isaac Kalonji	November 1962	October 1965	
Sylvestre Mudingayi	October 1965	24 June 1967	
Senate abolished	24 June 1967	7 April 2002	
Pierre Marini Bodho	7 April 2002	11 May 2007	
Léon Kengo Wa Dondo	11 May 2007	5 April 2019	
Léon Mamboleo	5 April 2019	27 July 2019	Acting
Alexis Thambwe Mwamba	27 July 2019	5 February 2021	
Léon Mamboleo	5 February 2021	1 March 2021	Acting
Modeste Bahati Lukwebo	2 March 2021	19 February 2024	
Mossaï Sanguma	20 February 2024	13 May 2024	Acting
Pascal Kinduelo Lumbu	14 May 2024	11 Aug 2024	Acting
Jean-Michel Sama Lukonde Kyenge	12 Aug 2024	Incumbent	
