= Alexis Thambwe Mwamba =

Congolese politician

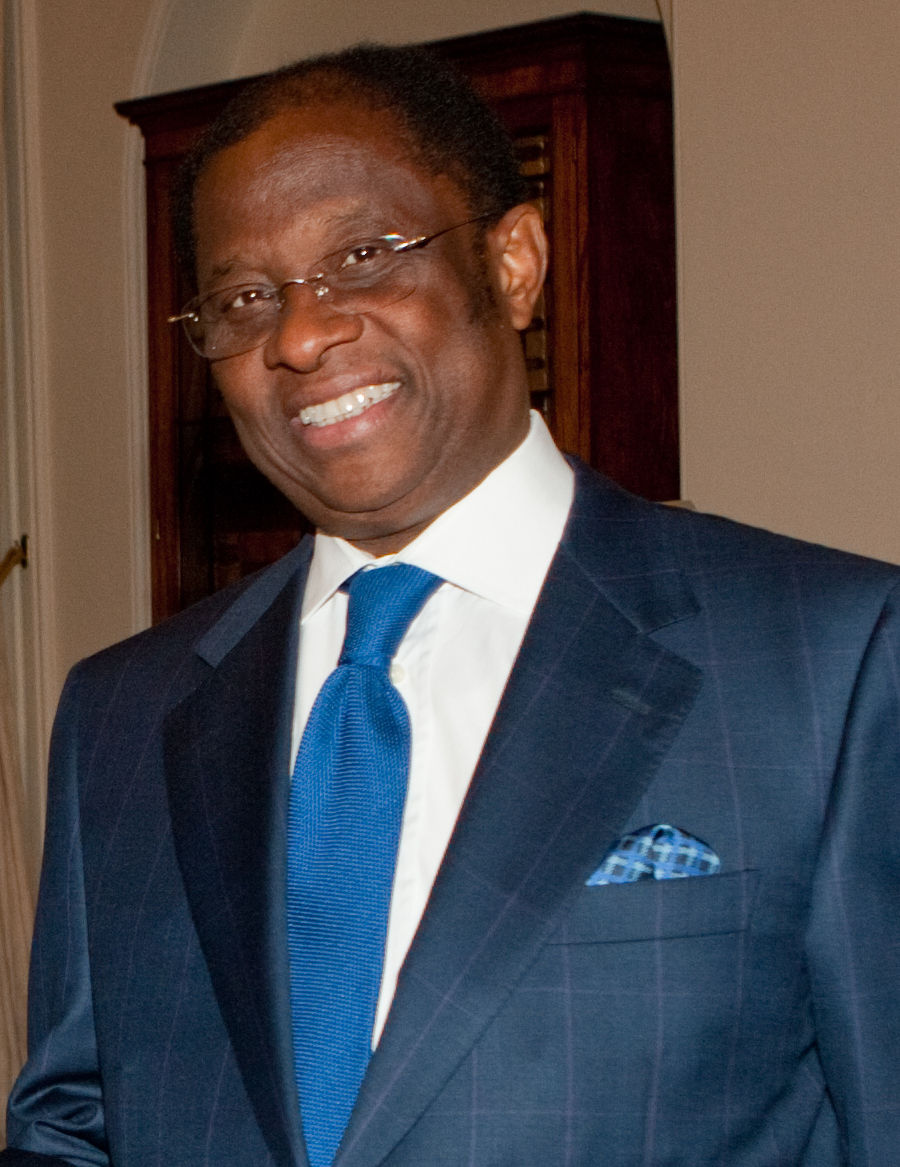
- Thambwe Mwamba in 2010

President of the Senate of Congo
- In office 27 July 2019 – 5 February 2021
- Preceded by: Léon Mamboleo
- Succeeded by: Modeste Bahati Lukwebo

Minister of Planning and Reconstruction
- In office 2003–2006

Member of the National Assembly for Kindu
- Incumbent
- Assumed office 2006

Minister of Foreign Affairs and International Cooperation
- In office October 2008 – April 2012
- Preceded by: Antipas Mbusa
- Succeeded by: Raymond Tshibanda

Personal details
- Born: May 6, 1943 (age 82) Longa, Maniema province

Alexis Thambwe Mwamba (born May 6, 1943) is a Congolese politician who has assumed various political roles and offices since the early 1980s going from Minister of Public Works, Minister of State Portfolio, Minister of Transportation, Minister of Planning, Minister of Foreign Affairs and recently in December 2014, he was appointed Minister of Justice of the Democratic Republic of the Congo.

Born in Longa, Maniema province, Thambwe Mwamba is a practicing lawyer in the Democratic Republic of Congo and possibly one of the longest serving public servants of the country from the time he was first appointed Minister of Public Works in 1985 serving in the government of Mobutu Sese Seko.

During the Second Congo War, Thambwe Mwamba was a member of the rebel Movement for the Liberation of Congo led by Jean-Pierre Bemba that controlled much of the north of the country. A Belgian magistrate investigated Thambwe Mwamba for money laundering, over payments he allegedly received to finance the war from international trafficking of coltan.

He was Minister of Planning and Reconstruction in the Transitional Government from 2003 to 2006. He was elected as an independent member of the National Assembly for Kindu in the 2006 general election and joined the government under President Joseph Kabila. He was appointed Foreign Minister.

In late August 2009, shots were fired at his house as a threat against testifying in the trial at the International Criminal Court of Bemba.

27 July 2019 Alexis Thambwe Mwamba was elected President of the Senate. On 5 February 2021, he resigned from this position, thereby avoiding an anticipated removal process.

== See also ==
- Steve Wembi
