= National Road 3 (Democratic Republic of the Congo) =

Road in the Democratic Republic of the Congo

Route information
- Length: 583 km (362 mi)

Major junctions
- N5 in Bukavu; N2 in Bukavu; N31 in Lubutu; N4 in Kisangani

Location
- Country: Democratic Republic of the Congo

Highway system
- Transport in the Democratic Republic of the Congo

National Road 3 (N3) is a road in the Democratic Republic of the Congo. It runs from the city of Bukavu on the south end of Lake Kivu to the city of Kisangani.

The road begins northwest of Bukavu at Miti, travels 75 kilometres (47 mi) northwest to Hombo at the border of North Kivu. In North Kivu it travels 84 kilometres (52 mi) to Walikale and a further 102 kilometres (63 mi) to Oso at the border of Maniema. It then runs 93 kilometres (58 mi) to Lubutu, 132 kilometres (82 mi) to Pene Tungu and finally 97 kilometres (60 mi) to Kisangani. Kisangani is a river port, the farthest navigable point on the Congo River from the capital Kinshasa. Riverboats and small ships link Kisangani to Kinshasa.

The road had deteriorated over the course of the First and Second Congo Wars and became impassable on the unpaved sections. The section north of Walikale was rebuilt by the German NGO Welthungerhilfe (French: Agro Action Allemande), which began work in 2000, and was about a quarter complete by June 2006, and about 550 km were completed by 2010.

UNESCO's World Heritage Committee pushed to have rehabilitation work on RN3 delayed in order to have more time to address concerns about environmental impacts on the Kahuzi-Biéga National Park.

Locations (east to west)
Location	Province
Bukavu	South Kivu
Bunyakiri	South Kivu
Chambucha	North Kivu
Walikale	North Kivu
Lubutu	Maniema
Kisangani	Tshopo
