= Sylvestre Mudingayi =

Congolese politician

Sylvestre Kongolo Mudingayi
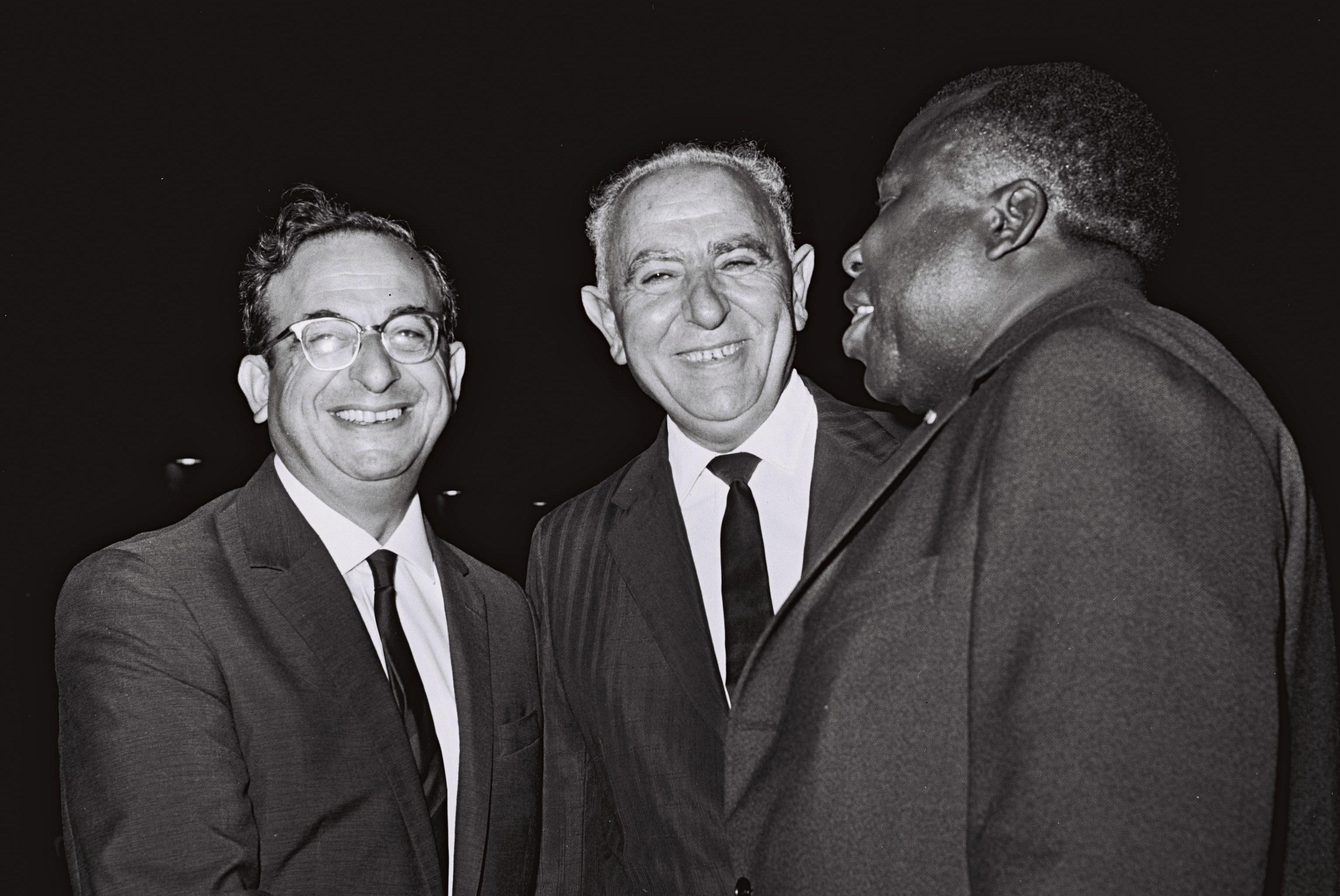
- Sylvestre Mudingayi in Israel, August 1966

President of the Senate of the Democratic Republic of the Congo
- In office September 1965 – 24 June 1967
- Preceded by: Isaac Kalonji
- Succeeded by: position abolished (Note: The Senate was permanently dissolved and was not reinstated until 2003 under the chairmanship of Pierre Marini Bodho.)

Personal details
- Born: 11 November 1912; Lusambo, Kasai Province, Belgian Congo
- Died: 23 December 1983; Kinshasa
- Political party: Parti National du Progrès; Front Démocratique Congolais

Sylvestre Mudingayi (11 November 1912 – 23 December 1983) was a Congolese politician who served as the President of the Senate of the Democratic Republic of the Congo from October 1965 until June 1967.

== Biography ==
Sylvestre Mudingayi was born on 11 November 1912 in Lusambo, Kasai Province, Belgian Congo to a Luba family. In 1932 he became a chief clerk at the Banque du Congo Belge. He was a member of the évolué social class. In 1945 he chaired the Cercle d'Agrément Prince Léopold III de Lusambo.

=== Political career ===
Mudingayi was classified by Christian missionaries as a "socialist" due to his advocacy for the establishment of secular schools. In 1953 he traveled to Belgium where he was received by the Liberal Party. In March 1959 he was appointed by the Governor-General of the Congo to serve on the consultative Conseil de Gouvernement. Mudingayi later became president of the Kasai chapter of the Parti National du Progrès (PNP). He founded and became editor of the leftist anti-clericalist newspaper La Lumière, a bimonthly publication of the party.

Mudingayi participated in the Belgo-Congolese Round Table Conference of 1960 that earned the Congo's independence. While campaigning for the PNP in the Luputa region of Kasai in March for the upcoming elections, he was assaulted by opposing political activists. His injuries were severe and he was forced to make a near-total withdrawal from politics.

In September 1965 Mudingayi was elected President of the Senate as a member of the Front Démocratique Congolais (FDC) in a surprise victory over the incumbent, Isaac Kalonji, 57 votes to 54. He served until the enactment of a new constitution on 24 June 1967.
