= Chambucha =

- Town
- Location within Democratic Republic of the Congo
- Coordinates: 1.798°S 28.427°E
- Country: Democratic Republic of the Congo
- Province: North Kivu
- Territory: Walikale Territory
- Time zone: UTC+2 (CAT)

Chambucha is a location in Walikale Territory, North Kivu, Democratic Republic of the Congo. It lies along the N3 highway just north of the border of South Kivu.
