= Victor Koumorico =

Congolese politician

President of the Senate of the Democratic Republic of the Congo
- In office 25 July 1961 – September 1962
- Deputy: Isaac Kalonji
- Preceded by: Joseph Iléo
- Succeeded by: Isaac Kalonji

President of Lac Léopold II Province
- In office September 1962 – December 1963
- Succeeded by: Gabriel Zagabie

Personal details
- Died: 22 June 1966; Léopoldville, Democratic Republic of the Congo
- Political party: UNILAC (Parti National du Progrès)

Victor Koumorico (also spelled Kumoriko, Komoriko, or Koumoriko) (died 22 June 1966) was a Congolese politician who served as President of the Senate of the Democratic Republic of the Congo from July 1961 until November 1962.

== Biography ==
Victor Koumorico belonged to the Ekonda ethnic group. He participated in the East African Campaign of World War I in German East Africa as a member of the Force Publique. He was the chief of a tribe. According to custom this position entitled him to six wives, but Koumorico only had two, saying it was "because I am a good Catholic."

=== Political career ===
In the first elections of the Republic of the Congo (Léopoldville) in 1960, Koumorico was elected as both a national deputy of the Oshwe Territory of the Lac Léopold II District and as a senator, serving on behalf of the UNILAC party. At the time he was the oldest member of the Senate. He withdrew his mandate as a deputy. Koumorico led a delegation to Élisabethville in early 1961 to negotiate with the leaders of the secessionist State of Katanga on behalf of the central government of the Congo. He participated in the Coquilhatville Conference in May 1961. On 25 July at the Lovanium Conclave Koumorico was elected President of the Senate. He served in the role until September 1962.

Koumorico strongly advocated for the creation of a new "Lac Léopold II Province" dominated by the Ekonda. Once the central government agreed to its creation, he presented himself as a candidate for the provincial presidency. He was given widespread support from local political leaders and subsequently became the first President of Lac Léopold II Province in September 1962. He terminated his senate mandate to focus on his provincial responsibilities. Over the course of 1963 the political situation in the province deteriorated due to disagreements on representation in the governing institutions and the location of the capital. Koumorico proposed a conference to reconcile differences and the creation of a new political party, the PANALAC. Despite initial receptiveness from opposition figures, Koumorico's political position continued to decline and by September a rival government had been formed. His government dissolved in December.

On 30 May 1964 Koumorico was appointed Extraordinary Commissionaire for Kivu Central and tasked with overseeing the central government's efforts to restore order in the region in the midst of the Simba rebellion. Following the 1965 general elections, he was made provisional President of the Senate while the senatorial elections and credentials were confirmed. After suffering from a long illness, Koumorico died in Léopoldville on 22 June 1966.
