= Modeste Bahati Lukwebo =

Congolese economist and politician

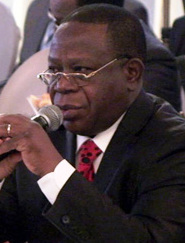

President of the Senate of the Democratic Republic of the Congo
- In office 2 March 2021 – 19 February 2024
- Preceded by: Léon Mamboleo
- Succeeded by: Mossaï Sanguma

Personal details
- Born: 1956 (age 69–70)

Modeste Bahati Lukwebo is an economist, businessperson and politician in the Democratic Republic of the Congo. He is president of the Alliance of Democratic Forces of Congo (AFDC). He was President of the Senate from March 2021 to February 2024.

== Biography ==
Bahati Lukwebo was born in 1956 in South Kivu.

Modeste Bahati Lukwebo established the ADFC in 2010. He was Minister of Employment, Labor and Social Welfare under president Joseph Kabila, with the AFDC forming a second plank of Kabila's Common Front for Congo.

However, in 2019 Bahati Lukwebo left Kabila's camp and moved closer to Félix Tshisekedi's Union for Democracy and Social Progress. After participating in the breakup between Kabila and Tshisekedi, he was one of the architects of the 'Sacred Union of the Nation'. On 31 December 2020 President Tshisekedi chose him to help form a new parliamentary majority. As negotiations proceeded for a 'Sacred Union' government, Bahati Lukwebo was on Tshisekedi's shortlist for the position of prime minister, though this went to Sama Lukonde Kyenge in February. On 2 March 2021 Bahati Lukwebo was elected president of the Senate, replacing Kabila's supporter Alexis Thambwe Mwamba.
