= Blood in the Mobile =

- Directed by: Frank Piasecki Poulsen
- Release date: 1 September 2010
- Country: Denmark

Blood in the Mobile is a 2010 documentary film by Danish film director Frank Piasecki Poulsen. The film addresses the issue of conflict minerals by examining illegal cassiterite mining in the North-Kivu province in eastern DR Congo. In particular, it focuses on the cassiterite mine in Bisie.

The film is co-financed by Danish, German, Finnish, Hungarian and Irish television, as well as the Danish National film board.

The film premiered in Denmark on 1 September 2010. During the making of the film Frank Piasecki Poulsen is working with communications professional and new media entrepreneur Mikkel Skov Petersen on the online campaign of the same name.

The campaign is addressing Poulsen and Petersens notion of the responsibility of the manufacturers of mobile phones on the situation in war torn eastern Congo. The project is collaborating with NGOs like Dutch-based Make It Fair and British-based Global Witness who are also engaged in changing the conduct of Western companies regarding the industrial use of minerals of unknown origin.

The cassiterite dug out in the illegal mines in North-Kivu is according to Danish corporate monitor organization Danwatch primarily purchased as tin by the electronics industry after processing in East Asia.

Apart from trying to raise awareness of the issue of illegal mining and alleged lack of corporate social responsibility from the mobile phone industry, the campaign is an attempt to experiment with new ways of building an audience and create additional funding for documentary films.

The production of the film and the campaign is run in association with Danish new media company Spacesheep, founded in 2009 by Poulsen and Petersen in association with major Danish independent TV and film production company Koncern.
