= Bisie =

Tin deposit in the Democratic Republic of the Congo

Bisie mine
- Location within Democratic Republic of the Congo
- Location: North Kivu, Democratic Republic of the Congo; 1°2′S 27°44′E
- Company: Alphamin Bisie Mining SA (ABM): Alpahmin Resources (84.14%); Industrial Development Corporation (10.86%); DRC government (5%)
- Website: alphaminresources.com/mpama-north/

Bisie, divided into Mpama North and Mpama South deposits, is a tin deposit in the Walikale territory of the province of North Kivu in the Democratic Republic of the Congo (DRC). The mine was formerly an illegal source of an estimated 15,000 tons of tin, or 4% of global production. In early 2018 artisanal mining activity has stopped, and Alphamin Resources Corp., an exploration company, based in Mauritius, is leading an exploration of the site.

== History ==
=== Artisanal mining (2003–2011) ===
Bisie mine was established after a hunter discovered cassiterite there, which led to a frenzy. Artisinal mining at Bisie began in 2003.

Following the Second Congo War, Mai Mai-allied militia in were to form the 85th brigade of the national army, receive training and then fragment when they deployed throughout the country. The militia refused to cooperate, however, and since then they controlled the production and transport of tin, and the economics of Bisie, and nearby Manoire village, under the supervision of Colonel Samy Matumo. The annual tin production of Bisie mine has been estimated as high $100 million. The militia extorted "taxes" on everything from entry to the mine to renting a mud hut for shelter for $50 a month. They also collect sales taxes from small peddlers, reportedly at $20 a week.

Tin was mined by hand through open-pit mining, and bags of tin that weighed 110 pounds (50 kg) or more were then dropped off at a central location, from which porters carried them on foot by individuals for over 30 miles (48 km), which typically took two days. When it arrived it was then transported to the village of Kilambo, where it was loaded into Soviet-style cargo planes, flown to Goma, and sold to international dealers, such as Malaysia Smelting Corporation.

The militia controlled the entire vicinity of Bisie and allowed entry only to those who paid the taxes. Mining and Processing Congo (MPC), a consortium of British and South African investors, bought mining rights for Bisie in 2006, but the militia thwarted their attempts to reach the area. They in the past have shot and injured people associated with the consortium. After they were forced to evacuate, MPC applied for Force Majeure, which was granted on 26 March 2009.

By July 2008, the mine was retaken by the DRC's military, but conditions under the FARDC were poor, with child labor and outbreaks of disease in the area.

The mine was intimately linked to world markets. In October 2008 the prices of tin increased 37% with news of fighting in the region. According to some observers, the failure to inaugurate legal forms of production indicated corruption at the regional and federal levels of the DRC.

In March 2009, the 85th FARDC Brigade was replaced by the 1st Brigade of ex-CNDP (Congrès National pour la Défense du Peuple) members; this was then renamed the 212th Brigade in September 2009. On 9 September 2010, President Kabila banned on all artisanal mining in Walikale territory. Two days later, he suspended all mining and mineral exports from North Kivu, South Kivu and Maniema Provinces.

This mining and export ban, together with the Dodd-Frank Wall Street Reform and Consumer Protection Act and pressure from the Organisation for Economic Co-operation and Development (OECD), caused buyers to buy less at lower prices. The Dodd-Frank legislation requires US-listed companies who obtain minerals from the DRC and adjoining countries, to implement due diligence measures. This legislation served as a catalyst for other international and regional initiatives to increase the accountability of corporations who source minerals from the eastern DRC and the wider region. The main buyers of cassiterite in the area, i.e. the Malaysian Smelting Corporation, various Chinese companies and Eurotrade International, boycotted Bisie ore, easy to identify due to its pink-red colour.

The mine was profiled in the 2010 documentary Blood in the Mobile.

Mineral production and trade slowed during Kabila's ban, but did not completely stop. Wimmer and Hilgert (2011) presented satellite images which show continued artisanal mining at Bisie. They estimated that the actual mining area expanded by 0.74 ha during the ban, which was lifted 10 March 2011.

By late May 2011, the DRC army completed its withdrawal from the Bisie tin mine.

=== Industrial mine (2011–present) ===
In August 2011, Alphamin Resources, a Canadian company, acquired a 70% interest in the Bisie Tin Project, and acquired the remaining 30% of the project in July 2012.

In 2012, the number of artisanal miners at the site had declined sharply, due in great part to the deep tunnels now needed to reach the ore. The Force Majeure was lifted at the Bisie Project in February 2012, and Alphamin Resources established a camp on the Bisie ridge and began exploratory drilling in July 2012.

Artisanal mining continuing on a smaller scale alongside Alphamin's exploration. However, after members of an artisanal cooperative destroyed Alphamin's camp on 16 July 2014, the cooperative's activities on the site were suspended. Alphamin rebuilt the camp and recommenced exploration campaign in September 2014.

== See also ==
- Rubaya mines
- Numbi (town)
- Resource War
- Conflict Minerals Law
