= Steve Wembi =

Investigative journalist

- Born: 20 July 1984 (age 41); Kindu, Maniema, Zaire
- Occupation: investigative journalist

Steve Wembi (born 20 July 1984) is an investigative journalist based in Kinshasa, Democratic Republic of the Congo and in Nairobi, Kenya. He has worked as a contributor for the New York Times, Al Jazeera and Xinhua (commonly known as the "New China News Agency") and he is the Managing Director of the Consulting Media Agency (CMA).

== Biography ==
Steve Wembi was born on 20 July 1984 in Kindu, in the province of Maniema in Zaire (now Democratic Republic of the Congo). In 1997, he underwent military training in Kamalenge when the rebellion Alliance of Democratic Forces for the Liberation of Congo (AFDL or ADFLC), led by Laurent-Désiré Kabila, before returning to secondary school at Ibanda Institute in Bukavu.

He graduated from high school and moved to Kinshasa in 2007 to continue his university studies, the first two years at the University of Kinshasa (UNIKIN) at the Faculty of Law. There he started his journalistic career as a correspondent in Kinshasa for the New China News Agency and worked for the agency media for ten years. He has also worked for Al Jazeera Television, Cable News Network (CNN) and as a reporter for Integrated Regional Information Networks (IRIN), The Economist, Financial Times, Norwegian Broadcasting Corporation and The Wall Street Journal.

In the eastern Democratic Republic of the Congo, Wembi covered several rebellions, including that of the March 23 Movement (M23) and the National Congress for the Defense of the People (French: Congrès national pour la défense du peuple, CNDP) but also, he frequented high risk areas, particular in Kasaï Province, a region where the two UN experts Zaida Catalan and Michael Sharp were killed in March 2017. That same year, he discovered more than 100 mass graves in Ngaza commune. Wembi holds a diploma in criminology from Kenya Institute of Security and Criminal Justice and since 2019, he is communication advisor to the president of the Senate of the Democratic Republic of the Congo, senator Alexis Thambwe Mwamba.

== Disappearance ==
On October 24, 2022, Wembi went missing after a meeting at the Léon hotel in Kinshasa. The government, and in particular, the National Intelligence Agency (Democratic Republic of the Congo), were blamed for his abduction, but Patrick Muyaya, the government's spokesperson, denied knowledge of his whereabouts, leading his family to fear he has been killed.

== Personal life ==
Wembi is married to Belinda Zamundu and has six children.
