= Provincial Assembly of Maniema =

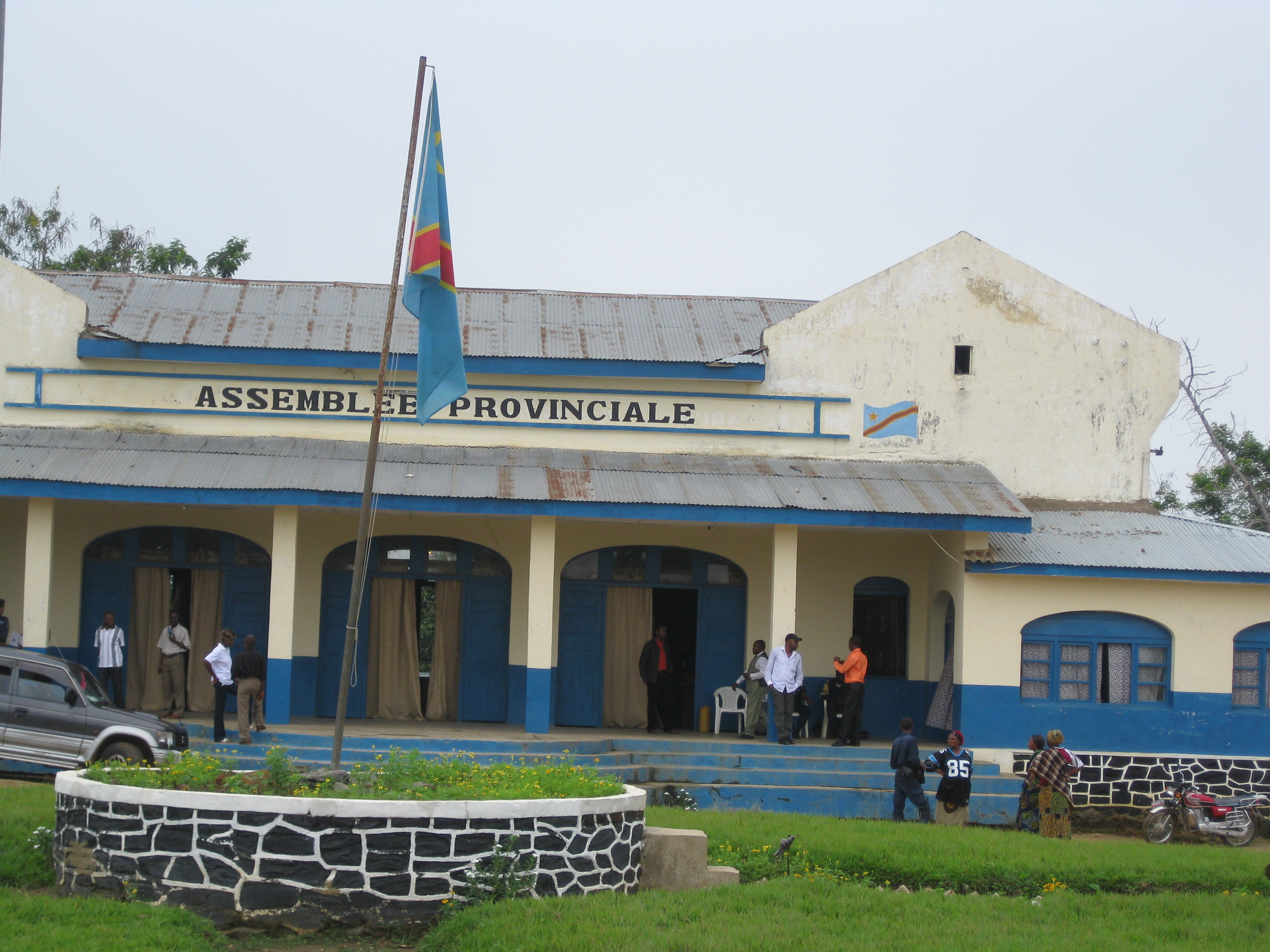
Building of the Provincial Assembly of Maniema, Kindu.

The Provincial Assembly of Maniema is the provincial legislature of Maniema.
