= Juvénal Munubo =

Juvenal Munubo
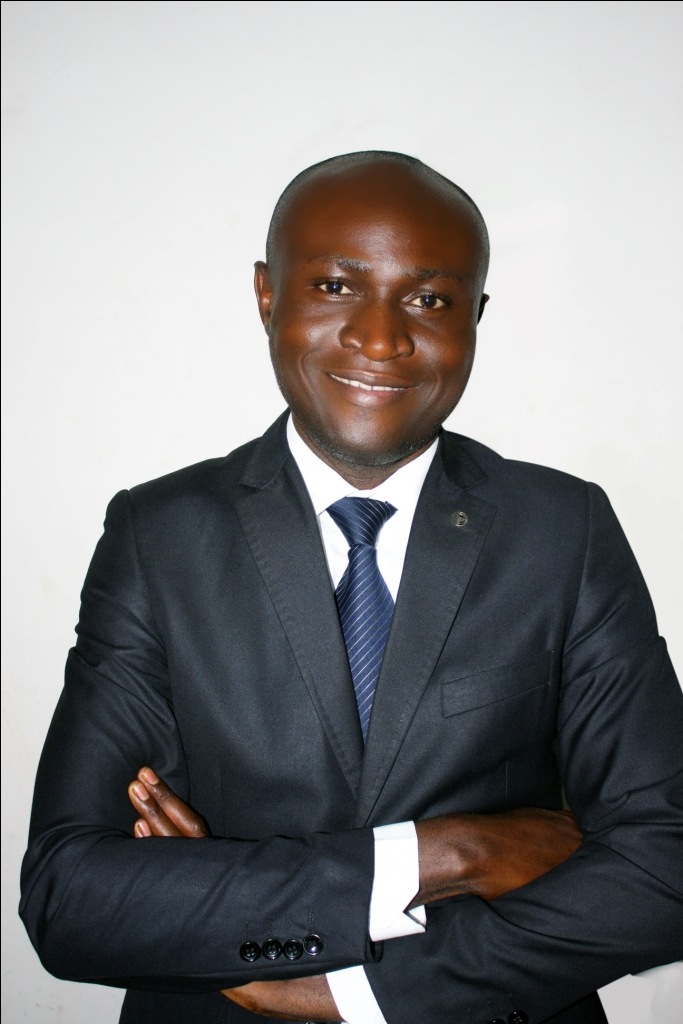

Member of the National Assembly
- Incumbent
- Assumed office 2011
- Constituency: Walikale

Personal details
- Born: 1 July 1979 (age 46)
- Party: Union for the Congolese Nation

Juvenal Munubo Mubi (born 1 July 1979) is a Congolese politician and Union for the Congolese Nation Member of the National Assembly of the Democratic Republic of the Congo.
