= Walikale =

Town in the North Kivu Province of the Democratic Republic of the Congo

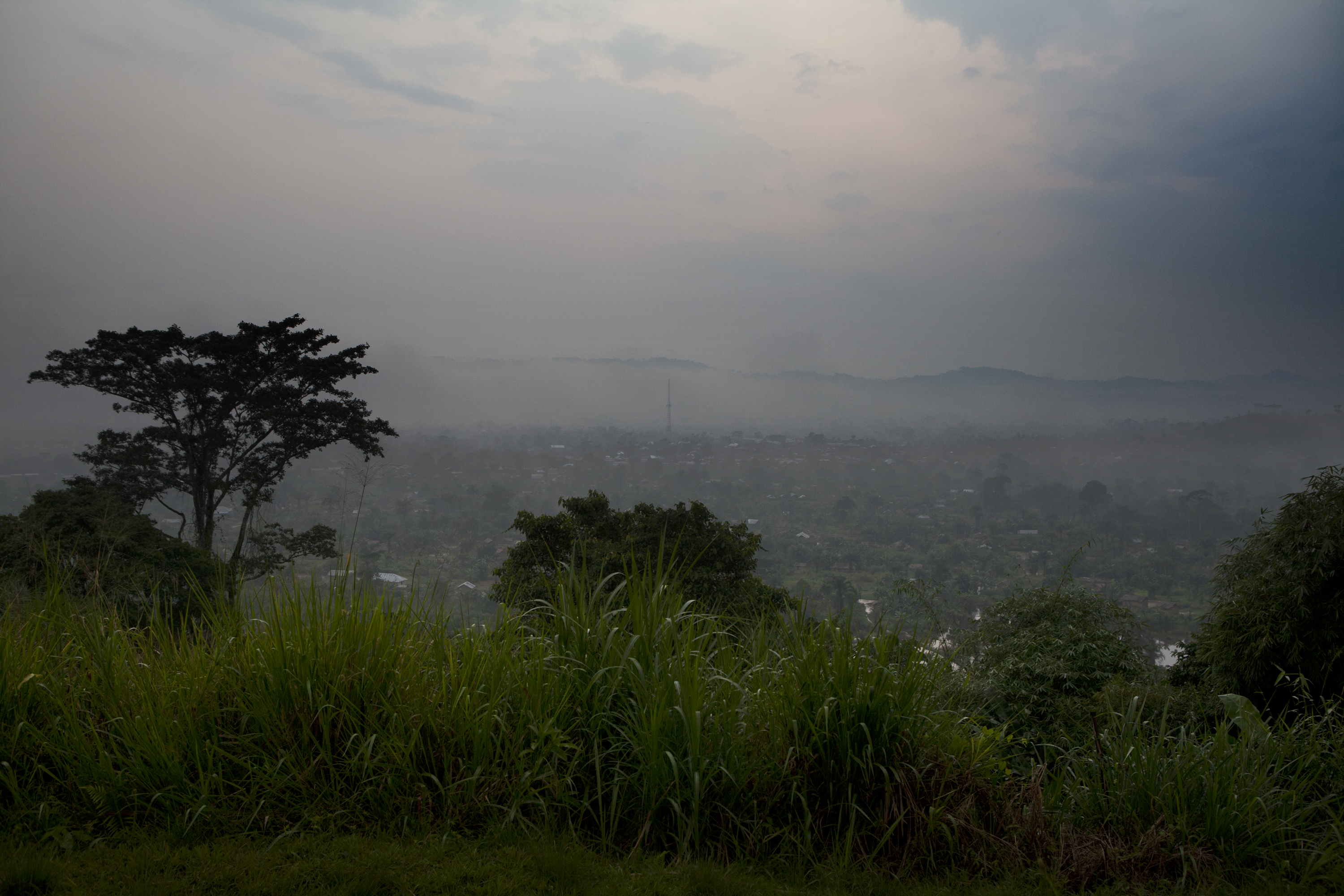
- Walikale in 2011

- Location in Democratic Republic of the Congo
- Coordinates: 1°25′34″S 28°4′12″E
- Country: Democratic Republic of the Congo
- Province: North Kivu
- Territory: Walikale

Walikale is a town in the North Kivu Province of the Democratic Republic of the Congo (DRC). It is the administrative center of the Walikale Territory.

Walikale is home to the largest tin deposits in the Congo and to some very large gold mines, as well. In particular, the Bisie mine is supposed to account for somewhere between 50 and 80% of tin exports from North Kivu. The control of Bisie mine is a main source of contention within the Congolese army, as it provides for upwards of $100,000 a month in taxes for local soldiers. This does not include the individual pits that some commanders control and or the kickbacks they get from trading houses.

== Timeline ==
- In Aug 2010, at least 179 women were raped by armed rebels around the small town of Ruvungi in Walikale Territory between July 30 and August 2.
- On 17 July 2012, Walikale town was taken over by rebel forces from local militia Mai Mai Raia Motumboki.
- On 10 June 2014, The administrator of Lubero Territory, Joy Bokele, requested assistance for six hundred displaced households who sought refuge two months ago in the south of the territory. These people came from Walikale where they had fled clashes between FDLR militia and Nduma défense of Congo (NDC) (NDC) Cheka. These internally displaced persons (IDPs) were grouped in several sites, including Kasuho, Bunyantenge and Njiapanda.
- On 30 July 2016, the United Nations Special Representative of the Secretary-General on Sexual Violence in Conflict, Zainab Hawa Bangura, called for the arrest of Ntabo Ntaberi Sheka for crimes against humanity, whose militia is allegedly responsible for the August 2010 rapes. The Congo issued an arrest warrant in 2011, but Sheka ran for office in November 2011 and remained at large for another six years before he surrendered to UN peacekeeping forces in 2017.
