= Gregoire Mirindi =

Member of the National Assembly
- Incumbent
- Assumed office 30 July 2006
- Constituency: Kalehe

Personal details
- Party: Union for the Congolese Nation

Gregoire Mirindi Carhangabo is a Congolese politician and Union for the Congolese Nation Member of the National Assembly of the Democratic Republic of the Congo.

He was previously aligned to the People's Party for Reconstruction and Democracy.
