= Numbi (town) =

- Location within Democratic Republic of the Congo
- Coordinates: 1.788°S 28.894°E
- Country: DR Congo
- Province: South Kivu
- Territory: Kalehe
- Chiefdom: Buhavu

Population (2014)
  - Total: 11,000
- Time zone: UTC+2 (CAT)

Numbi is a town in Kalehe Territory in South Kivu province in the Democratic Republic of the Congo.

== Town ==
The town is located up on a plateau in a remote area, only accessible on foot or motorcycle. It developed around mining in the early 2000s when global mining prices for minerals spiked. The population grew over the years, supplemented by a large number of internally displaced persons fleeing violence in the hinterlands.

In 2015, a solar-powered cell phone tower was carried 27 km by foot and brought cell phone service to the town for the first time. The commercial success of the original Vodacom tower led other carriers to also offer services in the town. There is a hospital in Numbi which treats about 2,300 patients a month for issues like childhood malnutrition.

== Mining ==
Geologically, the area falls into the Kibaran Belt, and has granite and pegmatitic rocks which contain ores of tin, tungsten, tantalum, and niobium. As of 2018, there were about 12 active sites for coltan and cassiterite, all conducted as artisanal open pit extraction from eluvial deposits.

As of 2010, smuggling from Numbi was common, with minerals carried out of the area nightly by small-time smugglers in 50 kg sacks. In an effort to clean up the industry, president Joseph Kabila announced a ban on mining in the eastern provinces. This was later lifted.

Around 2014 and 2015, there was a significant increase in tourmaline mining, reportedly employing the majority of miners at Numbi.

At least six of the mine sites near Numbi are covered by a mining permit (PE 2598) owned by Société Aurifère du Kivu et du Maniema (SAKIMA), first granted in April 1999. The six sites (Misumari, Fungamwaka, Madame, Mungwe, Koweit and Kajojo) were visited in a March 2015 validation process. These sites are mainly worked by the artisanal mining group Coopérative des Exploitants Artisanaux Miniers dans les Hauts Plateaux de Numbi – Buzi (COPAMIHANUBU). The exclusive right to buy minerals from these mines is owned by the company AMUR.

== Conflict ==
During the colonial period, the Havu Mwami Hubert Sangara, who had been taken prisoner by Kigeli IV Rwabugiri and raised in the Kingdom of Rwanda, sought to consolidate control over the Numbi area, and with the support from the Belgians, settled many Banyarwanda in the area of the mineral-rich cinq collines (five hills: Numbi, Lumbishi, Luzirandaka, Ngandjo and Shanje). Sangara's moves to bring the area under his control were resisted by the (Ba)tembo people who also sought control over the area.

Spillover violence from the 1993 war in Masisi Territory led to open conflict between the autochthonous Tembo people and the Banyarwanda who had previously lived in the same areas. Tembo fled the highlands, and the Banyarwanda achieved de facto local autonomy by recognizing the authority of Mwami Raymond Sangara, an ethnic Havu.

Mining at Numbi was a significant source of revenue for the rebel group Rally for Congolese Democracy (RCD) during the two Congo wars. A 2008 report from the NGO International Peace Information Service claimed income from the Numbi mines likely made its way to a variety of armed groups, including the PARECO, FDLR, and CNDP. As of 2012, several militia groups were active in the area, including Mai Mai Nyatura, Mai Mai Kichiriko and the Democratic Forces for the Liberation of Rwanda (FDLR).

In 2020, a group of 120 Nyatura militia stationed in Numbi who had previously surrendered to government forces decided to take up arms again after being treated poorly for about two months.

== See also ==
- Rubaya mines
- Bisie
- Lueshe mine
