= Pierre Marini Bodho =

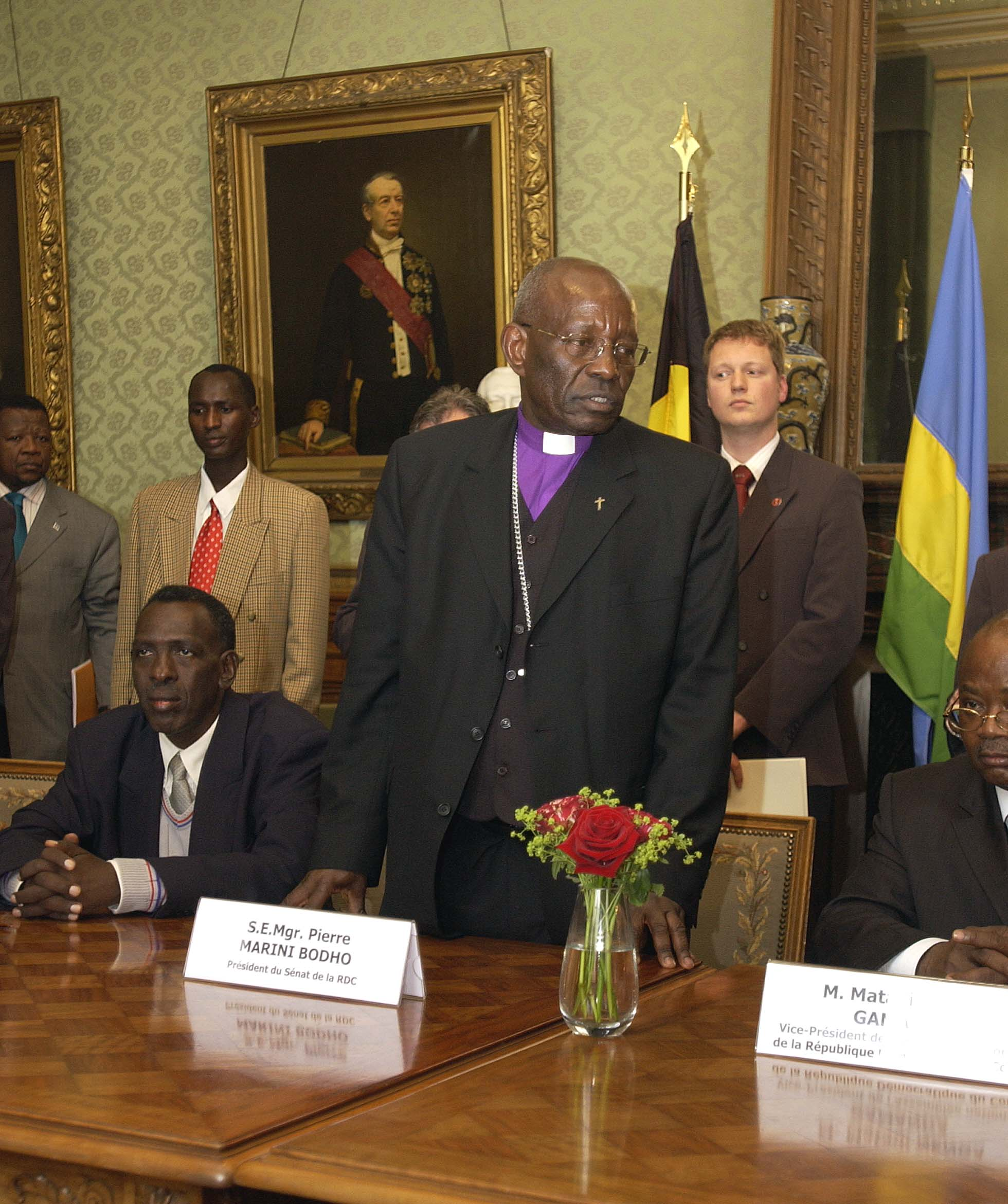

President of the Senate of the Democratic Republic of the Congo
- In office 7 April 2002 – 11 May 2007
- Preceded by: Position established
- Succeeded by: Léon Kengo Wa Dondo

Personal details
- Born: 1938 (age 87–88) Zeu, Ituri

Pierre Marini Bodho (born 30 March 1938, in Zeu, Ituri), was the Presiding Bishop of the Church of Christ in Congo and former President of the Senate of the Democratic Republic of the Congo.

Marini holds a doctorate in theology from the Faculté Libre de Théologie Protestante de Paris, and other degrees in theology, comparative law, and secondary education.

== National role ==
Following the end of the Second Congo War, transitional institutions were established, composed of the former warring parties, as well as representatives of the non-belligerent opposition, and representatives of the civil society. Consequently, from 2003 to 2007, as a reasonably neutral and consensual figure, and as a representative of the organized religion section of the civil society, Marini also served as the President of the Senate, the upper house of the Congolese Parliament.

In 2006, he blessed the marriage of the then president of the Democratic Republic of the Congo, Joseph Kabila.

Preceded by Vacant	Presidents of the Senate of the Democratic Republic of the Congo; April, 2003 - 2007	Succeeded by Léon Kengo Wa Dondo
