= Joseph Iléo =

Congolese Prime Minister (1921–1994)

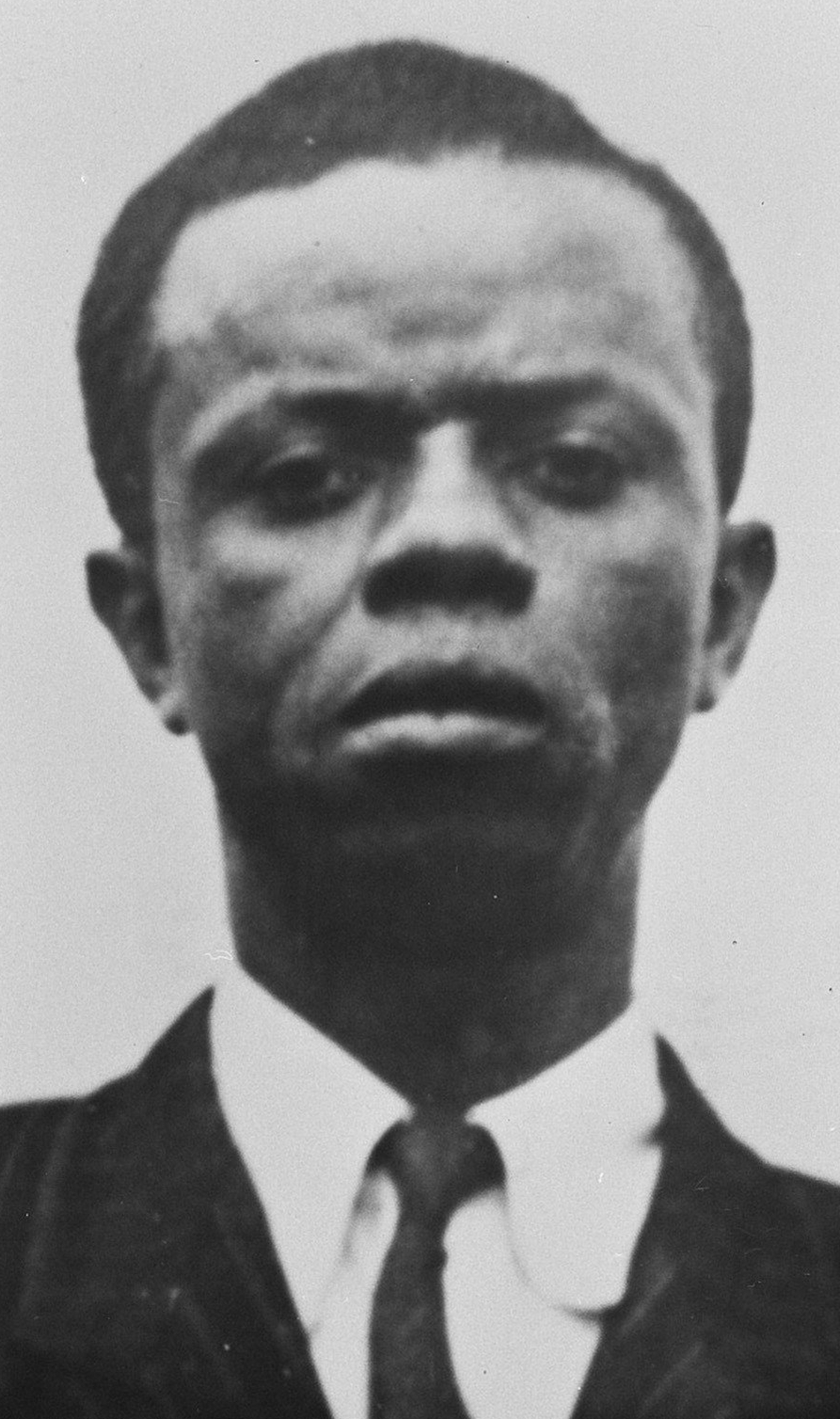
- Iléo in 1960

2nd Prime Minister of the Democratic Republic of the Congo
- In office 5 September 1960 – 20 September 1960
- President: Joseph Kasa-Vubu
- Preceded by: Patrice Lumumba
- Succeeded by: Justin Marie Bomboko (as Chairman of the Board of Commissioners-General)
- In office 9 February 1961 – 2 August 1961
- President: Joseph Kasa-Vubu
- Preceded by: Justin Marie Bomboko (as Chairman of the Board of Commissioners-General)
- Succeeded by: Cyrille Adoula

President of the Senate of the Democratic Republic of the Congo
- In office 22 June 1960 – 5 September 1960
- Deputy: Jacques Masangu (First Vice-President); Joseph Okito (Second Vice-President)
- Succeeded by: Victor Koumorico

Personal details
- Born: 15 September 1921 Léopoldville, Belgian Congo (Now Kinshasa, Democratic Republic of the Congo)
- Died: 19 September 1994 (aged 73) Brussels, Belgium
- Party: Mouvement National Congolais; Parti Démocrate Social Chrétien (1990–1994)

Joseph Iléo (15 September 1921 – 19 September 1994), subsequently Zairianised as Sombo Amba Iléo, was a Congolese politician and was prime minister for two periods.

== Early life ==
Joseph Iléo was born on 15 September 1921. In 1956, he was one of the authors of Manifeste de la Conscience Africaine, which demanded the right of Africans to self-rule.

In 1958, he was one of the founders of the Mouvement National Congolais (MNC). Whereas Patrice Lumumba represented the more revolutionary wing of the MNC, calling for both political and socio-economic independence, Iléo was closer to Congolese comprador elites who sought to eliminate discriminatory obstacles within an otherwise "neocolonial" status quo. When the movement split a year later, he joined the camp led by Albert Kalonji.

== Career ==
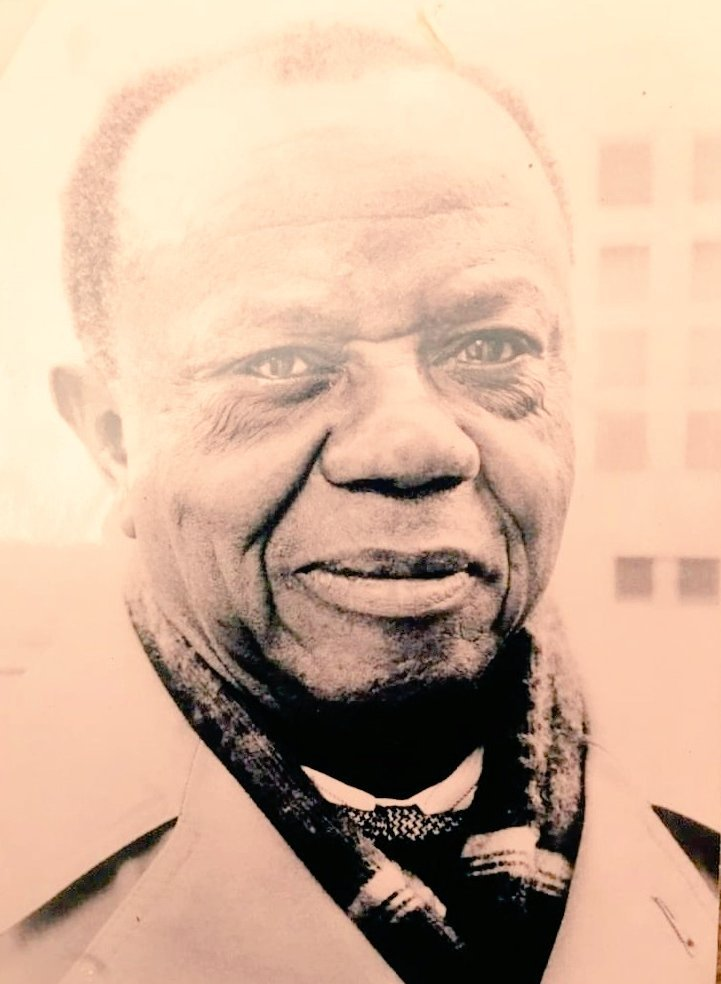
Joseph Iléo at a later age

Iléo was voted into the Senate and then voted its president in June 1960. Upon the dismissal of then-prime minister Lumumba, Iléo was declared prime minister by Congolese president, Joseph Kasa-Vubu, on 5 September 1960. He held the post until 20 September 1960.

Under Kasa-Vubu's successor, Justin Marie Bomboko, Ileo served as Minister of Information. He was again declared prime minister on 9 February 1961. He remained in this post until 2 August 1961.

From March to December 1979 Iléo served as President of the National Assembly.

== Later life ==
In April 1990, he founded the Parti Démocrate Social Chrétien, serving as chairman of the party until his death. He died on 19 September 1994, aged 73.

Political offices
Preceded by Patrice Lumumba	Prime Minister of the Democratic Republic of the Congo; 5 September 1960 – 20 September 1960	Succeeded by Justin Marie Bomboko
Preceded by Justin Marie Bomboko	Prime Minister of the Democratic Republic of the Congo; 9 February 1961 – 2 August 1961	Succeeded by Cyrille Adoula
