= Punia Territory =

Punia Wilaya ya Punia (Swahili)
- Territory
- Interactive map of Punia
- Coordinates: 1.4667°S 26.4500°E
- Country: DR Congo
- Province: Maniema
- Time zone: UTC+2 (CAT)

Punia is a territory in Maniema province of the Democratic Republic of the Congo.
