= Lubutu =

City of the Democratic Republic of the Congo

Coordinates: 0°44′35″S 26°35′00″E

Lubutu is a town in Lubutu Territory, Maniema Province in the Democratic Republic of the Congo. As of 2012, it had an estimated population of 8,205. The town is a hub for collecting minerals mined in the area, but impassable roads are a significant obstacle to moving goods. In 2019 there was a protest of Mai-Mai Simba who stole some gold ore. At one point the town had a hospital run by Doctors without Borders, but by 2015 it had closed.
