= Léon Mamboleo =

Congolese politician

His Excellency Léon Mamboleo

President of the Senate of the Democratic Republic of the Congo
- In office April 6, 2019 – July 26, 2019
- Preceded by: Léon Kengo Wa Dondo
- Succeeded by: Alexis Thambwe Mwamba

Personal details
- Born: 14 December 1936 (age 89) Kagozi, Belgian Congo
- Party: Union for the Congolese Nation
- Education: Kinshasa University (1963, PhD in Law)
- Profession: Lawyer

Léon Mamboleo Mughuba was born in December 1936 in Kagozi in Mwenga. He is a politician from the Democratic Republic of the Congo, former minister in several national governments since 1960. He was the interim president of the senate after his election in 2018, and currently sits as a Senator.

== Early life ==
After primary studies at the Mero school in Kamituga, he completed his secondary studies at the Petit Séminaire de Mungombe, where he obtained his diploma in Greek-Latin humanities in 1953. The same year, he passed his Jury - in Léopoldville - with honour; which opens the doors to Lovanium University.

He was one of the first 5 Doctors of Law in the history of the Democratic Republic of the Congo from 1960 to 1963 (together with Etienne Tshisekedi, Dede Alexis, Dipumba Barthélémy, Kabeya Joseph Alidor and Tshibangu Crispin) and Betty Hubert (from Cameroon) and Gakwaya Faustin (Rwandan). He obtained in 1963, his doctorate in law.

== Professional career and political life ==
His professional career began in 1964 when he was appointed Legal Advisor and Director of the Studies and Documentation Department at the House of Representatives of the Congolese Parliament. The same year, he was part of the Technical Secretariat responsible for drawing up the "Luluabourg Constitution" (the first Constitution after independence). He will then be a lawyer before the Court of Appeal of Léopoldville (since 1965), Lawyer before the Court of First Instance of Bukavu (since 1971), Lawyer before the Court of Appeal of Kisangani, Lawyer before the Court of Appeal from Bukavu and several times Dean of the Council of the Order. Until 1994 (before the RPF took power in Rwanda), he was a lawyer holding a permit from the Government of Rwanda to plead before the courts of that country.

His political engagement dates from 1964. He was then one of the leaders of the "African Democratic Party" (PDA), which led him to be appointed Minister of Justice and Keeper of the Seals and Social Affairs of the government of Public Safety led by Moïse Tshombé from 1964 to 1965. In his capacity as Minister of Justice, he was co-signer, for his promulgation, of the Constitution of Luluabourg. In 1965, he joined a new political party: the Alliance of Congolese Christian Socialists (ASCCO) and managed to be elected national deputy for the electoral district of Kivu. He then joined the Popular Movement of the Revolution (MPR) until he was hoisted there as a member of the Central Committee and the Political Bureau.

During the democratization of 1990, he left the MPR to join the UFERI, then the UDPS (he was a member of the Federation of the UDPS in South Kivu), before leaving politics definitively (after his participation in the National Sovereign Conference) and devote himself to reading, his passion all the time.

Léon Mamboleo is one of the eminent lawyers who have always defended the cause of DR Congo before international legal bodies. In 1999, he was the Principal Legal Correspondent for DR Congo at the Agence intergouvernementale de la Francophonie. Since 2000, he had retired and was living between Bukavu, Kinshasa, Europe and the United States.

Last March, he managed to be elected Senator of the Province of South Kivu and currently chairs, in his capacity as dean of the new elected Senators, he was elected interim president to replace Léon Kengo at the Senate of the Democratic Republic of Congo.

== Private life ==
Léon Mamboleo is married and the father of several children. One of his children, Milulu Mamboleo was a national minister in DRC in Kabila government.
