= Maniema =

Province of the Democratic Republic of the Congo

Maniema Province du Maniema (French) Mkoa wa Maniema (Swahili)
- Province
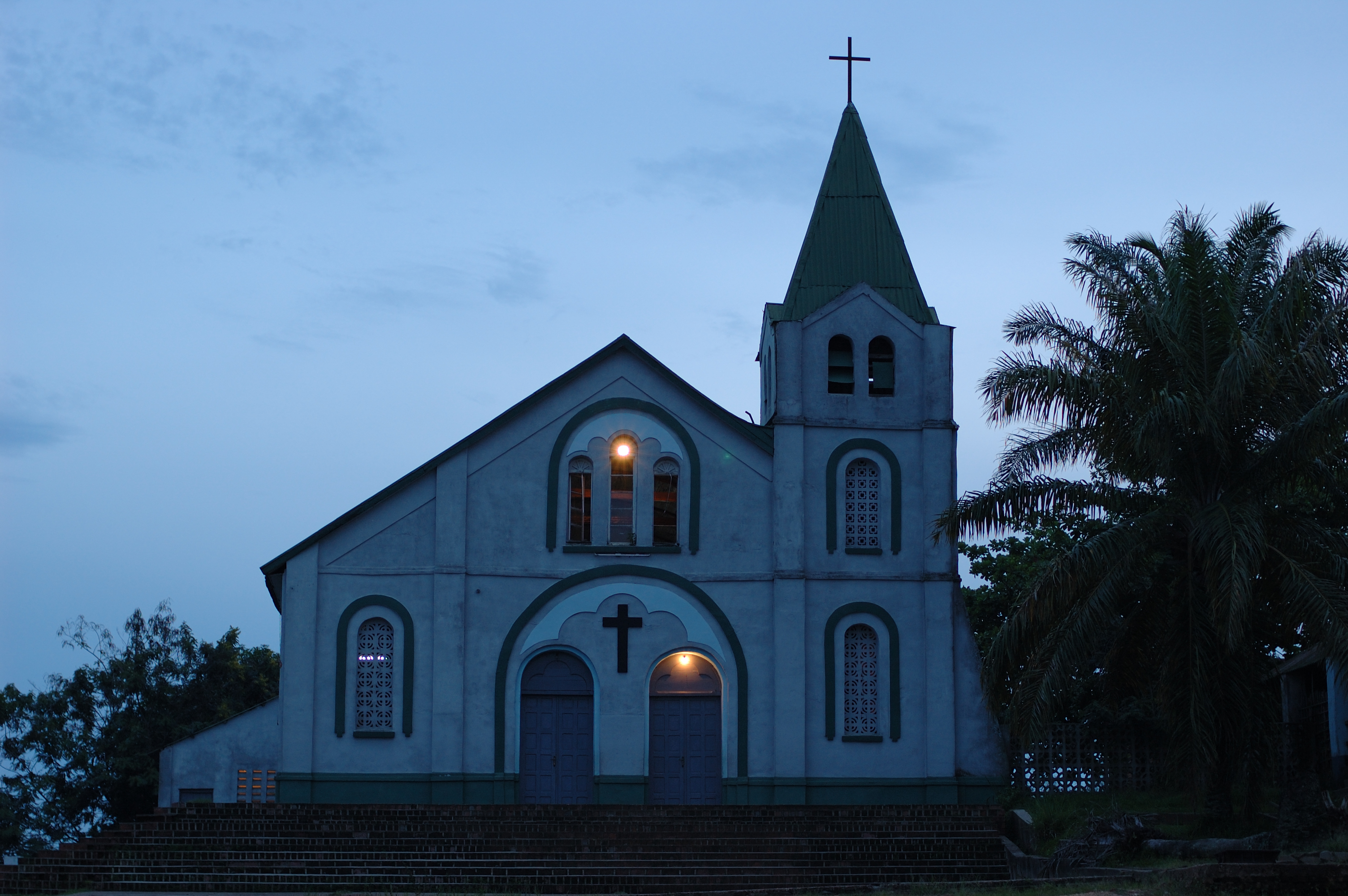
- Church in Kindu

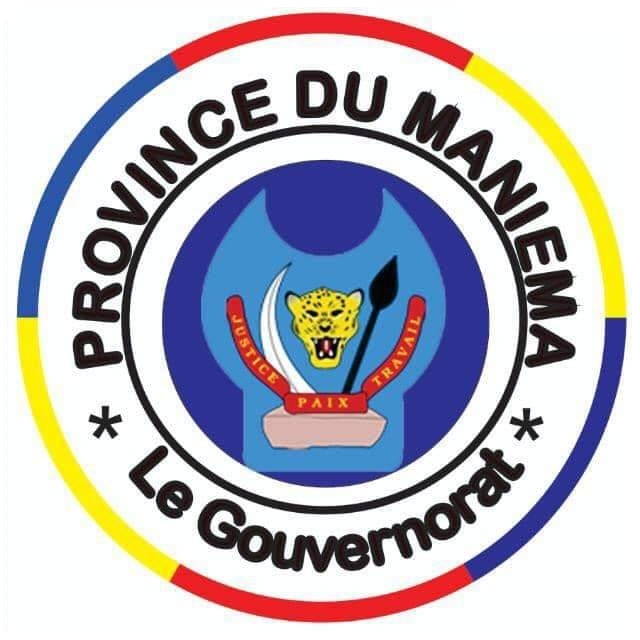
- Seal

- Coordinates: 02°57′S 25°57′E
- Country: Democratic Republic of the Congo
- Capital: Kindu

Government
  - Type: Provincial assembly
  - Body: Provincial Assembly of Maniema
  - Governor: Moïse Mussa

Area
  - Total: 132,520 km^{2} (51,170 sq mi)
  - Rank: 6th

Population (2020 est.)
  - Total: 2,856,300
  - Rank: 18th
  - Density: 21.554/km^{2} (55.824/sq mi)

Ethnic groups
  - Native: Basongye • Anamongo • Batetela • Bakumu • Barega • Bazimba • Basongora • Baluba • Babembe • Baholoholo • Bangubangu • Wagenya • Twa Pygmies • Waungwana
  - Settler: Banyarwanda
- License Plate Code: (Democratic Republic of the Congo) CGO / 17
- Official language: French
- National language: Swahili
- HDI (2017): 0.431 low

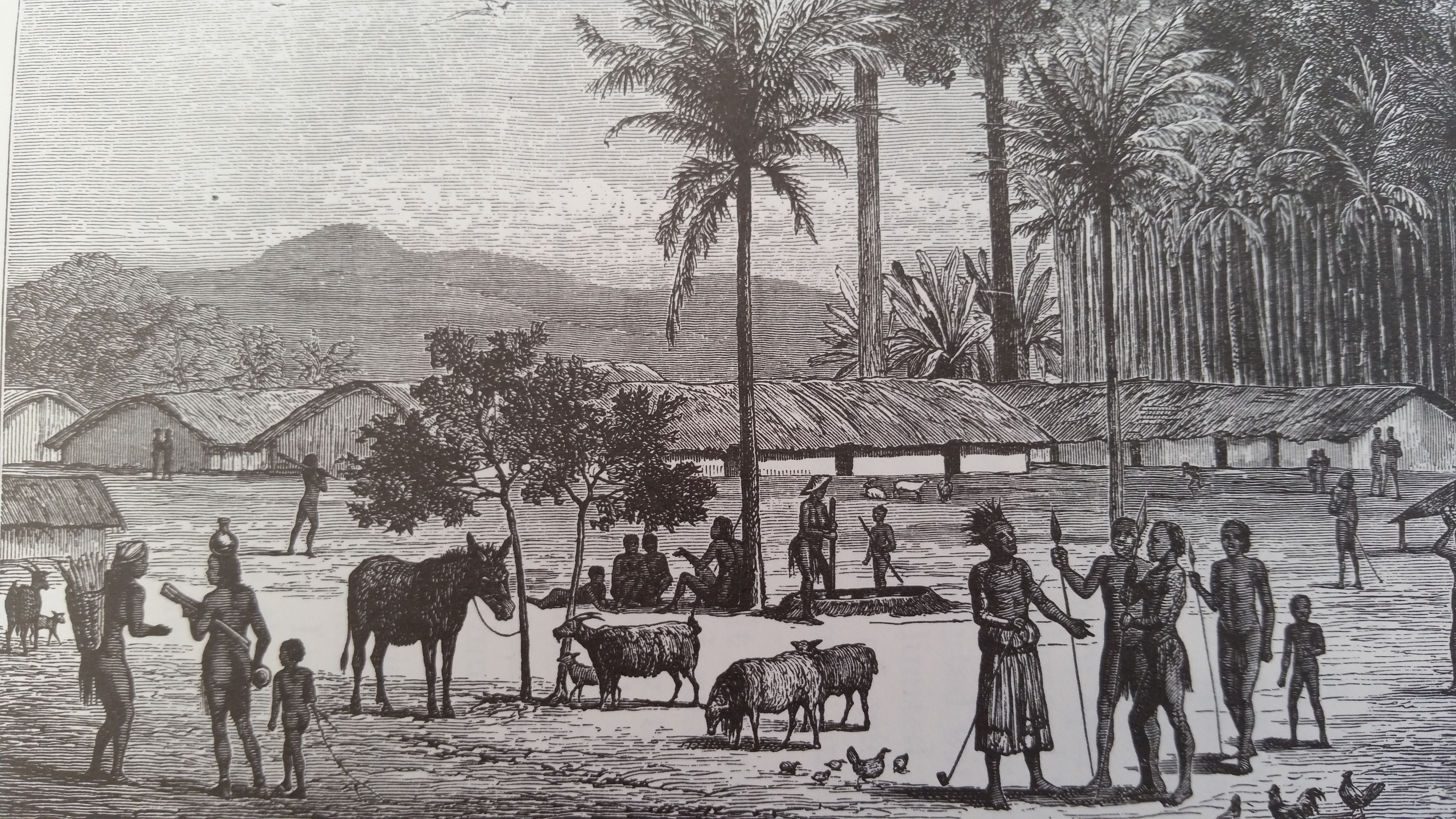
Manyema Village in 1876

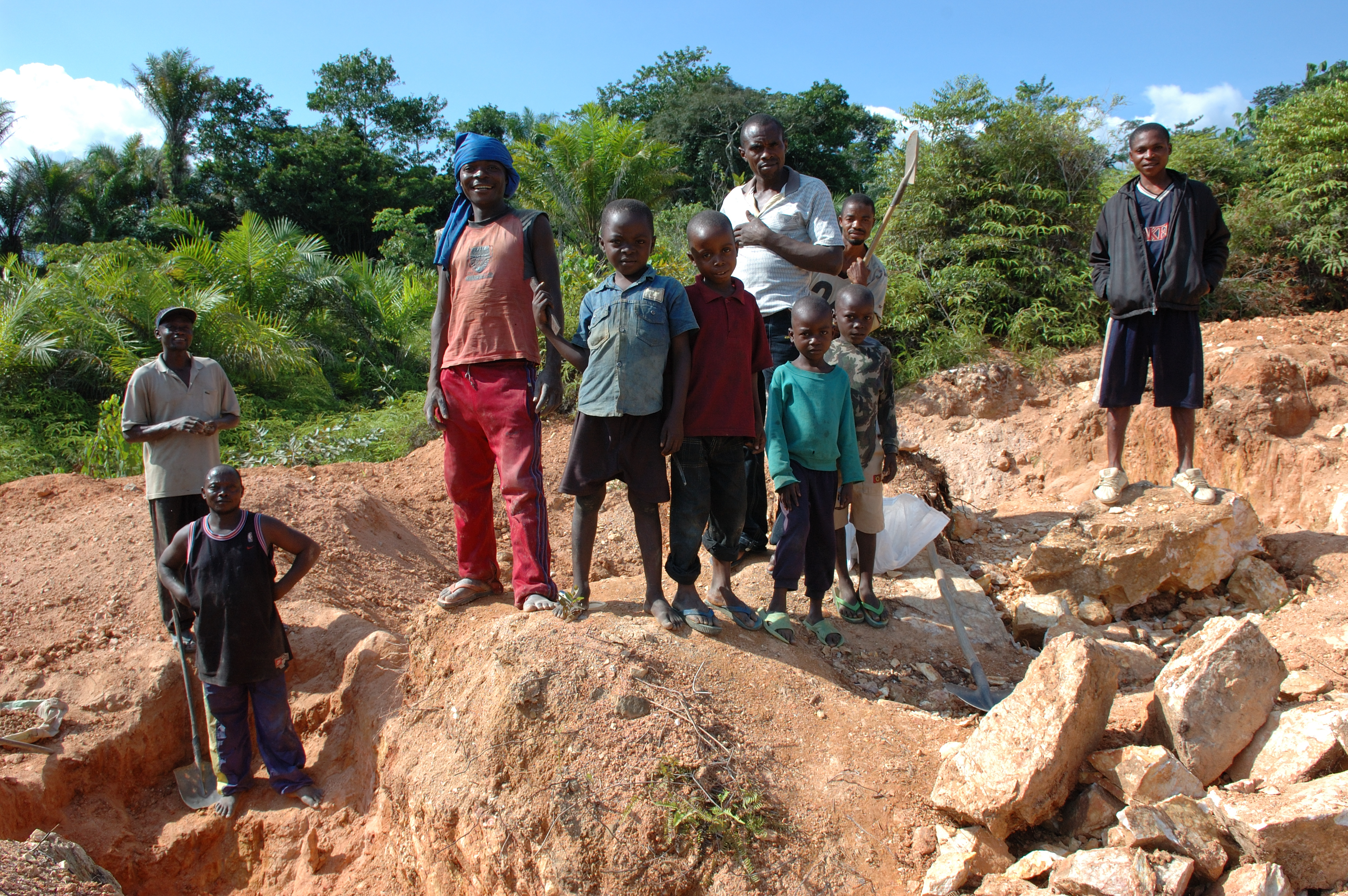
Miners and their children in Kailo Territory, 2007

Maniema Province (Mkoa wa Maniema, in Swahili) is one of 26 provinces of the Democratic Republic of the Congo. Its capital is Kindu. The 2020 population was estimated to be 2,856,300.

== Toponymy ==
Henry Morton Stanley explored the area, calling it Manyema.

== Geography ==
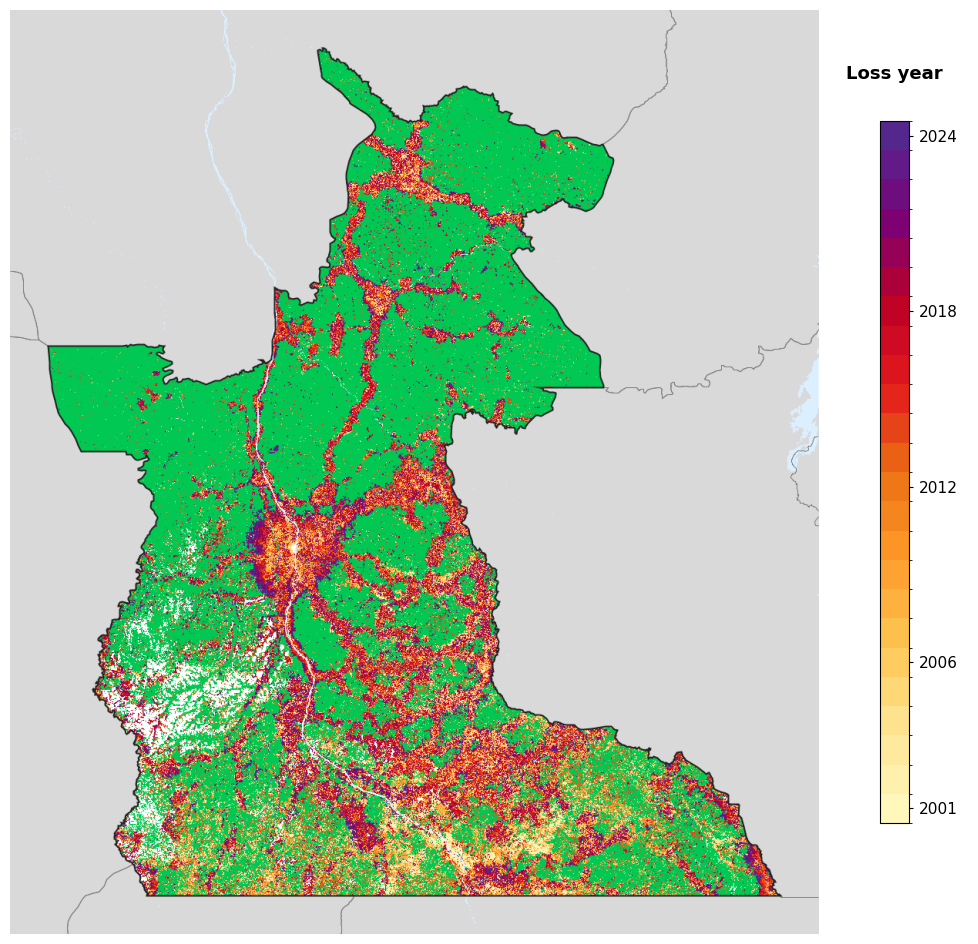
Tree-cover loss year in Maniema, 2001-2024, from the Global Forest Change dataset.

Maniema borders the provinces of Sankuru to the west, Tshopo to the north, North Kivu and South Kivu to the east, and Lomami and Tanganyika to the south.

== Administration ==
Maniema is divided in to seven territories and one independently administered city.

| Administrative division | Type | Map |
|---|---|---|
| Kindu | City | Kindu |
| Kabambare | Territory | Kabambare |
| Kailo | Territory | Kailo |
| Kasongo | Territory | Kasongo |
| Kibombo | Territory | Kibombo |
| Lubutu | Territory | Lubutu |
| Pangi | Territory | Pangi |
| Punia | Territory | Punia |

== Economy ==
Mining is the main industry in the province and diamonds, copper, gold and cobalt are mined outside of Kindu.

Kailo Territory is home to open pit wolframite and Cassiterite mines.

== Education ==
- University of Kindu

== See also ==
- Maniema District
- Tippu Tip
