= National Assembly (Democratic Republic of the Congo) =

Lower house of parliament in Democratic Republic of the Congo

Coordinates: 4.3322°S 15.3031°E

National Assembly Assemblée nationale
- 4th National Assembly

Type
- Type: Lower house None (1967–2003) Lower house (1960–1967)

History
- Founded: 1960

Leadership
- President: Aimé Boji, UNC since 14 November 2025
- 1st Vice President: Jean-Claude Tshilumbayi, UDSP since 24 May 2024
- 2nd Vice President: Christophe Mboso, AACRD since 24 May 2024

Structure
- Seats: 500
- Political groups: UDSP/TSHISEKEDI (Note: Union for Democracy and Social Progress/TSHISEKEDI) (70) AFDC-A (Note: Alliance of Democratic Forces of Congo) (35) A/A-UCN (Note: Allied Actions–Union for the Congolese Nation) (34) Act and Build (26) AAAP (Note: Alliance of actors attached to the people) (22) 2A/TDC (Note: Allied Actions–All for the Development of Congo) (21) Alliance bloc 50 (20) MLC (Note: Movement for the Liberation of the Congo) (19) ENSEMBLE (Note: Together for the Republic) (18) 4AC (Note: Alternative Action of Actors for the Love of Congo) (17) AACPG (Note: Alliance for the Advent of a Prosperous and Greater Congo) (16) Alliance 2024 (15) ANB (Note: It's up to us to build the Congo) (13) AA/C (Note: Congo Allied Action for the Convention) (10) Coalition of Democrats (10) ︙ Parties with <10 seats each (138) (Note: Parties with <10 seats each: Actions of the Allies of the Convention for the Republic and Democracy (9) Alliance of Progressive Congolese and Allies (9) Alliance for Democratic Alternation and Allies (8) Action for National Unity (8) Audible Actions for Good Governance (8) Actions of Convention Allies–Unified Lumumbist Party (9) Alliance for Values (7) Alliance for the Triple and Allies (7) Allied Action for the Rise of the Congo (7) Alliance of Nationalists (7) Alliance for the Solidarity Movement for Change (6) Alliances of Unified and Allied Tshisekedists (6) Avançons-MS (5) Another Vision of Congo and Allies (5) Alliance and Action for the Rule of Law (4) Political and Social Forces Allied to the UDPS (4) Christian Alternative for Congo (4) Alliance 2025 (3) Alternative Vital Kamerhe 2018 (3) New Momentum (3) Dynamique Progressive Revolutionnaire (3) Alliance of Political Parties Allied to the Movement for the Liberation of the Congo (3) UDPS/KIBASSA–A (2) Alliance for the Reform of the Republic (2) Action for the Federative Cause (2) Alliance for the Growth and Democracy of Congo (1) Alliance for Development Actions in Congo (1) Leadership and Governance for Development (1) Action by Allies Acquiring Democracy (1)) Carryover from 3rd legislature (16) (Note: The districts of Kwamouth, Masisi, and Rutshuru territories did not participate in the election due to ongoing armed conflict. On 5 March 2024 the Constitutional Court decided that the members of these districts from the previous legislature could fill their former seats until new elections are held in their districts.)
- Length of term: 5 years

Elections
- Voting system: Coexistence: Open list proportional representation with the largest remainder method in multi-member constituencies and first-past-the-post voting in single-member constituencies
- Last election: 20 December 2023 (general); 15 December 2024 (special)
- Next election: December 2028

Meeting place
- Palais du Peuple; Lingwala/Kinshasa

Website
- Official website

The National Assembly is the lower house and main legislative political body of the Parliament of the Democratic Republic of the Congo. It is one of the two legislative bodies along with the Senate. The National Assembly is composed of deputies (fr. députés) who are elected by the citizens of the DRC.

The deputies are responsible for enacting legislation, representing their constituents' interests, and overseeing the executive branch of government. The National Assembly is responsible for deliberating and passing laws that impact the nation and its citizens. It was established by the 2006 constitution, which provided for a bicameral parliament consisting of the National Assembly and the Senate. It is located at the People's Palace (French: Palais du Peuple) in Kinshasa.

The inaugural session of the 4th National Assembly will take place on 29 January 2024, with 477 provisionally elected deputies attending.

== Electoral system ==
The National Assembly is elected every five years by universal suffrage. For the 2023 general elections, 484 seats within the National Assembly were apportioned among 179 electoral districts based on voter registration numbers. The remaining 16 seats were reserved for the districts of Kwamouth, Masisi and Rutshuru, which did not participate in the election due to armed conflicts within these areas; as a result, these seats will instead be represented by members from the previous National Assembly.

The assembly as a whole will consist of 65 members elected in single member constituencies by first-past-the-post and the remaining 435 members elected in multi-member constituencies by open list.

== Number of deputies for each constituency by province ==
The number of deputies elected from each subdivision in parentheses.

=== Bas-Uele (7) ===
- City of Buta (1)
- Territories of Aketi (1), Ango (1), Bambesa (1), Bondo (1), Buta (1), Poko (1)

=== Équateur (12) ===
- City of Mbandaka (2)
- Territories of Basankusu (2), Bikoro (2), Bolomba (2), Bomongo (1), Ingende (1), Lukolela (1), Makanza (1)

=== Haut-Katanga (31) ===
- Cities of Lubumbashi (14), Likasi (3)
- Territories of Kambove (3), Kasenga (2), Kipushi (3), Mitwaba (1), Pweto (2), Sakania (3)

=== Haut-Lomami (15) ===
- City of Kamina (1)
- Territories of Bukama (4), Kabongo (3), Kamina (1), Kaniama (2), Malemba-Nkulu (4)

=== Haut-Uele (11) ===
- City of Isiro (1)
- Territories of Dungu (1), Faradje (2), Niangara (1), Rungu (1), Wamba (3), Watsa (2)

=== Ituri (28) ===
- City of Bunia (2)
- Territories of Aru (6), Djugu (7), Irumu (3), Mahagi (7), Mambasa (3)

=== Kasaï (19) ===
- City of Tshikapa (2)
- Territories of Dekese (1), Ilebo (3), Luebo (2), Mweka (3), Tshikapa (8)

=== Kasaï Central (20) ===
- City of Kananga (4)
- Territories of Demba (3), Dibaya (2), Dimbelenge (3), Kazumba (4), Luiza (4)

=== Kasaï-Oriental (14) ===
- City of Mbuji-Mayi (6)
- Territories of Kabeya-Kamwanga (2), Katanda (1), Lupatapata (1), Miabi (2), Tshilenge (2)

=== Kinshasa (56) ===
- Kinshasa I (Lukunga) (14), Kinshasa II (Funa) (12), Kinshasa III (Mont-Amba) (11), Kinshasa IV (Tshangu) (19)

=== Kongo Central (24) ===
- Cities of Boma (2), Matadi (3)
- Territories of Kasangulu (2), Kimvula (1), Lukula (2), Luozi (1), Madimba (2), Mbanza-Ngungu (4), Moanda (2), Seke-Banza (1), Songololo (2), Tshela (2)

=== Kwango (13) ===
- City of Kenge (1)
- Territories of Feshi (2), Kahemba (1), Kasongo-Lunda (4), Kenge (4), Popokabaka (1)

=== Kwilu (28) ===
- Cities of Bandundu (2), Kikwit (3)
- Territories of Bagata (3), Bulungu (5), Gungu (4), Idiofa (6), Masi-Manimba (5)

=== Lomami (16) ===
- Cities of Kabinda (1), Mwene-Ditu (1)
- Territories of Kabinda (3), Kamiji (1), Lubao (3), Luilu (4), Ngandajika (3)

=== Lualaba (13) ===
- City of Kolwezi (3)
- Territories of Dilolo (2), Kapanga (1), Lubudi (3), Mutshatsha (3), Sandoa (1)

=== Mai-Ndombe (12) ===
- City of Inongo (1)
- Territories of Bolobo (1), Inongo (2), Kiri (1), Kutu (3), Kwamouth (1), Mushie (1), Oshwe (1), Yumbi (1)

=== Maniema (12) ===
- City of Kindu (1)
- Territories of Kabambare (2), Kailo (1), Kasongo (3), Kibombo (1), Lubutu (1), Pangi (2), Punia (1)

=== Mongala (11) ===
- City of Lisala (1)
- Territories of Bongandanga (3), Bumba (4), Lisala (3)

=== Nord-Kivu (47) ===
- Cities of Beni (2), Butembo (4), Goma (4)
- Territories of Beni (8), Lubero (9), Masisi (8), Nyiragongo (2), Rutshuru (7), Walikale (3)

=== Nord-Ubangi (9) ===
- City of Gbadolite (1)
- Territories of Bosobolo (2), Businga (3), Mobayi-Mbongo (1), Yakoma (2)

=== Sankuru (14) ===
- Cities of Lumumbaville (1), Lusambo (1)
- Territories of Katako-Kombe (3), Kole (2), Lodja (4), Lomela (1), Lubefu (1), Lusambo (1)

=== Sud-Kivu (32) ===
- City of Bukavu (5)
- Territories of Fizi (4), Idjwi (2), Kabare (4), Kalehe (4), Mwenga (3), Shabunda (2), Uvira (4), Walungu (4)

=== Sud-Ubangi (16) ===
- Cities of Gemena (1), Zongo (1)
- Territories of Budjala (3), Gemena (5), Kungu (4), Libenge (2)

=== Tanganyika (14) ===
- City of Kalemie (2)
- Territories of Kabalo (1), Kalemie (2), Kongolo (3), Manono (2), Moba (3), Nyunzu (1)

=== Tshopo (17) ===
- City of Kisangani (6)
- Territories of Bafwasende (1), Banalia (1), Basoko (2), Isangi (3), Opala (1), Ubundu (2), Yahuma (1)

=== Tshuapa (9) ===
- City of Boende (1)
- Territories of Befale (1), Boende (1), Bokungu (2), Djolu (1), Ikela (2), Monkoto (1)

== Historical composition ==
=== By Coalition ===
2018 general election–?

Following reshuffling ~2021

2023 general election–15 December 2024 special elections

post-15 December 2024 special elections

=== By Party/political grouping ===
2023 general election–15 December 2024 special elections

post-15 December 2024 special elections

== See also ==
- Transitional National Assembly of the Democratic Republic of the Congo
- List of presidents of the National Assembly of the Democratic Republic of the Congo
- Members of the National Assembly of the Democratic Republic of the Congo (2006–2011)
