= Lubefu =

- Commune
- Location within Democratic Republic of the Congo
- Coordinates: 4.71667°S 24.41667°E
- Country: DR Congo
- Province: Sankuru
- Territory: Lubefu
- Time zone: UTC+2 (Central Africa Time)

Lubefu is a community in Sankuru province of the Democratic Republic of the Congo. It is the administrative center of the Lubefu territory.

Lubefu was established as a government station by the Belgian colonial administration, lying on the Lubefu River about 100 miles (160 km) upstream from Bena Dibele, a town on the Sankuru just below the point where it is joined by the Lubefu.
