= Kabinda District =

Coordinates: 06°08′S 024°29′E

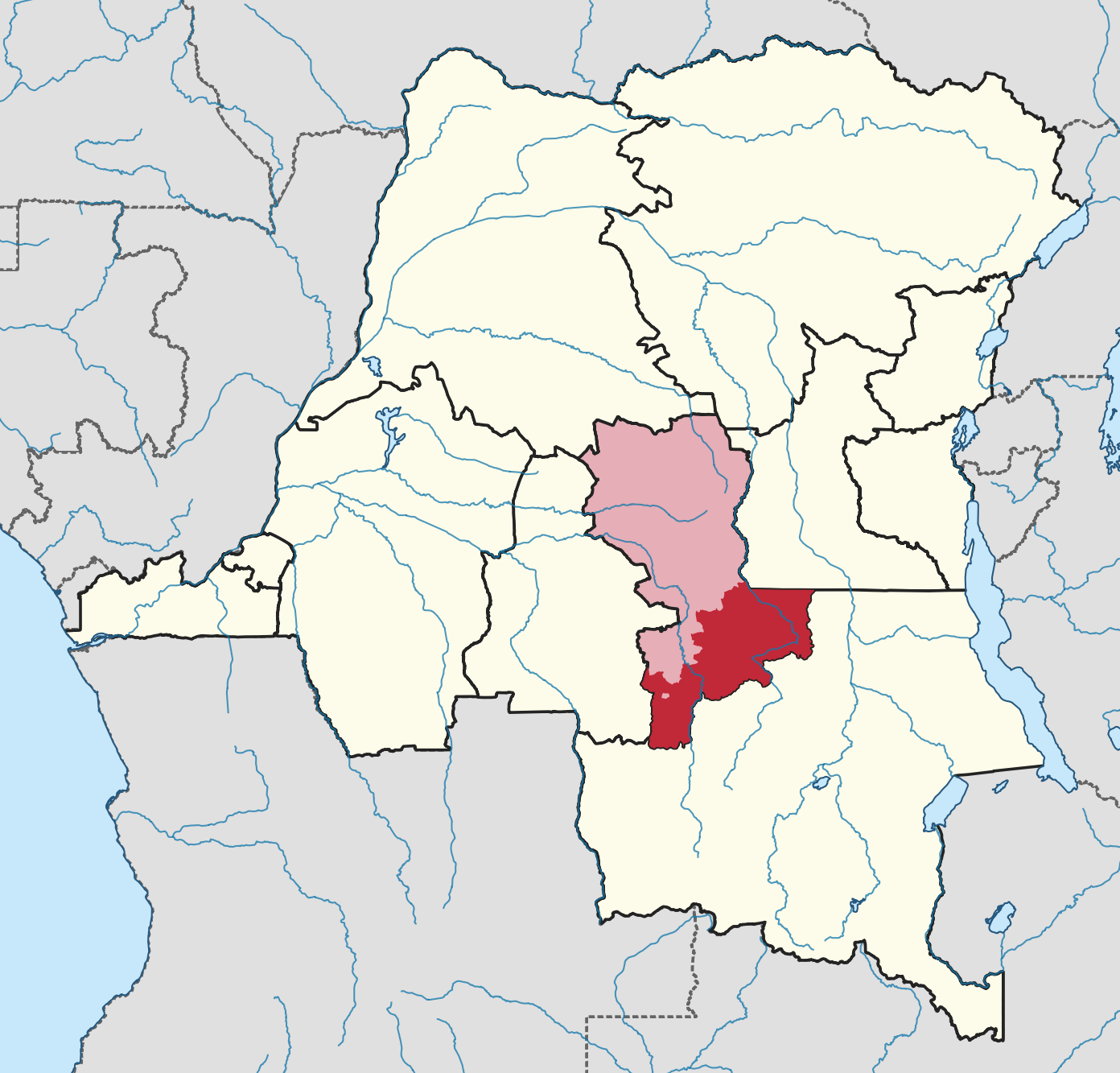
Kabinda district within Kasai-Oriental province (2014)

Kabinda District was a district of the Belgian Congo and the Democratic Republic of the Congo. In 2015 it was merged with the independently administered city of Mwene-Ditu to form Lomami Province.

== Location ==
Kabinda District was crossed by the Lomami River.The capital of the district was Kabinda. There were three major ethnic groups, the Songye, Kanyok and Luba. The district was divided into five territories:

- Gandajika
- Kabinda
- Kamiji
- Lubao
- Luilu

== History ==
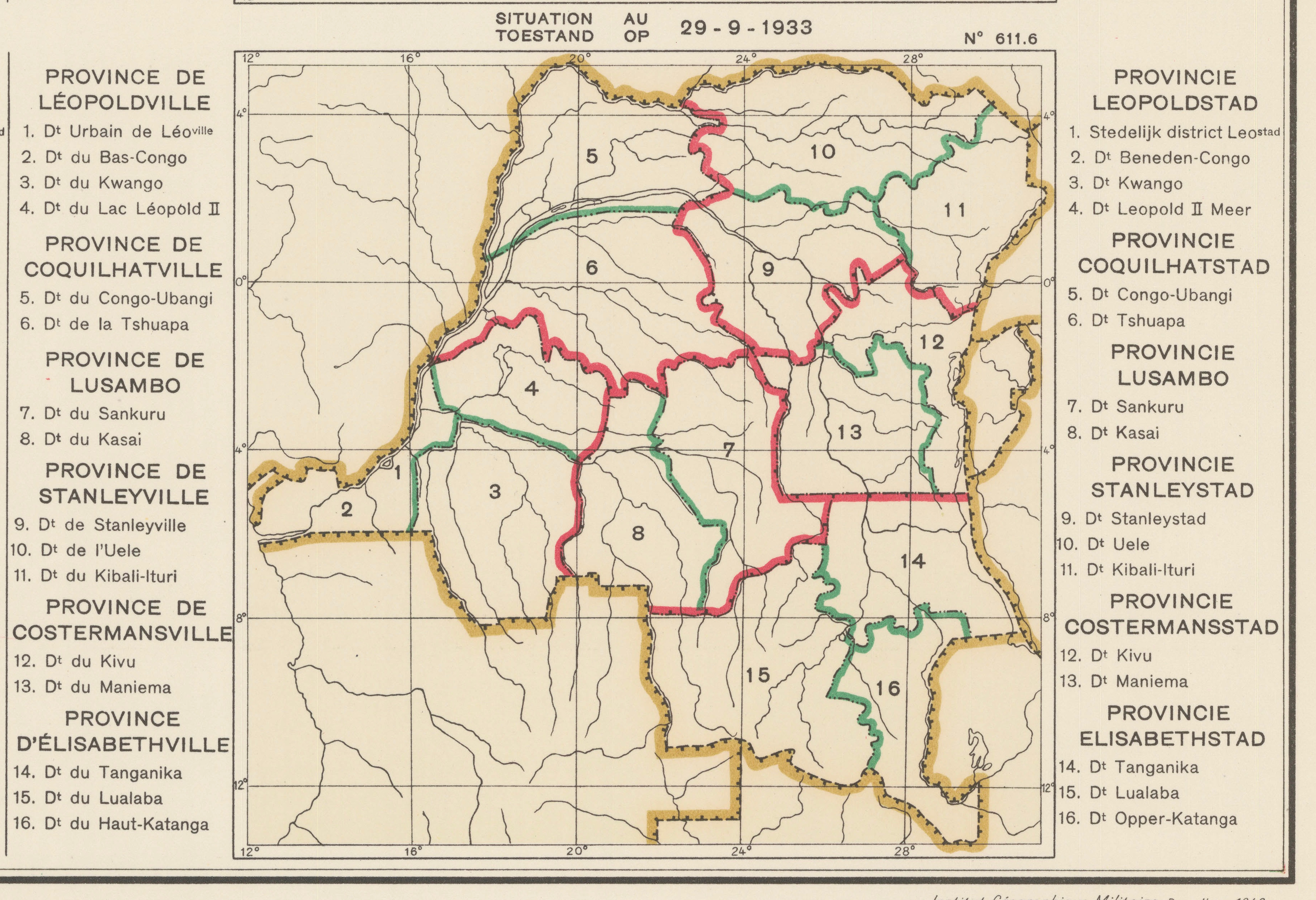
1933 districts before Kabinda had been split out from southeast Sankuru

In 1933 the original four provinces of the Belgian Congo were reorganized into six provinces, named after their capitals, and the central government assumed more control. Congo-Kasaï province was split, with the eastern part renamed Lusambo Province. The number of districts in the colony was reduced to 15. Lusambo Province contained the districts of Sankuru to the east and Kasai to the west. Lusambo Province was renamed Kasai Province in 1947 and some of the districts were divided up.

A 1955–1957 map shows that Sankuru District had been divided into a smaller Sankuru District to the north and a new Kabinda District to the south. Kabinda District bordered Sankuru District to the northeast, Maniema District to the north, Tanganika District to the east, Haut-Lomami District to the south and Lulua District to the west. The area of Kabinda District was 61,800 square kilometres (23,900 sq mi) out of a total of 323,100 square kilometres (124,700 sq mi) for Kasai province as a whole.

The first Lomami Province was created on 14 August 1962 from Kabinda District. Dominique Manono was appointed president on 15 September 1962, and became governor in 1965. He left office in April 1966 and was briefly succeeded by Jean Marie Kikalanga before Lomami became part of the province of Kasaï Oriental on 25 April 1966. In 2015 Kabinda District was merged with the independently administered city of Mwene-Ditu to form Lomami Province.

== Sources ==
- Atlas général du Congo / Algemene atlas van Congo (in French and Dutch), Belgium: Institut Royal Colonial Belge, 1948–1963, OCLC 681334449
- Brass, William (8 December 2015), Demography of Tropical Africa, Princeton University Press, ISBN 978-1-4008-7714-0
- Bruneau, Jean-Claude (30 June 2009), "Les nouvelles provinces de la République Démocratique du Congo : construction territoriale et ethnicités", L'Espace Politique, 7 (2009–1), doi:10.4000/espacepolitique.1296
- "Congo (Kinshasa) Provinces", Rulers.org
- "Constitution de la République démocratique du Congo: Article 2". Wikisource.
- "DRC: Kabinda emerges from siege". UN Office for the Coordination of Humanitarian Affairs. 26 April 2001.
- Lemarchand, René (1964), Political Awakening in the Belgian Congo, University of California Press, GGKEY:TQ2J84FWCXN
- "Provinces of the Democratic Republic of Congo". Statiods.com.
