= Lumumbaville =

- City
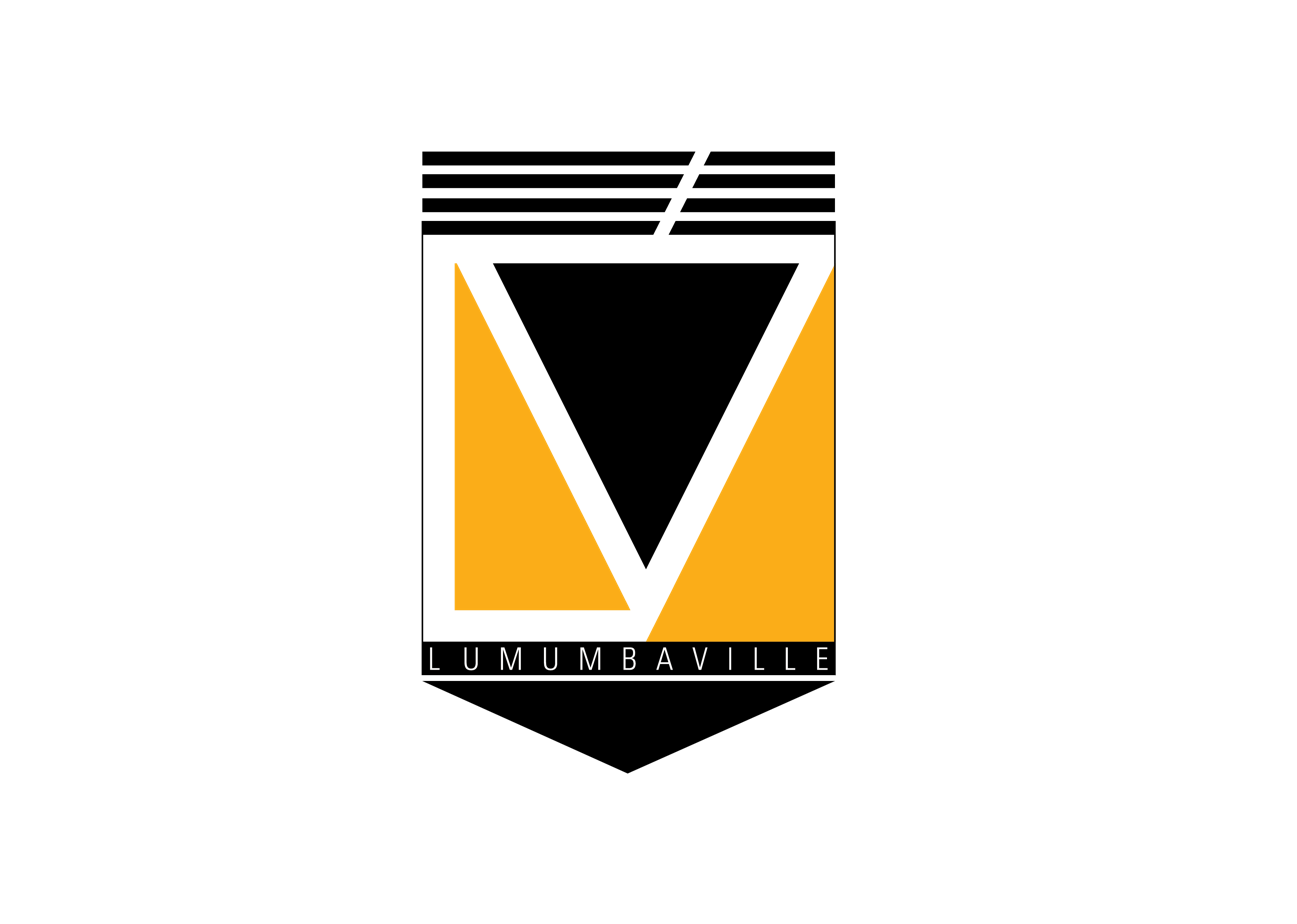
- Seal

- Location in Democratic Republic of the Congo
- Coordinates: 04°04′29.1″S 24°33′05.3″E
- Country: DR Congo
- Province: Sankuru
- City status: 2013 (upheld 2018)
- First Mayor: 6 January 2022
- Named for: Patrice Lumumba
- Communes: Ewango, Wembo-Nyama

Government
  - Mayor: Micheline Ayaki
- Time zone: UTC+2 (Central Africa Time)
- Climate: Aw

Lumumbaville is a new city being developed in Sankuru province, in the central Democratic Republic of Congo. It was created to honor the national and panafrican hero Patrice Lumumba, independence leader and first prime minister of the country, who was executed in 1961 during the Congo Crisis.

As of January 2024, this largely undeveloped planned city, consisting of the town of Wembo-Nyama and the adjoining land and villages of the former Ewango grouping (fr.groupement), enjoys the full administrative and political stature of a city. Lumumba was born in the village of Onalua which is part of Ewango, and completed elementary school in Wembo-Nyama.

== Inception ==
In 2013 President Joseph Kabila's prime minister, Matata Ponyo, signed a series of decrees creating about 78 new cities including Lumumbaville. In 2015 it was found necessary to suspend the setting up of most of these cities, among which was Lumumbaville. It was only in 2018, in the last months of Kabila's presidency, that Prime Minister Bruno Tshibala lifted these suspensions. Lumumbaville was then placed on a priority list for implementation due to its "historical importance".

It was not until June 2020, just a few days before the 60′th anniversary of independence, that a proposal to carry out the making of Lumumbaville into a city was approved at a meeting of the Ilunga cabinet with the strong support of President Félix Tshisekedi. The city administration was installed in time to organize three days of mourning in Lumumbaville when Lumumba's remains were repatriated in June 2022 and brought to Onalua as part of a tour of the country before being laid to rest in a special mausoleum in Kinshasa.

== Location ==
Lumumbaville sits between the territories of Katako-Kombe (Note: The area of land that makes up Lumumbaville was part of Katako-Kombe, but as a city it is now a separate administrative division of Sankuru province and it is technically incorrect to say that it is located in that territory.) and Lubefu stretching from the town of Wembo-Nyama to close by the town of Tshumbe to the northwest. The city was created by carving the Ewengo and Mibangu (Wembo-Nyama) groupings out of Katako-Kombe's Lukumbe sector.

It is located about 158 kilometres (98 mi) northwest of the provincial capital Lusambo, (Note: Distances measured from Onalua using Google Maps in March 2024) 190 kilometres (118 mi) east of the river port town of Bena Dibele, and 122 kilometres (76 mi) southeast of the town of Lodja which has the nearest national airport. No major national or provincial roads reach the city.

== Environment ==
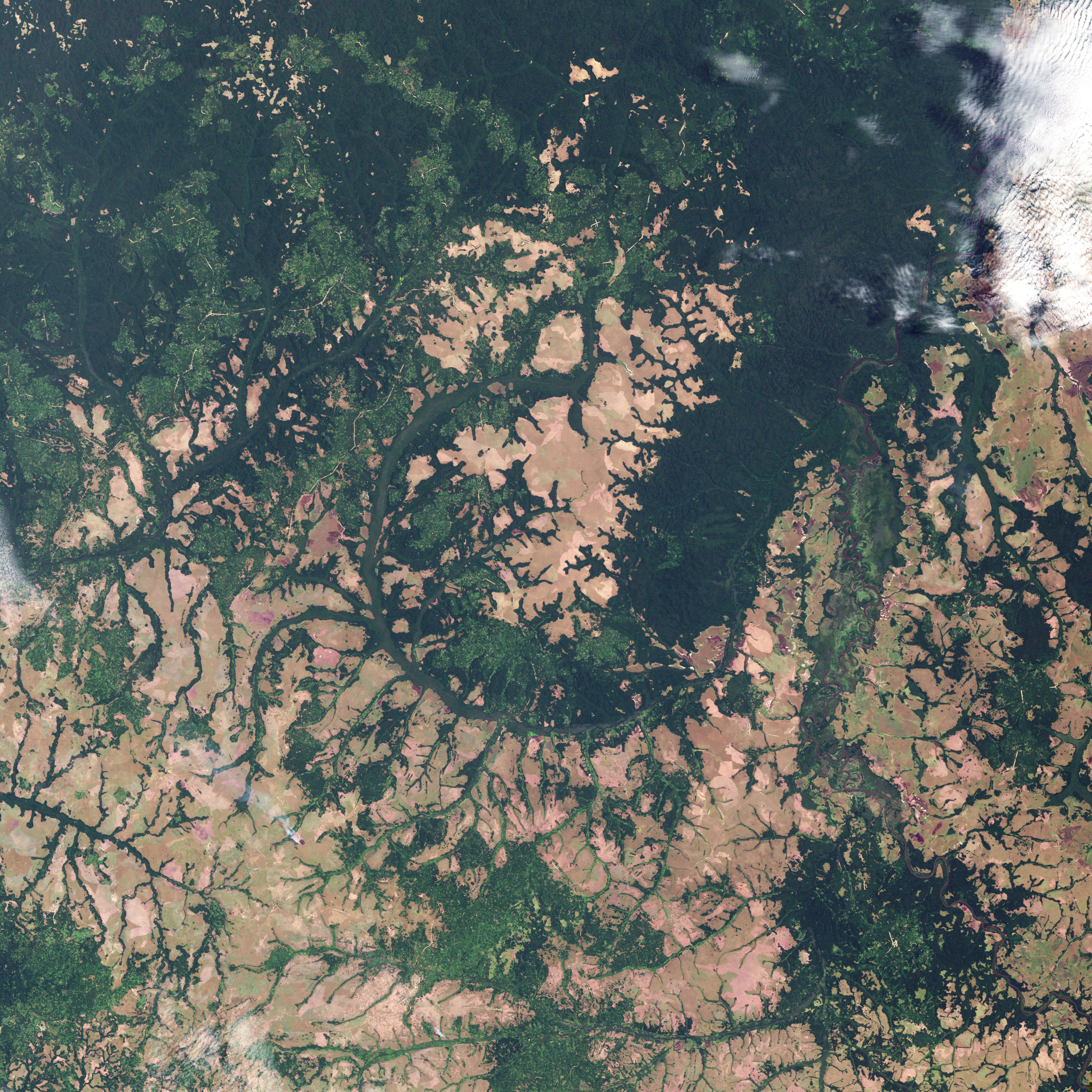
The Wembo-Nyama Feature seen from space, most of the Lumumbaville forest is visible at the bottom center

=== Sacred groves ===
Sacred groves or forests are important preserves of biodiversity in areas undergoing deforestation. In a survey of sacred groves published in 2021 the area which is now Lumumbaville was found to have two groves named Omanguwo and Omakoy in good condition—unimpacted by human activity. Three other groves were found to be somewhat degraded by cultivation and the felling of trees for firewood. Seven other groves were in the category degraded (3) or severely degraded (4) due to more severe exploitation, and the last two had disappeared under dwellings.

In the Congo there is little interest in the management of sacred groves and their conservation rests mostly on traditional custom and fear of the forbidden. In the wider region under study, the survey found that 89% of the sacred groves are under threat. (Note: 65 of 73 existing groves)

== Government ==
In terms of administration, the city is led by a mayor and has two subdivisions: the communes of Ewango and Wembo-Nyama, each of which is led by a burgomaster. On 25 August 2020, President Félix Tshisekedi appointed the first administrative authorities: Micheline Ayaki Anzilani as mayor, her deputy, the two burgomasters, and their deputies. Tshisekedi personally attended their installation ceremony on 6 January 2022.

In the 2023 general election, Lumumbaville elected its first National Assembly deputy and its first deputy to the Provincial Assembly of Sankuru. It was the only new legislative district of the 2024-2028 legislature.

== Infrastructure projects ==
President Tshisekedi is reported to have promised that Lumumbaville will be modern and a tourist city. As of December 2023, development activities include:

- Installation of four solar power plants with the goal of providing electricity to a 1,000 households and 100 street lights.
- Upgrade the access road from Tshumbe and the construction of a modern city hall.
- The State of the African Diaspora signed an agreement to construct a new town, a smart city, on land provided by the city.

The modernizing of the Lodja airport and plans for a practicable road system to connect the major centers of Sankuru to each other and to National Road 1 (RN1) will also benefit Lumumbaville.

== Education ==
Lumumbaville has long reputation of being a cultural and educational city. As of May 2024, education institutions includes:

- UPEL: Université Patrice Emery Lumumba (Patrice Emery Lumumba University)
- ISP: Institut Supérieur Pédagogique de Wembo Nyama.
- ISTEM: Institut Supérieur des Technique Médicales.
- The city serves as an educational pool and has several elementary and high school organized by local churches.

== Notes and references ==
=== Cited works ===
- Shomba Kinyamba, Sylvain (2021). "Lumumbaville, catalyseur de la paix, de la cohésion sociale et du développement durable dans la province du Sankuru" (PDF). Mouvements et Enjeux Sociaux - Revue Internationale des Dynamiques Sociales (M.E.S.-RIDS) (in French). 116 (Janvier–Mars): 1–7.
- Journal officiel de la République Démocratique du Congo (PDF) (in French). Vol. 54 (Special ed.). 20 June 2013. Archived (PDF) from the original on 12 January 2020.
- "Décret n° 13/023 du 13 juin 2013" (PDF). Journal officiel de la République Démocratique du Congo (in French). 54 (spécial). cols 80-84. 20 June 2013. Archived (PDF) from the original on 12 January 2020.
- "Les Décrets portant statut de nouvelles villes, cités et communes mis en veilleuse". le Phare (in French). 23 July 2015. Archived from the original on 1 October 2017.
- Matotu, T. (23 July 2015). "Le Gouvernement relance le débat au Parlement sur la répartition des sièges aux Locales" (pdf). Le Soft International (in French). No. 1325. pp. 6–7. Archived (PDF) from the original on 14 December 2015.
- "Décret n° 18/020 du 30 mai 2018" (PDF). Journal officiel de la République Démocratique du Congo (in French). 59 (13). col 13-14. 1 July 2019.
- "Arrêté Interministeriel n° 25/CAB/VPM/MININTERSEC/HMS/081/2018 & n° CAB/ME/MIN.DRI/ARN/FKT/007/2018 du 30 Mai 2018" (PDF). www.lualaba.gouv.cd (in French). Archived from the original (PDF) on 30 September 2019.
- "RDC: le gouvernement adopte l'opérationnalistation de Lumumba-ville (Wembo-Nyama) en tant que ville". Actualite.cd (in French). 27 June 2020.
- "Sankuru: la dépouille de Patrice Emery Lumumba est arrivée mercredi à Lumumbaville (Onalua)". mediacongo.net (in French). ACP/MCP. 23 June 2022.
- Fonu Anahendo, Josée; Belesi, K; Lubini, A (2021). "Analyse de l'état de conservation des forêts sacrées du Secteur de Lukumbe en République Démocratique du Congo" (PDF). International Journal of Latest Research in Humanities and Social Science (in French). 4 (6): 13–23.
- "Le Président Félix Tshisekedi nomme Ayagi Anzilani maire de la ville de Lumumbaville". Agence Congolaise de Presse (ACP) (in French). 25 August 2020.
- "RDC : Le Président Félix Tshisekedi dote la mairie de Lumumbaville de matériels de travail". Provinces 26 RDC (in French). ACP. 16 February 2022.
- "Liste des meilleurs élus aux législatives nationales de décembre 2023" [List of those elected with absolute majorities in the National Assembly elections of December 2023] (PDF) (in French). CENI. 19 January 2024. p. 7.
- "Voici les députés provinciaux élus: Nord-Kivu, Nord-Ubangi, Sankuru, Sud-Kivu, Sud-Ubangi, Tanganyka, Tshopo et Tshuapa". Forum des As (in French). 24 January 2024.
- Lusimana, Blandine (5 September 2023). "Matérialisation de Lumumba-ville : une délégation d'experts sur le terrain pour des études de faisabilité". Agence d’Information d’Afrique Centrale (in French).
- "Construction of 4 solar power plants in Lumumba Ville". GoShop.cd.
- "Après son érection en ville, WemboNyama, la cité des origines de Patrice Emery Lumumba accède à l'électricité". anser.gouv.cd (in French). 14 December 2023.
- Kabula, Jules (21 December 2023). "Infrastructures de base au Sankuru, lancement des travaux de modernisation de l'aéroport de Lodja et de l'aménagement de Lumumba ville". acgt.cd (in French).
- State of the African Diaspora (23 May 2023). "SOAD signs a cooperation agreement to build Lumumba City in Congo" (Press release).
- State of the African Diaspora (20 January 2024). "From Lumumba Day to Lumumbaville" (Press release).
