= Territories of the Democratic Republic of the Congo =

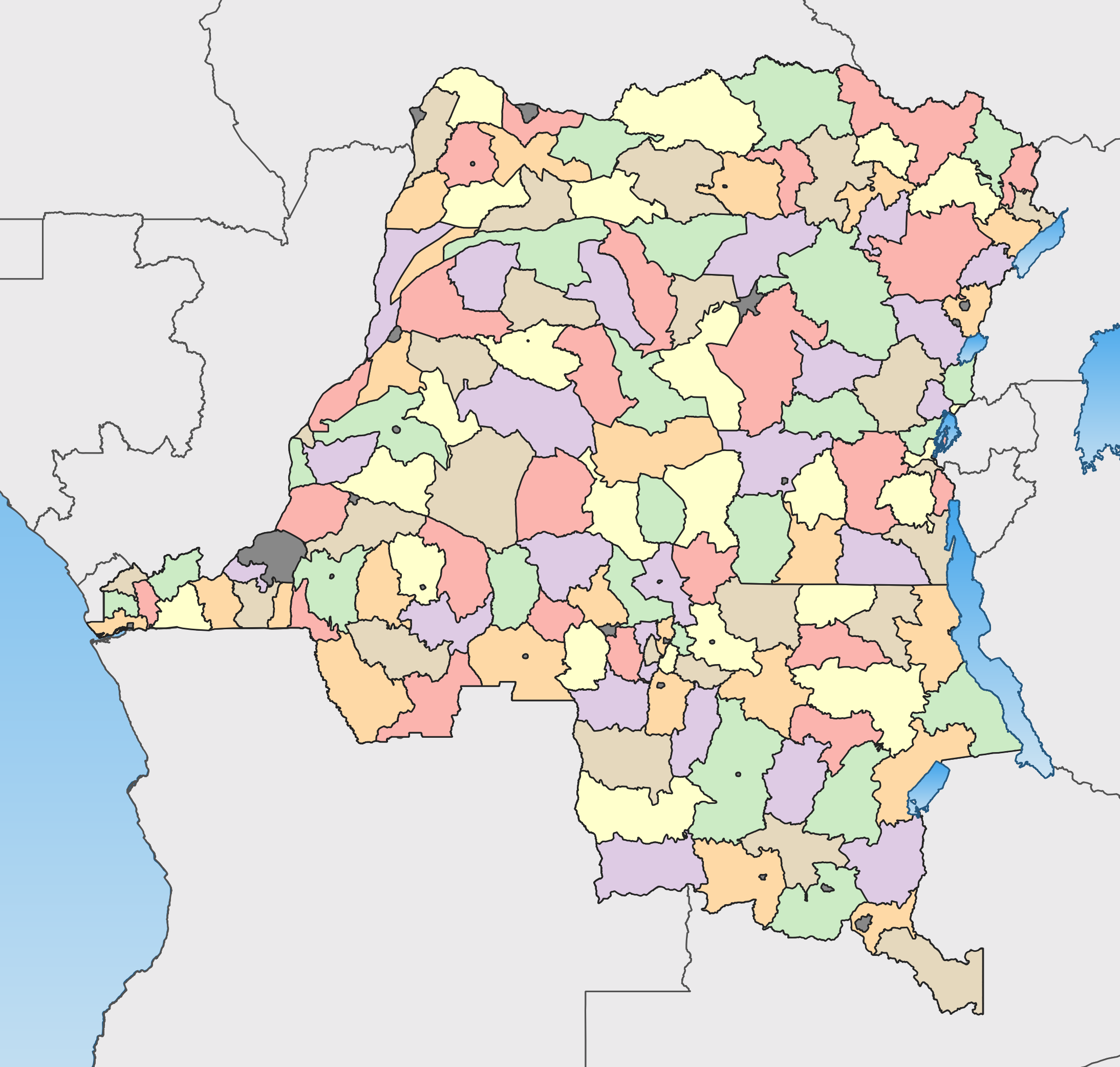
- Territories (pastel colors) and Cities (dark gray)
- Category: 2nd-level administrative division of a unitary state
- Location: DR Congo
- Found in: Province
- Number: 145
- Additional status: National Assembly constituency; Provincial Assembly constituency
- Populations: Largest: Lubero—1,703,102 (2020); Smallest: Kamiji—217,649 (2020)
- Areas: Largest: Bafwasende—47,087 km^{2} (18,180 sq mi); Smallest: Idjwi—310 km^{2} (120 sq mi)
- Government: Appointed administration
- Subdivisions: Sectors, chiefdoms, communes

The territories of the Democratic Republic of the Congo are administrative divisions of provinces. Territories are further divided into sectors, chiefdoms, and communes. They are led by an administrator and, for the most part, take the name of the town that is their administrative center.

== Overview ==
The 25 provinces of DR Congo are divided into 145 territories (fr. territoires, sing. territoire) and 33 cities (fr. villes, sing. ville). Each provincial division is also a constituency of the National Assembly as well as of the Provincial Assembly of its province.

Each territory is led by a territory administrator (fr. administrateur de territoire) assisted by two assistant territory administrators (fr. administrateurs de territoire assistants). They are appointed by the central government and put under the direction of the provincial governor.

The divisions of a territory are: sectors (fr. secteurs, sing. secteur), chiefdoms (fr. chefferies, sing. chefferie) and communes. A territory has at least one commune that is the administrative center and also one or more collectivities (a sector or chiefdom).

Unlike its counterpart, the city, or its divisions, the territory is not a juridical person. However, the actions of its authorities are under administrative control and subject to judicial appeal.

In 2018 73% of the electorate were in territories.

== List ==
The 145 territories are listed below, in alphabetical order, along with the provinces after and before the 2015 reorganization:

Territory	Province	Pre-2015 Province
Aketi	Bas-Uele	Orientale
Ango	Bas-Uele	Orientale
Aru	Ituri	Orientale
Bafwasende	Tshopo	Orientale
Bagata	Kwilu	Bandundu
Bambesa	Bas-Uele	Orientale
Banalia	Tshopo	Orientale
Basankusu	Équateur	Équateur (old)
Basoko	Tshopo	Orientale
Befale	Tshuapa	Équateur (old)
Beni	North Kivu	North Kivu
Bikoro	Équateur	Équateur (old)
Boende	Tshuapa	Équateur (old)
Bokungu	Tshuapa	Équateur (old)
Bolobo	Mai-Ndombe	Bandundu
Bolomba	Équateur	Équateur (old)
Bomongo	Équateur	Équateur (old)
Bondo	Bas-Uele	Orientale
Bongandanga	Mongala	Équateur (old)
Bosobolo	Nord-Ubangi	Équateur (old)
Budjala	Sud-Ubangi	Équateur (old)
Bukama	Haut-Lomami	Katanga
Bulungu	Kwilu	Bandundu
Bumba	Mongala	Équateur (old)
Businga	Nord-Ubangi	Équateur (old)
Buta	Bas-Uele	Orientale
Dekese	Kasaï	Kasaï-Occidental
Demba	Kasaï-Central	Kasaï-Occidental
Dibaya	Kasaï-Central	Kasaï-Occidental
Dilolo	Lualaba	Katanga
Dimbelenge	Kasaï-Central	Kasaï-Occidental
Djolu	Tshuapa	Équateur (old)
Djugu	Ituri	Orientale
Dungu	Haut-Uele	Orientale
Faradje	Haut-Uele	Orientale
Feshi	Kwango	Bandundu
Fizi	South Kivu	South Kivu
Gandajika or Ngandajika	Lomami	Kasaï-Oriental (old)
Gemena	Sud-Ubangi	Équateur (old)
Gungu	Kwilu	Bandundu
Idiofa	Kwilu	Bandundu
Idjwi	South Kivu	South Kivu
Ikela	Tshuapa	Équateur (old)
Ilebo	Kasaï	Kasaï-Occidental
Ingende	Équateur	Équateur (old)
Inongo	Mai-Ndombe	Bandundu
Irumu	Ituri	Orientale
Isangi	Tshopo	Orientale
Kabalo	Tanganyika	Katanga
Kabambare	Maniema	Maniema
Kabare	South Kivu	South Kivu
Kabeya-Kamwanga	Kasaï-Oriental	Kasaï-Oriental (old)
Kabinda	Lomami	Kasaï-Oriental (old)
Kabongo	Haut-Lomami	Katanga
Kahemba	Kwango	Bandundu
Kailo	Maniema	Maniema
Kalehe	South Kivu	South Kivu
Kalemie	Tanganyika	Katanga
Kambove	Haut-Katanga	Katanga
Kamiji	Lomami	Kasaï-Oriental (old)
Kamina	Haut-Lomami	Katanga
Kamonia or Tshikapa	Kasaï	Kasaï-Occidental
Kanyama or Kaniama	Haut-Lomami	Katanga
Kapanga	Lualaba	Katanga
Kasangulu	Kongo Central	Bas-Congo
Kasenga	Haut-Katanga	Katanga
Kasongo	Maniema	Maniema
Kasongo-Lunda	Kwango	Bandundu
Katako-Kombe	Sankuru	Kasaï-Oriental (old)
Katanda	Kasaï-Oriental	Kasaï-Oriental (old)
Kazumba	Kasaï-Central	Kasaï-Occidental
Kenge	Kwango	Bandundu
Kibombo	Maniema	Maniema
Kimvula	Kongo Central	Bas-Congo
Kipushi	Haut-Katanga	Katanga
Kiri	Mai-Ndombe	Bandundu
Kole	Sankuru	Kasaï-Oriental (old)
Kongolo	Tanganyika	Katanga
Kungu	Sud-Ubangi	Équateur (old)
Kutu	Mai-Ndombe	Bandundu
Kwamouth	Mai-Ndombe	Bandundu
Libenge	Sud-Ubangi	Équateur (old)
Lisala	Mongala	Équateur (old)
Lodja	Sankuru	Kasaï-Oriental (old)
Lomela	Sankuru	Kasaï-Oriental (old)
Lubao	Lomami	Kasaï-Oriental (old)
Lubefu	Sankuru	Kasaï-Oriental (old)
Lubero	North Kivu	North Kivu
Lubudi	Lualaba	Katanga
Lubutu	Maniema	Maniema
Luebo	Kasaï	Kasaï-Occidental
Luilu	Lomami	Kasaï-Oriental (old)
Luiza	Kasaï-Central	Kasaï-Occidental
Lukolela	Équateur	Équateur (old)
Lukula	Kongo Central	Bas-Congo
Luozi	Kongo Central	Bas-Congo
Lupatapata or Luhatahata	Kasaï-Oriental	Kasaï-Oriental (old)
Lusambo	Sankuru	Kasaï-Oriental (old)
Madimba	Kongo Central	Bas-Congo
Mahagi	Ituri	Orientale
Makanza or Mankanza	Équateur	Équateur (old)
Malemba-Nkulu	Haut-Lomami	Katanga
Mambasa	Ituri	Orientale
Manono	Tanganyika	Katanga
Masi-Manimba	Kwilu	Bandundu
Masisi	North Kivu	North Kivu
Mbanza-Ngungu	Kongo Central	Bas-Congo
Miabi	Kasaï-Oriental	Kasaï-Oriental (old)
Mitwaba	Haut-Katanga	Katanga
Moanda	Kongo Central	Bas-Congo
Moba	Tanganyika	Katanga
Mobayi-Mbongo	Nord-Ubangi	Équateur (old)
Monkoto	Tshuapa	Équateur (old)
Mushie	Mai-Ndombe	Bandundu
Mutshatsha	Lualaba	Katanga
Mweka	Kasaï	Kasaï-Occidental
Mwenga	South Kivu	South Kivu
Niangara	Haut-Uele	Orientale
Nyiragongo	North Kivu	North Kivu
Nyunzu	Tanganyika	Katanga
Opala	Tshopo	Orientale
Oshwe	Mai-Ndombe	Bandundu
Pangi	Maniema	Maniema
Poko	Bas-Uele	Orientale
Popokabaka	Kwango	Bandundu
Punia	Maniema	Maniema
Pweto	Haut-Katanga	Katanga
Rungu	Haut-Uele	Orientale
Rutshuru	North Kivu	North Kivu
Sakania	Haut-Katanga	Katanga
Sandoa	Lualaba	Katanga
Seke-Banza	Kongo Central	Bas-Congo
Shabunda	South Kivu	South Kivu
Songololo	Kongo Central	Bas-Congo
Tshela	Kongo Central	Bas-Congo
Tshilenge	Kasaï-Oriental	Kasaï-Oriental (old)
Ubundu	Tshopo	Orientale
Uvira	South Kivu	South Kivu
Walikale	North Kivu	North Kivu
Walungu	South Kivu	South Kivu
Wamba	Haut-Uele	Orientale
Watsa	Haut-Uele	Orientale
Yahuma	Tshopo	Orientale
Yakoma	Nord-Ubangi	Équateur (old)
Yumbi	Mai-Ndombe	Bandundu
Main Source: Independent National Electoral Commission

== See also ==
- Subdivisions of the Democratic Republic of the Congo
- Chiefdoms and sectors of the Democratic Republic of the Congo
- Communes of the Democratic Republic of the Congo

== Cited works ==
- "Loi organique n° 10/011 du 18 mai 2010 portant fixation des subdivisions territoriales à l'intérieur des provinces" [Organic Law No. 10/011 of 18 May 2010 determining the territorial subdivisions within the provinces]. LEGANET.CD (in French). Archived from the original on 21 February 2019.
- "Annexe I : De la repartition des sieges pour l'election des deputes nationaux" [Annex I: On the Distribution of Seats for the Election of National Deputies]. Annexes a la loi portant adoption de la repartition des sieges par circonscription electorale pour les elections legislatives (PDF) (in French). CENI. pp. 3–13. Archived from the original (PDF) on 20 September 2018.
- "Annexe II: De la repartition des sieges pour l'election des deputes provinciaux" [Annex II: On the Distribution of Seats for the Election of Provincial Deputies]. Annexes a la loi portant adoption de la repartition des sieges par circonscription electorale pour les elections legislatives (PDF) (in French). CENI. pp. 14–24. Archived from the original (PDF) on 20 September 2018.
- Commission Électorale Nationale Indépendante. "La Cartographie Electorale des 26 Provinces". www.ceni.cd (in French).
