= Musumba =

Musumba Musumbu
- Historical City
- Interactive map of Musumba
- Location in DR Congo
- Coordinates: 8°21′41″S 22°38′32″E
- Country: DR Congo
- Province: Lualaba
- Territory: Kapanga
- Chiefdom: Mwant-Yav

Musumba is a large town in Lualaba Province in the Democratic Republic of Congo. It was the capital of the Kingdom of Lunda. The practices of the Lunda kingdom still persist in Musumba.

As the Lunda Empire expanded in the 1730s and 1740s and into the 1750s large amounts of people from other areas were brought to Musumba.

Musumba was the birthplace of Moïse Tshombe, a Congolese businessman and politician.
