= Gengwa =

Coordinates: 3.100°S 22.854°E

Gengwa is a village in Kole Territory in the Sankuru province of the Democratic Republic of the Congo.
