= Kamiji =

Coordinates: 06°39′00″S 23°17′00″E

Kamiji is a town in Lomami province, Democratic Republic of the Congo. It is the administrative center of the territory of the same name. The town lies west of the Bushimaie River and east of the Lubi River, at an altitude of 2,565 ft (781 m).
