= Beni-Dibele Airport =

- IATA: none; ICAO: FZVO

Summary
- Airport type: Public
- Serves: Bena Dibele, Democratic Republic of the Congo
- Elevation AMSL: 1,739 ft / 530 m
- Coordinates: 4°04′20″S 22°50′25″E

Map
- Location of airport in Democratic Republic of the Congo

Runways
Direction	Length		Surface
Direction	m	ft	Surface
14/32	1,055	3,461	Gravel
- Source: GCM Google Maps

Beni-Dibele Airport (ICAO: FZVO) is an airport serving Bena Dibele, a town on the Sankuru River in Sankuru Province, Democratic Republic of the Congo.

== See also ==
- Transport in the Democratic Republic of the Congo
- List of airports in the Democratic Republic of the Congo
