= Arome Bigabwa =

Congolese politician

Member of the National Assembly

Personal details
- Born: 30 March 1952 (age 74)

Arome Bigabwa (born 30 March 1952) is a Congolese politician and Member of the National Assembly of the Democratic Republic of the Congo.
