= Vehicle registration plates of the Democratic Republic of the Congo =

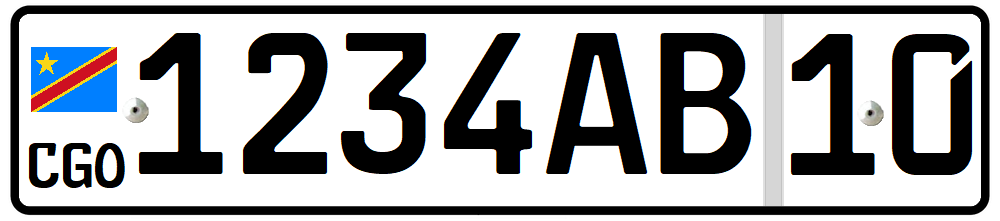

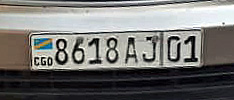

Issue of the current design of registration plate in the DRC began in April 2009. The plates are based on the layout of registration plates in the European Union, but are of a slightly different size (480 × 112 mm) from the standard European size (520 × 110 mm). On the left-hand side is the national flag of the DRC, under which are the letters "CGO". This is followed by a four-digit number and two letters. In addition, located on the windshield of the vehicle is a so-called third mark in the form of an 84 × 53 mm sticker. It repeats the number and letters on the plate and it also includes the chassis number of the vehicle.

The DRC plates are produced by Utsch. The plates have various security features to make counterfeiting difficult. For example, the background of all letters has a hologrammatic foil. Similar measures are also found in the registration plates produced by Utsch for Egypt and Kyrgyzstan.

== Special plates ==
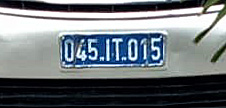
International organisation plate.

- Diplomatic plate: red on yellow, 3 digits corresponding to a country code, the CD symbol, 2 or 3 digits
- Consular corps plate: red on yellow, 3 digits corresponding to a country code, the CC logo, 2 or 3 digits
- Plate of the FARDC: white on black, FARDC followed by 7 digits
- Plate from the United Nations, MONUC: black and white, the symbol A, 3 or 4 digits
- EUSEC plate: yellow to dark blue, EUSEC abbreviation followed by 3 figures
- EUPOL plate: yellow to dark blue, EUPOL abbreviation followed by 3 figures
- Registration plate for international organisations: white on dark blue, 3 figures identifying the organisation, the IT acronym, 3 figures
- Governmental plates:
  - Presidential: black and white, the initials PR followed by 3 or 4 digits
  - National Assembly: black and white, the acronym AA followed by 3 figures
  - Senate: black and white, the symbol ASEN followed by 3 figures
  - Justice: black and white, the abbreviation ADJ followed by 3 figures
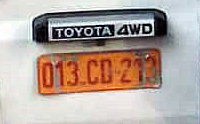
Diplomatic plate

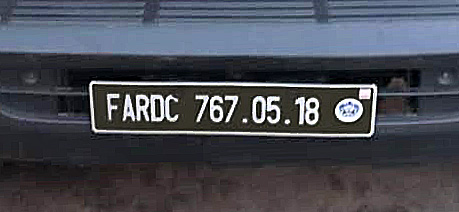
Plate of the FARDC

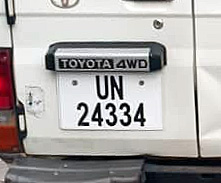
United Nations.

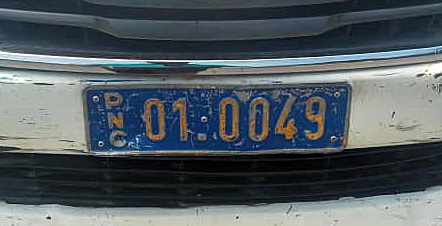
National Police

== Previous plates ==
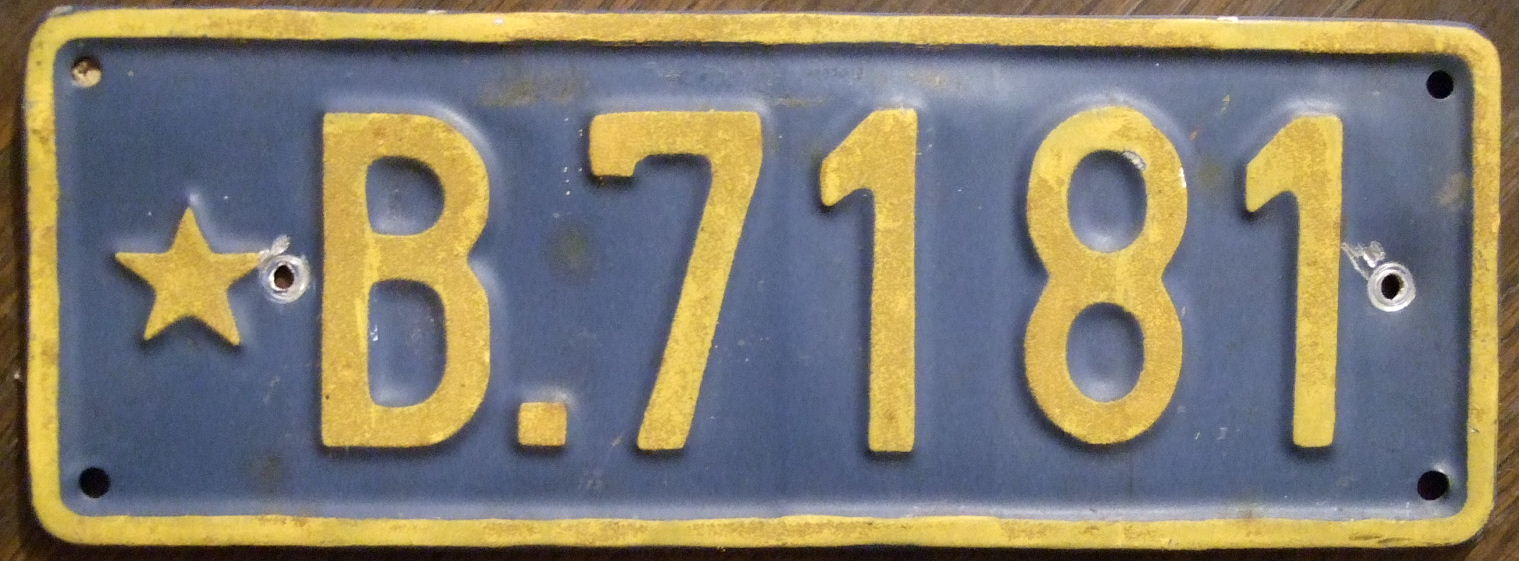
Registration plate from 1958 until 1979

Older style registration plates have different letters and background colors depending upon the era when the plate was issued. Each plate carried the initials of the province where the car was registered, but sometimes the abbreviation of another province would be issued.

- Yellow numbers on Blue background (1958 - 1960), Belgian Congo
- Yellow numbers on Blue background (1960 - 1979), DRC/Zaire, but no change from Belgian Congo style
- Yellow numbers on Green background (1979 - 1997), Zaire
- Black numbers on yellow background (1997)
- Yellow numbers on blue background (1980 - 2009)

The style of the Belgian Congo plates, yellow numbers on a blue background, was continued by the DRC/Zaire until 1979. Plates started with a yellow star, followed by one or two letters with a maximum of four digits after the letter.

In 1979 the plate colors were changed to yellow numbers on a green background. At the beginning were now two provincial letters followed by four digits and a further letter.

In 1997 the plates were redesigned to show a two letter province code, followed by four numbers, and a two letter suffix. These plates had black numbers on a yellow background (430 × 105 mm).

With the change of the country's name back to the DRC in 1997, registration plates returned to the traditional colors of yellow numbers on a blue background. The first two letters of the plate indicated the Province followed by a star, then four digits, and finally two letters. These plates were used until the introduction of the current system in 2009.

== Province codes ==
=== Current Codes ===
Province	Code	Previous province
Kinshasa	01	Kinshasa
Bas-Uele	02	Orientale
Équateur	03	Équateur
Haut-Lomami	04	Katanga
Haut-Katanga	05	Katanga
Haut-Uele	06	Orientale
Ituri	07	Orientale
Kasaï	08	Kasaï-Occidental
Kasaï-Oriental	09	Kasaï-Oriental
Kongo Central	10	Bas-Congo
Kwango	11	Bandundu
Kwilu	12	Bandundu
Lomami	13	Kasaï-Oriental
Lualaba	14	Katanga
Kasaï-Central	15	Kasaï-Occidental
Mai-Ndombe	16	Bandundu
Maniema	17	Maniema
Mongala	18	Équateur
Nord-Kivu	19	Nord-Kivu
Nord-Ubangi	20	Équateur
Sankuru	21	Kasaï-Oriental
Sud-Kivu	22	Sud-Kivu
Sud-Ubangi	23	Équateur
Tanganyika	24	Katanga
Tshopo	25	Orientale
Tshuapa	26	Équateur

=== Previous Codes ===
Province	Code	Code (1996)	Code (1980)
Bandundu	BN	BN	BN
Bas-Congo	BC	BZ	BZ
Equator	EQ	EQ	EQ
Kasai Occidental	KW	KW	KW
Kasai Oriental	KE	KE	KE
Katanga	KT	SH	SH
Kinshasa	KN	KN	KN
Maniema	MN	MN	
North Kivu	NK	NK	
Orientale	OR	HZ	HZ
South Kivu	SK	SK	
Kivu			KV
