= Bena Dibele =

- Location within Democratic Republic of the Congo
- Coordinates: 4.102031°S 22.830276°E
- Country: DR Congo
- Province: Sankuru
- Territory: Kole
- Time zone: UTC+2 (Central Africa Time)

Bena Dibele (also Beni Dibele or Bene Dibele) is a community in Sankuru province of the Democratic Republic of the Congo. Bena Dibele is on the right bank of the Sankuru River just below the point where it is joined by the Lubefu River.

In the early 20th century Bena Dibele was a military station under the command of a sous-officier of a Belgian cavalry regiment, assisted by a young civilian. There were about forty native soldiers stationed at the post, which served as a collection point for rubber brought in by the local people in payment of taxes. Supplies for posts such as Kole and Lodja on the Lukenye River to the north were landed at Bene Dibele and carried overland, a more reliable route than the fast and narrow Lukenye. There were very extensive government rubber plantations under the control of a white official about 3 miles (4.8 km) upstream from Dibele.

Bena Dibele has always depended on the river for communication. During the Second Congo War (1998-2003) the town was cut off as all river traffic was halted from December 1998, and the local economy was crippled since farmers could not sell their produce. Finally in March 2002 a barge with 760 tonnes of supplies managed to reach the town. The shipment included iodised salt, clothing, fuel, soap, school supplies, medicine and other goods. It was coordinated by Caritas Congo, required permission from both the government and the Rwanda-backed RCD Goma armed opposition, and took almost three weeks to travel the 1,300 kilometres (810 mi) from Kinshasa under United Nations escort.

The community is served by Beni-Dibele Airport.

A February 2008 study of 918 children at Bena Dibele aged between 6 and 59 months found that 4.9% were suffering from Global Acute Malnutrition and 1.5% from Severe Acute Malnutrition.
