= Kwamouth =

- Commune
- Location in the Democratic Republic of the Congo
- Coordinates: 3.178224°S 16.205521°E
- Country: DR Congo
- Province: Mai-Ndombe
- Territory: Kwamouth
- Time zone: UTC+1 (WAT)
- National language: Lingala

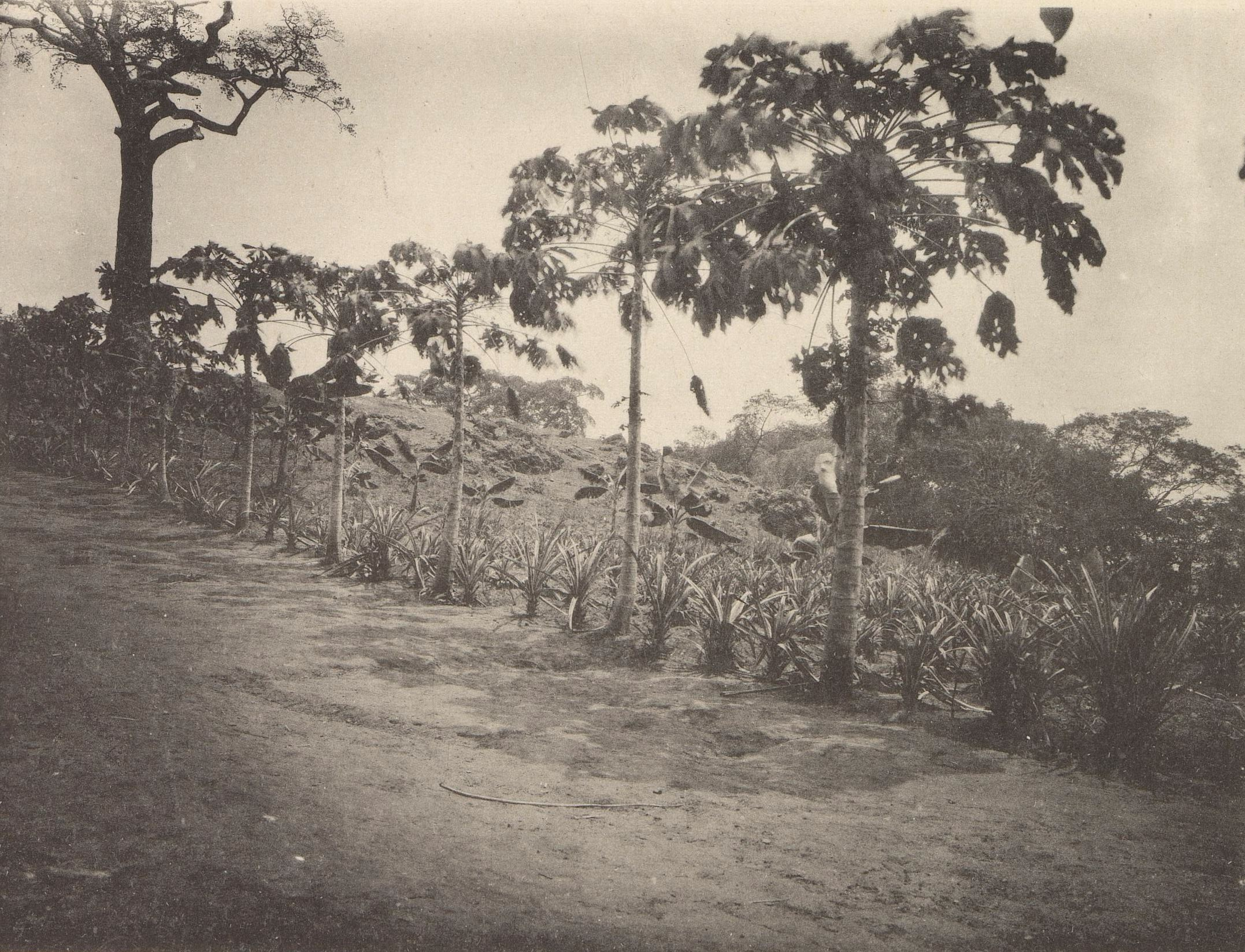

Kwamouth is a small community in Mai-Ndombe province in the Democratic Republic of the Congo. It is the headquarters of the Kwamouth territory. The town lies at the mouth of the Kwah River, the last stretch of the Kasai River after it has been joined by the Fimi River, where it enters the Congo River.

On 2 February 1961 a military Fairchild C-119G Flying Boxcar operated by the Italian Air Force was damaged beyond repair at Kwamouth. There were no fatalities.
