= Kamina Territory =

Kamina Wilaya ya Kamina (Swahili)
- Territory
- Interactive map of Kamina
- Coordinates: 8.8903751°S 25.4525854°E
- Country: DR Congo
- Province: Haut-Lomami
- HQ: Kibula

Area
  - Total: 40,214 km^{2} (15,527 sq mi)

Population (2020)
  - Total: 720,224
  - Density: 17.910/km^{2} (46.386/sq mi)
- Time zone: UTC+2 (CAT)

Kamina is a territory in the Haut-Lomami province of the Democratic Republic of the Congo. After the town of Kamina became a separately administered city, it was decided to move the territory's administrative center from there to the smaller town of Kibula.
