= Kapanga Territory =

Territory within the DRC

Kapanga Wilaya ya Kapanga (Swahili)
- Territory
- Interactive map of Kapanga
- Location within Democratic Republic of the Congo
- Coordinates: 8.5°S 22.65°E
- Country: DR Congo
- Province: Lualaba

Area
  - Total: 24,700 km^{2} (9,500 sq mi)

Population
  - Total: 120,000
  - Density: 4.9/km^{2} (13/sq mi)
- Time zone: UTC+2 (CAT)

Kapanga is a territory in the Lualaba Province of the Democratic Republic of the Congo.

The province is largely rural, dominated by woodland savanna. There is one major cluster of cities near the center of the territory, comprising Musumba, Kapanga, and Ntita. The region is difficult to access, with poor-quality roads and no nearby railroads. Soil fertility is a problem in Kapanga, with the more fertile regions covered by woodlands. As a result, deforestation has become a significant problem, as farmers seek fertile soil for commercial crops.
