= Lodja Territory =

Lodja
- Territory
- Interactive map of Lodja
- Country: DR Congo
- Province: Sankuru

Area
  - Total: 12,054 km^{2} (4,654 sq mi)

Population
  - Total: 927,910
  - Density: 76.979/km^{2} (199.38/sq mi)
- Time zone: UTC+2 (CAT)

Lodja is a territory in Sankuru province of the Democratic Republic of the Congo.
