= Kasaï-Oriental (former province) =

Kasaï-Oriental Province Province du Kasaï-oriental
- Former province of the Democratic Republic of the Congo
- Country: Democratic Republic of the Congo
- Established: 1966
- Dissolved: 2015
- Capital: Mbuji-Mayi
- Largest city: Mbuji-Mayi

Government
  - Governor: Alphonse Ngoyi Kasanji

Area
  - Total: 173,110 km^{2} (66,840 sq mi)

Population (2010 est.)
  - Total: 6,556,917
  - Density: 37.877/km^{2} (98.101/sq mi)
- Official language: French
- National language: Tshiluba
- Website: kasaiest.cd

Kasaï-Oriental (French for "East Kasai") was one of the eleven provinces of the Democratic Republic of the Congo between 1966 and 2015, when it was split into the new, smaller Kasai-Oriental province, the Lomami and the Sankuru provinces.

It borders the provinces of Kasaï-Occidental to the west, Équateur to the northwest, Orientale to the northeast, Maniema to the east, and Katanga to the south. Kasaï-Oriental is one of the richest diamond producing regions in the world. The provincial capital is Mbuji-Mayi.

== History ==
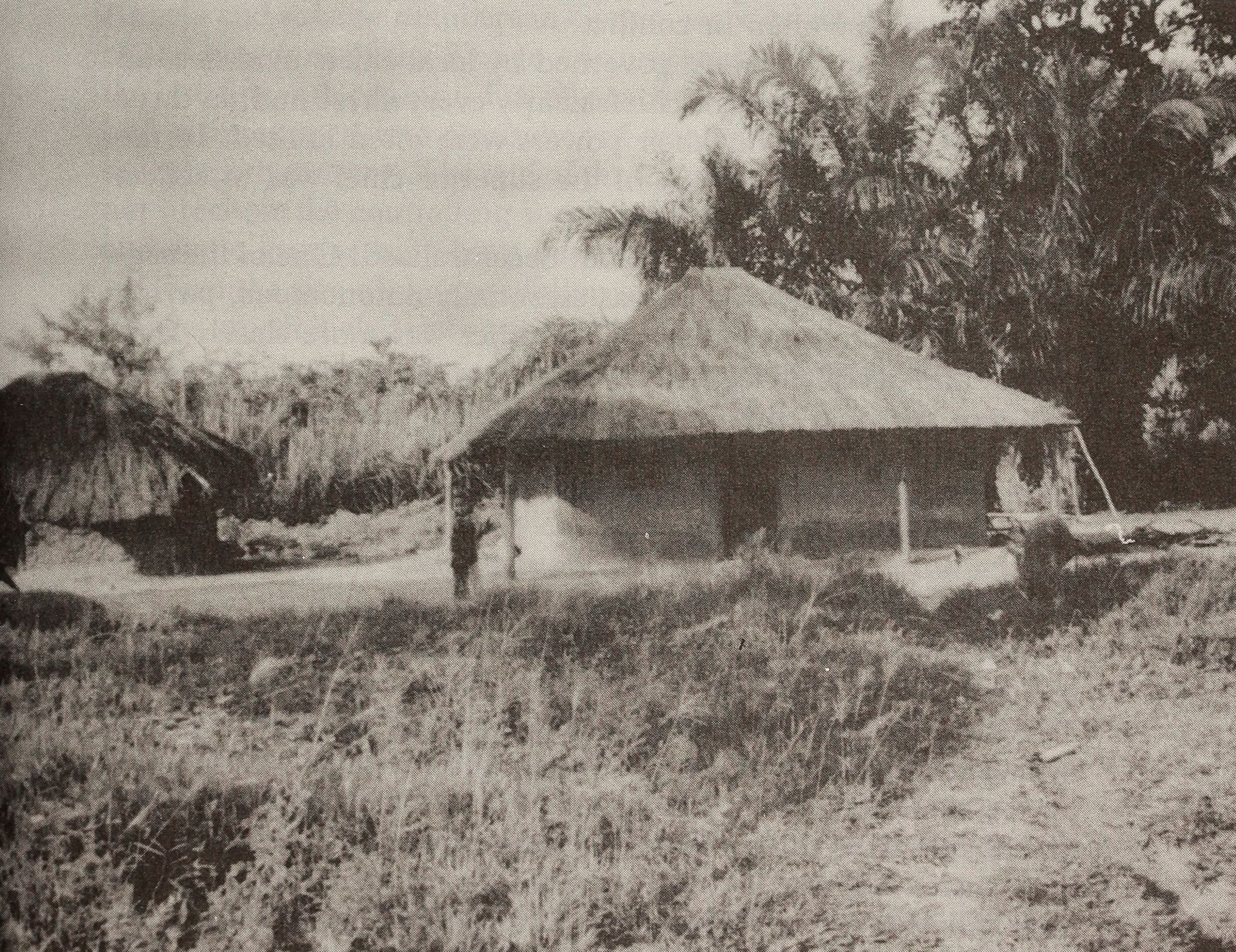
A traditional square-shaped hut with a thatched roof, typical of the Kasaï-Oriental, which offers shelter from heavy rains.

Kasaï-Oriental is inhabited by members of the Luba people.

Congo obtained independence from Belgium in 1960. Friction with Congo's other ethnic groups and encouragement by Belgian corporations hoping to keep their mining concessions led to the secession of the province of South Kasai as a separate state headed by Albert Kalonji.

After being repulsed, the Congo occupied the province in September 1961. Several thousand people were killed during the "pacification" of South Kasai, which lasted through the spring of 1962.

The population of Mbuji-Mayi grew rapidly with the immigration of Luba people from other parts of the country.

== Diamond mining ==
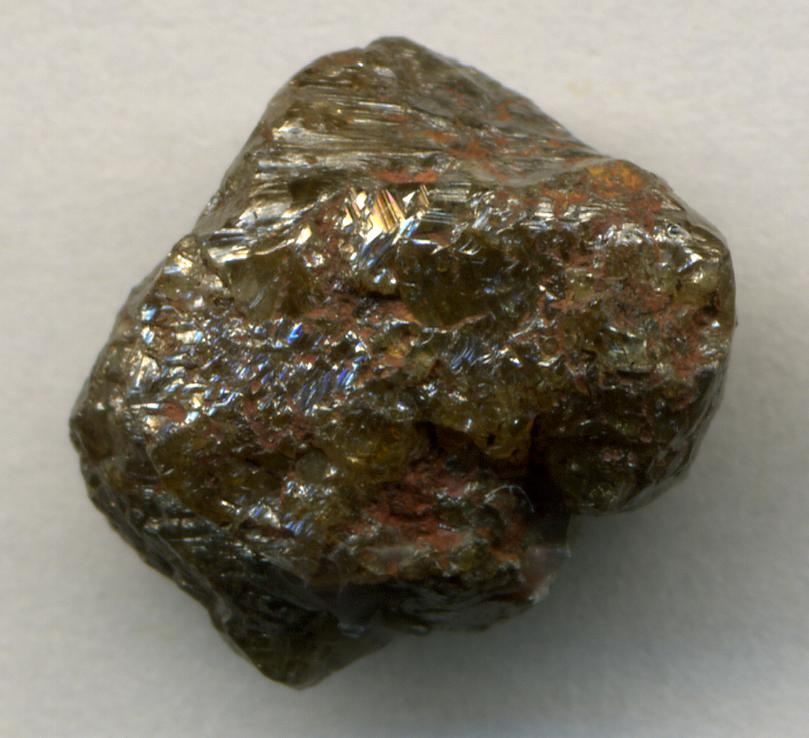
Diamond (1.3 cm across), Kasai-Oriental province

The region in which Mbuji-Mayi is situated annually produces one-tenth in weight of the world's industrial diamonds, with mining managed by the Société Minière de Bakwanga. This is the largest accumulation of diamonds in the world, more concentrated than those at Kimberley, South Africa. Mbuji-Mayi handles most of the industrial diamonds produced in the Congo.

== Political divisions ==
The former Kasai-Oriental was divided into the three districts of Tshilenge, Kabinda, and Sankuru; and the two cities of Mbuji-Mayi and Mwene-Ditu. These were further divided into a total of 16 territories and 8 communes.

== Languages ==
French is the official language. Tshiluba is one of the four national languages of the Democratic Republic of the Congo. Tshiluba is spoken by about 6.3 million people in the Kasai region.

== Education ==
- University of Mbuji Mayi

== See also ==
- List of governors of Kasaï Oriental Province
