= Kanyama Territory =

Territory in the Democratic Republic of the Congo

Kanyama Wilaya ya Kanyama (Swahili)
- Territory
- Interactive map of Kanyama
- Country: DR Congo
- Province: Haut-Lomami
- Time zone: UTC+2 (CAT)

Kanyama or Kaniama is a territory in the Haut-Lomami province of the Democratic Republic of the Congo.
