= Kabongo Territory =

Kabongo Wilaya ya Kabongo (Swahili)
- Territory
- Interactive map of Kabongo
- Location within Democratic Republic of the Congo
- Coordinates: 7.2°S 25.5°E
- Country: DR Congo
- Province: Haut-Lomami

Area
  - Total: 20,621 km^{2} (7,962 sq mi)

Population
  - Total: 912,069
  - Density: 44.230/km^{2} (114.56/sq mi)
- Time zone: UTC+2 (CAT)

Kabongo is a territory in the Haut-Lomami province of the Democratic Republic of the Congo.
