= Mobayi-Mbongo (territory) =

Territory of Mobayi-Mbongo
- Territory
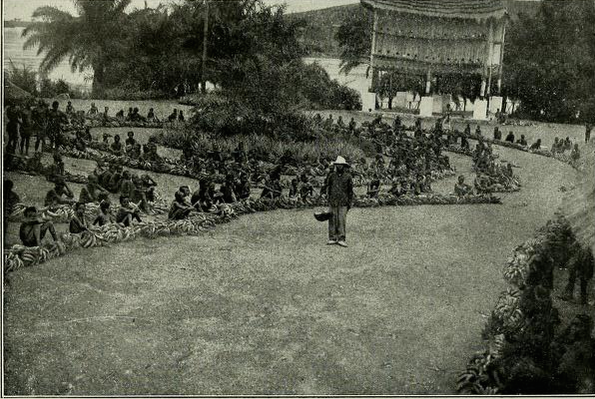
- Children carrying bananas (1906)
- Interactive map of Territory of Mobayi-Mbongo
- Country: DR Congo
- Province: Nord-Ubangi

Area
  - Total: 10,078 km^{2} (3,891 sq mi)

Population (2020)
  - Total: 251,173
  - Density: 24.923/km^{2} (64.550/sq mi)
- Time zone: UTC+1 (WAT)

Mobayi-Mbongo is a rural area of the province of Nord-Ubangi in the Democratic Republic of Congo (French: République démocratique du Congo).

The administrative jurisdiction was named Banzyville until 1972. It faces Mobaye in the Central African Republic.

== Subdivisions ==
The territory consists of the commune (municipality) of Mobayi-Mbongo, and two secteurs (sectors or neighbourhoods).

Subdivision	Status	Notes
Mobayi-Mbongo	Commune	7 municipal councillors
Mobayi-Mbongo	Sector	95 villages in 16 groups
Oto-Mbanza	Sector	113 villages in 15 groups

== Demographics ==
Historical population
Year	1994	2004
Pop.	51,641	76,476
±%	—	+48.1%
