= Lusambo Territory =

Lusambo
- Territory
- Interactive map of Lusambo
- Coordinates: 5.1892562°S 23.8533681°E
- Country: DR Congo
- Province: Sankuru
- HQ: Mpanya Mutombo

Area
  - Total: 16,508 km^{2} (6,374 sq mi)

Population
  - Total: 268,636
  - Density: 16.273/km^{2} (42.147/sq mi)
- Time zone: UTC+2 (CAT)

Lusambo is a territory of Sankuru province of the Democratic Republic of the Congo. After the town of Lusambo became a separately administered city, it was decided to move the territory's administrative center from there to the smaller town of Mpanya Mutombo.
