= Lomela Territory =

Coordinates: 2.2833°S 23.2667°E

Lomela
- Territory
- Interactive map of Lomela
- Country: DR Congo
- Province: Sankuru
- Time zone: UTC+2 (CAT)

Lomela is a territory of Sankuru province of the Democratic Republic of the Congo.
