= Haut-Uélé =

Province of the Democratic Republic of the Congo

Haut-Uélé Province du Haut-Uélé (French) Mkoa wa Wele Juu (Swahili) Wɛlɛ ya Likólo (Lingala)
- Province
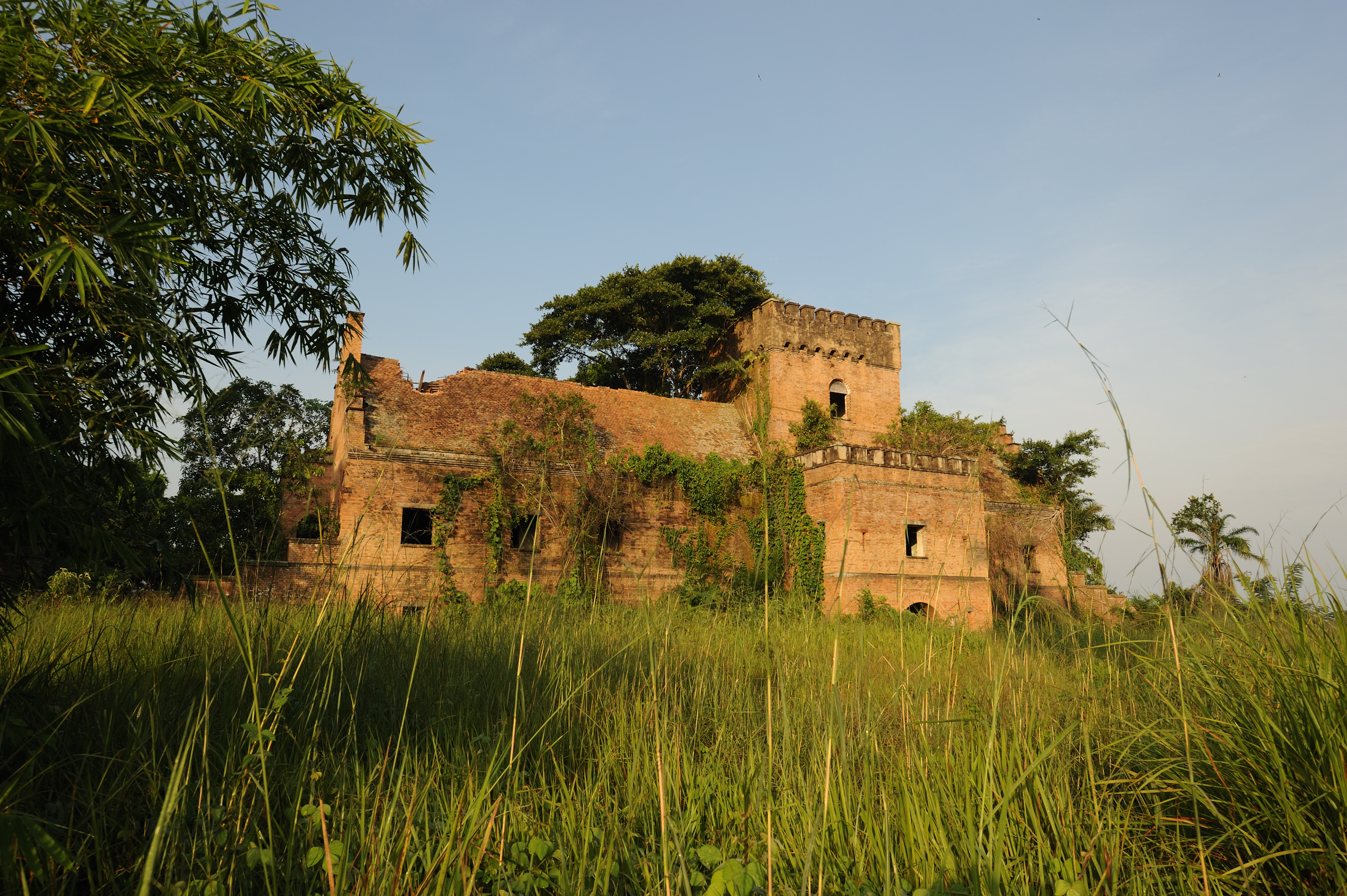

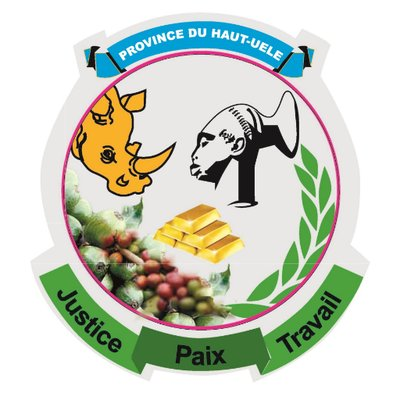
- Seal

- Coordinates: 2°46′35.02″N 27°37′4.48″E
- Country: DR Congo
- Established: 2015
- Named for: Uele River
- Capital: Isiro

Government
  - Governor: Jean Bakomito

Area
  - Total: 89,683 km^{2} (34,627 sq mi)
  - Rank: 14th

Population (2020 est.)
  - Total: 2,242,500
  - Rank: 17th
  - Density: 25.005/km^{2} (64.762/sq mi)

Ethnic groups
  - Native: Logo • Mamvu • Mangbetu • Azande • Mayogo • Baka • Mundu • Kakwa • Mangbele • Bangba • Barambo • Okebu • Bandaka • Bahema
  - Settler: Wodaabe
- Time zone: UTC+2 (Central Africa Time)
- License Plate Code: (Democratic Republic of the Congo) CGO / 06
- Official language: French
- National language: Lingala
- Website: https://twitter.com/DuUele

Haut-Uélé (French for "Upper Uélé") is one of the 21 provinces of the Democratic Republic of the Congo created in the 2015 repartitioning. Haut-Uélé, Bas-Uélé, Ituri, and Tshopo provinces are the result of the dismemberment of the former Orientale province. Haut-Uélé was formed from the Haut-Uélé district whose town of Isiro was elevated to capital city of the new province.

== Geography ==
Haut-Uélé is located in the northeastern Democratic Republic of the Congo. It borders the provinces of Ituri and Tshopo to the south, Ituri to the east, Bas-Uélé to the west, and has international borders with South Sudan and the Central African Republic to the north. The northern part of Haut-Uélé has a tropical savanna climate while the southern part has a tropical monsoon climate, according to the Köppen–Geiger climate classification.

== Administration ==
The province is divided in to six territories and one independently administered city.

Administrative division	Type	Map
Isiro	City	Isiro
Dungu	Territory	Dungu
Faradje	Territory	Faradje
Niangara	Territory	Niangara
Rungu	Territory	Rungu
Wamba	Territory	Wamba
Watsa	Territory	Watsa
