= Luilu Territory =

Coordinates: 7°18′S 23°38′E

Luilu
- Territory
- Interactive map of Luilu
- Country: DR Congo
- Province: Lomami

Area
  - Total: 11,874 km^{2} (4,585 sq mi)

Population (2020)
  - Total: 3,464,215
  - Density: 291.75/km^{2} (755.62/sq mi)
- Time zone: UTC+2 (CAT)

Luilu is a territory in Lomami province of the Democratic Republic of the Congo. It surrounds the city of Mwene-Ditu, which is administered separately.
