= Gandajika Territory =

Gandajika
- Territory
- Interactive map of Gandajika
- Coordinates: 6°46′S 24°03′E
- Country: DR Congo
- Province: Lomami
- Time zone: UTC+2 (CAT)

Gandajika or Ngandajika is a territory in Lomami province of the Democratic Republic of the Congo.
