= Lomami Province =

Province of the Democratic Republic of the Congo

Lomami Province du Lomami (French)
- Province
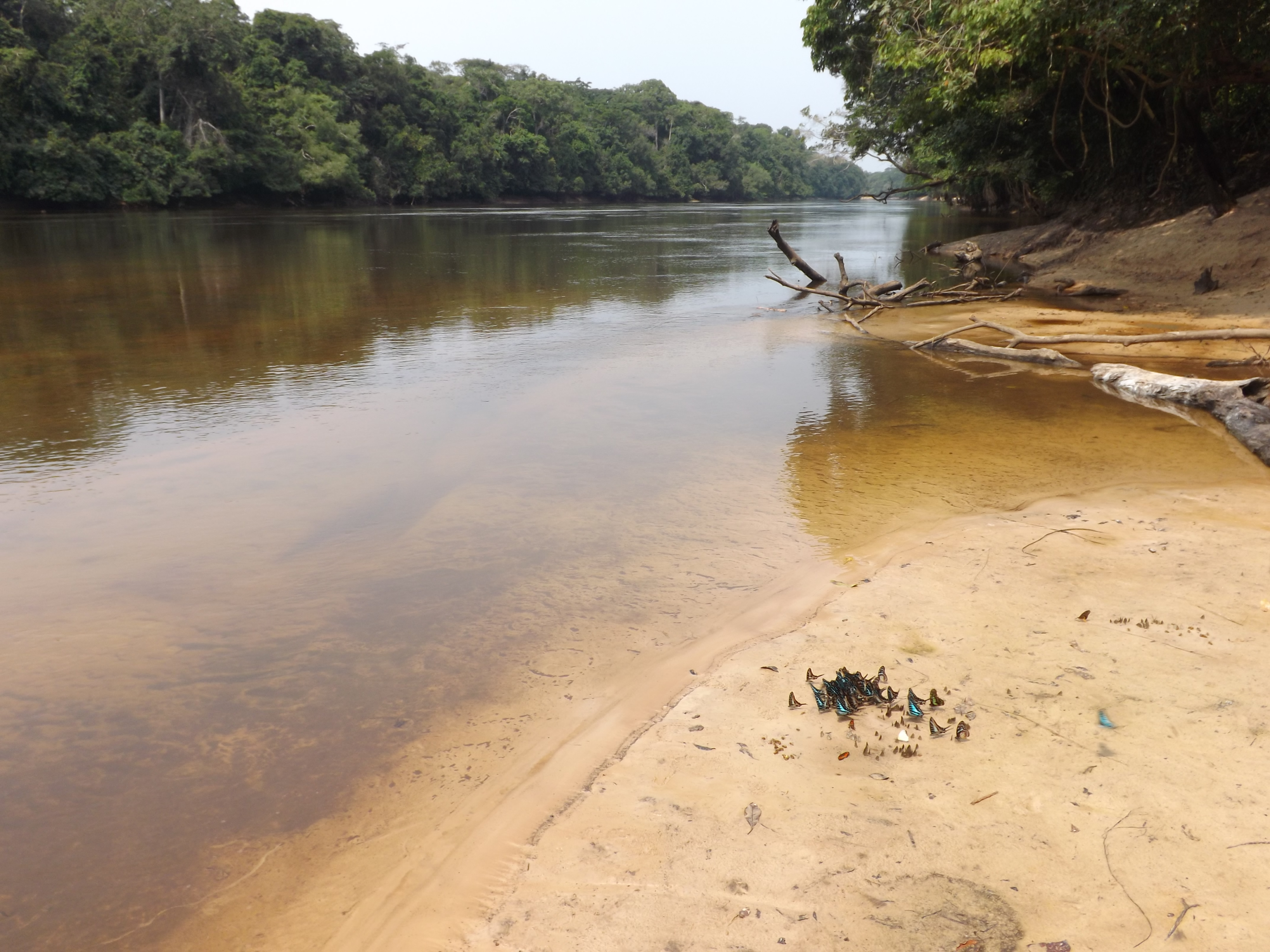
- View of the Lomami River

- Seal

- Coordinates: 06°08′S 24°29′E
- Country: DR Congo
- Established: 2015
- Named for: Lomami River
- Capital: Kabinda
- Largest city: Mwene Ditu

Government
  - Governor: Iron-Van Kalombo

Area
  - Total: 56,426 km^{2} (21,786 sq mi)
  - Rank: 22nd

Population (2020)
  - Total: 3,001,900
  - Rank: 15th
  - Density: 53.201/km^{2} (137.79/sq mi)
  - Native Ethnic groups: Baluba • Basongye • Lokele

Languages
  - Official: French
  - National: Tshiluba
- Time zone: UTC+02:00 (CAT)
- License Plate Code: (Democratic Republic of the Congo) CGO / 13

Lomami is one of the 21 newest provinces of the Democratic Republic of the Congo created in the 2015 repartitioning. Lomami, Kasaï-Oriental, and Sankuru provinces are the result of the dismemberment of the former Kasaï-Oriental province. Lomami was formed from the Kabinda district and the independently administered city of Mwene-Ditu. The town of Kabinda was elevated to capital city of the new province.

== History ==
Formerly part of the Lualaba district in what is now Katanga (1908-1947), it became part of Kasaï-Oriental in 1965. It was created in 2015 following the split of the historical Kasaï-Oriental province, as provided for in the 2005 constitution.

== Administration ==
Lomami is divided in to five territories and two independently administered cities.

Administrative division	Type	Map
Kabinda	City	Kabinda
Mwene-Ditu	City	Mwene-Ditu
Kabinda	Territory	Kabinda
Kamiji	Territory	Kamiji
Lubao	Territory	Lubao
Luilu	Territory	Luilu
Ngandajika	Territory	Ngandajika

== Demographics ==
The population is estimated at 2,345,000 inhabitants, mainly located in the cities of Kabinda and Mweneditu. It consists of three major ethnic groups, the Songye, Luba, and Kanyok). There are also the Kele in Kamiji and the Kanitshin in Luilu.

== Economy ==
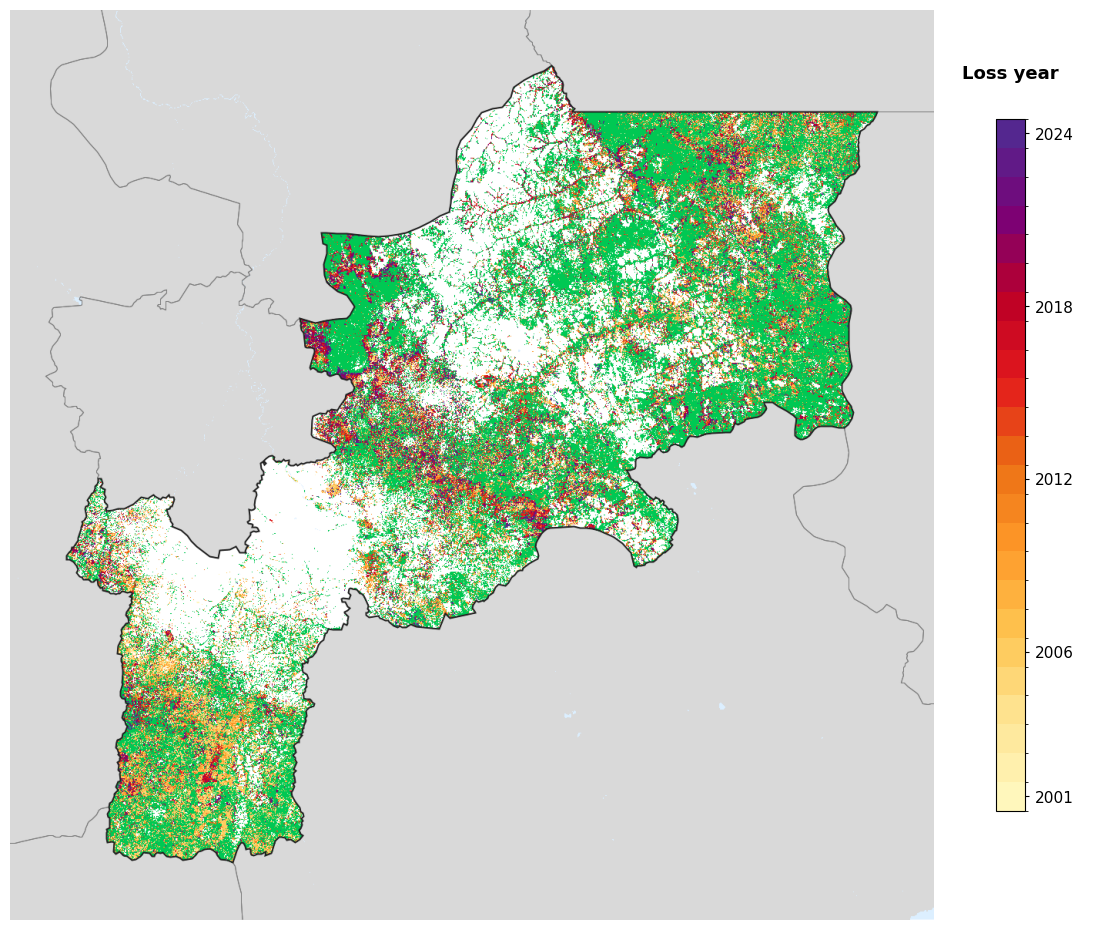
Tree-cover loss year in Lomami, 2001-2024, from the Global Forest Change dataset.

The Kabinda district is primarily agro-pastoral, with some artisanal diamond mining activities in Lubao, Luputa, Kabinda, and Wikong. There is also artisanal gold mining throughout the Luilu territory. In addition to diamonds, which are extensively mined, other exploitable mineral resources exist:

- Significant deposits of carbonate rocks in Ngandajika.
- Gold deposits around Mwene-Ditu and Luputa.
- Coltan in Luilu (near Luputa).

The district was once a major cotton producer, but this industry no longer exists due to the lack of markets it had during the colonial era, primarily in Belgium. There is a cotton research center in N’Gandajika. N'Gandajika and Kamiji are major agricultural centers that supply the Kasaï-Oriental Province, particularly the city of Mbujimayi, which has an estimated population of over 2 million inhabitants.

The city of Mweneditu has banking services, such as those of the Congolese Bank. There is also a forest rich in wood north of Kabinda.

== Transportation ==
Rail transport is important in Mweneditu, although it is in a very advanced state of disrepair. The district has only one airport in Kabinda, which is less significant for opening up the district and is practically unused by national standards. There are airstrips left by the Belgians in Kabinda, Gandajika, Luputa, and Muene Ditu, and a Presbyterian airstrip in Kasha (7 km from Luputa). These airstrips are in a very advanced state of degradation. There is practically no aviation service in the entire district, which must depend on the Mbujimayi airport. Ngandajika and Lubao also have airstrips used only for humanitarian purposes by NGOs. Bicycles and currently motorcycles are the main means of transport; the district remains one of the poorest in the country and will face many challenges, such as maintaining the Mbuji-Mayi road towards Mwene-Ditu, which connects the main station to the diamond town, and constructing the Mbuji-Mayi - Kabinda road or paving numerous streets.

== Infrastructure ==
Public electricity is virtually non-existent throughout the district, except for a few wealthy individuals, the SNCC network in Mwene-Ditu, and missionaries who use generators and now increasingly photovoltaic energy. SNEL and especially SNCC provide irregular service in Mweneditu, serving a clientele of no more than 5,000 people out of a population of over 500,000 inhabitants. The district is not sufficiently supplied with drinking water, which explains the high prevalence of polio and childhood blindness. A potable water distribution network exists in Luputa thanks to funding from the Church of Jesus Christ of Latter-day Saints (Mormons), which enabled the water supply from the natural source of Kaya Lubil near Lusuku. Regideso, which exists only in Mwene-Ditu like SNEL, offers mediocre services to a few subscribers in Mwene-Ditu, numbering no more than 3,000 souls.

The National Rural Water Service (SNHR) is also present, building wells, springs, and water supplies in Mweneditu, Ngandajika, Lubao, and Kabinda. Many of these sources are no longer operational due to lack of maintenance, as is the case for wells equipped with pumps.

Moreover, the capital Kabinda has no collective water supply, electricity, or public lighting services. There is, however, a thermal power plant with three cabins of 75 KVA each, but it has been out of service since 1992. Two cellular phone towers have been installed since 2003. Postal or banking services are nonexistent.

A large dam costing 22 million US dollars could be built near the Mwangalayi Falls on the Luilu River.

== Education ==
The city of Kabinda has more than five higher education institutions, including ISTM/KA, ISTMRKA, ISTIA, and two university institutions: UNIKAB and UNILO. The University of Our Lady of Lomami (UNILO) was a Catholic university institution, and is now public. The University of Mwene-Ditu is the province's main university in terms of infrastructure, number of students, and academic staff, with its seven faculties offering 14 programs. There is currently a higher institute of medical techniques located in Kalenda next to the old FOMULAC buildings in the Luilu territory. Compared to national standards, the level is less competitive, causing the Lomami Province to lose many young people who migrate to Mbuji-Mayi, Lubumbashi, and Kinshasa for better education. Lomami hosts a knowledge center, creating a connection site that once made history.

== See also ==
Kasai region
