= Kole Territory =

Kole
- Territory
- Interactive map of Kole
- Coordinates: 3°28′S 22°27′E
- Country: DR Congo
- Province: Sankuru
- Seat: Kole

Government
  - Type: Territory

Area
  - Total: 16,192 km^{2} (6,252 sq mi)

Population (2020)
  - Total: 844,015
  - Density: 52.125/km^{2} (135.00/sq mi)
- Time zone: UTC+2 (CAT)

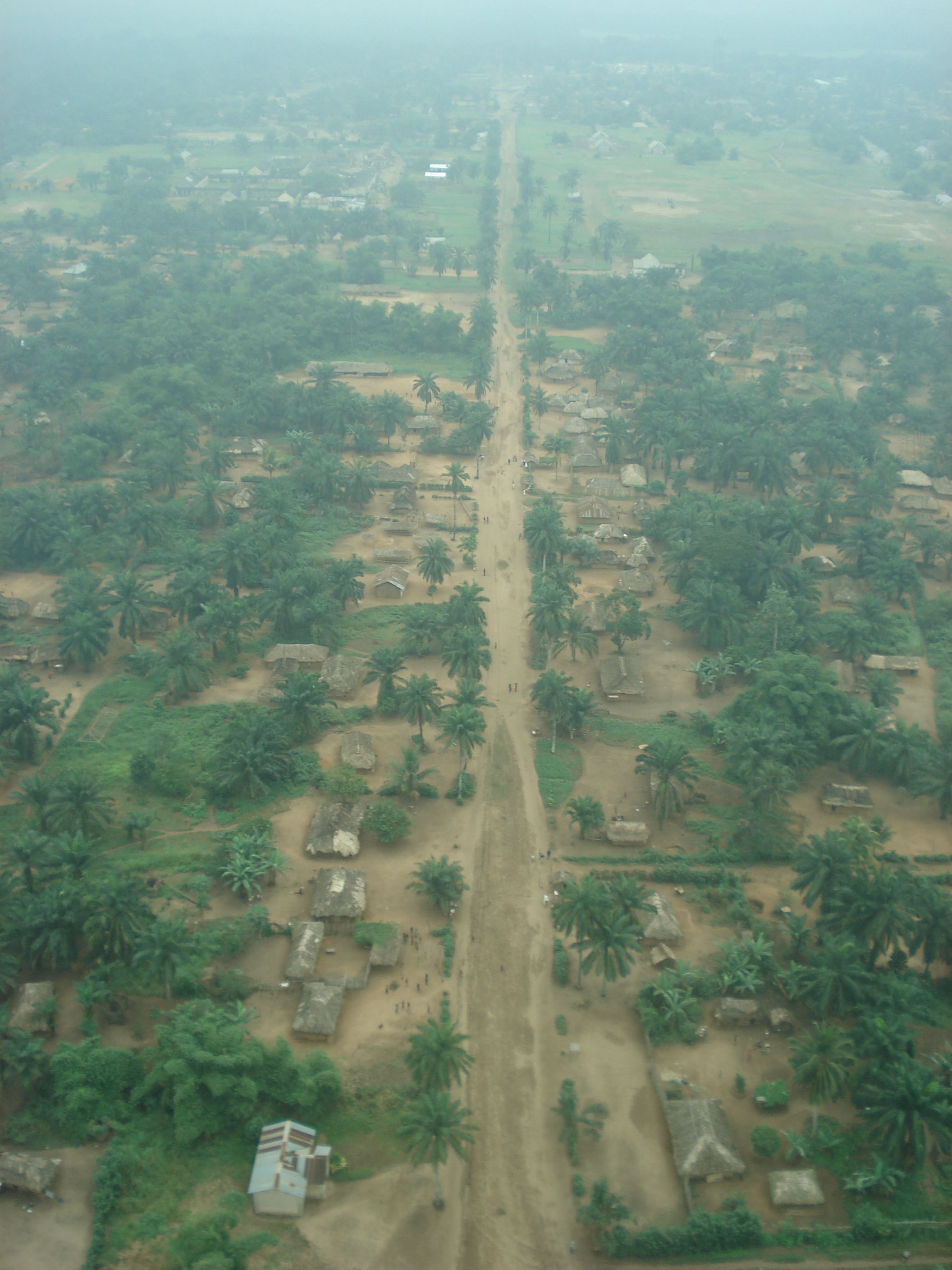
Aerial view of Kole, Democratic Republic of the Congo.

Kole is a territory in Sankuru province of the Democratic Republic of the Congo.

== Villages ==
The main village is Kole. Other villages include:

- Gengwa
