= Lubao Territory =

Lubao
- Territory
- Interactive map of Lubao
- Country: DR Congo
- Province: Lomami
- Time zone: UTC+2 (CAT)

Lubao is a territory of Lomami province of the Democratic Republic of the Congo. Its capital is Lubao.
