= Kabinda Territory =

Kabinda
- Territory
- Interactive map of Kabinda
- Coordinates: 6.454737°S 24.611227°E
- Country: DR Congo
- Province: Lomami
- HQ: Kamende

Area
  - Total: 14,373 km^{2} (5,549 sq mi)

Population (2020)
  - Total: 1,430,504
  - Density: 99.527/km^{2} (257.77/sq mi)
- Time zone: UTC+2 (CAT)

Kabinda is a territory of Lomami province in the Democratic Republic of the Congo. After the town of Kabinda became a separately administered city, it was decided to move the territory's administrative center from there to the smaller town of Kamende.
