= Haut-Lomami =

Province of the Democratic Republic of the Congo

Haut-Lomami Province du Haut-Lomami (French) Mkoa wa Lomami Juu (Swahili)
- Province
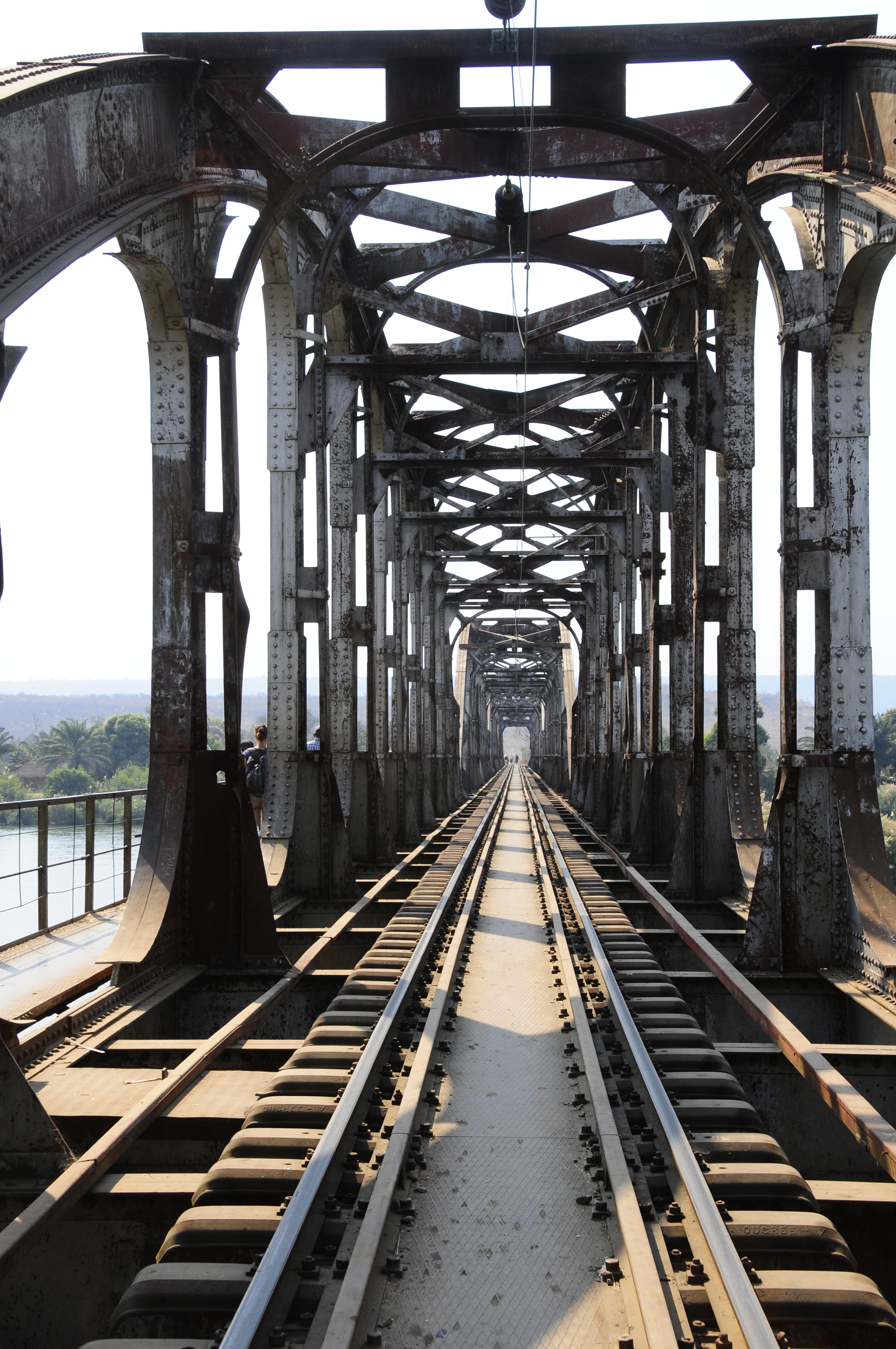

- Seal

- Coordinates: 8°44′S 24°59′E
- Country: DR Congo
- Established: 2015
- Named for: Lomami River
- Capital: Kamina

Government
  - Governor: Marmont Banza

Area
  - Total: 108,204 km^{2} (41,778 sq mi)

Population (2020 est.)
  - Total: 3,662,800
  - Density: 33.851/km^{2} (87.673/sq mi)

Ethnic groups
  - Native: Luba-Katanga (Baluba)
- Time zone: UTC+2 (CAT)
- License Plate Code: (Democratic Republic of the Congo) CGO / 05
- Official language: French
- National language: Swahili
- Non-national language: Kiluba

Haut-Lomami (French for "Upper Lomami") is one of the 21 provinces of the Democratic Republic of the Congo created in the 2015 repartitioning. Haut-Lomami, Haut-Katanga, Lualaba, and Tanganyika provinces are the result of the dismemberment of the former Katanga province. Haut-Lomami was formed from the Haut-Lomami district whose town of Kamina was elevated to capital city of the new province.

== Administration ==
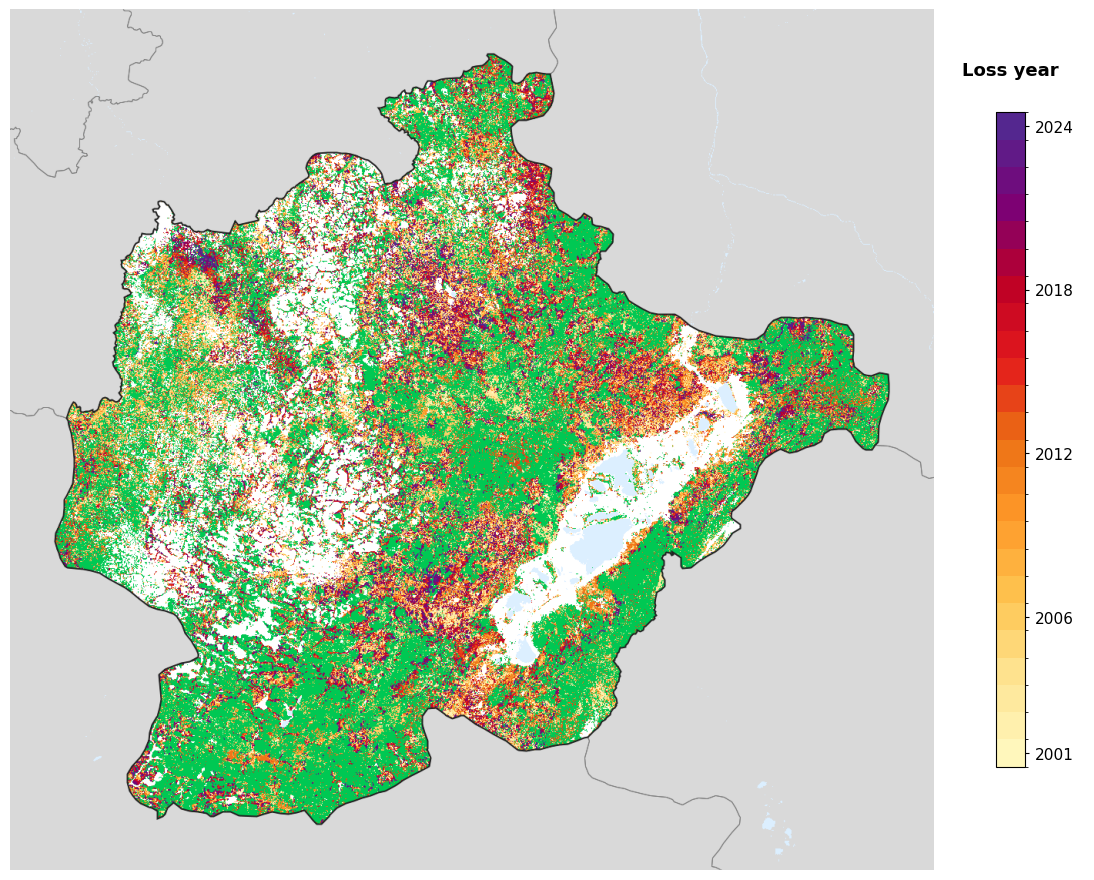
Tree-cover loss year in Haut-Lomami, 2001-2024, from the Global Forest Change dataset.

Haut-Lomami is divided in to five territories and one independently administered city.

Administrative division	Type	Map
Kamina	City	Kamina
Bukama	Territory	Bukama
Kabongo	Territory	Kabongo
Kamina	Territory	Kamina
Kaniama	Territory	Kaniama
Malemba-Nkulu	Territory	Malemba-Nkulu

== See also ==
- History of Katanga
