= Provinces of the Democratic Republic of the Congo =

Provinces of the Democratic Republic of the Congo Provinces de la République démocratique du Congo (French)
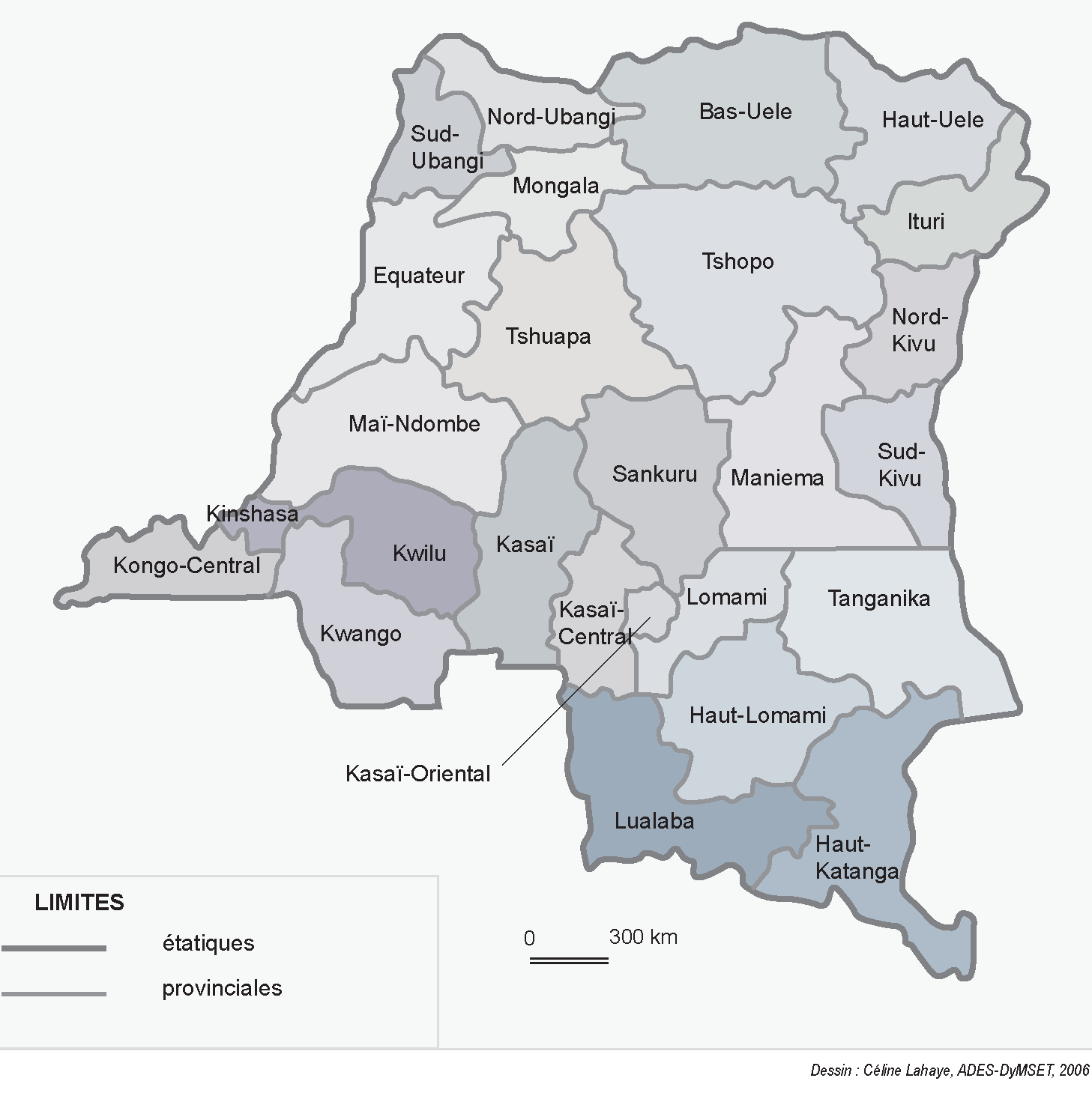
- Category: 1st-level administrative division of a unitary state
- Location: Democratic Republic of the Congo
- Number: 26 provinces (1 is a city-province)
- Populations: 1,411,000 (Bas-Uele) – 18,000,000 (Kinshasa)
- Areas: 9,545 km^{2} (3,685 sq mi) (Kasaï-Oriental) – 199,567 km^{2} (77,053 sq mi) (Tshopo)
- Government: Provincial government
- Subdivisions: Territory and City (Commune in Kinshasa)

Article 2 of the Constitution of the Democratic Republic of the Congo divides the country into the capital city of Kinshasa and 25 named provinces. It also gives the capital the status of a province. Therefore, in many contexts Kinshasa is regarded as the 26th province.

== Government ==
The provinces are governed by the provincial assembly and the provincial government. The provincial assembly is the legislative body and has elected deputies and a bureau consisting of a president, vice-president, questeur, rapporteur, and deputy rapporteur. The provincial government consists of the governor, vice-governor, and provincial ministers. The provincial director advises the governor and coordinates the work of 50 departmental directorates and inspectorates. These offices represent national ministries at the provincial level and implement government policies and regulations.

=== Provincial assembly ===
==== Deputies and election ====
The provincial assembly is made up of provincial deputies (députés provinciaux), who serve five-year terms that can be renewed. Under the Constitution of the Democratic Republic of the Congo, deputies may be elected or co-opted. However, the number of co-opted members must not exceed one-tenth of the number of elected deputies.

Provincial deputies are chosen through direct and secret universal suffrage, which allows voters to select their representatives without an intermediary. When a constituency has only one seat, the candidate with the most votes is elected. For constituencies with two or more seats, an open-list proportional system is used. Voters cast one preferential vote, and seats are assigned using the largest-remainder method.

Except for Kinshasa, the consistuencies are the cities and territories of the province. In Kinshasa the constituencies are the communes. Candidates also take part in an official campaign period, similar to the one held for National Assembly elections. During this time, they can meet voters, introduce themselves, and seek support for their election.

Thirty days before election day, the Independent National Electoral Commission (Commission Électorale Nationale Indépendante; CENI) announces the number of polling stations in each constituency and sets the areas they serve. Polling stations cannot be set up in places of worship, the offices of political parties, trade unions or non-governmental organizations, bars, police stations, military camps, or military schools and academies. Once voting is complete, officials count the votes at each polling station and send the election records to the CENI's results center. The CENI then announces the final results 48 hours after receiving the provisional results, as long as no appeal has been filed.

==== Co-optation, substitution, and electoral disputes ====
Co-optation means that members of an existing body select additional members. In the Democratic Republic of the Congo, the constitution provides for this process to allow traditional authorities to join the provincial assembly. These seats are reserved for traditional chiefs as part of their role in public affairs. The process takes place during the special session that opens the provincial assembly. Once the elected deputies' mandates have been confirmed, they select the traditional chiefs proposed for co-opted seats. At least two-thirds of the deputies present must take part. If this requirement is not met, the assembly must meet again within eight days. At the second meeting, it can proceed regardless of the number of deputies present.

The selection takes place under the leadership of the provisional president. After checking the deputies' credentials, the provisional bureau sets a date for the process and informs the CENI. To prepare the list of candidates, the CENI's provincial office calls a meeting of all traditional chiefs in the province, held at the provincial capital or another chosen location. Chiefs who cannot attend may send representatives.

One candidate is put forward for each territory, with the province's ethnic diversity taken into account. The chiefs present, including those represented by others, review and approve the candidates. The list of candidates must reach the provincial assembly at least three days before the selection takes place. Although traditional chiefs may enter the assembly through co-optation, elected deputies remain responsible for choosing them. There are also more elected seats than co-opted seats. Under the constitution, co-opted deputies cannot account for more than one-tenth of the assembly's total membership.

Under Article 13 of the Law on Fundamental Principles Relating to the Free Administration of Provinces, certain positions cannot be held at the same time as the office of provincial deputy. For this reason, a system of substitute members was introduced. Candidates for the provincial assembly must name their substitutes when they stand for election. When a provincial deputy is appointed to the provincial or central government, their seat is filled by a substitute until the end of the term. A substitute also takes over if the elected deputy dies. However, substitutes who choose to leave their political party during the term lose their right to take the seat.

To protect fair elections, efforts are made to prevent pressure on voters, physical or mental threats, fraud, and vote-buying. Although it is difficult to prevent every case of fraud or error, these problems can be reduced. Electoral disputes can therefore be brought before the courts. The competent Court of Appeal handles these cases free of charge and must give its decision within seven days of receiving the case. The court's ruling is then sent to the CENI, the candidate involved, and the provisional bureau of the provincial assembly.

==== Powers ====
The provincial assembly has two main responsibilities: making laws through provincial edicts and overseeing the provincial government and provincial and local public services. It can pass edicts only in areas where the constitution gives the provinces authority.

The assembly follows two types of lawmaking procedures: the ordinary procedure and the special procedure. The ordinary procedure applies to the drafting and adoption of provincial edicts. Some matters, however, require a special process. These include financial edicts, referrals to the Constitutional Court, and enabling edicts.

The provincial budget takes the form of a financial edict, which gives it legal force. Through this process, provincial deputies provide the provincial government with the means to carry out its programme. Only the provincial government can propose a financial edict; individual deputies cannot introduce one. The budget must also be submitted by a set deadline. Failure to meet this deadline may lead to consequences, including the resignation of the provincial government. The assembly can bring a matter before the Constitutional Court in two situations. The first is when a provincial edict that is awaiting approval is found to go against the constitution. The second is when the central and provincial governments disagree over their respective powers. The president of the provincial assembly may then ask the Constitutional Court to interpret the constitution. The request must be approved by either the assembly's bureau or the full assembly during a session. It must also be written, signed by the person making the request, and addressed to the president of the Constitutional Court. If the president of the full assembly starts the process, the request must be presented at the next session.

== List ==
Map	Province	ISO 3166-2 Code	Capital	Area in km^{2} (sq mi)	Population (2019)	Population density (per km^{2}in 2019)	Previous province	Time zone
1	Kinshasa	KN	–	9,965 (3,848)	13,916,000	1,396.5	Kinshasa	UTC+1
2	Kongo Central	BC	Matadi	53,920 (20,820)	6,365,000	118	Bas-Congo	UTC+1
3	Kwango	KG	Kenge	89,974 (34,739)	2,416,000	26.9	Bandundu	UTC+1
4	Kwilu	KL	Bandundu	78,533 (30,322)	6,169,000	78.6	Bandundu	UTC+1
5	Mai-Ndombe	MN	Inongo	127,243 (49,129)	2,082,000	16.4	Bandundu	UTC+1
6	Kasaï	KS	Tshikapa	95,631 (36,923)	3,165,000	33.1	Kasaï-Occidental	UTC+2
7	Kasaï-Central	KC	Kananga	59,500 (23,000)	3,743,000	62.9	Kasaï-Occidental	UTC+2
8	Kasaï-Oriental	KE	Mbuji-Mayi	9,545 (3,685)	3,601,000	377.3	Kasaï-Oriental	UTC+2
9	Lomami	LO	Kabinda	56,426 (21,786)	2,801,000	49.6	Kasaï-Oriental	UTC+2
10	Sankuru	SA	Lusambo	104,331 (40,282)	2,417,000	23.2	Kasaï-Oriental	UTC+2
11	Maniema	MA	Kindu	132,250 (51,060)	2,654,000	20.1	Maniema	UTC+2
12	South Kivu	SK	Bukavu	64,791 (25,016)	6,565,000	101.3	South Kivu	UTC+2
13	North Kivu	NK	Goma	59,483 (22,967)	7,574,000	127.3	North Kivu	UTC+2
14	Ituri	IT	Bunia	65,658 (25,351)	4,008,000	61	Orientale	UTC+2
15	Haut-Uele	HU	Isiro	89,683 (34,627)	2,046,000	22.8	Orientale	UTC+2
16	Tshopo	TO	Kisangani	199,567 (77,053)	2,582,000	12.9	Orientale	UTC+2
17	Bas-Uele	BU	Buta	148,331 (57,271)	1,250,000	8.4	Orientale	UTC+2
18	Nord-Ubangi	NU	Gbadolite	56,644 (21,870)	1,425,000	25.1	Équateur	UTC+1
19	Mongala	MO	Lisala	58,141 (22,448)	1,950,000	33.5	Équateur	UTC+1
20	Sud-Ubangi	SU	Gemena	51,648 (19,941)	2,755,000	53.3	Équateur	UTC+1
21	Équateur	EQ	Mbandaka	103,902 (40,117)	1,712,000	16.5	Équateur	UTC+1
22	Tshuapa	TU	Boende	132,957 (51,335)	1,789,000	13.5	Équateur	UTC+1
23	Tanganyika	TA	Kalemie	134,940 (52,100)	3,570,000	24.5	Katanga	UTC+2
24	Haut-Lomami	HL	Kamina	108,204 (41,778)	3,444,000	31.8	Katanga	UTC+2
25	Lualaba	LU	Kolwezi	121,308 (46,837)	2,993,000	24.7	Katanga	UTC+2
26	Haut-Katanga	HK	Lubumbashi	132,425 (51,130)	5,378,000	40.6	Katanga	UTC+2

== History ==
When Belgium annexed the Belgian Congo as a colony in November 1908, it was initially organised into 22 districts. Ten western districts were administered directly by the main colonial government, while the eastern part of the colony was administered under two vice-governments: eight northeastern districts formed Orientale Province, and four southeastern districts formed Katanga. In 1919, the colony was organised into four provinces:

- Congo-Kasaï (five southwestern districts),
- Équateur (five northwestern districts),
- Orientale Province and Katanga (previous vice-governments).

In 1932, the colony was reorganised into six provinces. Initially they were named after their capital cities, but in 1947 regional names were adopted.

Belgian Congo became an independent country in 1960, named Republic of the Congo. Under the first constitution, the Loi Fondamentale, six provinces were provided for: Equateur, Kasai, Katanga, Kivu, Leopoldville, and Orientale. The provinces were organized with their own elected assemblies and parliamentary governments responsible to them. Provincial authorities had the power to organise the "political structures of the province within the framework of the general principles contained in the Loi Fondamentale", manage provincial police and judicial officials, establish educational systems lower than higher education, tend to agricultural and mining concessions, construct and maintain local railways, roads, and public works, and manage their own finances, though their funding was heavily subsidized by the central government. Social legislation and national minimum wages were to be concurrent powers shared with central authorities. All other duties and responsibilities rested with the central government. As central authority collapsed due to the outbreak of the Congo Crisis following an army mutiny in July, provincial governments were able to leverage the situation to increase their political autonomy.

The disintegration of central authority led to numerous political discussions aimed at reconciliation and territorial reorganization marked by various political leaders arguing for the creation of new provinces from which many of them sought to personally benefit. In August 1962, 16 additional provinces were promulgated. By 1963, the country was organised into 21 provinces (informally called provincettes) plus the capital city of Léopoldville, similar to the original 22 districts under colonial rule. This framework was confirmed in the Luluabourg Constitution, promulgated in 1964.

Following a coup on 24 November 1965, Colonel Joseph Mobutu became president of the country and the constitution was suspended. Measures were instituted to reduce provincial autonomy and increase political centralisation. On 6 April 1966, a presidential decree reduced the number of provinces to 12. On 24 December, Mobutu declared that the number of provinces would be further reduced to eight. Under the constitution of 27 June 1976, provincial assemblies and ministers were eliminated in favor of appointed governors and advisory bodies. The constitution also left the organisation of provinces to be determined by law.

In 1971, the country was renamed Zaire, and three provinces were also renamed. In 1975, the capital city of Kinshasa obtained the status of a province. In 1988, the province of Kivu was split into three. In 1997, the country was renamed Democratic Republic of the Congo, and the three provinces that had been renamed in 1971 either retook their previous name or took another.

Article 2 of the Constitution of the Democratic Republic of the Congo, adopted in 2006, specifies a territorial organisation into 26 provinces, again resembling the previous provincettes and original colonial districts. The reorganisation was scheduled to take effect within three years of the new constitution's promulgation, however progress was slow. In October 2007 the Minister for Decentralisation, Denis Kalume Numbi, presented a bill for decentralisation in the National Assembly. The subsequent debate turned up a variety of issues that first had to be addressed with changes to related laws. In an October 2010 conclave of the ruling AMP coalition, it was proposed to revise Article 226, which calls for the creation of 26 provinces out of the current 11, in order to allow more time for the transition. On 9 January 2015 the National Assembly passed a law on the new administrative divisions of the country, according to which new provinces should be installed in period of 12 months.

=== Maps ===
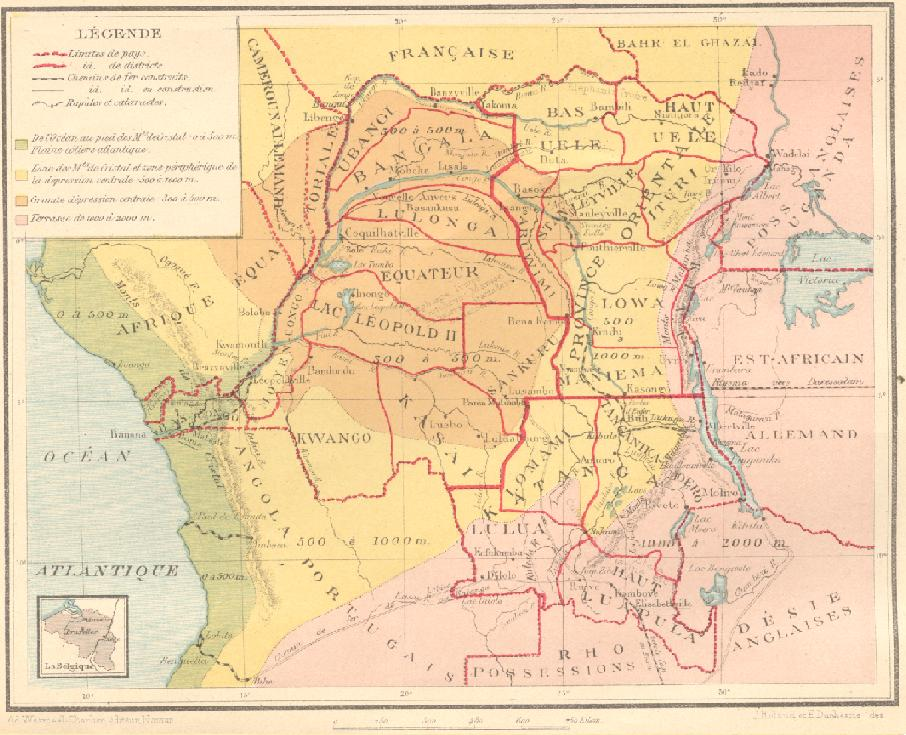
Districts of the Belgian Congo in 1914

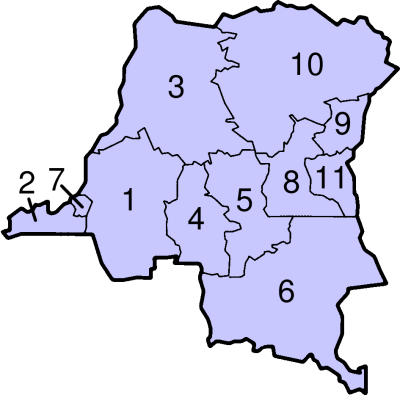
Provinces of the Democratic Republic of the Congo, 1997–2015

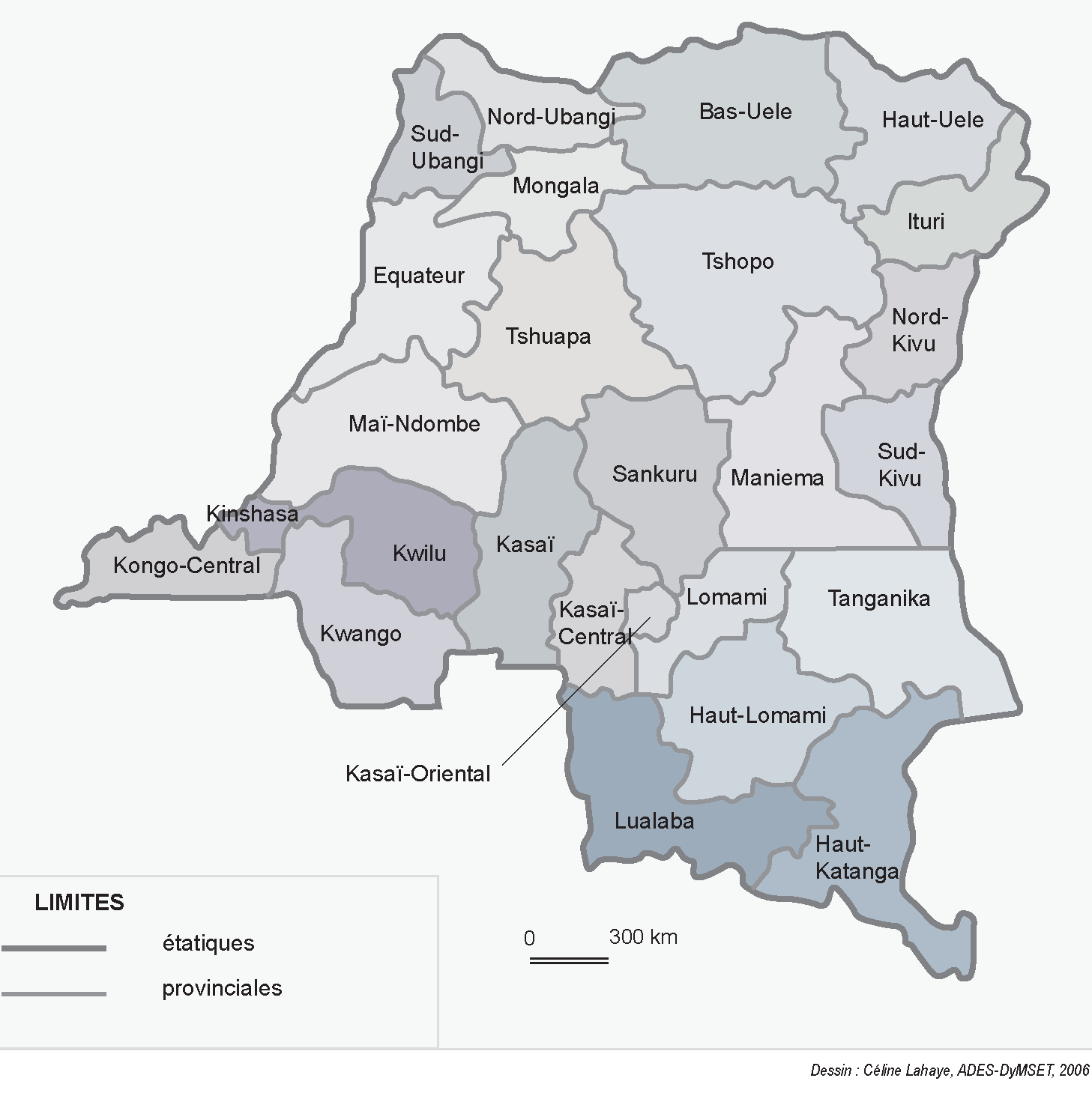
Provinces since 2015 (officially formed in 2006)

=== Approximate correspondence between historical and current provinces ===
Approximate correspondence between historical and current provinces
Belgian Congo				First Republic		Second Republic (Zaire)		Third Republic	
1908	1919	1932	1947	1963	1966	1971	1988	1997	2015
22 districts	4 provinces	6 provinces	6 provinces	21 provinces + capital	8 provinces + capital	8 regions + capital	11 regions	11 provinces	26 provinces
Tanganika-Moero	Katanga	Élisabethville	Katanga	Nord-Katanga	Katanga	Shaba		Katanga	Tanganyika
Tanganika-Moero	Katanga	Élisabethville	Katanga	Nord-Katanga	Katanga	Shaba		Katanga	Haut-Lomami
Lulua	Katanga	Élisabethville	Katanga	Lualaba	Katanga	Shaba		Katanga	Lualaba
Haut-Luapula	Katanga	Élisabethville	Katanga	Katanga-Oriental	Katanga	Shaba		Katanga	Haut-Katanga
Lomami	Katanga	Lusambo	Kasaï	Lomami	Kasaï-Oriental				Lomami
Sankuru	Congo-Kasaï	Lusambo	Kasaï	Sankuru	Kasaï-Oriental				Sankuru
Kasaï	Congo-Kasaï	Lusambo	Kasaï	Sud-Kasaï	Kasaï-Oriental				Kasaï-Oriental
Kasaï	Congo-Kasaï	Lusambo	Kasaï	Luluabourg	Kasaï-Occidental				Kasaï-Central
Kasaï	Congo-Kasaï	Lusambo	Kasaï	Unité-Kasaïenne	Kasaï-Occidental				Kasaï
Moyen-Congo	Congo-Kasaï	Léopoldville		Léopoldville	Kinshasa				
Bas-Congo	Congo-Kasaï	Léopoldville		Congo-Central		Bas-Zaïre		Bas-Congo	Kongo Central
Kwango	Congo-Kasaï	Léopoldville		Kwango	Bandundu				Kwango
Kwango	Congo-Kasaï	Léopoldville		Kwilu	Bandundu				Kwilu
Lac Léopold II	Équateur	Léopoldville		Mai-Ndombe	Bandundu				Mai-Ndombe
Équateur	Équateur	Coquilhatville	Équateur	Cuvette-Centrale	Équateur				Équateur
Équateur	Équateur	Coquilhatville	Équateur	Cuvette-Centrale	Équateur				Tshuapa
Lulonga	Équateur	Coquilhatville	Équateur	Moyen-Congo	Équateur				Mongala
Bangala	Équateur	Coquilhatville	Équateur	Moyen-Congo	Équateur				Mongala
Ubangi	Équateur	Coquilhatville	Équateur	Ubangi	Équateur				Nord-Ubangi
Ubangi	Équateur	Coquilhatville	Équateur	Ubangi	Équateur				Sud-Ubangi
Bas-Uele	Orientale	Stanleyville	Orientale	Uele	Orientale	Haut-Zaïre		Orientale	Bas-Uele
Haut-Uele	Orientale	Stanleyville	Orientale	Uele	Orientale	Haut-Zaïre		Orientale	Haut-Uele
Ituri	Orientale	Stanleyville	Orientale	Kibali-Ituri	Orientale	Haut-Zaïre		Orientale	Ituri
Stanleyville	Orientale	Stanleyville	Orientale	Haut-Congo	Orientale	Haut-Zaïre		Orientale	Tshopo
Aruwimi	Orientale	Stanleyville	Orientale	Haut-Congo	Orientale	Haut-Zaïre		Orientale	Tshopo
Maniema	Orientale	Costermansville	Kivu	Maniema	Kivu		Maniema		
Lowa	Orientale	Costermansville	Kivu	Maniema	Kivu		Maniema		
Kivu	Orientale	Costermansville	Kivu	Nord-Kivu	Kivu		Nord-Kivu		
Kivu	Orientale	Costermansville	Kivu	Kivu-Central	Kivu		Sud-Kivu		

== See also ==
- History of the administrative divisions of the Democratic Republic of the Congo (in French)
- List of provincial governors of the Democratic Republic of the Congo
- Lists of provincial governors of the Democratic Republic of the Congo
- List of provinces of the Democratic Republic of the Congo by Human Development Index
- Districts of the Democratic Republic of the Congo
- Districts of the Belgian Congo
- Territories of the Democratic Republic of the Congo
- ISO 3166-2:CD

== Bibliography ==
- Gwillim Law (1999). "Democratic Republic of the Congo". Administrative Subdivisions of Countries: A Comprehensive World Reference, 1900 through 1998. US: McFarland & Company. pp. 92–94. ISBN 0786407298.
- Jean-Claude Bruneau [in French] (2009). "Les nouvelles provinces de la République Démocratique du Congo: construction territoriale et ethnicités". L'Espace politique (in French). 7 (7). doi:10.4000/espacepolitique.1296 – via Revues.org.
- Kahombo, Balingene (2019). "Chapter 7 : Regionalism under the Congolese Constitution of 18 February 2006". Decentralization and Constitutionalism in Africa. Oxford University Press. pp. 183–211. ISBN 9780192585035.
- Leibholz, Gerhard, ed. (1966). "Constitutionalism and Constitutions in the Congo". Jahrbuch des Offentlichen Rechts der Gegenwart. Neue Folge. Vol. 15. Mohr Siebeck. ISBN 9783166159522.
- Lemarchand, René (1964). Political Awakening in the Belgian Congo. University of California Press.
- Willame, Jean-Claude (1972). Patrimonialism and Political Change in the Congo. Stanford: Stanford University Press. ISBN 978-0-8047-0793-0.
