= Kamiji Territory =

Kamiji
- Territory
- Interactive map of Kamiji
- Country: DR Congo
- Province: Lomami
- Time zone: UTC+2 (CAT)

Kamiji is a territory in Lomami province of the Democratic Republic of the Congo.

The territory is divided into two sectors, Kamiji and Luekeshi, which together contain nine groupings.
