= Lubefu Territory =

Lubefu
- Territory
- Interactive map of Lubefu
- Country: DR Congo
- Province: Sankuru

Area
  - Total: 12,229 km^{2} (4,722 sq mi)

Population (2020)
  - Total: 927,312
  - Density: 75.829/km^{2} (196.40/sq mi)
- Time zone: UTC+2 (CAT)

Lubefu is a territory in Sankuru province of the Democratic Republic of the Congo.
