= Sankuru =

Province of the Democratic Republic of the Congo

Sankuru Province du Sankuru (French)
- Province
- Flag

- Coordinates: 3°31′S 23°36′E
- Country: DR Congo
- Created: 2015
- Named for: Sankuru River
- Capital: Lusambo

Government
  - Governor: Victor Kitenge

Area
  - Total: 105,000 km^{2} (41,000 sq mi)

Population (2020 est.)
  - Total: 2,593,400
  - Density: 24.7/km^{2} (64.0/sq mi)

Ethnic groups
  - Native: Anamongo • Bakuba • Batetela • Basongye • Baluba • Batwa
- Time zone: UTC+2 (CAT)
- License Plate Code: (Democratic Republic of the Congo) CGO / 21
- Official language: French
- National language: Tshiluba, Lingala

Sankuru is one of the 21 provinces of the Democratic Republic of the Congo created in the 2015 repartitioning. Sankuru, Kasaï-Oriental, and Lomami provinces are the result of the dismemberment of the former Kasaï-Oriental province. Sankuru was formed from the Sankuru District whose town of Lusambo was elevated to capital city of the new province.

As of 2020, its population was estimated to be 2,593,400.

== Administration ==
While Sankuru's territories are governed by Territorial Administrators and his Deputy, including various Counselors, cities in Sankuru are governed by Mayors. Townships or collectivities have always Mayors with Council and villages are mainly governed by traditional Kingdoms according to succession legacy.

Sankuru is divided in to six territories and one independently administered city.

Administrative division	Type	Map
Lusambo	City	Lusambo
Katako-Kombe	Territory	Katako-Kombe
Kole	Territory	Kole
Lodja	Territory	Lodja
Lomela	Territory	Lomela
Lubefu	Territory	Lubefu
Lusambo	Territory	Lusambo

== History ==
Sankuru was administered as a province from 1962 to 1966. However, from 1966 to 2015, Sankuru was administered as a district as part of the Kasaï-Oriental province.

== Geography ==
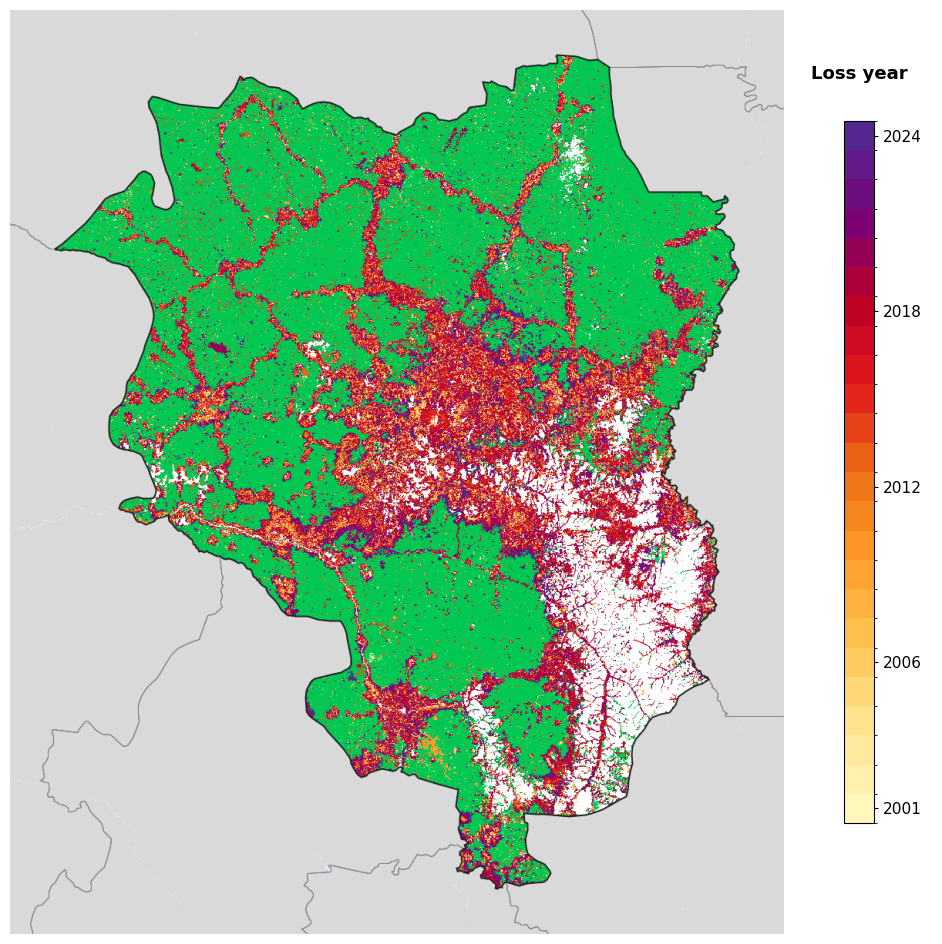
Tree-cover loss year in Sankuru, 2001-2024, from the Global Forest Change dataset.

The major geographical features are Sankuru River, Lomami River, Lubefu River and Lukenie River. There are typically three natural environments in the province: forest, savanna and bush. There are numerous mountains, valleys, and striking natural obstacles. This province has some of the richest Congolese fauna with its various species of animal including from lions, zebras, antelope, kudu, hippopotami, various species of tropical snakes, crocodiles, turtles, various species of monkeys, an array of fish species, various birds, and chimpanzees. Sankuru has very rich biodiversity.

== Economy ==
Sankuru is mainly an agricultural and farming region. Staple crops are rice, banana, pineapple, potatoes, sugar cane, coffee, sorghum, cassavas, corns and various local agricultural produce. Due to the lack of energy, Sankuru's industry is poorly developed and limited to traditional wood production, fishing and construction brick factories for local consumption and agricultural freights transportation. It's important to mention that Sankuru province has significant airlifting, waterways and routes transportation potentialities that need to be fully developed.

The lack of developed roads, electricity, clean water and viable transportation infrastructure is significantly challenging Sankuru's development. The economy is essentially focused on imported trading goods and freights moving due to the lack of developed roads, electricity, clean water and viable transportation infrastructure that significantly challenge local people.

Sankuru has rich mineral ground: diamond, gold, mercury, iron, cassiterite as well as various other mineral resources. To an important extent, the province depends on imports of primary supplies from large Congolese cities such as Kinshasa, Mbuji Mayi, Lubumbashi, Kindu and recently from Goma.

== People ==
Former prime Minister Patrice Emery Lumumba and musicians such as Papa Wemba (Shungu Wembadio Pene Kekumba), Koffi Olomide, and Franco Luambo Makiadi (Lokanga La Ndju Pene) are from Sankuru Province. The first Congolese Army General, Victor Lundula, General Otshudi and General Francois Olenga are also all from Sankuru.

== Education ==
Sankuru's primary and secondary schools are mainly organised by the Catholic, Protestant or Methodist and the Kimbanguist Churches. However, The Congolese Government also organises public schools via its Education Department. From around 2010, the province of Sankuru has recently welcomed many newly families and private individuals owned Elementary and High Schools.

Sankuru have several universities: Patrice Emery Lumumba University with a Campus in Lodja and Tshume-Ste-Marie, Saint Anne University with a campus in Tshumbe-Ste-Marie and Lusambo, several Colleges and University in Lumumbaville.

== See also ==
- Kasai region
