= Subdivisions of the Democratic Republic of the Congo =

Territorial organization of the DR Congo

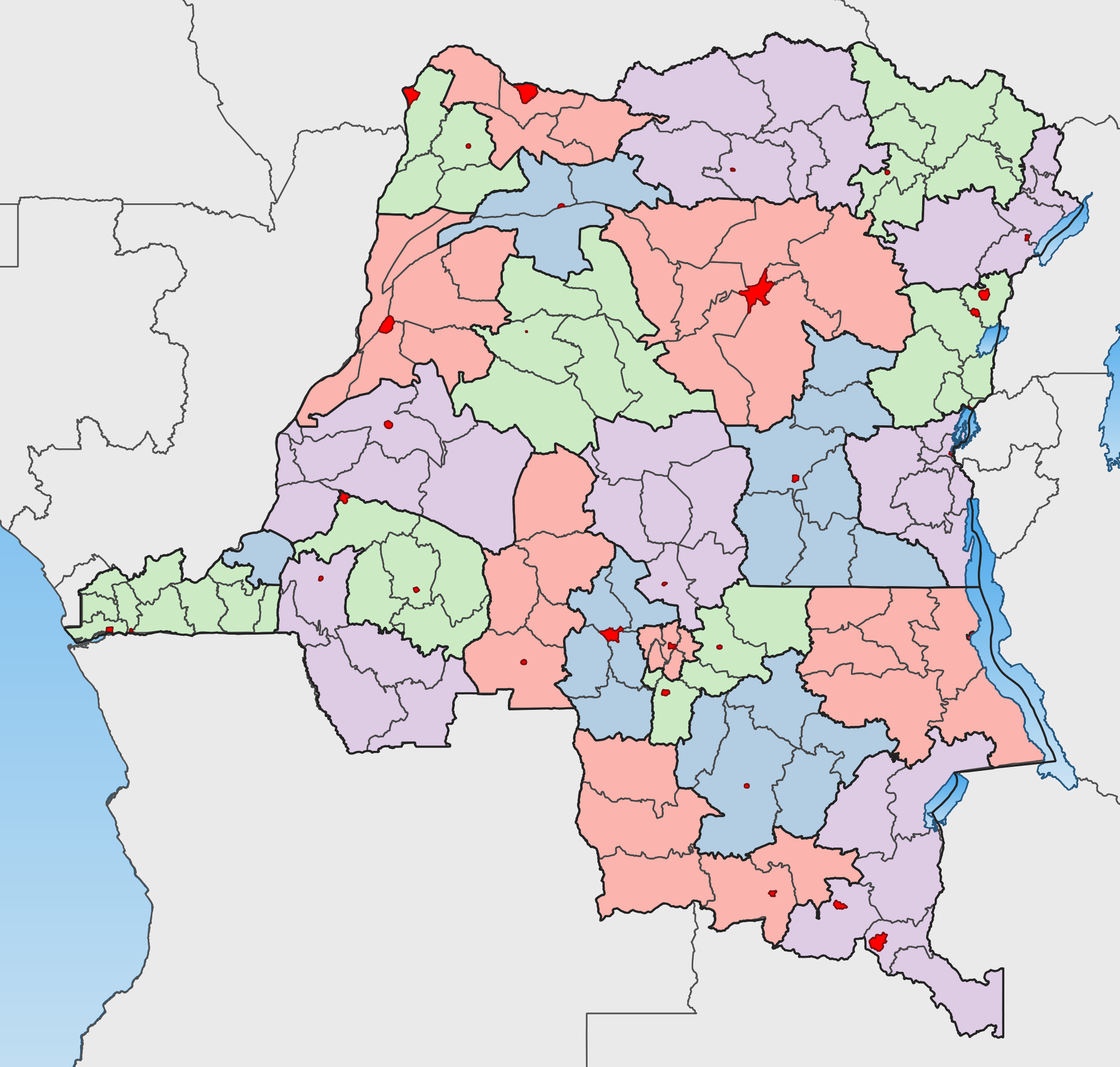
DR Congo provinces, territories, and cities (2018).

The Third Republic of the Democratic Republic of the Congo is a unitary state with a five-level hierarchy of types of administrative division. There are nine different types of country subdivision in a new hierarchy with no new types but with two from the previous one abolished.

Under the Third Republic, established in 2006, the number of provinces has gone from ten to twenty-five. By fits and starts the number of towns that have been, or are in the process of being, upgraded to cities has also increased greatly.

Reforms to devolve powers to the provinces were completed in 2006, but devolution to more local levels have again been delayed when elections scheduled for 2019 were not held. Traditional authority continues to play a significant role in governance with traditional leaders leading many of the subdivisions at the lower levels.

== History of decentralization ==
According to Christian Mulemndeko Namegabe of the Institut Supérieur de Développement Rural de Bukavu (ISDR-Bukavu), the territorial administration in the Democratic Republic of the Congo has gone through six main periods since independence. Between 1960 and 1966, the country experimented with federalism. This was followed by a period of strong centralization from 1966 to 1977, when power was mainly held by the central government. From 1977 to 1982, the government began making changes to support decentralization. However, between 1982 and 1990, decentralization took place under a one-party system. Then, from 1990 to 1997, it continued as the country moved toward multiparty politics. Since 1997, territorial administration has become more divided because of foreign military forces and rebel groups governing some areas. Mulemndeko points out that the Constitution adopted on 18 February 2006 included plans for administrative decentralization. Even so, the plan required laws to explain how it should be carried out, and it has still not been put into effect.

=== Under the first republic ===
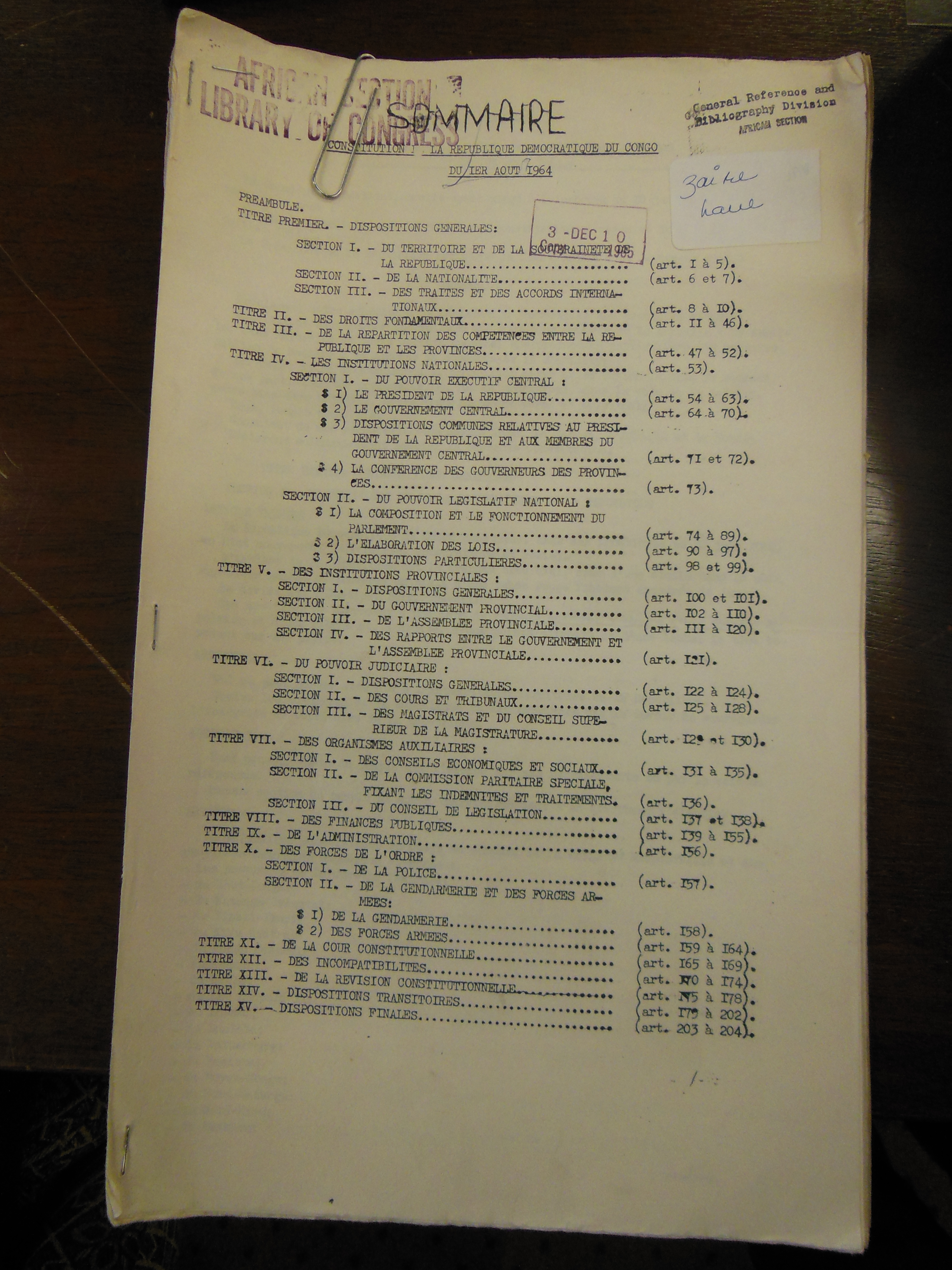
1964 Constitution of the Democratic Republic of the Congo

During the First Republic, the country faced many problems within its institutions, and, as a result, provincial matters were often managed separately, with little coordination at the national level. Efforts to restore state authority nationwide led to greater centralization of power. North Katanga was established under the law of 27 April 1962, followed by 15 additional provinces on 14 August 1962. In 1963, five more provinces were established: Middle Congo (Moyen Congo), Upper Congo (Haut-Congo), Central Kivu, Lualaba, and Eastern Katanga (Katanga Oriental). The legal status of Léopoldville was established on 10 October 1962.

=== Under the second republic ===
==== Ordinance-Law No. 82/006 of 25 February 1982 and its rationale ====
Before 1982, decentralization remained incomplete. Its implementation was selective, benefiting only a limited number of territorial entities. Other entities remained under centralized control, with varying degrees of administrative deconcentration. Against this backdrop, the MPR Central Committee, at its second ordinary session (March–June 1981), resolved to revive the decentralization program.

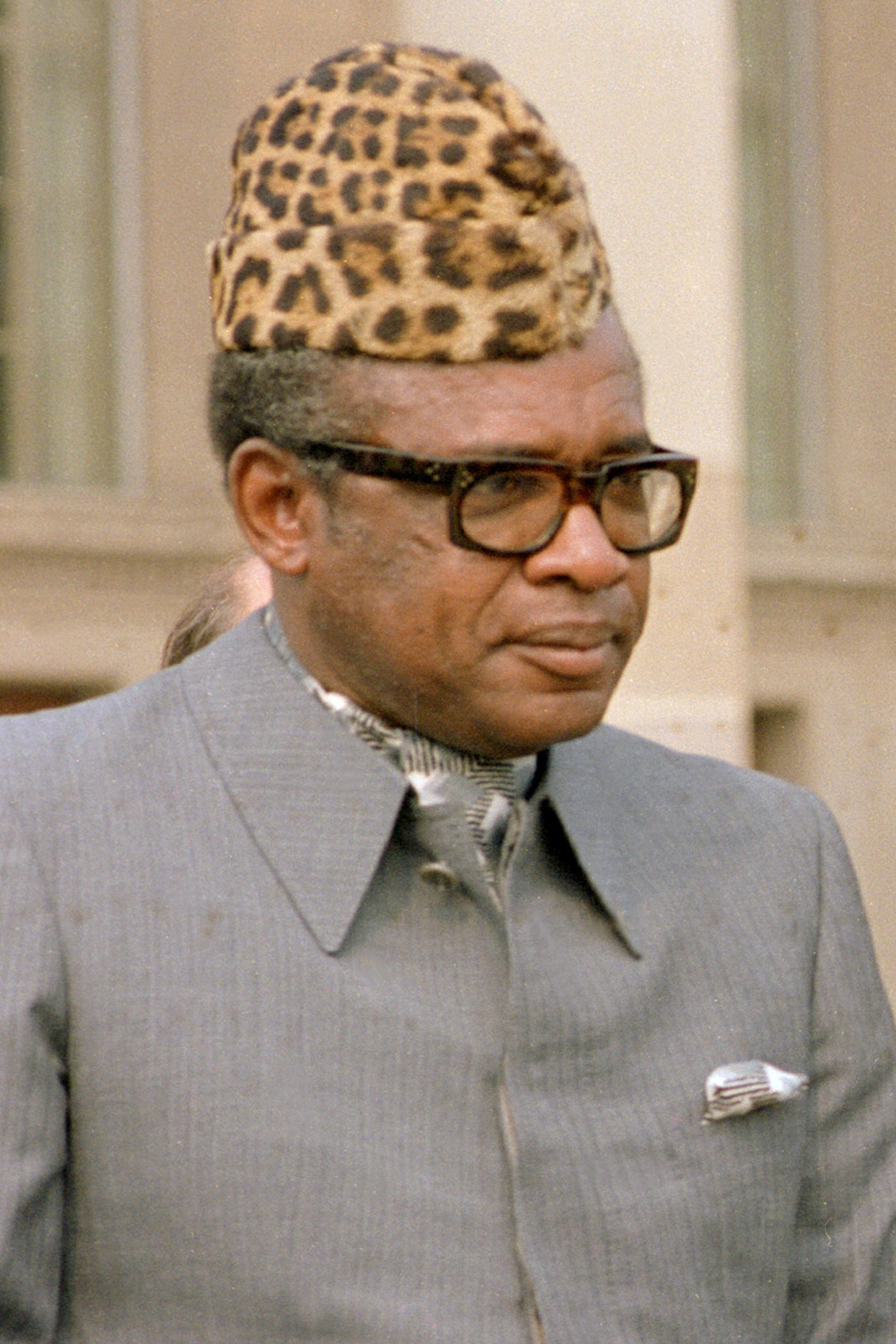
Mobutu Sese Seko sporting a typical abacost in 1983

Known as the Vunalawe Law (Loi Vunalawe), Law No. 82/006 of 25 February 1982 was based on four speeches by President Mobutu Sese Seko concerning the revolution, delivered on 1 July 1977, 25 July 1987, 19 November 1980, and 26 March 1981. According to Mulemndeko, two considerations were central to the rationale for decentralization. First, Mobutu argued that decentralization had initially been necessary to restore state authority, maintain peace, promote national cohesion, and preserve territorial integrity. However, he also warned that keeping too much power at the central level for too long could weaken the country's political, administrative, and economic systems. Second, he noticed that fewer people were taking part in party activities and that public opinion was not receiving enough attention.

The 1982 reform was therefore a major step in the history of territorial decentralization, as it recognized that regions, cities, and local communities had their own needs and interests, which had to be considered alongside the duties of the central government. As a result, the law set up local bodies to take care of these interests.

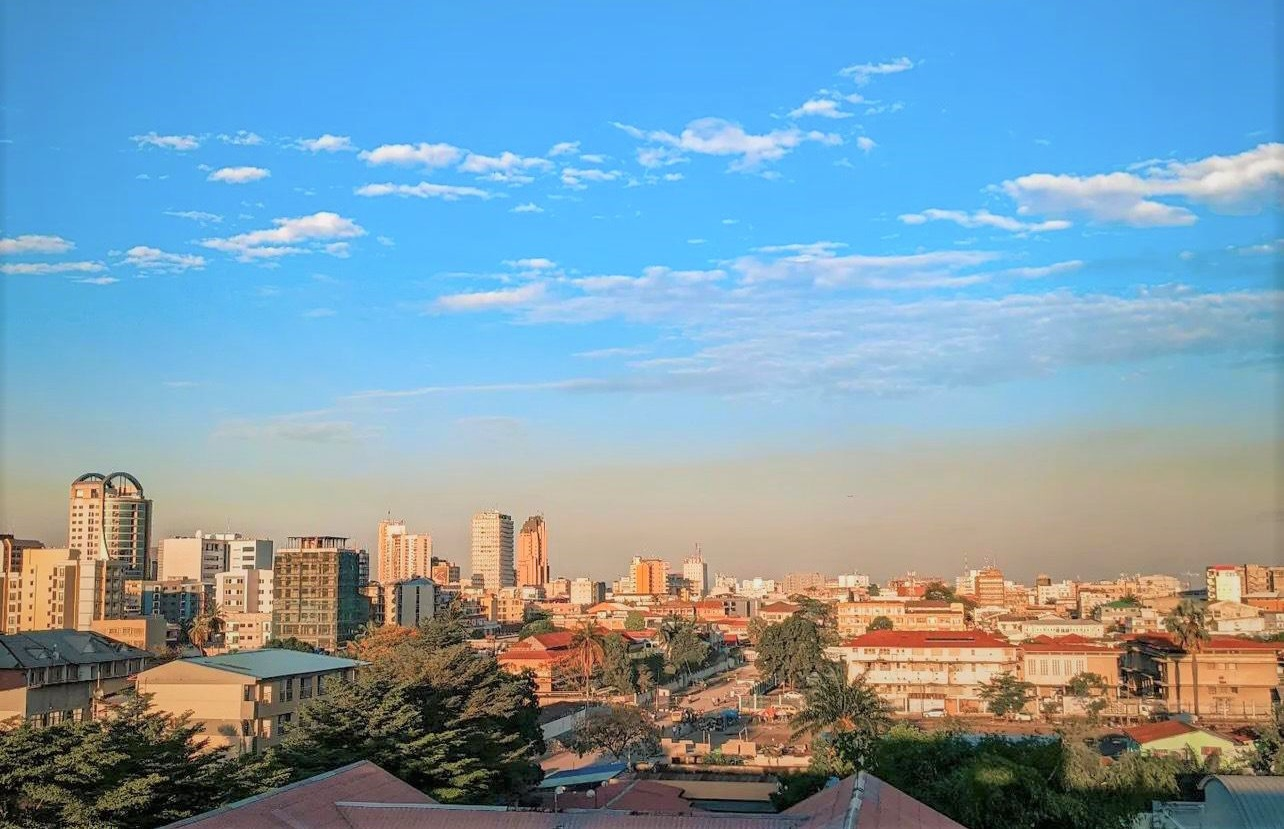
View over Gombe, Kinshasa

Earlier laws mainly focused on how the state and its administrative areas were organized. In contrast, Ordinance-Law No. 80-006 of 25 February 1982 introduced territorial decentralization in both urban and rural areas to bring party members closer to the administration so that development in their entities could be better planned. The law gave each decentralized territorial entity (entité territoriale décentralisée, or ETD) general authority over its local affairs. The law also set out the duties that local entities could manage in areas such as administration, the economy, social affairs, and culture. At the same time, it identified the responsibilities that remained with the central government. This helped divide public duties between the state and its local entities. To make this system work, each level had a body responsible for discussing and deciding on local issues. Each region and the city of Kinshasa had a regional assembly, while other decentralized entities had councils. These bodies also checked the work of the regional and local executive leaders to ensure that they managed their responsibilities properly.

Each ETD had an executive body responsible for carrying out decisions and managing its daily activities. The law gave these duties to bodies that already represented the central government in different regions. Instead of creating new bodies, the law gave the existing ones an additional role. This meant that they had two responsibilities at the same time, and, as a result, the regional governor (gouverneur de la région), zone commissioner (commissaire de zone), and chief of the collectivité (chef de collectivité) acted as representatives of the central government and as leaders of their respective ETDs.

Although decentralization gave local entities more power, the Republic of Zaire remained a unitary state, and therefore, national unity and respect for the law still had to be maintained. To achieve this, the law gave the central government the power to supervise bodies at all levels of the country's territory. Depending on the situation, this supervision could be carried out through hierarchical control, administrative supervision (tutelle), or the courts. Hierarchical control involved supervision by higher authorities over lower ones. Administrative supervision allowed the central government to monitor ETD bodies and the decisions they made. Members of the public had the right to challenge decisions made by administrative authorities before the courts responsible for handling such cases.

==== Changes introduced by the 1982 Law ====
First, the decentralization system introduced in 1982 applied to all major territorial entities in urban and rural areas. Instead of having separate laws for different areas, the law brought them together under one legal framework. This ended the two-part system inherited from colonial rule, which had remained in place since the Decree of 12 January 1923 concerning urban districts.

The second change was the creation of regional and local assemblies for the five types of ETDs, including regions, urban zones (villes zones urbaines), rural zones (zones rurales), and collectivités. These assemblies serve as deliberative bodies and provide ongoing oversight of the management of regional or local authorities.

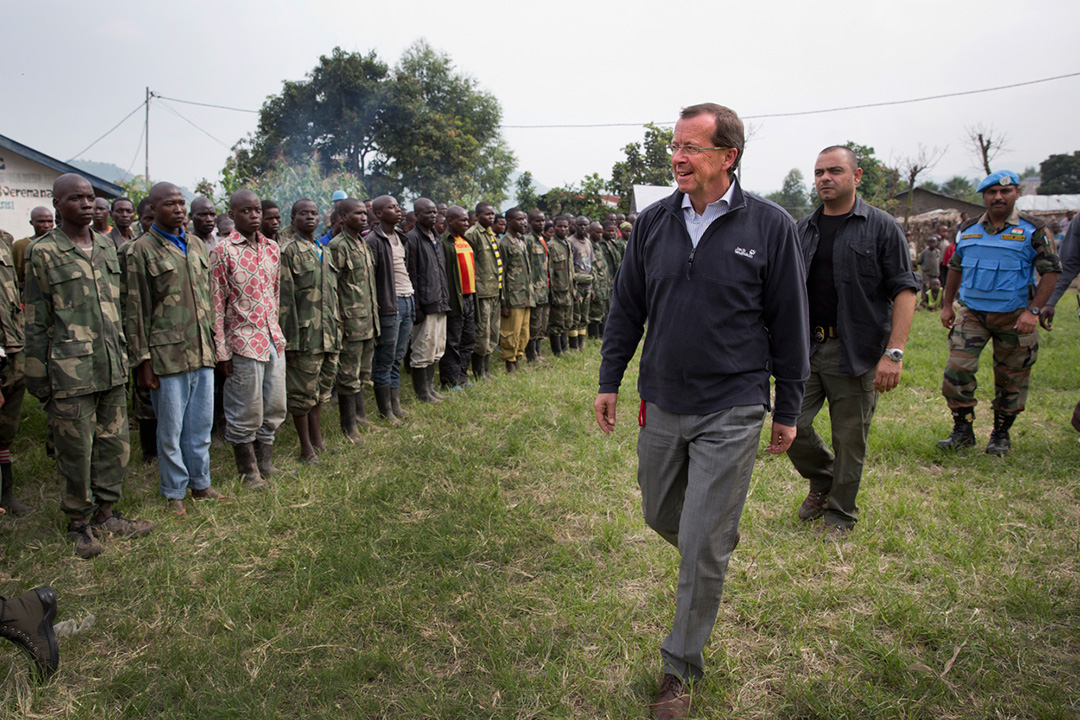
Bweremana localité

The third change was that the power to organize territorial entities was given exclusively to the president of the republic. Article 39 of the Constitution gave the president the duty of protecting the country's territorial integrity. Because of this change, the State Commissioner, also known as the Minister responsible for Territorial Administration, lost the power to organize basic territorial entities such as collectivités, towns (cités), quartiers (quarters), groupings (groupements), and localities (localités).

The fourth change was the introduction of territorial entities that were different from those under the previous law, which followed the reform of 10 April 1967. The 1982 law introduced new definitions for cities, groupings, quarters, and localities, changing how these entities were understood and organized.

A city was defined as a regional capital or any important urban entity that was given city status by the president of the republic through an official order. However, this decision had to follow clear legal conditions. The law also gave a new meaning to the cité. It referred either to the administrative center of a subregion or rural zone, or to an urban settlement with at least 15,000 people and a large number of workers.

The groupement was brought back into the territorial system as an administrative subdivision of the collectivité. It was defined as a traditional community organized according to its customs and led by a customary chief who had been recognized and officially appointed by the state. The groupement thus uniformly replaced the locality in its former role as an administrative subdivision of the collectivité.

The locality was not removed from the territorial system, but became an administrative subdivision of the groupement. It referred to a "traditional community organized according to custom or local practices, whose unity and internal cohesion are based primarily on ties of clan or kinship solidarity". The quartier was brought back as an administrative subdivision of an urban zone or cité. This meant that localities could no longer serve as administrative subdivisions of urban zones in urban settlements.

The 1982 law introduced three main technical changes:

Changes	Explanation
Presentation of the legal provisions	The law, according to Mulemndeko, made the new system easier to understand by explaining the structure and legal rules of each territorial entity, from the region down to the locality. Mulemndeko noted that this was an important improvement in the way laws were written because "any serious territorial reform should seek clarity by precisely defining its basic concepts".
Dividing duties between the central government and ETDs	The law introduced a clearer division of duties between the central government, represented by the Executive Council, and the ETDs. These local entities were considered important for economic growth, so they received the powers and resources needed to manage their responsibilities. The law also gave each entity general control over its local affairs. It also explained which duties belonged to the central government and which were to be handled by the ETDs in each area.
One legal system for territorial administration	Before 1982, territorial administration was governed by two separate systems, which often led to unequal treatment of urban and rural areas. However, the 1982 law ended this arrangement by introducing one legal system for both urban and rural areas. This created a more consistent and equal way of organizing territorial administration.

=== During the transition (1990–2006) ===
The DRC experienced a political transition marked by several crises, which led to numerous attempts at resolving them and to the drafting of constitutional texts and legislation on decentralization. These included Law No. 95-005 of 20 December 1995, Decree-Law No. 031 of 8 October 1997, and Decree-Law No. 081 of 2 July 1998.

==== Law No. 95-005 of 20 December 1995 ====
Law No. 95-005 of 20 December 1995, known as the Malumba Ngula Law, was adopted under the Transitional Constitutional Act (Acte Constitutionnel de la Transition; ACT) of 9 April 1994. Article 103 of the ACT called for a special law on decentralization and identified the different bodies that would manage regional and local affairs. These bodies included regional councils and executive committees, urban councils and executive committees, communal or territorial executive committees, collectivité councils, and collectivité executive committees.

During this period, the law recognized five types of ETDs: regions, cities, communes, territories, and collectivités. The ACT restored the rule that lawmakers could set regional boundaries without creating new regions or changing existing names. Article 2 clearly listed the 10 regions that made up the Republic of Zaire, and each region had its own legal status. As a result, the authority to decide on the names and list of regions was reserved for the body responsible for establishing the constitution.

Law No. 95-005 of 20 December 1995 brought several changes to the way decentralized administrative entities (entités administratives décentralisés; EADs) were organized and managed. Their decision-making bodies included representatives from the two political groups recognized by Article 78 of the ACT and established under the founding act of 16 June 1994. These bodies were responsible for reviewing and approving the executive committees' action plans before implementation. After approval, they also checked whether the plans were being carried out as expected.

The law also changed how executive committees made decisions by introducing a system in which members shared responsibility for managing public affairs. At the same time, it removed subregions from their supervisory role over EADs, territories, cités, groupements, and villages.

The law allowed lower administrative levels to collect state revenue, while higher levels were responsible for transferring the amounts owed to them. Most officials who had been appointed under laws passed before the ACT continued to manage daily affairs until their replacements took office. However, this arrangement did not apply to customary authorities in chiefdom collectivités (collectivités-chefferies), groupements, and villages. The law replaced the term "locality" with "village".

==== Decree-Law No. 031 of 8 October 1997 ====
According to Mulemndeko, Decree-Law No. 031 of 8 October 1997 did not introduce any major changes to territorial administration. Instead, it mainly changed the names of administrative entities and authorities. The decree-law brought back the terms used before January 1973, such as provinces, districts, territories, sectors, cities, and communes. These names replaced the terms that had been used before, including subregions, rural zones, urban zones, and collectivités.

==== Decree-Law No. 081 of 2 July 1998 ====
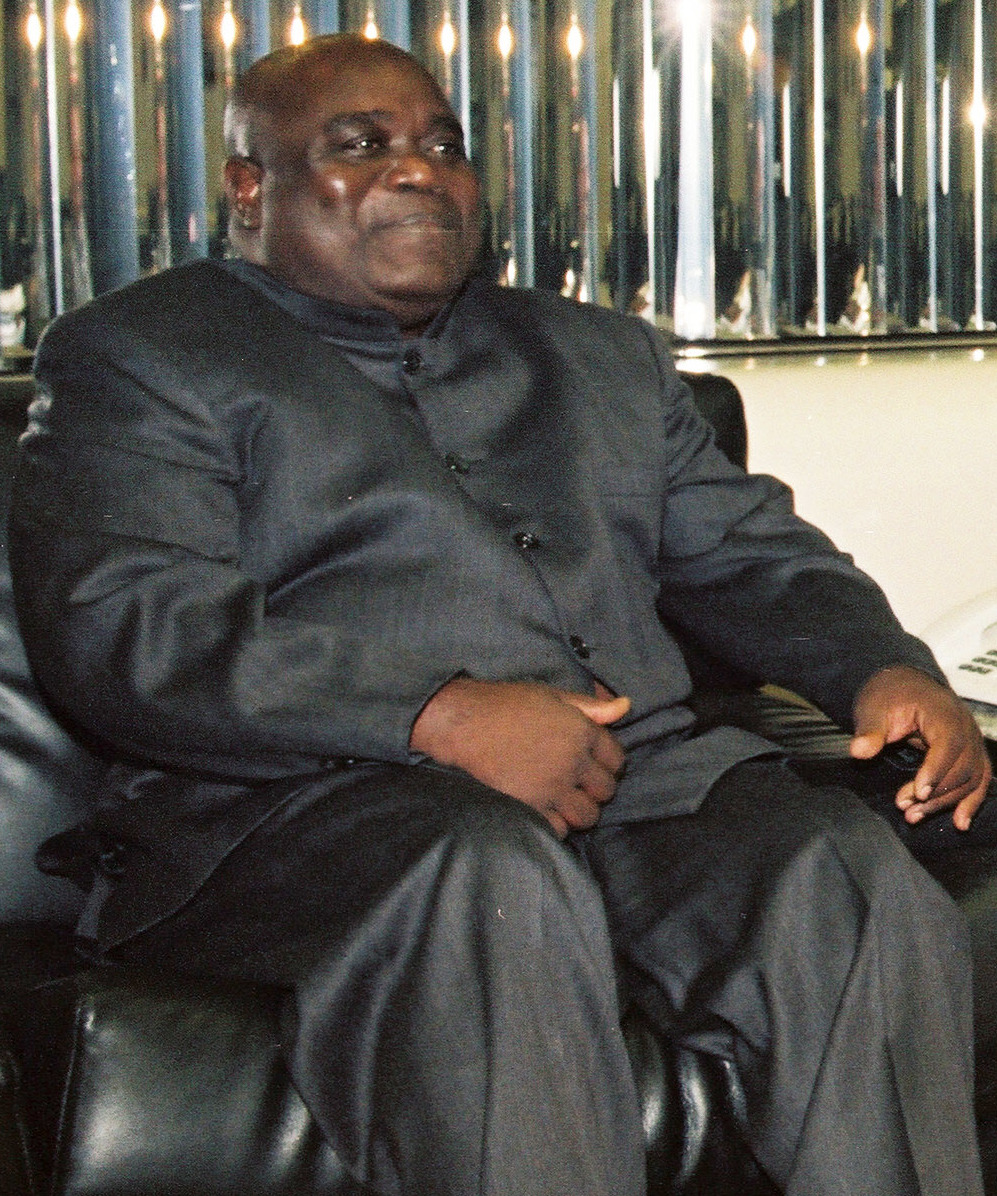
Laurent-Désiré Kabila, President of the Democratic Republic of the Congo following the AFDL takeover in May 1997.

Decree-Law No. 081 of 2 July 1998 was adopted after the Alliance of Democratic Forces for the Liberation of Congo (AFDL) took power on 17 May 1997. After taking power, the new authorities issued a statement called the "Declaration of the Assumption of Power". In this statement, they announced the suspension of all existing acts considered "pseudo-constitutional", along with the institutions established under them.

Decree-Law No. 081 of 2 July 1998 brought major changes to the way territorial entities were managed. It weakened the progress made toward democracy by abolishing the decision-making bodies of decentralized territorial entities. In their place, it created advisory councils that worked with provincial, urban, and local executive authorities. These included provincial, urban, and territorial advisory councils, as well as communal councils.

The number of ETDs was reduced. The law recognized only provinces, the city of Kinshasa, cities, territories, and communes located in Kinshasa as ETDs. Consequently, communes elsewhere in the country, chiefdoms, and sectors became mere administrative subdivisions rather than decentralized entities. The district, which had been called a "subregion" under the 1982 law, was brought back into the administrative system. Its role was to coordinate, supervise, and inspect basic territorial entities. The law also simplified the names "chiefdom collectivité" and "sector collectivité" to "chiefdom" and "sector". These two types of entities also lost their legal personality, meaning they were no longer recognized as separate legal bodies.

The law gave several officials the power to represent the central government and make decisions within their areas of responsibility. These officials included provincial governors, the governor of Kinshasa, city mayors, territorial administrators, commune mayors (bourgmestre), sector chiefs, and chiefdom chiefs. However, the law created an inconsistency because commune mayors outside Kinshasa, sector chiefs, and chiefdom chiefs were still treated as local authorities even though the entities they led were not recognized as decentralized administrative entities.

The law also assigned budget management duties to specific deputy officials. These were the vice-governor responsible for economic and financial affairs, deputy city mayors, assistant territorial administrators, and deputy mayors of communes in Kinshasa. They were responsible for managing the budget funds allocated to their respective ETDs.

=== Under the third republic ===
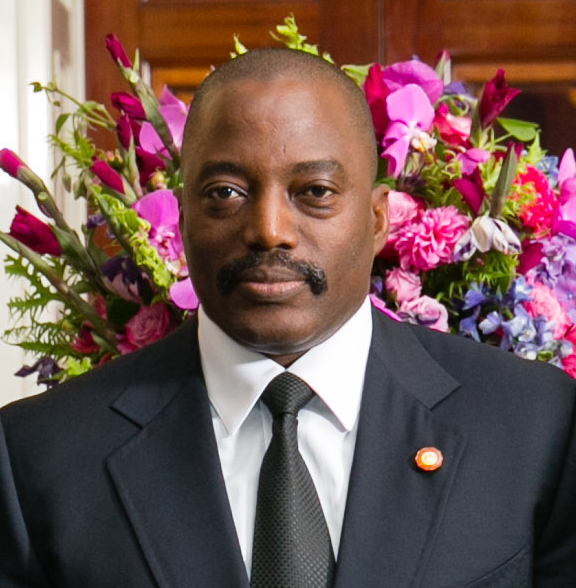
Joseph Kabila, who led the DRC during the implementation of the 2006 Constitution and the decentralization reforms.

The Constitution adopted on 18 February 2006 brought decentralization back into the political system of the DRC. Under this Constitution, the country is organized as a regionalized state, where powers are divided between the national government and the provinces. There are three types of powers: those reserved for the central government, those shared by the central government and the provinces, and those that belong only to the provinces.

Because of this division, national lawmakers can pass laws only on matters under the central government's exclusive authority or on matters shared with the provinces. For shared matters, any provincial edict incompatible with national laws and their implementing regulations is void and automatically repealed. However, the national Parliament, made up of the National Assembly and the Senate, may give some of its law-making powers to a provincial assembly. This allows the provincial assembly to pass laws on certain matters that normally fall under the central government's exclusive authority. Such laws apply only within the province that adopts them.

The Constitution also requires a clear division between the power to make laws and the power to issue regulations. The law mentioned in Article 3, paragraph 4, and Article 123, point 1, of the Constitution is expected to explain more clearly the limits of the provincial assembly's law-making powers. The provincial government is responsible for handling regulatory matters that are not assigned elsewhere. The Constitutional Court mainly deals with disagreements over powers between the executive and legislative branches, as well as disputes between the central government and the provinces. Administrative courts may also handle disputes between provincial executive and legislative bodies, especially when an authority is accused of acting beyond its legal powers.

The courts, the army, and the police remain under the control of the central government, but they serve the whole country. Mulemndeko notes that this shows that the DRC remains one united state, even though power is shared between the central government and the provinces. Therefore, the country has a regionalized system, but it is not the same as a traditional decentralized unitary state.

According to Article 3 of the Constitution, the DRC has two main types of territorial organization. The first includes the provinces and the city of Kinshasa, which has the same status as a province. The second includes decentralized territorial entities (entités territoriales décentralisées; EADs), which are identified by the Constitution as cities, communes, sectors, and chiefdoms. These EADs have the freedom to manage their own affairs and control their economic, human, financial, and technical resources.

This freedom is known as self-administration, which means that EADs are managed by councils or other elected bodies that can make local rules and sign contracts within the limits of the law. The state also provides financial resources to these entities through legal arrangements.

Before taking up their duties, EAD leaders must be officially installed by the governor of the province or the governor of Kinshasa, depending on where they serve. Their powers, however, are different from those of provinces in a federal or regionalized state. The powers of EADs are determined by lawmakers, who decide how responsibilities are shared between the state and local entities. Self-administration prevents one EAD from supervising another. This rule applies even when local entities share services or have other working relationships.

== Territorial organization ==
The Constitution divides the country into the capital city of Kinshasa and 25 provinces. It also gives the capital the status of a province. The hierarchy of types of administrative division in the province, as set down in other organic law, is as follows:
(French names in italics.)

- Province
  - Territory (territoire)
    - Sector or Chiefdom (secteur or chefferie)
      - Grouping (groupement)
        - Village
    - Commune
      - Quarter (quartier)
        - ⋯
      - Embedded Grouping (groupement incorporé)
        - Village
  - City (ville)
    - Commune
      - Quarter (quartier)
        - ⋯
      - Embedded Grouping (groupement incorporé)
        - Village

A province is divided into cities and territories. Cities are divided into communes, and communes into quartiers. Territories, in turn, are divided into communes, sectors, or chiefdoms. Each sector or chiefdom is divided into groupements, which are then divided into villages. Territories, groupements, and villages are deconcentrated territorial entities and have no legal personality. Cities, communes, sectors, and chiefdoms, however, are decentralized territorial entities with legal personality and the freedom to manage their staff and their economic, financial, and technical resources.

The law defines these decentralized entities in a way that shows their intended role in supporting local development:

Entity	Description
City	A provincial capital or a settlement of at least 100,000 people with public facilities and economic and social infrastructure. Its status is granted by a decree of the Prime Minister. It is governed by a city council, which discusses and makes decisions, and a city executive council, which carries them out.
Commune	A territorial capital, an administrative division of a city, or a settlement of at least 20,000 people granted this status by a decree of the Prime Minister. It has a communal council that makes decisions and a communal executive council that carries them out.
Sector and chiefdom	Both are divisions of a territory. A sector brings together different communities, while a chiefdom consists of communities with a shared background. A sector chief is elected and officially installed by the public authorities. A chiefdom chief, by contrast, is chosen according to custom before being officially recognized and installed by those authorities. Each has a sector or chiefdom council and a sector or chiefdom executive board.

=== Remarks ===
- Kinshasa has the status of a province, but the subdivisions of a city. It is often referred to as a city-province and in many contexts is counted as the 26th province.
- The district and the cité, previously subdivisions of a province and a territory respectively, have been abolished. The cité has been replaced by the commune.
- In the Congo a commune can now be an urban subdivision of a city, a country town, or in some cases a mostly-rural area attached to a city.
- An older term, "collectivity" (French: collectivité), dating to the Belgian colonial era, sometimes denotes for convenience a sector or a chiefdom.
- Some collectivités do not form a contiguous area of land but are made up instead of more than one unconnected area.
- The grouping (of villages) and, at a higher level, the chiefdom are subdivisions led by customary leaders of traditional polities.
- An embedded grouping is a grouping that has been absorbed into a commune.
- A quarter has divisions, but these are not set down by organic law.
- There are uninhabited areas that are not part of any subdivision below a territory.

== New subdivisions ==
=== New provinces ===
The Constitution, as before, divides the country into the city of Kinshasa and the provinces; however, it increased the number of provinces from ten to twenty-five. This was put into effect in 2015, when the six largest provinces were split into twenty-one new provinces. Together with the four unsplit provinces—Bas-Congo (renamed Kongo Central), Maniema, Nord-Kivu, and Sud-Kivu—they make up the twenty-five provinces listed in Article 2 of the Constitution.

Under the old organization the six former provinces were divided into districts and cities. The districts were further divided into territories. Each new province was created from the territories of one or two districts, adding any enclosed cities and—if necessary—making the new capital a city. The following table gives the complete details. So for instance, Lommami province resulted from the split of the former Kasaï-Oriental province; created from the territories of the former Kabinda district, the city of Mwene-Ditu, and by making the town of Kabinda the capital city.

Table 1. 2015 Repartioning by district
Former province →	Subdivisions of former province		+ New city	= New province
Former province →	District(s)	City(ies)	+ New city	= New province
Bandundu	Kwango		Kenge	Kwango
Bandundu	Kwilu	Bandundu, Kikwit		Kwilu
Bandundu	Mai-Ndombe, Plateaux		Inongo	Mai-Ndombe
Équateur	Équateur	Mbandaka		Équateur
Équateur	Mongala		Lisala	Mongala
Équateur	Nord-Ubangi	Gbadolite		Nord-Ubangi
Équateur	Sud-Ubangi	Zongo	Gemena	Sud-Ubangi
Équateur	Tshuapa		Boende	Tshuapa
Kasaï-Occidental	Kasaï	Tshikapa		Kasaï
Kasaï-Occidental	Lulua	Kananga		Kasaï-Central
Kasaï-Oriental	Tshilenge	Mbuji-Mayi		Kasaï-Oriental
Kasaï-Oriental	Kabinda	Mwene-Ditu	Kabinda	Lomami
Kasaï-Oriental	Sankuru		Lusambo	Sankuru
Katanga	Haut-Katanga	Likasi, Lubumbashi		Haut-Katanga
Katanga	Haut-Lomami		Kamina	Haut-Lomami
Katanga	Lualaba, Kolwezi^{†}			Lualaba
Katanga	Tanganyika		Kalemie	Tanganyika
Orientale	Bas-Uélé		Buta	Bas-Uélé
Orientale	Haut-Uélé		Isiro	Haut-Uélé
Orientale	Ituri		Bunia	Ituri
Orientale	Tshopo	Kisangani		Tshopo
† Kolwezi was a hybrid city/district made up of two communes and two territories. The territories were split off and the rest became the provincial capital.

=== New cities and communes ===
In June 2013 a batch of prime ministerial decrees was issued giving city and commune status to, and setting the boundaries for, a large number of former cités and other populated places. According to the government's 2014 statistical yearbook the Congo would go from 21 cities and 227 cités in 2008 to 99 cities and 289 territorial communes in the reorganization. However, in July 2015 the implementation of many of the decrees' articles were suspended following the failure in the National Assembly of an electoral bill based on the boundaries in the decrees.

In order to pass a modified bill allocating seats for upcoming local elections, it was decided to suspend those articles that were contentious and to revert the affected communities to their 2006 administrative configurations. The articles granting city status to new provincial capitals—Boende, Bunia, Buta, Gemena, Inongo, Isiro, Kabinda, Kalemie, Kamina, Kenge, Lisala, and Lusambo—were not suspended and neither were those granting commune status to the administrative centers of the territories.

Ultimately the planned for local elections never occurred, but the suspensions were not lifted until mid-2018 just months before the general election. The National Alliance of Traditional Authorities of the Congo protested this reinstatement as diminishing traditional authority and as a threat to national security. In addition to reinstating the articles the government decided that disputes over boundaries would be resolved by an ad hoc committee and that the setting up of cities and communes would be prioritized with 18 cities in the initial phase.

In 2019 mayors for the new cities of Uvira, Baraka, Kamituga, and Kasumbalesa were appointed. The setting up of a city administration and those of its subdivisions can take years given the lack of local resources. For instance the town of Buta gained city status when it became a provincial capital in 2015, had its first mayor appointed in 2018, and by June 2019 its four communes were still not operational.

== Number of subdivisions ==
Table 2. 2018 Subdivision count by administrative level
Level	Total	Breakdown
1st	26	25 provinces + Kinshasa
2nd	177	145 territories + 33 cities − Kinshasa
3rd	1,045	470 sectors + 264 chiefdoms + 311 communes
4th	8,471	6,070 groupings + 2,401 quarters
5th	> 86,270	~86,270 villages + ? quarter divisions

Table 2 is based on data compiled by the Independent National Electoral Commission (CENI) as part of organizing the election cycle of 2018. The count of cities only includes those currently represented in the national and provincial assemblies and not those that became cities after the organization of the elections. Thus, for example, the new city of Uvira is not counted as a city but as a commune in the table. This of course also effects the counts of city subdivisions such as communes and quarters.

== Governance ==
The Constitution of 2006 and ensuing organic laws brought reforms to the governance of the subdivisions which are not yet complete. Table 3 sketches the envisioned governance by subdivision type and its current status.

Table 3. Governance of subdivisions after reforms in brief
Level	Type	Leader		Deliberative body	To do (February 2023)
Level	Type	Title^{a}	Selection	Deliberative body	To do (February 2023)
1st	Province^{b}	Governor	elected by assembly	Assembly of elected and co-opted (up to 10%) members^{c}	
2nd	Territory	Territory Administrator	appointed	n/a	
2nd	City	Mayor	elected by council	Council elected by commune councils^{d}	council and leader elections (leaders are currently appointed)
3rd	Commune	Burgomaster	elected by council	Council elected by voters	council and leader elections (leaders are currently appointed)
3rd	Sector	Sector Chief	elected by council	Council elected by voters	council and leader elections (leaders are currently appointed)
3rd	Chiefdom	Chiefdom Chief	by tradition	Council elected by voters	council elections
4th	Grouping	Grouping Chief	by tradition	n/a	
4th	Quarter	Quarter Chief	appointed	n/a	
5th	Village	Village Chief	by tradition or other local practice	n/a	
Notes: a) In French top to bottom: gouverneur, administrateur de territoire (AT), maire, bourgmestre, chef de secteur, ...de chefferie, ...de groupment, ...de quartier, and ...de village. b) Includes Kinshasa. c) Co-opted members are traditional leaders selected by their peers following strict rules including term limits. d) Each Commune Council elects four members of the City Council.

=== Uncompleted devolution ===
These reforms devolved powers to the provinces and, more modestly, to the cities and the subdivisions at the third administrative level. They all were to have both an executive body with a leader and a deliberative body which was to elect the leader. The other subdivisions remained purely administrative in nature.

The Congolese voter would have a direct say in the affairs of the province by voting in a deputy to the provincial assembly which would then go on to elect the governor. The voter was also to have a say in more local affairs by voting in a councilperson to the local council which was then, except in a chiefdom, to go on to elect the local leader. If the voter lived in a provincial city they were also to have a more indirect say, again through the local council, in the composition of the city government.

Devolution to the provinces was launched with the 2006 provincial elections which elected the provincial assemblies of the eleven provinces. Similar elections for local councils have yet to occur. Thus, the effected subdivisions have no deliberative body and their leaders, as provided by law, are unelected and appointed from above. In this way a city mayor is much like a territory administrator. For now the Congolese voter does not have a say in local affairs.

Local council elections were scheduled to occur on 22 September 2019. In April of that year the League of Women Voters for the Elections met with the electoral commission and condemned the delay in starting candidate registration for the local elections. In June, the League of Voters stressed the importance of these elections and asked President Tshisekedi to intervene to get the process going. In August, a petition with two million signatures demanding that the elections be held was filed at the presidential palace. The signatures were collected within two months by the Catholic and Protestant Churches. At the end of October the outgoing electoral commission presented their final report to the National Assembly. At this time their rapporteur said that organizing the local elections required a workforce of 650,000 and the allocation of considerable funds by the government. Finally, in December President Tshisekedi declared that the elections would be held sometime in 2020. This did not happen.

However, in February 2022 the new electoral commission published a roadmap for the next election cycle that would have the local council elections occur in December 2023 along with the elections for the president, the National Assembly, and the provincial assemblies. But, when the electoral calendar was published in November 2022, the elections for sector and chiefdom council were pushed back to 11 July 2024 leaving only the commune elections to be run on 20 December 2023.

=== Traditional authority ===
Traditional leaders have a significant role in governing the subdivisions. At the first administrative level, 8% of all provincial deputies are co-opted traditional leaders. At the third and forth levels they are the leaders of 25% and 70% of the subdivisions respectively. In 2018, 64% of the electorate lived in a grouping without counting those in embedded groupings.

Traditional authority is recognized by Article 207 of the Constitution and a law defining the legal status of traditional leaders was passed in 2015. In addition to being official leaders of their administrative divisions, these leaders exercise customary authority – which can involve traditional advisory councils – in a way that is not contrary to the Constitution, the law, public order and decency. The leaders are also obligated to be apolitical.

Although selected by local structures according to custom, traditional leaders can only exercise their authority if they are officially recognized and invested by the government. Failure of the government to do so can cause great resentment. In 2013 such a dispute over the leadership of a grouping eventually led, through an escalation of conflicts in 2016, to the Kamwina Nsapu rebellion.

== Related divisions ==
=== Electoral districts ===
Table 4. Electoral districts of the 2018 election cycle
For	the Districts are		Total	
For	in Provinces	in Kinshasa	Districts	Seats
National Assembly	territories and cities	Kinshasa I-IV (city districts)^{a}	181	500
Provincial Assembly	territories and cities	communes	201	715
Commune Council	communes		311	2,323
Sector or Chiefdom Council	sectors or chiefdoms^{b}	n/a	734	7,334
Notes: a) Kinshasa I: Lukunga, II: Funa, III: Mont-Amba, IV: Tshangu. b) But seats are allocated by grouping.

Except for the four National Assembly districts in Kinshasa, all electoral districts in Table 4 are administrative divisions. The Carter Center expert mission report for the 2018 elections criticizes the use of these divisions for national and provincial elections as not meeting international standards for uniform allocation of voters per constituency. As example they contrast 27,228 voters per National Assembly seat in the city of Inongo vs. 128,699 in the territory of Lomela.

== See also ==
- Provinces of the Democratic Republic of the Congo
- Territories of the Democratic Republic of the Congo
- Cities of the Democratic Republic of the Congo
- Chiefdoms and sectors of the Democratic Republic of the Congo
- Communes of the Democratic Republic of the Congo
- Constituencies in the National Assembly
- Former districts of the Democratic Republic of the Congo

== Cited Works ==
- "Loi organique n° 08/016 du 07 octobre 2008 portant composition, organisation et fonctionnement des Entités Territoriales Décentralisées et leurs rapports avec l'Etat et les Provinces" [Organic Law No. 08/016 of 7 October 2008 on the composition, organization and functioning of the Decentralized Territorial Entities and their relations with the State and the Provinces]. LEGANET.CD (in French). Archived from the original on 21 February 2019.
- Institut National de la Statistique–RD Congo (July 2015). Annuaire statistique 2014 [2014 Statistical Yearbook] (PDF) (in French). Archived (PDF) from the original on 12 March 2019.
- Journal officiel de la République Démocratique du Congo (PDF) (in French) (Special ed.). 20 June 2013. Archived (PDF) from the original on 12 January 2020.
- "Les Décrets portant statut de nouvelles villes, cités et communes mis en veilleuse". le Phare (in French). 23 July 2015. Archived from the original on 1 October 2017.
- "RDC : l'installation des nouvelles provinces va se faire en deux phases". Radio Okapi (in French). 4 March 2015. Archived from the original on 1 September 2017.
- Matotu, T. (23 July 2015). "Le Gouvernement relance le débat au Parlement sur la répartition des sièges aux Locales" (pdf). Le Soft International (in French). No. 1325. pp. 6–7. Archived (PDF) from the original on 14 December 2015.
- "Décret n° 18/020 du 30 mai 2018" (PDF). Journal officiel de la République Démocratique du Congo (in French). 59 (13). col 13–14. 1 July 2019.
- "Arrêté Interministeriel n° 25/CAB/VPM/MININTERSEC/HMS/081/2018 & n° CAB/ME/MIN.DRI/ARN/FKT/007/2018 du 30 Mai 2018" (PDF). www.lualaba.gouv.cd (in French). Archived (PDF) from the original on 30 September 2019.
- Le Potentiel (25 July 2018). "Décentralisation : les autorités traditionnelles de la RDC en colère contre le Premier ministre". Digital Congo (in French). MMC. Archived from the original on 25 July 2018.
- Bouvier, Paule; Omasombo Tshonda, Jean (2016). "La décentralisation en panne" (PDF). In Marysse, Stefaan; Omasombo Tshonda, Jean (eds.). Conjonctures congolaises 2015. Cahiers africains (in French). Vol. 87. Paris: Éditions L'Harmattan. ISBN 978-2-343-08858-7.
- Balongelwa, Enoch (12 February 2019). "Sud-Kivu : Les maires de villes nouvellement créées reçus par le Gouverneur de Province". Fizi Media (in French). Archived from the original on 16 April 2019.
- Nzadi News (7 March 2019). "Territoriale-Kasumbalesa : André Kapamba premier maire de la nouvelle ville". Nzadi News (in French).
- Commission Électorale Nationale Indépendante. "Interactive Electoral Maps of the 26 Provinces". www.ceni.cd (in French).
- Commission Électorale Nationale Indépendante (27 July 2017). Rapport Annuel Juin 2016–Mai 2017 (PDF) (in French). Archived (PDF) from the original on 23 February 2020.
- Okonda, Francois (13 June 2019). "Bas-Uele : » Buta peine à se faire ville suite à l'incivisme fiscal », dixit le maire Charlie Kwateba". Les Depêches de la Tshopo (in French). Archived from the original on 15 April 2020.
- "Constitution de la Republique Democratique du Congo" [The Constitution of the Democratic Republic of the Congo] (PDF). LEGANET.CD (in French). 20 January 2011. Archived (PDF) from the original on 21 February 2019.
- "Loi organique n° 10/011 du 18 mai 2010 portant fixation des subdivisions territoriales à l'intérieur des provinces" [Organic Law No. 10/011 of 18 May 2010 determining the territorial subdivisions within the provinces]. LEGANET.CD (in French). Archived from the original on 21 February 2019.
- Musau, Mathy (12 December 2019). "Enfin, les élections urbaines et locales en 2020, promet Fatshi". Forum Des As (in French). Archived from the original on 8 May 2020.
- "Annexes a la loi portant adoption de la repartition des sieges par circonscription electorale pour les elections legislatives" (PDF). www.ceni.cd (in French). CENI. pp. 8–13. Archived (PDF) from the original on 20 September 2018.
- "Democratic Republic of the Congo 2018 Harmonized Presidential, Parliamentary and Provincial Elections" (PDF). Carter Center: Expert Mission Report. 19 December 2019.
- Lubaki, Corneille (30 October 2019). "[Au-delà de la non-tenue des élections locales...] Assemblée nationale : Corneille Nangaa remet le rapport final du processus électoral". La Prospérité Online (in French). Archived from the original on 1 November 2019.
- "RDC: 2 millions de signatures pour la tenue des élections locales". RFI (in French). 17 August 2019. Archived from the original on 26 February 2020.
- "RDC: la Ligue des électeurs insiste sur l'importance des élections locales". RFI (in French). 21 July 2019.
- "Elections municipales et locales : les femmes politiques déplorent le retard dans la convocation de l'électorat". Radio Okapi (in French). 4 May 2019.
- "Setting Fire to Your Own House" (PDF). Congo Research Group: Report. July 2018. Archived (PDF) from the original on 19 March 2019.
- "Loi nº15/015 du 25 août 2015 fixant le statut des chefs coutumiers" (in French). Archived from the original on 14 November 2019.
- "RDC : la CENI envisage l'organisation des élections du Président, des députés et des conseillers en décembre 2023". Radio Okapi (in French). 3 February 2022. Archived from the original on 3 February 2022.
- "RDC : La CENI publie le calendrier électoral du cycle 2022–2027". Radio Okapi (in French). 26 November 2022.
- CENI. "Synthese du Calendrier des Activites Electorales" (PDF) (in French). Radio Okapi. Archived (PDF) from the original on 30 November 2022.
