= Luapula-Moero District =

Luapula-Moero
- District
- Location within Democratic Republic of the Congo
- Coordinates: 11.666667°S 27.483333°E
- Country: Belgian Congo
- Province: Katanga
- District: Luapula-Moero District

Luapula-Moero District was a district of the pre-2015 Katanga Province in the Belgian Congo and Democratic Republic of the Congo. It roughly corresponded in area to the present Haut-Katanga Province.

== Belgian Congo ==
The original four provinces of the Belgian Congo had considerable autonomy, but in 1933 they were reorganized into six provinces, named after their capitals, and the central government assumed more control. Katanga became Elisabethville Province. The number of districts in the colony was reduced to 15. Elisabethville Province was divided into Lualaba District in the west, and Tanganika and Haut-Katanga in the east.

By 1954 the number of districts in Katanga had been expanded to include the districts of Elisabethville, Tanganika, a smaller Lualaba, Haut-Lomami and Luapula-Moero. Luapula-Moero District had replaced the smaller Haut-Katanga District, expanded by the addition of territory taken from the east of Lualaba District. A 1955–1957 map shows Luapula-Moero District bordering Tanganika District to the north, British territories to the east and south, Lualaba District to the west and Haut-Lomami District to the northwest. It covered an area of 109,000 square kilometres (42,000 sq mi) out of 496,700 square kilometres (191,800 sq mi) for Katanga as a whole.

== Post-independence ==
On 11 July 1960, a few days after the Congo Republic had gained independence, the province of Katanga seceded as an independent state. In November 1961 the northern portion was reconquered by the national government and made the province of Nord-Katanga. On 21 January 1963 the remainder of Katanga was reconquered and divided into the provinces of Lualaba and Katanga Oriental. Nord-Katanga, Lualaba and Katanga Oriental were merged back into the province of Katanga on 28 December 1966. In 2015 Haut-Katanga was formed from the Haut-Katanga district and the independently administered cities of Likasi and Lubumbashi. Lubumbashi retained its status as a provincial capital.

== Gallery ==
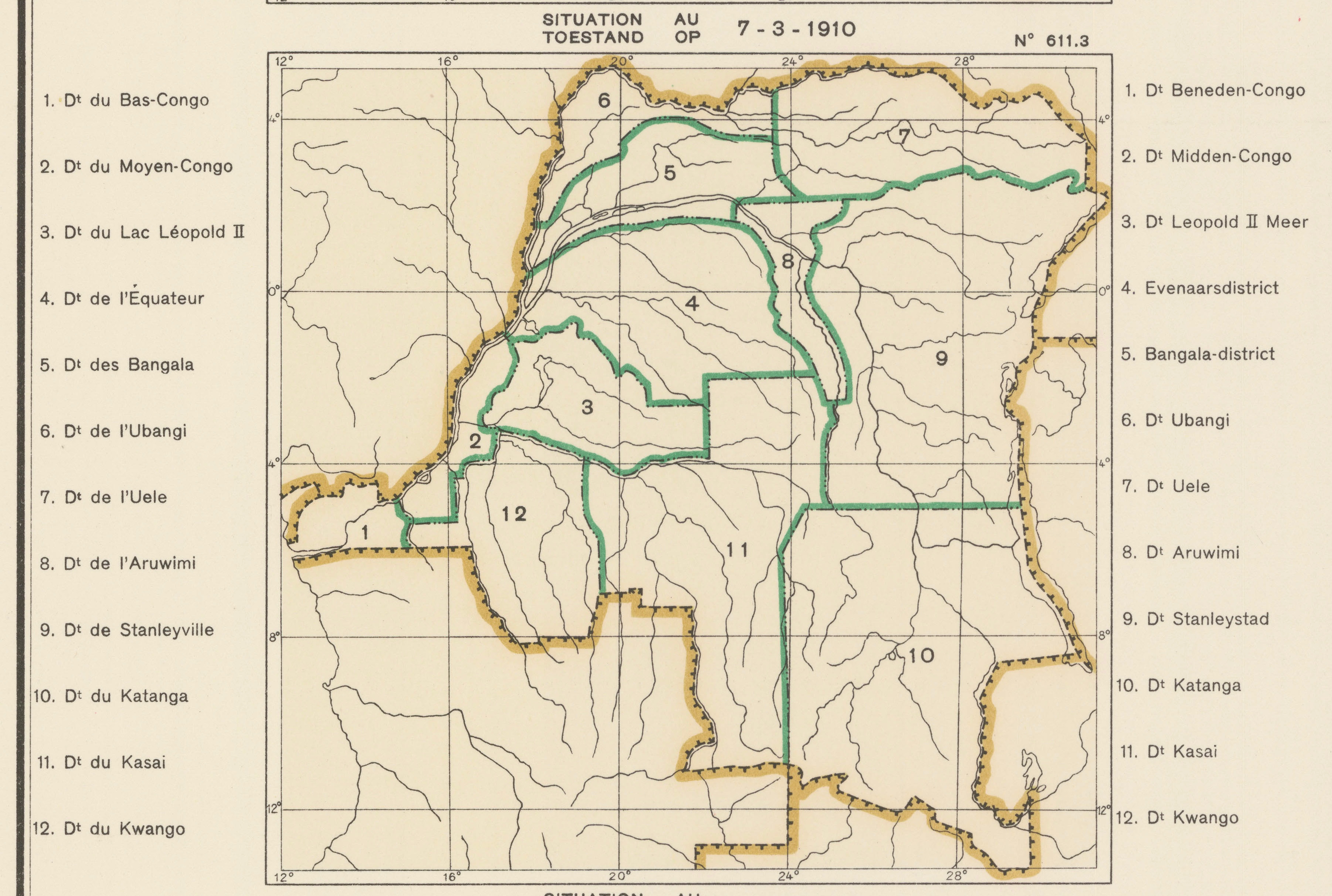
1910 districts. Katanga in the southeast

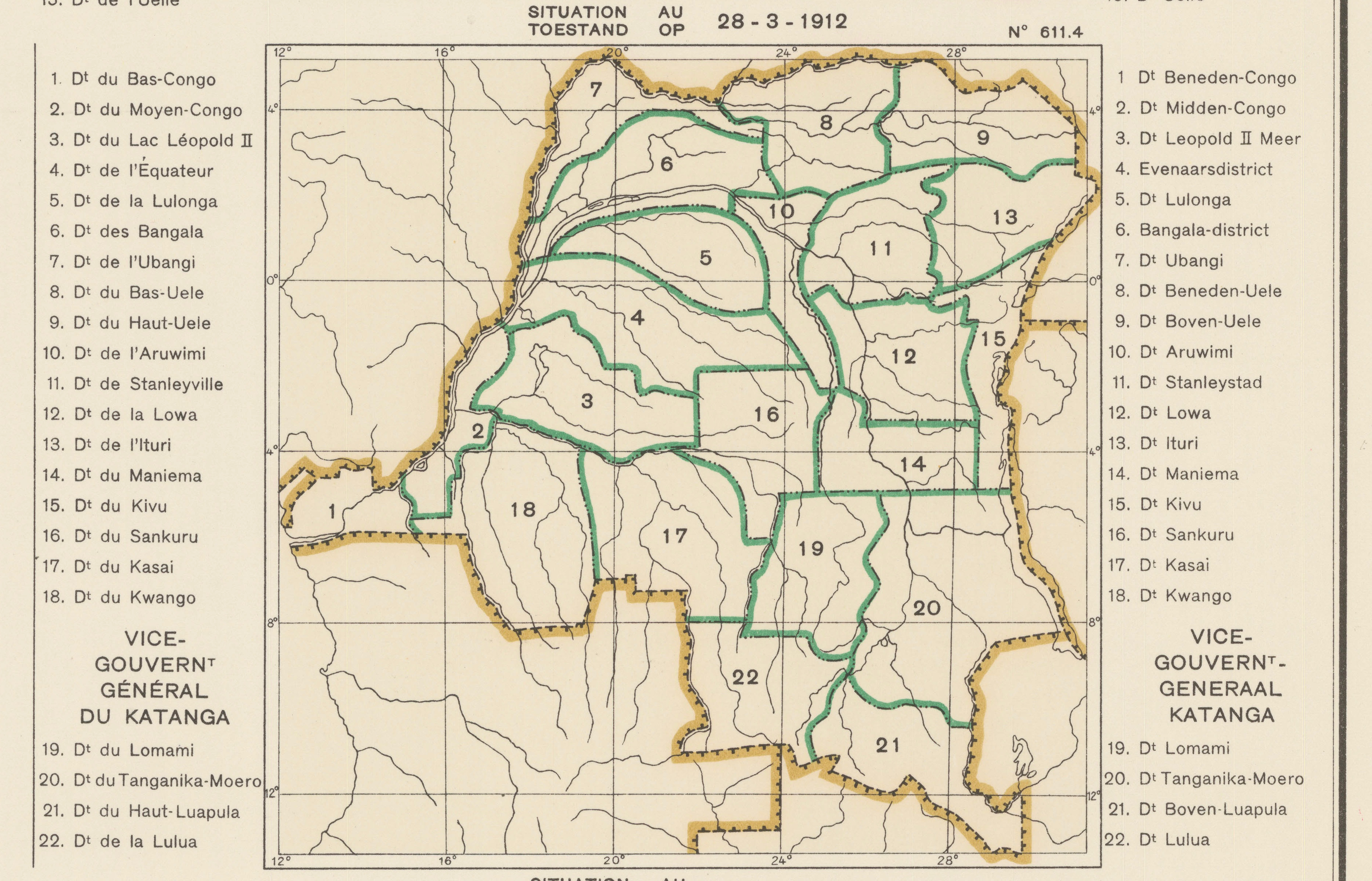
1912 provinces and districts. Katanga expanded to the west and divided into districts

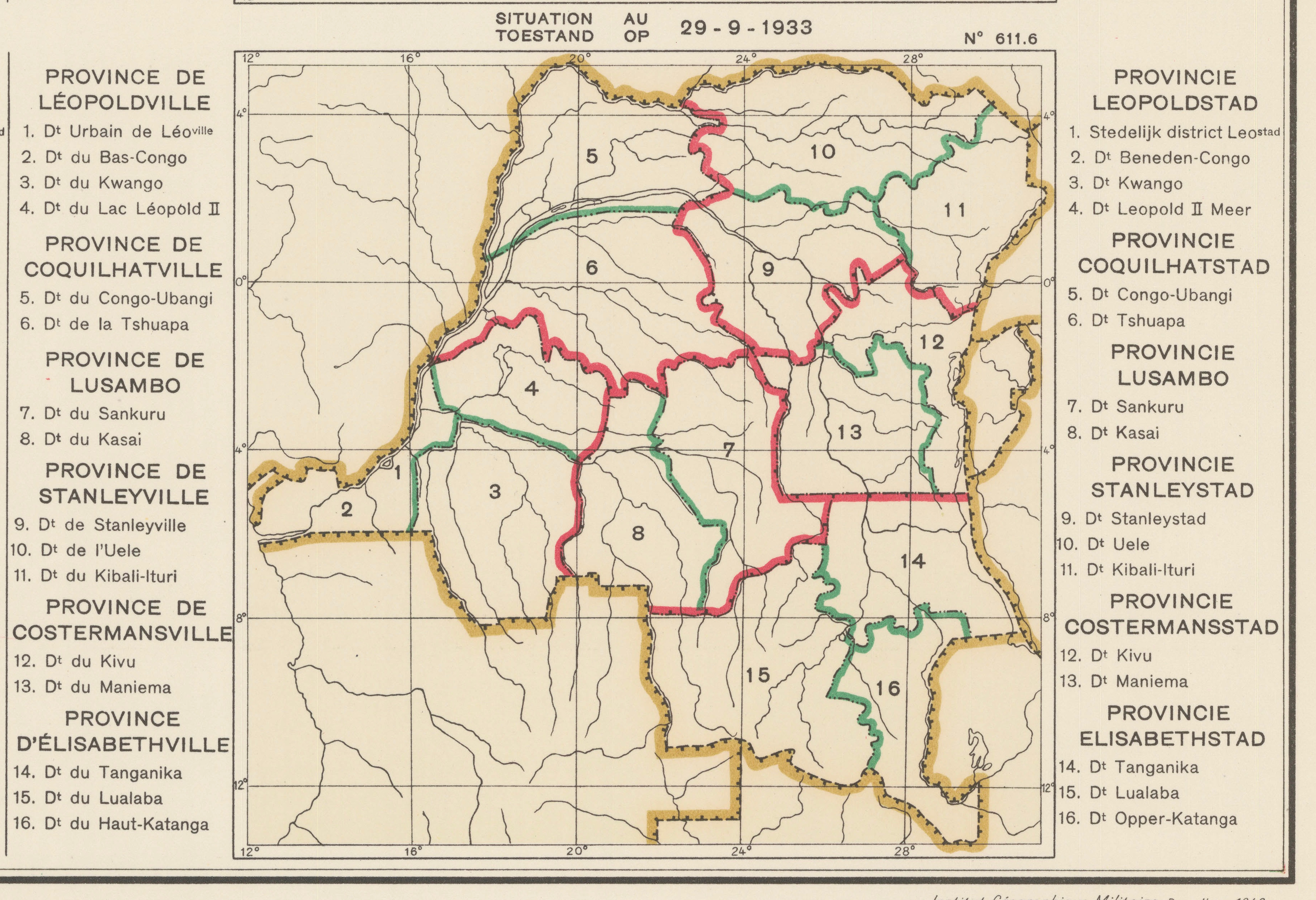
1933 provinces and districts. Haut-Katanga in the southeast of Katanga

The present Haut-Katanga province

== See also ==
- Districts of the Congo Free State
- Districts of the Belgian Congo
- Districts of the Democratic Republic of the Congo

== Sources ==
- Atlas général du Congo / Algemene atlas van Congo (in French and Dutch), Belgium: Institut Royal Colonial Belge, 1948–1963, OCLC 681334449
- Brass, William (8 December 2015), Demography of Tropical Africa, Princeton University Press, ISBN 978-1-4008-7714-0
- Bruneau, Jean-Claude (30 June 2009), "Les nouvelles provinces de la République Démocratique du Congo : construction territoriale et ethnicités", L'Espace Politique, 7 (2009–1), doi:10.4000/espacepolitique.1296
- "Congo (Kinshasa) Provinces", Rulers.org
- Lemarchand, René (1964), Political Awakening in the Belgian Congo, University of California Press, GGKEY:TQ2J84FWCXN
