= Lualaba =

Lualaba may refer to:

- Lualaba District, a district in the former Katanga Province in the Democratic Republic of the Congo
- Lualaba Province, a province of the DRC
- Lualaba River, the greatest headstream of the Congo River, DRC
