= Kafubu River =

Kafubu River may refer to:

- Kafubu River (Haut-Katanga), a river in Haut-Katanga Province, Democratic Republic of the Congo
- Kafubu River (Zambia), a river in Zambia
