= Jean-Claude Kazembe Musonda =

Congolese politician (1963–2021)

Governor of Haut-Katanga
- In office 1 January 2016 – 9 September 2017
- Preceded by: position established
- Succeeded by: Céléstin Pande Kapopo

Personal details
- Born: Kazembe Musonda; 17 May 1963 Kashobwe, Congo
- Died: 31 July 2021 (aged 58) Lubumbashi, Democratic Republic of the Congo
- Party: PPRD

Jean-Claude Kazembe Musonda (17 May 1963 – 31 July 2021) was a Congolese politician.

== Biography ==
He served as the first Governor of Haut-Katanga Province following the 2015 repartitioning.
