= Haut-Lomami District =

- District
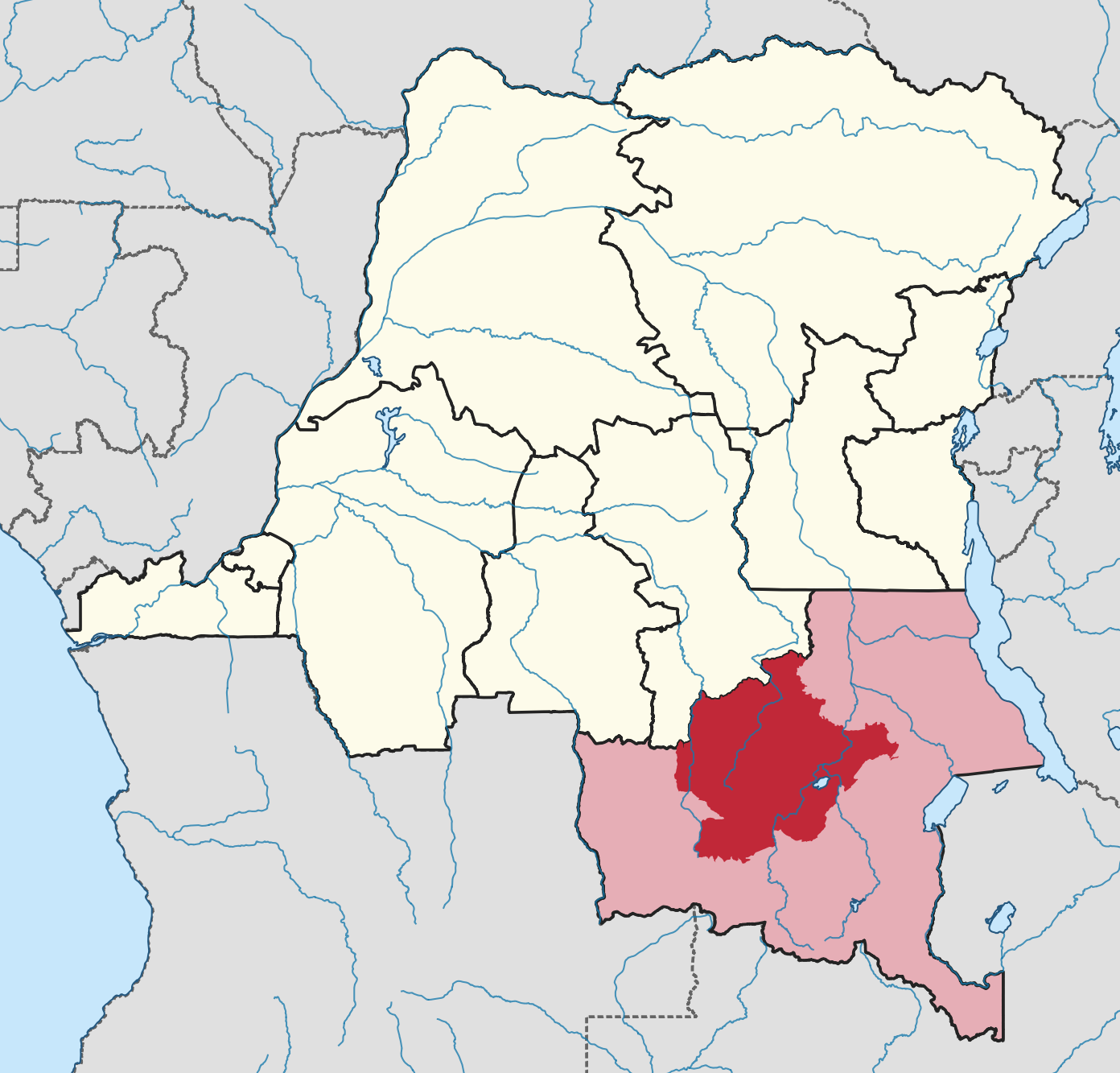
- Haut-Lomami district of Katanga province (2014)
- Coordinates: 10.304900°S 25.887376°E
- Country: Democratic Republic of the Congo
- Province: Katanga
- District: Haut-Lomami District

Haut-Lomami District was a district of the pre-2015 Katanga Province in the Democratic Republic of the Congo. The district dates back to the days of the Belgian Congo. At its greatest extent it roughly corresponded to the northern part of the current Lualaba Province and to the present Haut-Lomami Province.

== Belgian Congo ==
The original four provinces of the Belgian Congo had considerable autonomy, but in 1933 they were reorganized into six provinces, named after their capitals, and the central government assumed more control. Katanga became Elisabethville Province. The number of districts in the colony was reduced to 15. Elisabethville Province was divided into Lualaba District in the west, and Tanganika District and Haut-Katanga District in the east.

By 1955 Lualaba had been greatly reduced in size, with the northern part of the district split off as Haut-Lomami District and part of the east transferred to Luapula-Moero District. A 1955–1957 map shows Haut-Lomami District bordered by Lulua District and Kabinda District to the north, Tanganika District to the northeast., Luapula-Moero District to the southeast, Lualaba District to the south and Portuguese territories to the west. The area was 163,300 square kilometres (63,100 sq mi) out of a total of 496,700 square kilometres (191,800 sq mi) for Katanga province as a whole.

== Post-independence ==
On 11 July 1960, a few days after the Congo Republic had gained independence, the province of Katanga seceded as an independent state. In November 1961 the northern portion was reconquered by the national government and made the province of Nord-Katanga. On 21 January 1963 the remainder of Katanga was reconquered and divided into the provinces of Lualaba and Katanga Oriental. Nord-Katanga, Lualaba and Katanga Oriental were merged back into the province of Katanga on 28 December 1966. In 2015 Haut-Lomami Province was formed from Haut-Lomami district, whose town of Kamina was elevated to capital city of the new province.

== Gallery ==
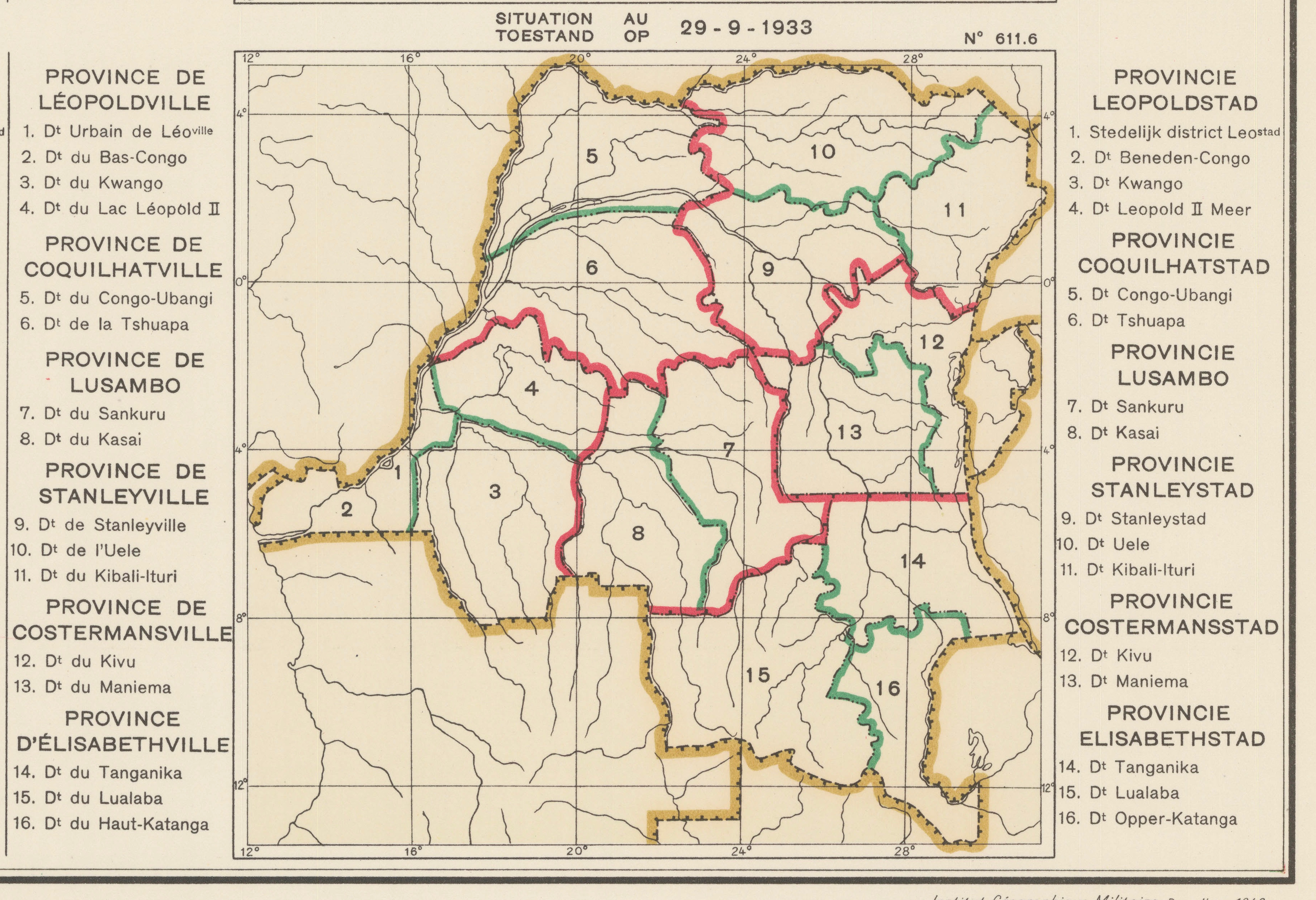
1933 provinces and districts. Lualaba in the west of Katanga

The current Lualaba Province

The current Haut-Lomami Province

== See also ==
- Districts of the Congo Free State
- Districts of the Belgian Congo
- Districts of the Democratic Republic of the Congo

== Sources ==
- Atlas général du Congo / Algemene atlas van Congo (in French and Dutch), Belgium: Institut Royal Colonial Belge, 1948–1963, OCLC 681334449
- Brass, William (8 December 2015), Demography of Tropical Africa, Princeton University Press, ISBN 978-1-4008-7714-0
- Bruneau, Jean-Claude (30 June 2009), "Les nouvelles provinces de la République Démocratique du Congo : construction territoriale et ethnicités", L'Espace Politique, 7 (2009–1), doi:10.4000/espacepolitique.1296
- "Congo (Kinshasa) Provinces", Rulers.org
- Higginson, John (1989), A Working Class in the Making: Belgian Colonial Labor Policy, Private Enterprise, and the African Mineworker, 1907-1951, Univ of Wisconsin Press, ISBN 978-0-299-12070-2
- Lemarchand, René (1964), Political Awakening in the Belgian Congo, University of California Press, GGKEY:TQ2J84FWCXN
- "Provinces of the Democratic Republic of Congo". Statiods.com.
