= Tanganika District =

- District
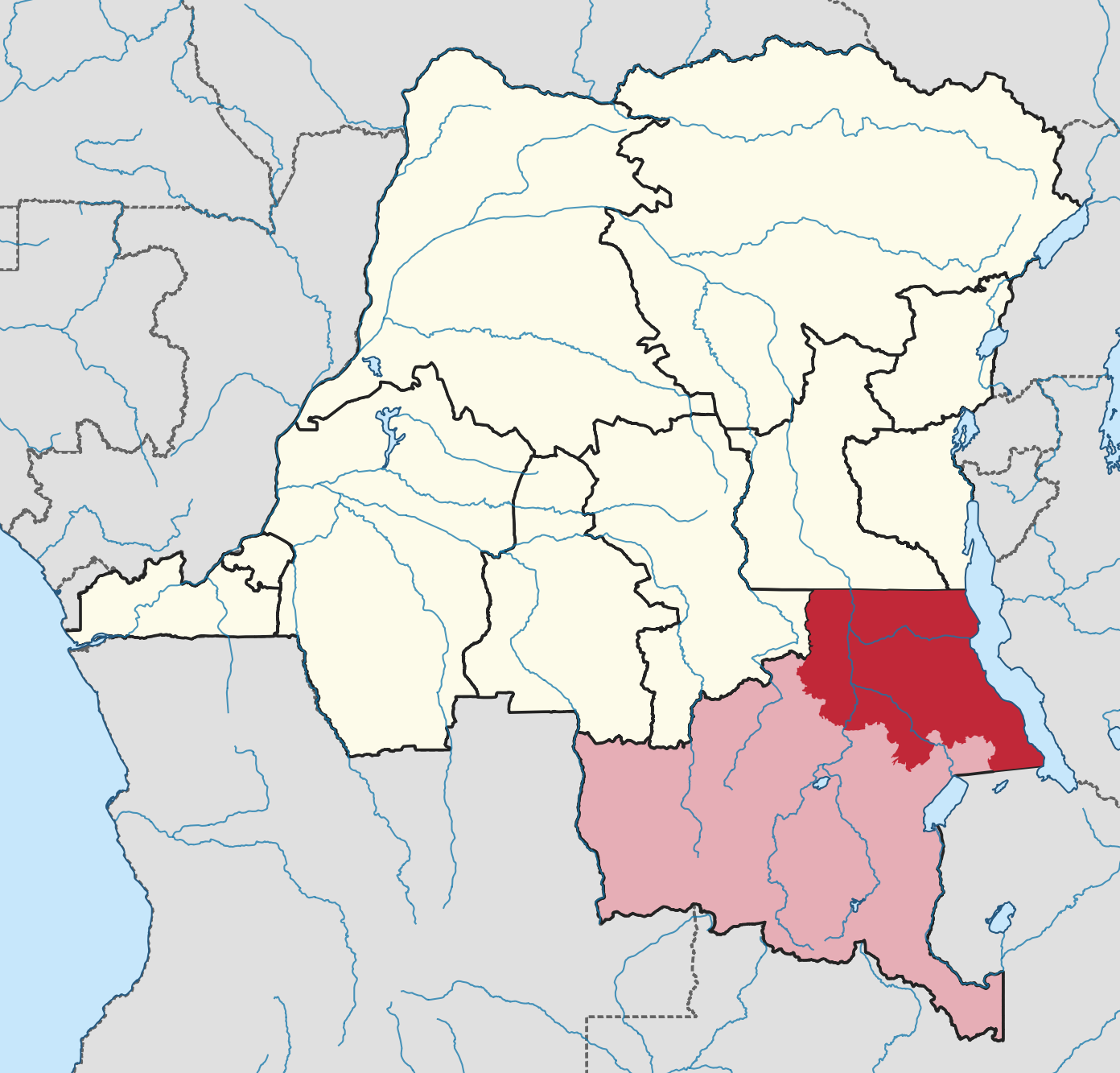
- Tanganyika district within Katanga province (2014)
- Coordinates: 5.916667°S 29.2°E
- Country: Democratic Republic of the Congo
- Province: Katanga
- District: Tanganika District

Tanganika District was a district of the pre-2015 Katanga Province in the Democratic Republic of the Congo. The district dates back to the days of the Belgian Congo. At its greatest extent it roughly corresponded to the present Tanganyika Province, with a small portion in the southwest now in Haut-Lomami Province.

== Belgian Congo ==
The original four provinces of the Belgian Congo had considerable autonomy, but in 1933 they were reorganized into six provinces, named after their capitals, and the central government assumed more control. Katanga became Elisabethville Province. The number of districts in the colony was reduced to 15.

Elisabethville Province was divided into Lualaba District in the west, and Tanganika and Haut-Katanga districts in the east. Tanganika District was formed from the northern part of the Tanganika-Moero District. A 1955–1957 map shows Tanganika District bordering Maniema District and Sud-Kivu District to the north, British territories to the east, Luapula-Moero District to the south, Haut-Lomami District to the southwest and Kabinda District to the west. The area was 135,000 square kilometres (52,000 sq mi) out of a total of 496,700 square kilometres (191,800 sq mi) for Katanga province as a whole.

== Post-Independence ==
On 11 July 1960, a few days after the Congo Republic had gained independence, the province of Katanga seceded as an independent state. In November 1961 the northern portion was reconquered by the national government and made the province of Nord-Katanga (Tanganika). On 21 January 1963 the remainder of Katanga was reconquered and divided into the provinces of Lualaba and Katanga Oriental. Nord-Katanga, Lualaba and Katanga Oriental were merged back into the province of Katanga on 28 December 1966. In 2015 the current Tanganyika Province was created from the Tanganika District, whose town of Kalemie was elevated to capital city of the new province.

== Gallery ==
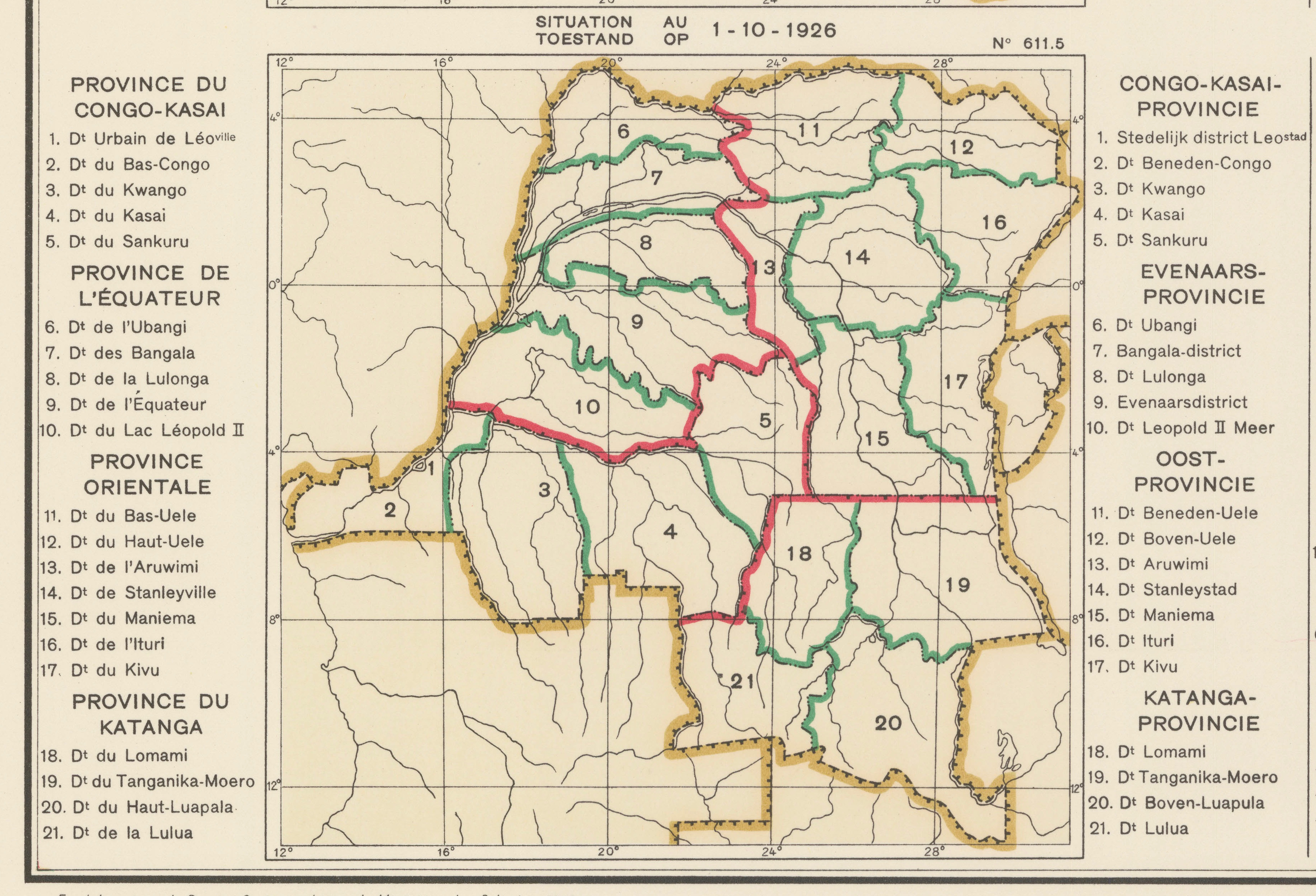
1926 provinces and districts. Katanga divided into districts

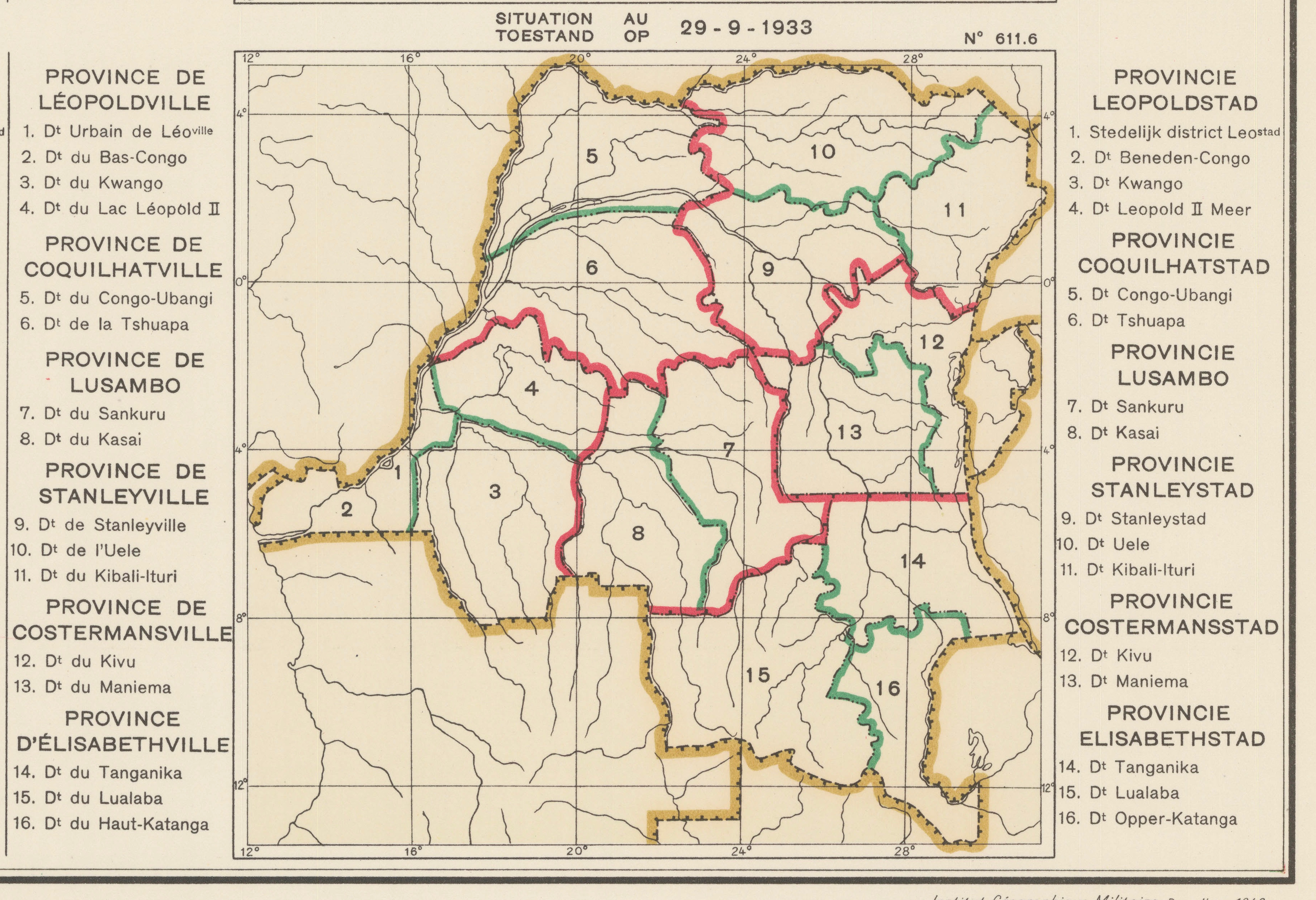
1933 provinces and districts.

The current Tanganyika Province

The current Haut-Lomami Province

== See also ==
- Districts of the Belgian Congo
- Districts of the Democratic Republic of the Congo

== Sources ==
- Atlas général du Congo / Algemene atlas van Congo (in French and Dutch), Belgium: Institut Royal Colonial Belge, 1948–1963, OCLC 681334449
- Brass, William (8 December 2015), Demography of Tropical Africa, Princeton University Press, ISBN 978-1-4008-7714-0
- Bruneau, Jean-Claude (30 June 2009), "Les nouvelles provinces de la République Démocratique du Congo : construction territoriale et ethnicités", L'Espace Politique, 7 (2009–1), doi:10.4000/espacepolitique.1296
- "Congo (Kinshasa) Provinces", Rulers.org
- Lemarchand, René (1964), Political Awakening in the Belgian Congo, University of California Press, GGKEY:TQ2J84FWCXN
