= Kafubu River (Haut-Katanga) =

Kafubu
- Location within Democratic Republic of the Congo

Location
- Country: Democratic Republic of the Congo
- Province: Haut-Katanga
- Territory: Kipushi Territory

Physical characteristics
- Source
  - location: Shimpauka village (Kaponda chiefdom)
- Mouth: Luapula River
  - location: Kanga village (Kinama chiefdom)
  - coordinates: 11.5175°S 28.3924°E
- Length: 135 kilometres (84 mi)

Kafubu is a river in the Haut-Katanga Province, Democratic Republic of the Congo. It gives its name to a health zone.

== Course ==
The Kafubu River is the main river of Kipushi Territory. It is about 135 kilometres (84 mi) long. It originates in the Shimpauka village (Kaponda chiefdom) and runs through the territory from east to west to join the Luapula river at Kanga village (Kinama chiefdom). It forms near the city of Kipushi, passes through the south of Lubumbashi and then runs eastward through the Kafubu health zone to the border with Zambia where it joins the Luapula River.

Labeo polli, an edible carp, is found only in the Kafubu River and the Kanshéle River (Kivu), both in the Upper Congo River basin. Villages in the Kafubu Valley include Chileuge, Kibulu, Mwenda, Kiponda, and Kamankanga. The farmers mainly grow corn as a cash crop. They plow and sow the corn by hand, but are unable to afford fertilizer, so yields are low.

== Pollution ==
In 2002 and 2003 World Bank consultants at SNC-Lavalin International studied 32 copper and cobalt mining sites in Katanga. They found that waste from the Luiswishi cobalt mine being processed Kipushi in was discharged into the Kafubu River and surrounding fields. A sample of the waste showed high levels of arsenic, cadmium, copper, lead and zinc. These cause damage to humans and to the river fauna.

== Health zone ==
In July 2015 the rural health zone recorded a case of poliovirus derived from the vaccine strain (VDPV) type 2. In March 2016 Dr Yokouidé Allarangar, World Health Organization representative in the DRC, visited the district to encourage the management team of the health zone to improve vaccination coverage.

== Sources ==
- "Coordination Technique Pour Le Développement (CTD)", Pledge, archived from the original on 2021-09-25
- Labeo polli (a carp, no common name) Ecological Risk Screening Summary (PDF), U.S. Fish and Wildlife Service, March 2012
- Nordbrand, Sara; Bolme, Petter (November 2007), Powering the Mobile World: Cobalt production for batteries in the DR Congo and Zambia (PDF), SwedWatch
- "Relation: Kafubu (10786592)", OpenStreetMap
- Territoire de Kipushi: Données géographiques, Cellule d'Analyses des Indicateurs de Développement (CAID)
- Visitant la zone de santé rurale de Kafubu ... (in French), 1 April 2016
