= Labeo polli =

Conservation status
- Data Deficient (IUCN 3.1)

Scientific classification
- Kingdom: Animalia
- Phylum: Chordata
- Class: Actinopterygii
- Order: Cypriniformes
- Family: Cyprinidae
- Subfamily: Labeoninae
- Genus: Labeo
- Species: L. polli

Binomial name
- Labeo polli Tshibwabwa, 1997

Species of fish

Labeo polli is a species of fish in the genus Labeo from the Congo Basin. It is found only in the Kafubu River (Haut-Katanga) and the Kanshéle River (Kivu).
