= Sakania Territory =

Territory in the Democratic Republic of the Congo

Sakania Wilaya ya Sakania (Swahili)
- Territory
- Interactive map of Sakania
- Location within Democratic Republic of the Congo
- Coordinates: 11.767000°S 27.233000°E
- Country: DR Congo
- Province: Haut-Katanga
- Time zone: UTC+2 (CAT)

Sakania is a territory in the Haut-Katanga Province of the Democratic Republic of the Congo. Sakania Territory makes up the majority of the Congo Pedicle, a salient of the Democratic Republic of the Congo surrounded by Zambia.

The territory has mineral resources, including copper and cobalt. The capital of Sakania Territory is the city of Sakania, with approximately 50,000 residents.
