= Kipushi Territory =

Kipushi Wilaya ya Kipushi (Swahili)
- Territory
- Interactive map of Kipushi
- Location within Democratic Republic of the Congo
- Coordinates: 11.767000°S 27.233000°E
- Country: DR Congo
- Province: Haut-Katanga
- Time zone: UTC+2 (CAT)

Kipushi is a territory in the Haut-Katanga Province of the Democratic Republic of the Congo.

The main river is the 135 kilometres (84 mi) long Kafubu River, which flows through the territory from east to west to join the Lualaba River on the border with Zambia.

Kipushite, a copper-zinc phosphate mineral, is named after a mine located in the territory. Other than mining, subsistence farming is the major occupation. Goat herding is also important for the local economy, which has been affected by brucellosis.
