= Haut-Katanga Province =

Haut-Katanga Province du Haut-Katanga (French) Mkoa wa Katanga Juu (Swahili)
- Province
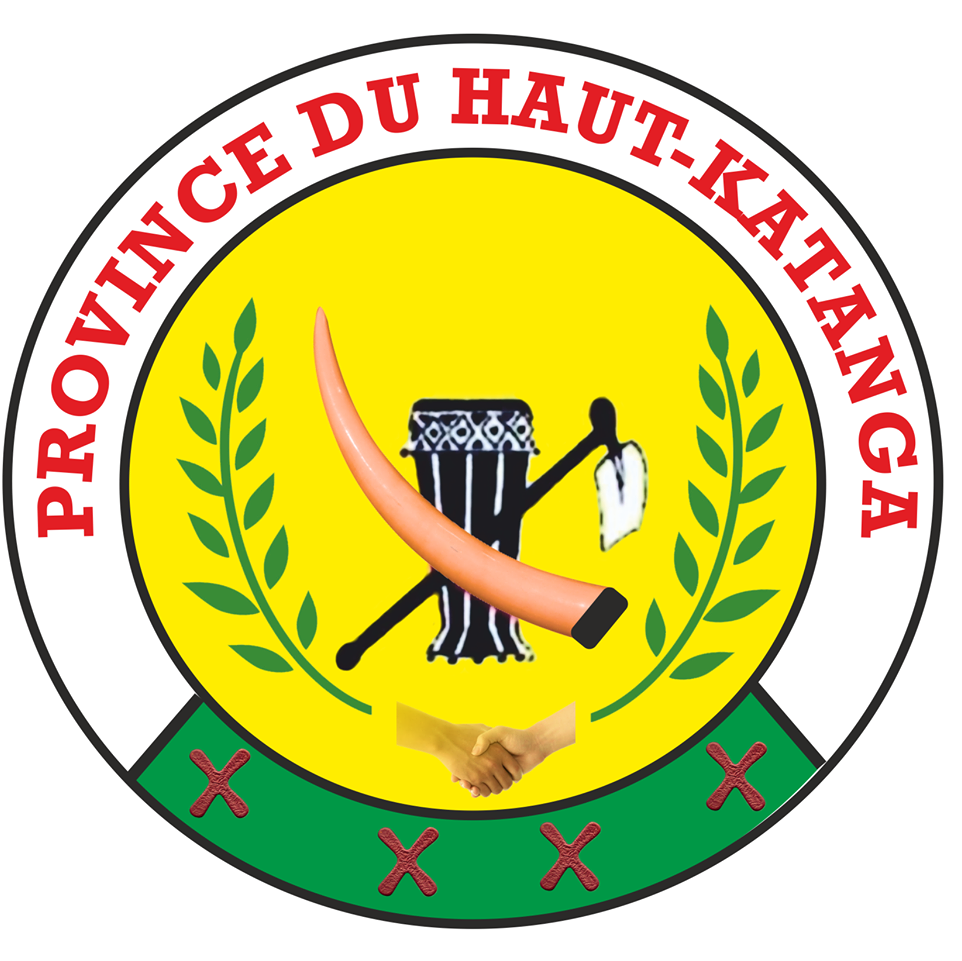
- Seal

- Coordinates: 11°40′S 27°29′E
- Country: DR Congo
- Established: 16 July 2015
- Capital and largest city: Lubumbashi

Government
  - Governor: Jacques Kyabula

Area
  - Total: 132,425 km^{2} (51,130 sq mi)
  - Rank: 5th

Population (2020)
  - Total: 5,718,800
  - Rank: 6th
  - Density: 43.185/km^{2} (111.85/sq mi)

Ethnic groups
  - Native: Balamba • Balala • Baaushi • Ababemba • Bakaonde • Baluba • Bataabwa • Babwile • Garanganze(Bayeke)
  - Settler: Congolese Banyarwanda
- Time zone: UTC+2 (CAT)
- License Plate Code: (Democratic Republic of the Congo) CGO / 04
- Official language: French
- National language: Kiswahili
- Website: www.facebook.com/hautkatangaofficiel

Haut-Katanga (French for "Upper Katanga") is the southernmost province of the Democratic Republic of the Congo. Haut-Katanga and its neighboring provinces of Haut-Lomami, Lualaba, and Tanganyika were created in the 2015 repartitioning of the former province of Katanga. It was formed from the Haut-Katanga district and the independently administered cities of Likasi and Lubumbashi. Lubumbashi, the second-largest city in the DRC, is the provincial capital. It had an estimated population of 5,718,800 in 2020.

An early state that existed in present-day Haut-Katanga from the 17th century was the Lunda Empire. Industrial development began in the early 20th century with the colonial company Union Minière du Haut-Katanga, operating in the south of Katanga within Belgian Congo. The rise of mining caused migration from the Kasaï region, which led to ethnic and socioeconomic tensions. The industrialized south Katanga attempted to break away as an independent state in the early 1960s, just after the DRC achieved independence from Belgium, and there was a civil war with the agrarian and centralist north. It was brought back under the government's control with a UN intervention. In the following decades the Katanga Province, and in particular the south, experienced large-scale mining and infrastructure development. Katanga became the wealthiest region in the DRC and contributed over half of its GDP. It declined after 1980s, but recovered in the years after the Second Congo War.

The economy of Haut-Katanga is heavily dependent on mining, while other sectors such as tourism and agriculture are less developed. Along with Lualaba, it is in the Copperbelt of Central Africa, and the two provinces are the DRC's southern economic center. The production of copper and cobalt in Haut-Katanga is the foundation of the formal economy of the DRC. One of the largest copper deposits in the world is outside of Lubumbashi, and there are several industrial-scale mines in the province operated by DRC state-owned, Chinese, or multinational companies. Most miners in Haut-Katanga engage in artisanal mining, taking their production to trading posts in Lubumbashi or Likasi. Despite having over 2.7 million hectares of arable land, Haut-Katanga depends on food imports, because much of the land and the work force is used by the mining industry. The industry has also caused human rights and environmental problems.

== Geography ==
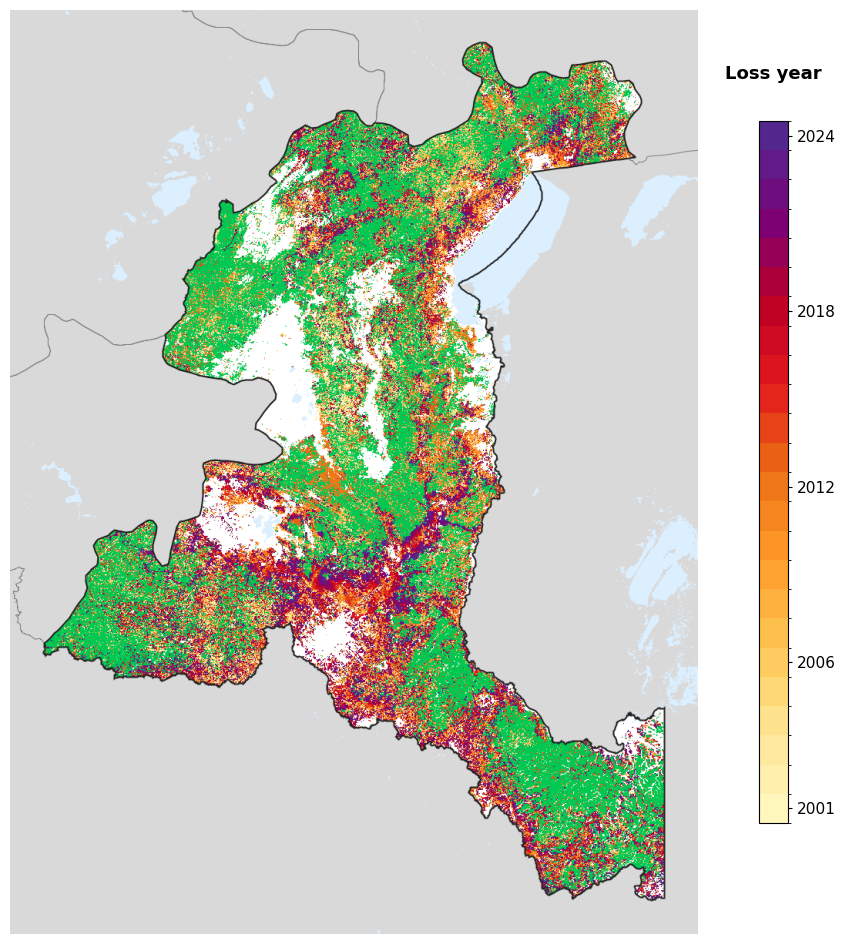
Tree-cover loss year in Haut-Katanga, 2001-2024, from the Global Forest Change dataset.

Haut-Katanga is the southernmost province of the Democratic Republic of the Congo and is part of the historic region and former province of Katanga. It borders Haut-Lomami, Lualaba, and Tanganyika to the north and west, which were all created along with Haut-Katanga in the 2015 repartitioning of the Katanga Province. To the south and east, Haut-Katanga is on the DRC's international border with Zambia. The southern part of the province has a monsoon-influenced humid tropical climate, while the northern part has a tropical savanna climate.

== Administrative divisions ==
Haut-Katanga is divided into six territories and three independently administered cities.

Administrative division	Type	Map
Kipushi	City	N/A
Likasi	City	Likasi
Lubumbashi	City	Lubumbashi
Kambove	Territory	Kambove
Kasenga	Territory	Kasenga
Kipushi	Territory	Kipushi
Mitwaba	Territory	Mitwaba
Pweto	Territory	Pweto
Sakania	Territory	Sakania

== Governors of the Haut-Katanga province ==
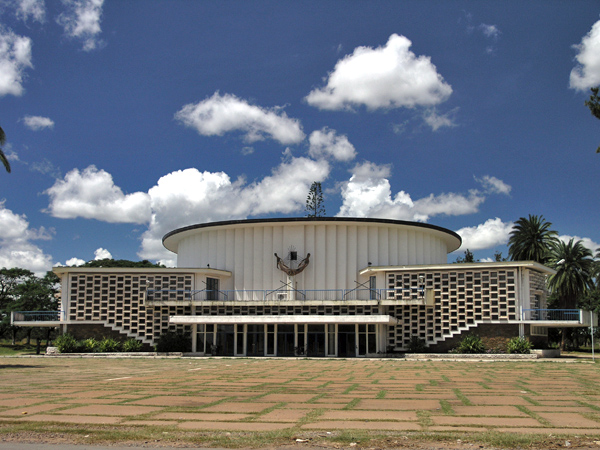
Provincial assembly building in Lubumbashi

- Jean-Claude Kazembe Musonda (2016 - 18 April 2017)
- Célestin Pande Kapopo (9 September 2017 - January 2019)
- Jacques Kyabula Katwe (10 April 2019 - 21 May 2026)
- Martin Kazembe Shula (16 July 2025 - present, serving as interim governor)

Martin Kazembe Shula has been acting as interim governor since July 2025, following the prolonged unavailability of Jacques Kyabula, who was retained in Kinshasa for several months. His interim status continues, as Kyabula’s resignation on 21 May 2026 did not automatically lead to Shula’s confirmation; only an election can do so.

=== Approximate correspondence between historical and current province ===
Approximate correspondence between historical and current province
Belgian Congo				Republic of the Congo		Zaire		Democratic Republic of the Congo	
1908	1919	1932	1947	1963	1966	1971	1988	1997	2015
22 districts	4 provinces	6 provinces	6 provinces	21 provinces + capital	8 provinces + capital	8 provinces + capital	11 provinces	11 provinces	26 provinces
Tanganika-Moero	Katanga	Élisabethville	Katanga	Nord-Katanga	Katanga	Shaba		Katanga	Tanganyika
Tanganika-Moero	Katanga	Élisabethville	Katanga	Nord-Katanga	Katanga	Shaba		Katanga	Haut-Lomami
Lulua	Katanga	Élisabethville	Katanga	Lualaba	Katanga	Shaba		Katanga	Lualaba
Haut-Luapula	Katanga	Élisabethville	Katanga	Katanga-Oriental	Katanga	Shaba		Katanga	Haut-Katanga
Lomami	Katanga	Lusambo	Kasaï	Lomami	Kasaï-Oriental				Lomami
