= Haut-Katanga District =

Former district of the Democratic Republic of the Congo

Coordinates: 11°40′S 027°28′E

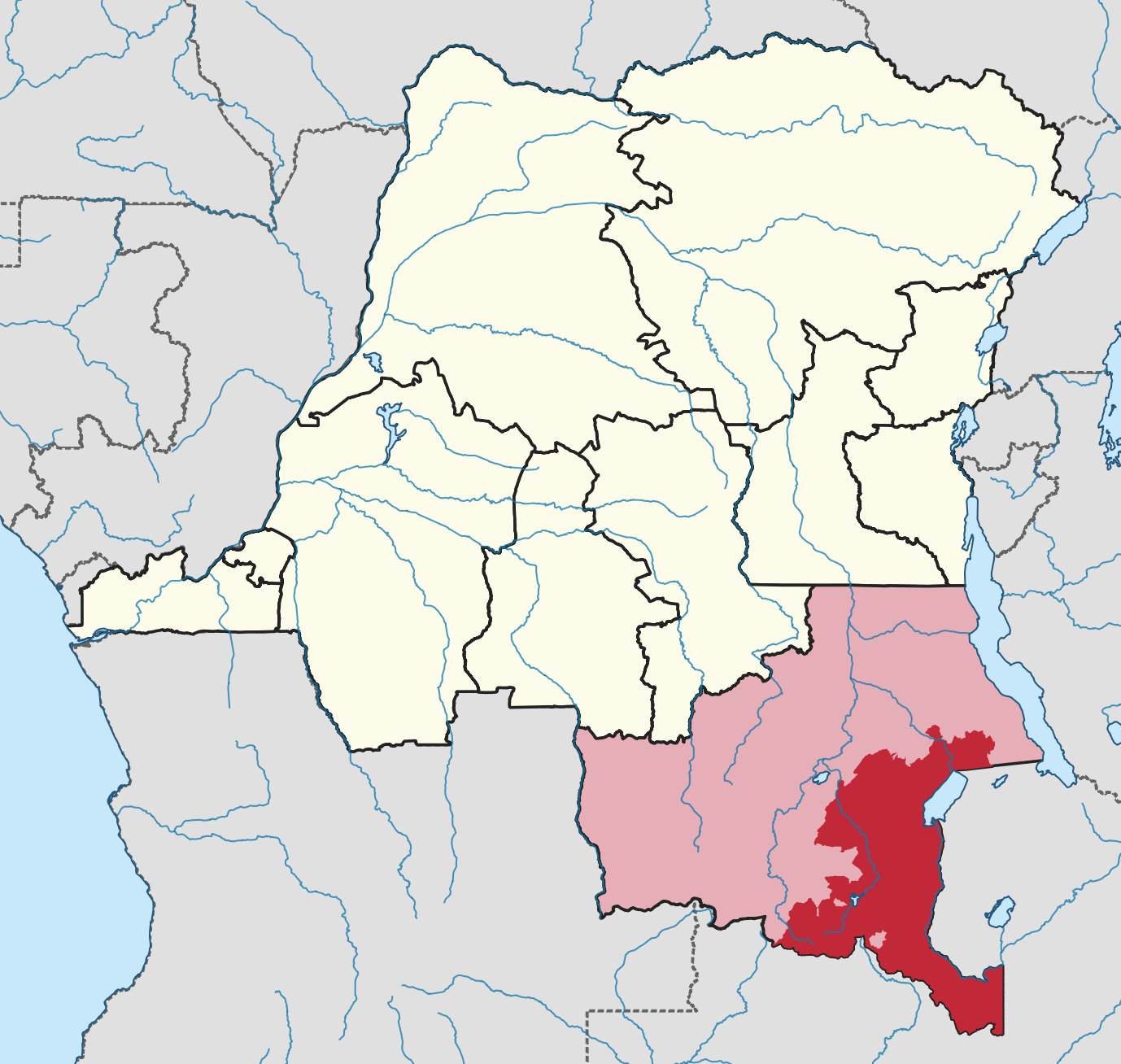
Location of Haut-Katanga district (red) in extreme south of the Democratic Republic of the Congo (2014)

Haut-Katanga District (Upper Katanga District) is a former district located in the former Katanga Province of the Democratic Republic of the Congo. The copper mining centers of Lubumbashi and Likasi were surrounded by the district but were administratively separate.

== Historical province ==
From 1963 to 1966, the area was constituted as Katanga Oriental. In 1966, it was merged with the former Lualaba Province to create Sud-Katanga, and was then merged into the new Shaba Region. Presidents of Katanga Oriental were:

- 13 Aug 1963 - 20 Jul 1965 Édouard Bulundwe (b. 1932)
- 20 Jul 1965 - 24 Apr 1966 Godefroid Munongo (s.a.)

=== Approximate correspondence between historical and current province ===
Approximate correspondence between historical and current province
Belgian Congo				Republic of the Congo		Zaire		Democratic Republic of the Congo	
1908	1919	1932	1947	1963	1966	1971	1988	1997	2015
22 districts	4 provinces	6 provinces	6 provinces	21 provinces + capital	8 provinces + capital	8 provinces + capital	11 provinces	11 provinces	26 provinces
Tanganika-Moero	Katanga	Élisabethville	Katanga	Nord-Katanga	Katanga	Shaba		Katanga	Tanganyika
Tanganika-Moero	Katanga	Élisabethville	Katanga	Nord-Katanga	Katanga	Shaba		Katanga	Haut-Lomami
Lulua	Katanga	Élisabethville	Katanga	Lualaba	Katanga	Shaba		Katanga	Lualaba
Haut-Luapula	Katanga	Élisabethville	Katanga	Katanga-Oriental	Katanga	Shaba		Katanga	Haut-Katanga
Lomami	Katanga	Lusambo	Kasaï	Lomami	Kasaï-Oriental				Lomami

== Successor provinces ==
Haut-Katanga district was part of a proposed Haut-Katanga province to be established when the country's new constitution was implemented, originally slated for February 2009. The new province was to include the current district and also the cities of Lubumbashi and Likasi, with Lubumbashi as its capital.

The re-partition was completed in 2015, forming Haut-Katanga Province.

== Territories ==
- Kambove
- Kasenga
- Kipushi
- Mitwaba
- Pweto
- Sakania
