= Lualaba Province =

Province of the Democratic Republic of the Congo

Lualaba Province du Lualaba (French) Mkoa wa Lualaba (Swahili)
- Province
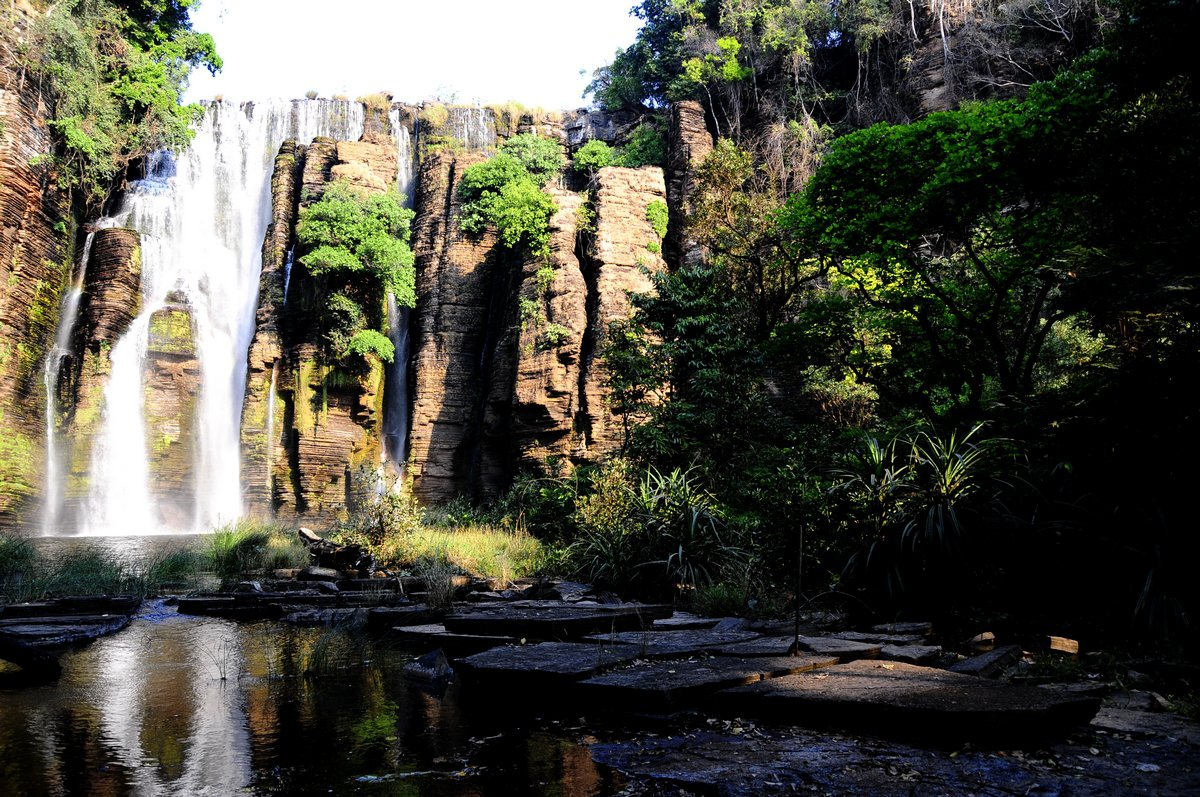
- View of Kayo Falls

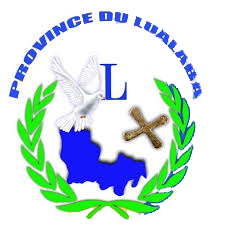
- Seal

- Coordinates: 10°43′S 25°28′E
- Country: DR Congo
- Established: 2015
- Named after: Lualaba River
- Capital and largest city: Kolwezi

Government
  - Governor: Fifi Masuka

Area
  - Total: 121,308 km^{2} (46,837 sq mi)
  - Rank: 8th

Population (2020 est.)
  - Total: 3,183,300
  - Rank: 13th
  - Density: 26.241/km^{2} (67.965/sq mi)

Ethnic groups
  - Native: Balunda • Kaonde • Baluntu • Baluba • Chokwe • Garanganze (Bayeke) • Balwalwa
- Time zone: UTC+2 (CAT)
- License Plate Code: (Democratic Republic of the Congo) CGO / 14
- Official language: French
- National language: Kiswahili
- Website: www.provincelualaba.cd

Lualaba Province (Mkoa wa Lualaba, in Swahili) is a province of the Democratic Republic of the Congo created in the 2015 repartitioning when the former Katanga province was split up into four new provinces—Lualaba, Haut-Katanga, Haut-Lomami, and Tanganyika. Lualaba was formed from the Lualaba and Kolwezi districts. Kolwezi was a hybrid city/district which was separated from its two territories and the city proper became the capital of the new province. The 2020 population was estimated to be 3,183,300.

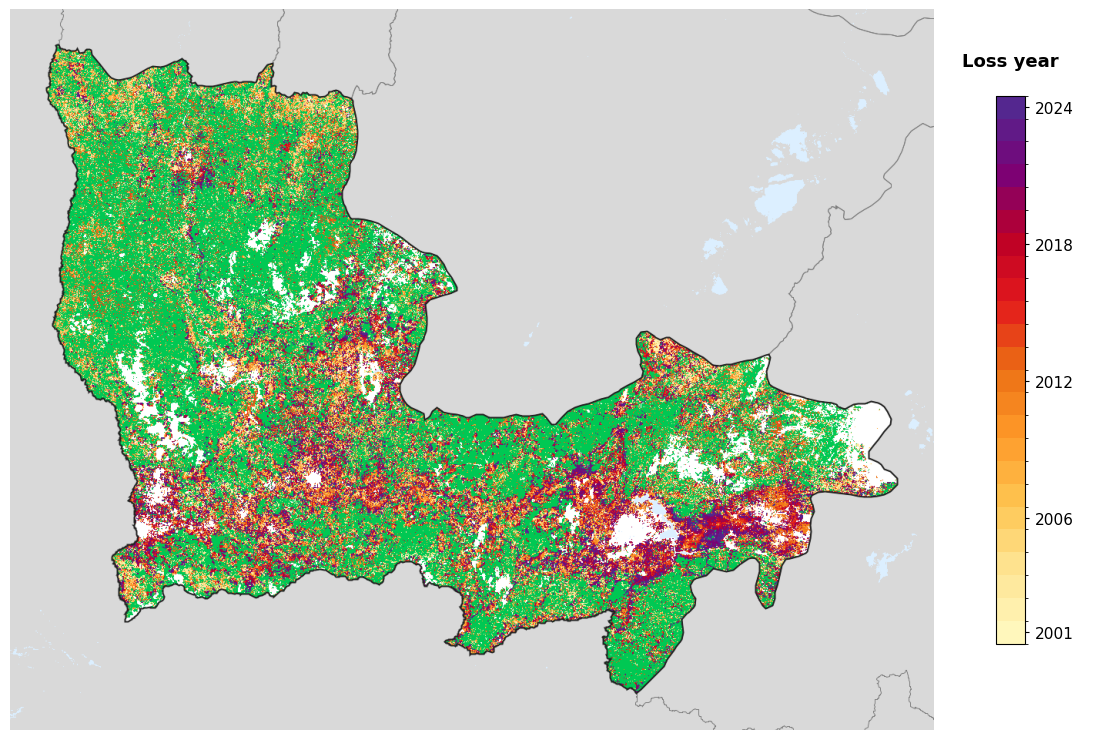
Tree-cover loss year in Lualaba, 2001-2024, from the Global Forest Change dataset.

Along with Haut-Katanga, Lualaba is in the Copperbelt of Central Africa. The Congo is only behind Chile, Peru, and China in the largest amount of copper produced globally.

== History ==
Lualaba Province was separated from Katanga Province on 30 June 1963. Then, on 24 April 1966, it was united with Katanga Oriental to form Sud-Katanga Province, which was later merged back into Katanga. The President of Lualaba, from 1965 the governor, was Dominique Diur who held office from 23 September 1963 until 24 April 1966.

== Administration ==
Lualaba is divided in to five territories and one independently administered city.

Administrative division	Type	Map
Kolwezi	City	Kolwezi
Dilolo	Territory	Dilolo
Kapanga	Territory	Kapanga
Lubudi	Territory	Lubudi
Mutshatsha	Territory	Mutshatsha
Sandoa	Territory	Sandoa
