= Lualaba District =

- District
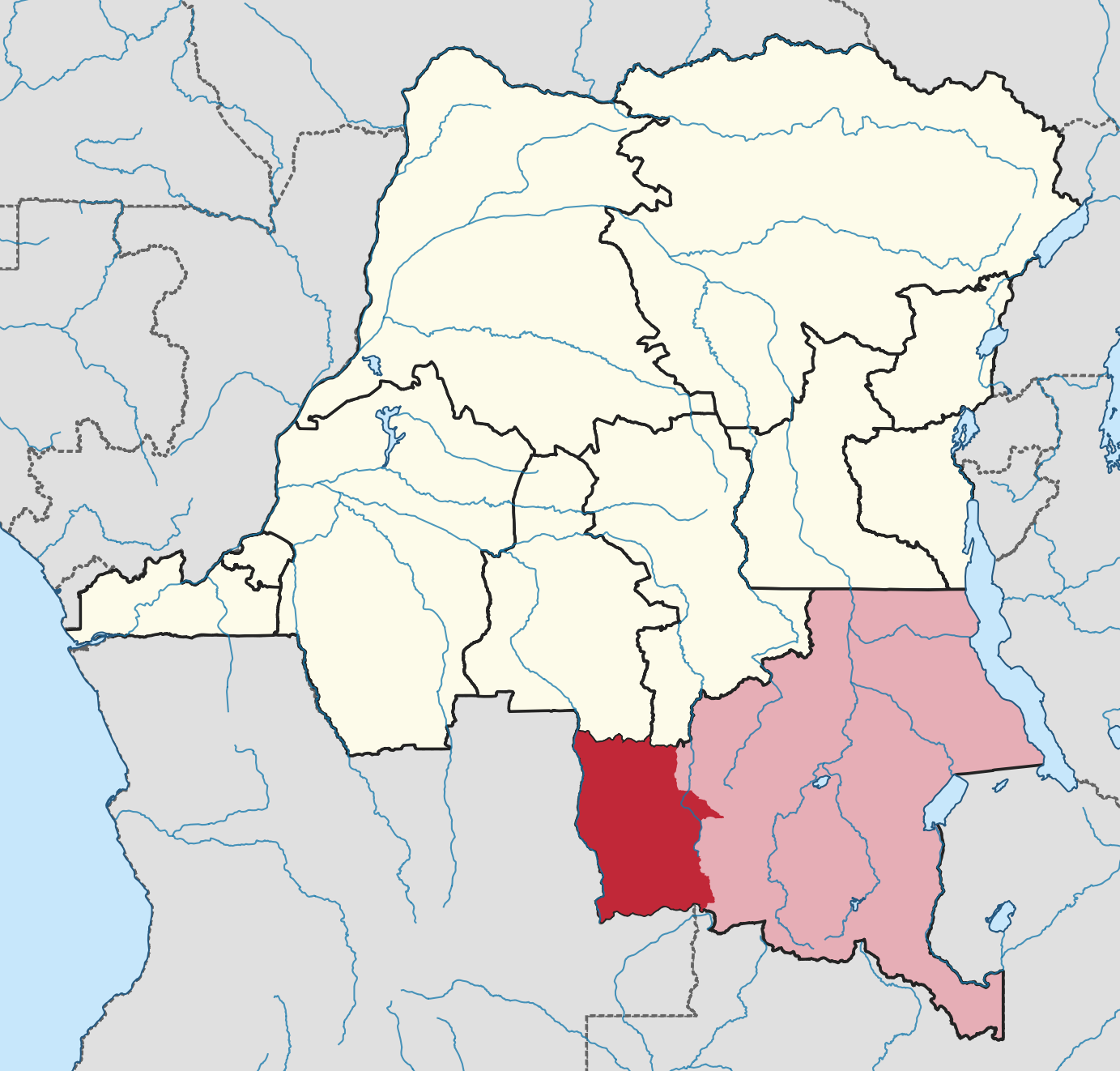
- Lualaba district of Katanga province (2014)
- Coordinates: 9.3°S 23.0°E
- Country: Democratic Republic of the Congo
- Province: Katanga
- District: Lualaba District

Lualaba District was a district of the pre-2015 Katanga Province in the Democratic Republic of the Congo. The district dates back to the days of the Congo Free State and the Belgian Congo. The original Lualaba District was merged into Katanga in 1910, but in 1933 a new Lualaba District was formed within Katanga. After various significant boundary changes, in 2015 the district became the western part of the present Lualaba Province.

== Congo Free State ==
Article 3 of the decree of 16 April 1887 provided for the Congo Free State to be divided into administrative districts headed by district commissioners, assisted by one or more deputies. The decree of 1 August 1888 divided the Congo Free State into eleven districts, of which the first five were in the lower Congo region. The east of the colony was divided into Aruwimi-Uele District in the north, Stanley Falls District in the center and Lualaba District in the south, with its headquarters in Lusambo. A map of the Congo Free State as of 1895 shows Lualaba District bordered by British possessions to the south and east, Stanley Falls District to the northeast, and Kasai District to the west.

== Belgian Congo ==
Belgium annexed the Congo Free State in 1908 as the Belgian Congo. Parts of the Stanley Falls and Lualaba districts were combined to form Katanga in 1910, which was called a vice-government general. An arrêté royal of 28 March 1912 divided the Congo into 22 districts. The vice-government of Katanga now contained the districts of Lomami and Lulua in the west, and Tanganika-Moero and Haut-Luapula in the east.

The original four provinces had considerable autonomy, but in 1933 they were reorganized into six provinces. These provinces were named after their capitals, and the central government assumed more control. Katanga became Elisabethville Province (Katanga). The number of districts was reduced to 15, with 102 territories. Elisabethville Province was divided into Lualaba in the west, and Tanganika and Haut-Katanga in the east. Lualaba contained more than half the population and land area of the province. Its administrative center was the industrial town of Jadotville. It took its name from the Lualaba River, which rises in the south and flows north into Tanganika District.

By 1955 Lualaba had been greatly reduced in size, with the northern part of the district split off as Haut-Lomami District and part of the east transferred to Luapula-Moero District. A 1955–1957 map shows Lualaba District bordering Haut-Lomami District to the north, Luapula-Moero District to the east, and British territories to the south. Lualaba now had an area of 88,700 square kilometres (34,200 sq mi) out of 496,700 square kilometres (191,800 sq mi) for Katanga as a whole.

== Post-independence ==
On 11 July 1960, a few days after the Congo Republic had gained independence, the province of Katanga seceded as an independent state. In November 1961 the northern portion was reconquered by the national government and made the province of Nord-Katanga. On 21 January 1963 the remainder of Katanga was reconquered and divided into the provinces of Lualaba and Katanga Oriental. Nord-Katanga, Lualaba and Katanga Oriental were merged back into the province of Katanga on 28 December 1966. In 2015 the current Lualaba Province was created from the Lualaba and Kolwezi districts.

== Gallery ==
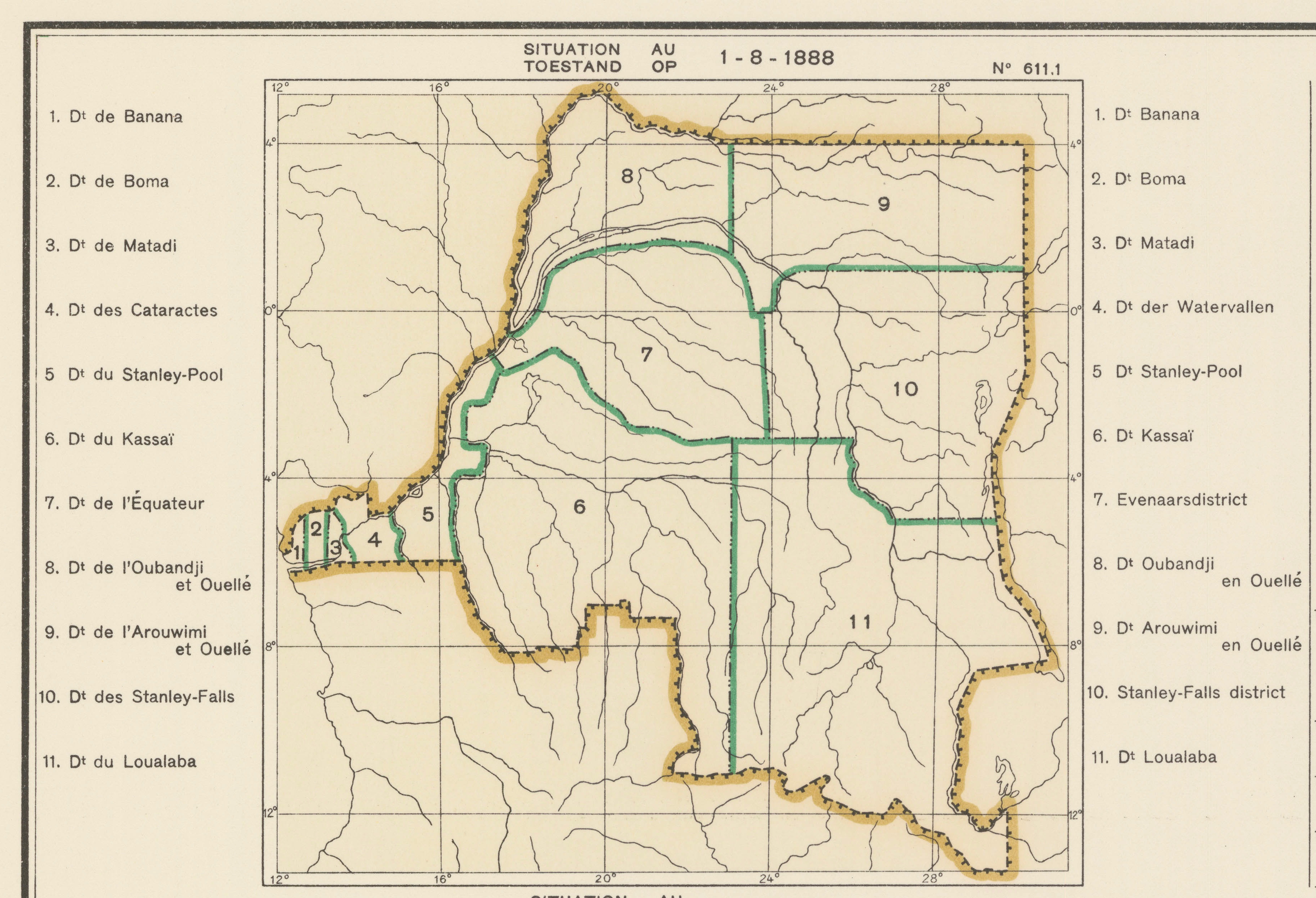
Districts of the Congo Free State in 1888. Lualaba in the southeast

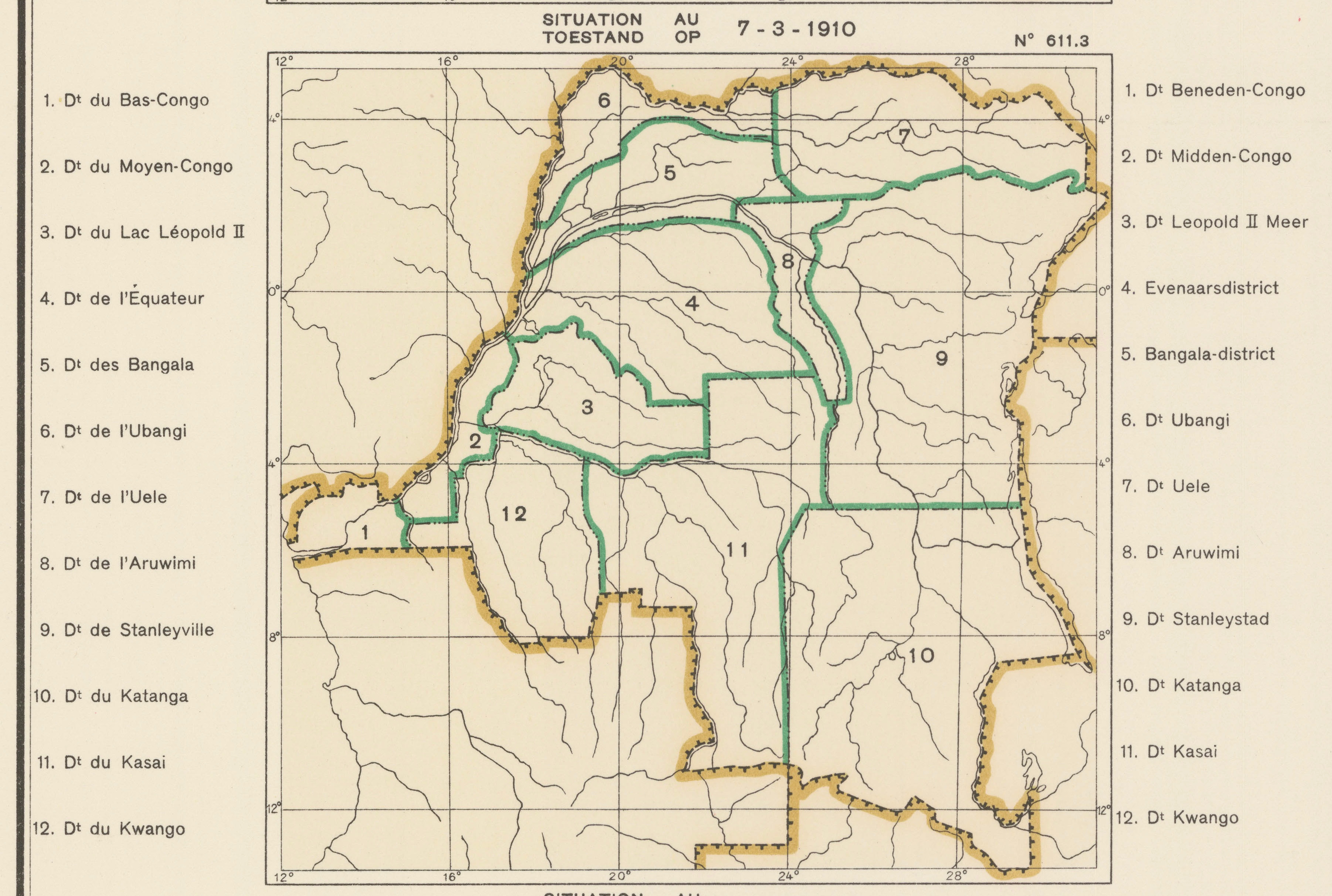
1910 districts. Lualaba replaced by Katanga

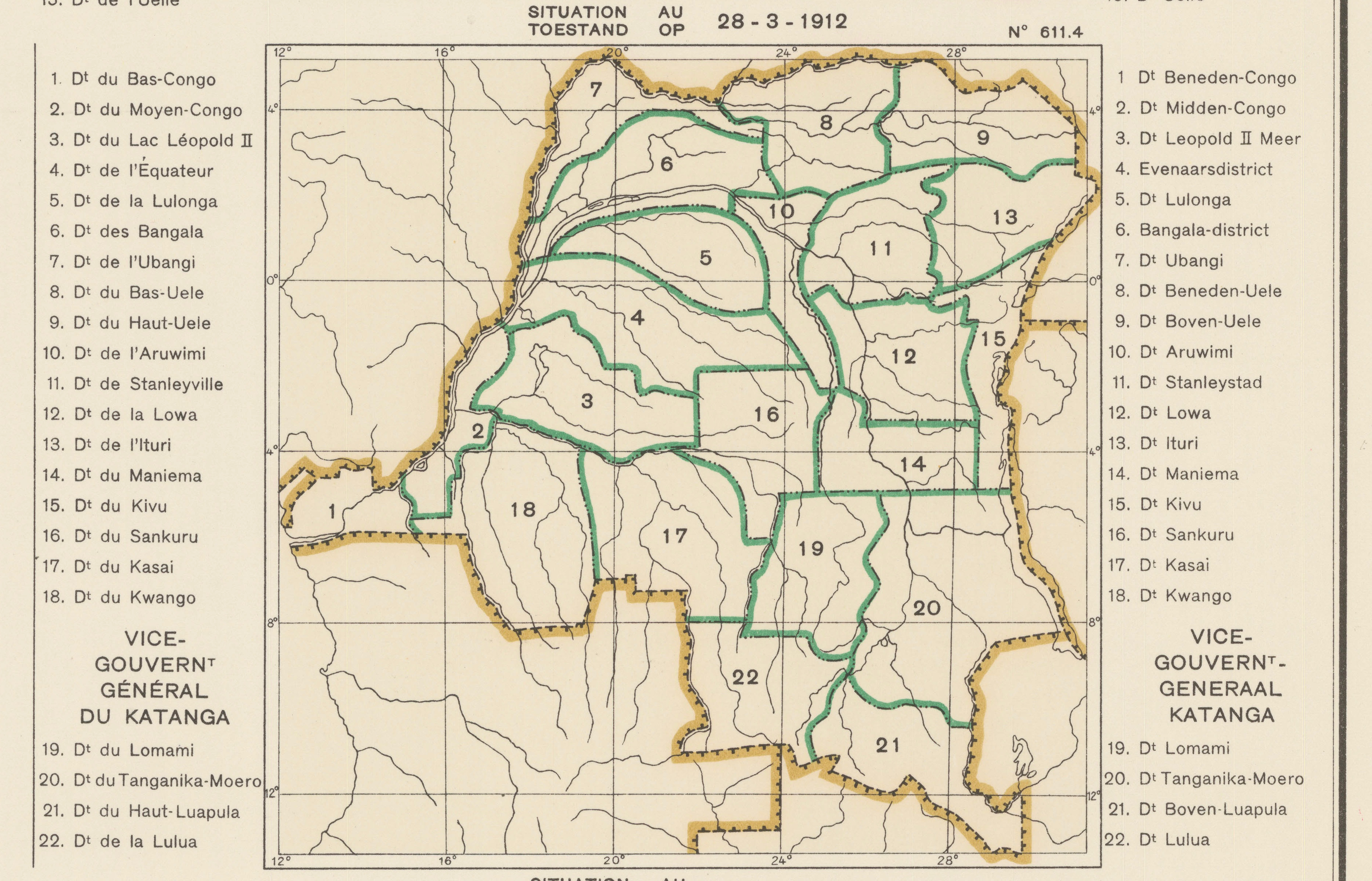
1912 provinces and districts. Katanga expanded to the west and divided into districts

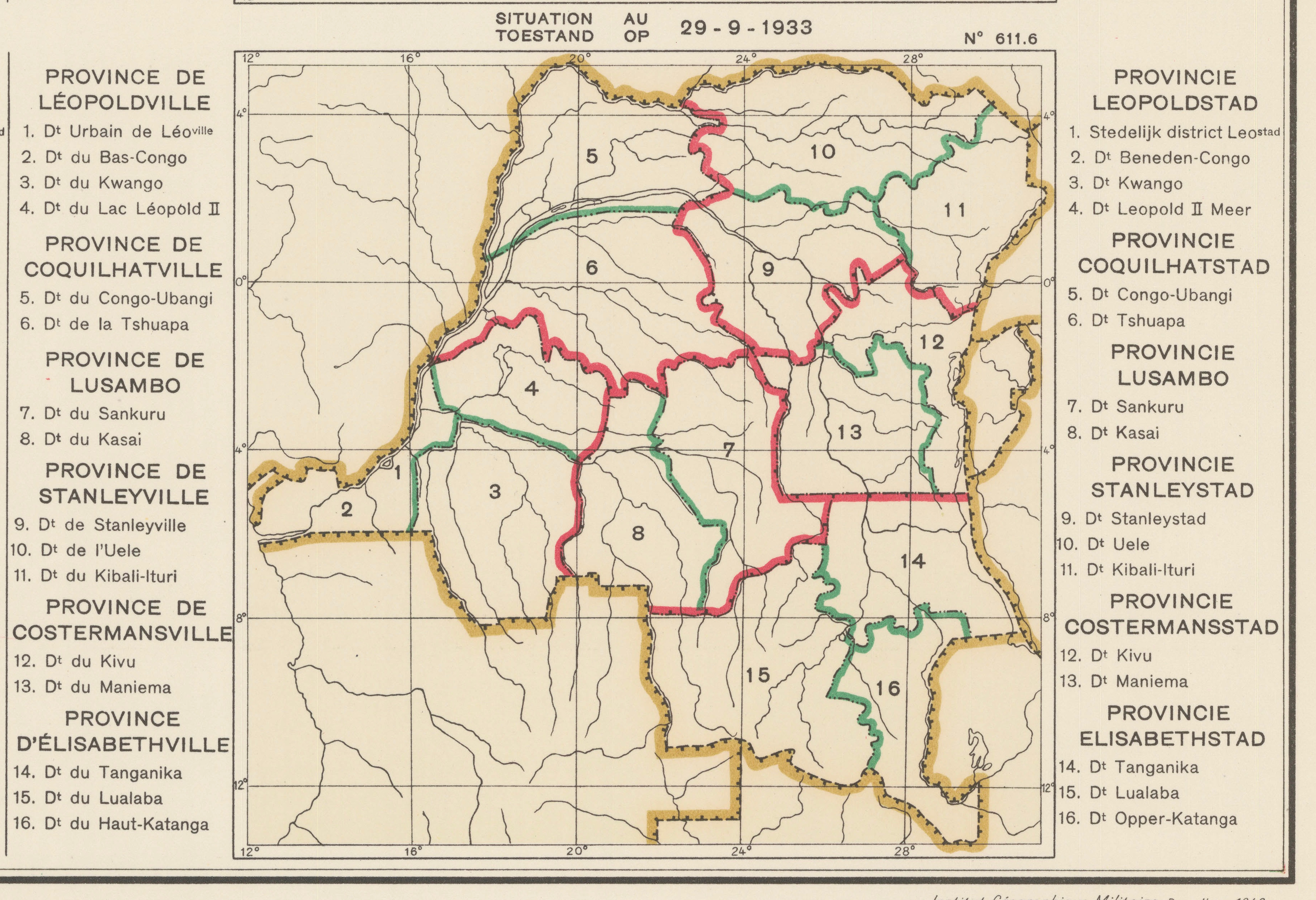
1933 provinces and districts. Lualaba in the west of Katanga
The current Lualaba Province

The current Haut-Lomami Province

== See also ==
- Districts of the Congo Free State
- Districts of the Belgian Congo
- Districts of the Democratic Republic of the Congo

== Sources ==
- Atlas général du Congo / Algemene atlas van Congo (in French and Dutch), Belgium: Institut Royal Colonial Belge, 1948–1963, OCLC 681334449
- Brass, William (8 December 2015), Demography of Tropical Africa, Princeton University Press, ISBN 978-1-4008-7714-0
- Bruneau, Jean-Claude (30 June 2009), "Les nouvelles provinces de la République Démocratique du Congo : construction territoriale et ethnicités", L'Espace Politique, 7 (2009–1), doi:10.4000/espacepolitique.1296
- "Congo (Kinshasa) Provinces", Rulers.org
- Higginson, John (1989), A Working Class in the Making: Belgian Colonial Labor Policy, Private Enterprise, and the African Mineworker, 1907-1951, Univ of Wisconsin Press, ISBN 978-0-299-12070-2
- Lemarchand, René (1964), Political Awakening in the Belgian Congo, University of California Press, GGKEY:TQ2J84FWCXN
- Omasombo Tshonda, Jean (2014), Bas-Uele, Musée royal de l’Afrique centrale, ISBN 978-9-4916-1586-3
