= Katanga insurgency =

Ongoing conflict in the Democratic Republic of the Congo

Katanga Insurgency
- Part of the Congo Crisis, First and Second Congo Wars, and other Congolese Civil Wars
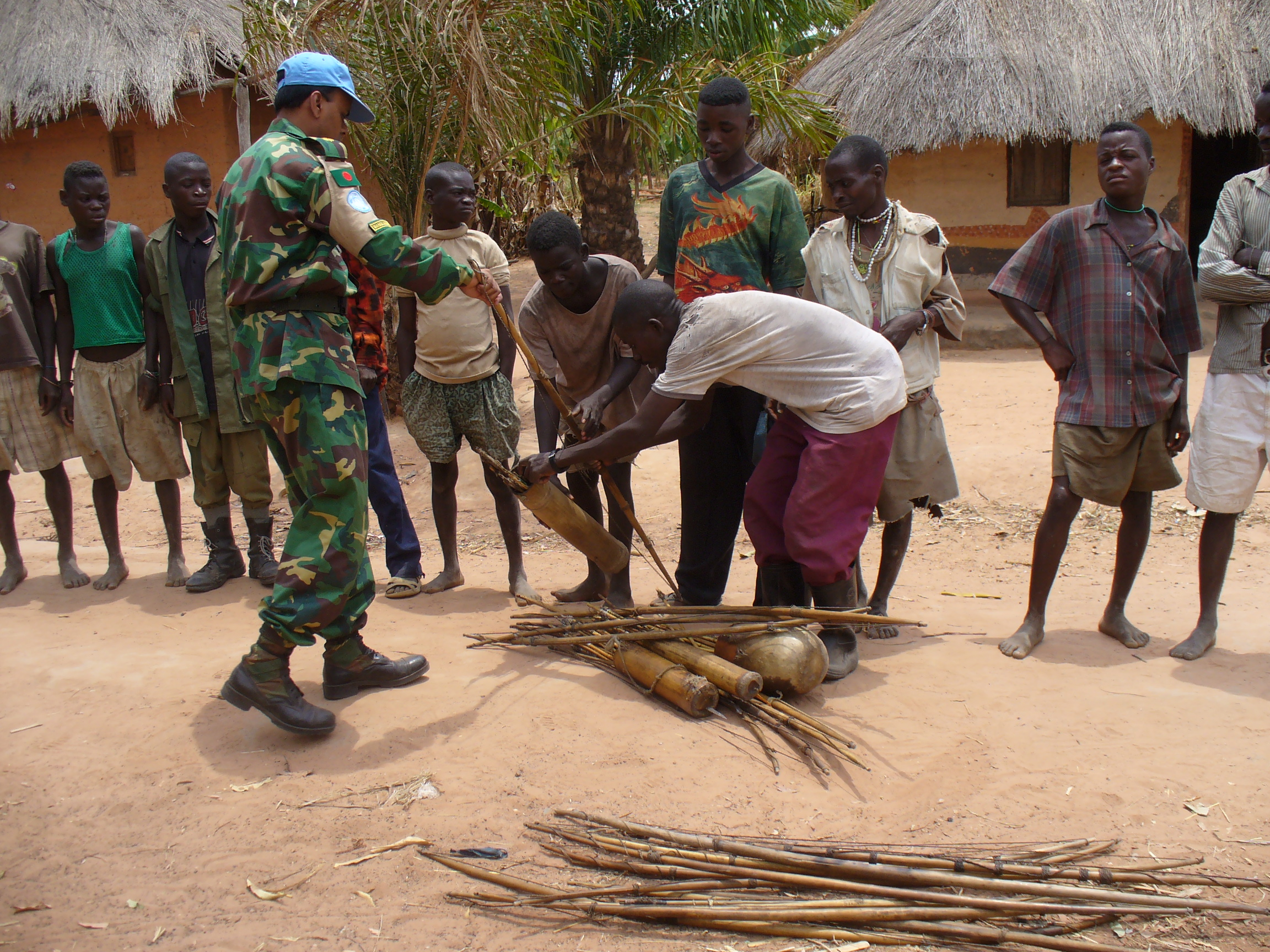
- Mai Mai militants surrendering in northern Katanga.
Date	1963 – present (63 years)
Location	Katanga, Democratic Republic of the Congo
Result	Ongoing

Belligerents
Congolese government: Congo-Léopoldville (until 1971); Zaire (1971–1997); DR Congo (from 1997); United Nations; ONUC (until 1964); MONUSCO (since 1999); Local self-defence groups	Katangese rebels: Katangese Gendarmerie (1960s); FLNC (1967–1991); Mai Mai Kata Katanga (since 2011); Mai Mai Gédéon; CORAK; CPK; MDKC (since 2026); Alleged Support: FARDC elements; Katangese businessmen; FDLR; Mai Mai Yakutumba; CNPSC

Commanders and leaders
Mobutu Sese Seko (until 1997); Joseph Kabila; Félix Tshisekedi; Jean Claude Kifwa; Pacifique Masunzu; Rombault Mbuayama; Eddy Kapend; Martin Kobler	Moïse Tshombe (POW) (until 1967); Nathaniel Mbumba (until 1990s); Gédéon Kyungu; Yesu Mulongo †; Fidel Ntumbi (POW); Sylvestre Mudacumura; Callixte Mbarushimana; Ignace Murwanashyaka

Strength
5,000–6,000 (2000s); 670 (2014); (Benin) 450; (Egypt) 100	6,000–7,000 (FLNC, 1977); 1,000–3,000 (2000s)

Casualties and losses
Unknown	Thousands killed
- 600,000 internally displaced persons, hundreds of thousands of excess deaths, hundreds of thousands of civilians killed

The Katanga insurgency is an ongoing rebellion by a number of rebel groups in the Democratic Republic of the Congo, some of which aim for the creation of a separate state within Katanga. While the insurgency has been active in various forms since 1963, insurgent groups have recently redoubled their efforts after the 2011 jail break that freed Gédéon Kyungu Mutanga, who commanded the majority of the Katangese separatist groups until his surrender to Congolese authorities in October 2016.

Since 2000, FDLR insurgents have been engaged in a low level military conflict with the FARDC and various Katangese separatist groups; the FDLR are mostly active in the north-eastern portion of Katanga province near the border with South Kivu. The conflict in the region has caused an exodus of around 600,000 refugees to various other parts of the DRC, and an unknown number of civilians have died as a result of the conflict.

== Background ==
A map of Katanga

Insurrection and political instability first appeared in Katanga immediately after the Republic of the Congo gained independence in 1960. The region attempted to break away with the support of Belgium, which aimed to create a puppet state and gain access to the mineral-rich region. The State of Katanga under self-proclaimed President Moïse Tshombe, however, failed to defend its independence during the Congo Crisis and was integrated into Congo following Operation Grandslam in 1963.

== Early insurgency ==
Following Operation Grandslam, the soldiers of Katanga's official military, the Katangese Gendarmerie, were supposed to be disarmed or integrated into the Armée Nationale Congolaise. However, many gendarmes instead went into hiding, occasionally clashing with government forces. Approximately 8,000 Katangese soldiers remained unaccounted for. Many gendarmes retreated into Northern Rhodesia, and Portuguese Angola. Considering them an asset, the Portuguese colonial authorities organized the gendarmes in Angola into "refugee" camps which were factually rebel training facilities. In 1964, Tshombe became Prime Minister of the Democratic Republic of the Congo, and promptly used the exiled gendarmes to combat the Simba rebellion. They consequently helped the stabilize the Congolese central government. However, Tshombe was ousted from power in 1965; soon after, Mobutu Sese Seko seized control in the Congo, eventually renaming the country to "Zaire". The gendarmes remained politically distant to Mobutu, and unsuccessfully mutinied in July 1966.

The gendarmes then retreated back into Angola, but Tshombe's plan to use them for an invasion ended when he was imprisoned in Algeria in 1967. The gendarmes reconstituted themselves as the Front for Congolese National Liberation (FLNC) in their Angolan exile. The FLNC made two attempts retake Katanga in 1977 and 1978 known as Shaba I and Shaba II, invading from their bases in Angola. Shaba I was initially quite successful, and the FLNC managed amass around 6,000 to 7,000 troops in Katanga. However, the rebels were repulsed after the Zairean government received international military support. The next invasion, Shaba II, resulted in the initial seizure of the important town of Kolwezi. The FLNC then organized a local militia and attempted to expand its holdings, but was again defeated due to an international intervention. A Franco-Belgian airborne force retook Kolwezi during Operation Léopard, ultimately forcing the FLNC to retreat back into Angola.

Despite the failure of the Shaba invasions, secessionist insurgency activity continued. By the 1990s, the ex-gendarmes and other Katangese militants had fractured into different factions. Some gendarmes opted to join forces with Mobutu, whereas others (nicknamed the "Katangese Tigers") continued to oppose him. Katangese groups consequently fought on both sides during the First Congo War (1996–1997) which resulted in Mobutu being overthrown.

== Later insurgency ==
A number of separatist groups have conducted a low intensity insurgency since the end of Shaba II, the main factions being the Coordination for the Organization of a Referendum on Self-Determination of Katanga (CORAK), the Mai Mai Kata Katanga, and the Congress of Peoples of Katanga (CPK).

=== 1998–2006 ===
When Rwanda began the Second Congo War by invading the DRC's Kivu region in 1998, President Laurent-Désiré Kabila began arming militias of Lubakat farmers to prevent an advance into Katanga. These became known as the Katangan Mai-Mai, and they were not among the groups involved in the 2002 peace accords that ended the war. At least a dozen Mai-Mai groups formed an alliance under Gédéon Kyungu. In November 2002, fighting broke out between government forces and Katangan Mai-Mai in Ankoro, which resulted in the deaths of at least 100 civilians and the displacement of 75,000 people. The fighting started after Mai-Mai fighters beat up a soldier of the Congolese Armed Forces (FAC). Troops then launched a retaliatory attack, burning and pillaging homes, which according to a human rights group killed 104 people and displaced 75,000. A government investigation concluded that 45 people were killed and 14,000 were displaced. President Joseph Kabila was criticized for being indifferent towards the allegations against FAC troops.

On 15 October 2004, rebels attacked the town of Kilwa, forcing approximately 3,000 civilians to flee into neighboring Zambia in the aftermath of the attack. The town was recaptured on 20 October 2004. Attempts to negotiate with the Mai-Mai groups by the provincial government and by President Joseph Kabila during 2004 and 2005 were unsuccessful, and in November 2005 the Armed Forces of the Democratic Republic of the Congo (FARDC) announced a 45-day operation against them. The campaign of the FARDC's 6th Military Region reportedly focused on a triangular area of central Katanga between the towns of Pweto, Manono, and Mitwaba. Fighting also occurred in Upemba National Park. There were over 100,000 displaced people in northern Katanga in January 2006, and researcher Jason Stearns compared the situation to the Ituri and Kivu conflicts. Gédéon Kyungu's forces controlled a refugee camp near Dubie in northeast Katanga before fleeing, and they were pursued by the army to Upemba National Park. The Mai-Mai groups remained a problem for security in Katanga until Gédéon Kyungu surrendered to the authorities along with 150 militiamen in May 2006.

=== 2010–2019 ===
On 23 May 2010, authorities apprehended 7 separatists belonging to CPK on charges of planning an attack on the Vangu military camp. Three AK-47 rifles, Katanga flags, as well as ritual fetishes were confiscated from the militants.

On 23 November 2010, militants raided a village situated in the vicinity of Luena.

On 26 November 2010, FARDC bombed rebel positions and engaged in clashes with insurgents in the area of Luena. A total of 6 people were killed, including 1 government soldier and 5 insurgents; 12 insurgents were also captured. Among those killed was rebel leader Yesu Mulongo.

On 11 January 2011, FARDC recaptured the towns of Bendera, Wimbi, Kabimba, and Lunga, previously controlled by FDLR. A total of 19 insurgents and 3 government soldiers were killed during the fighting.

On 5 February 2011, Katangese separatists seized control of the Luano airport in Lubumbashi but were forced out of the area by members of the FARDC and the local police. One death was reported and local sources indicated that the attack may have been done by the insurgent group CPK.

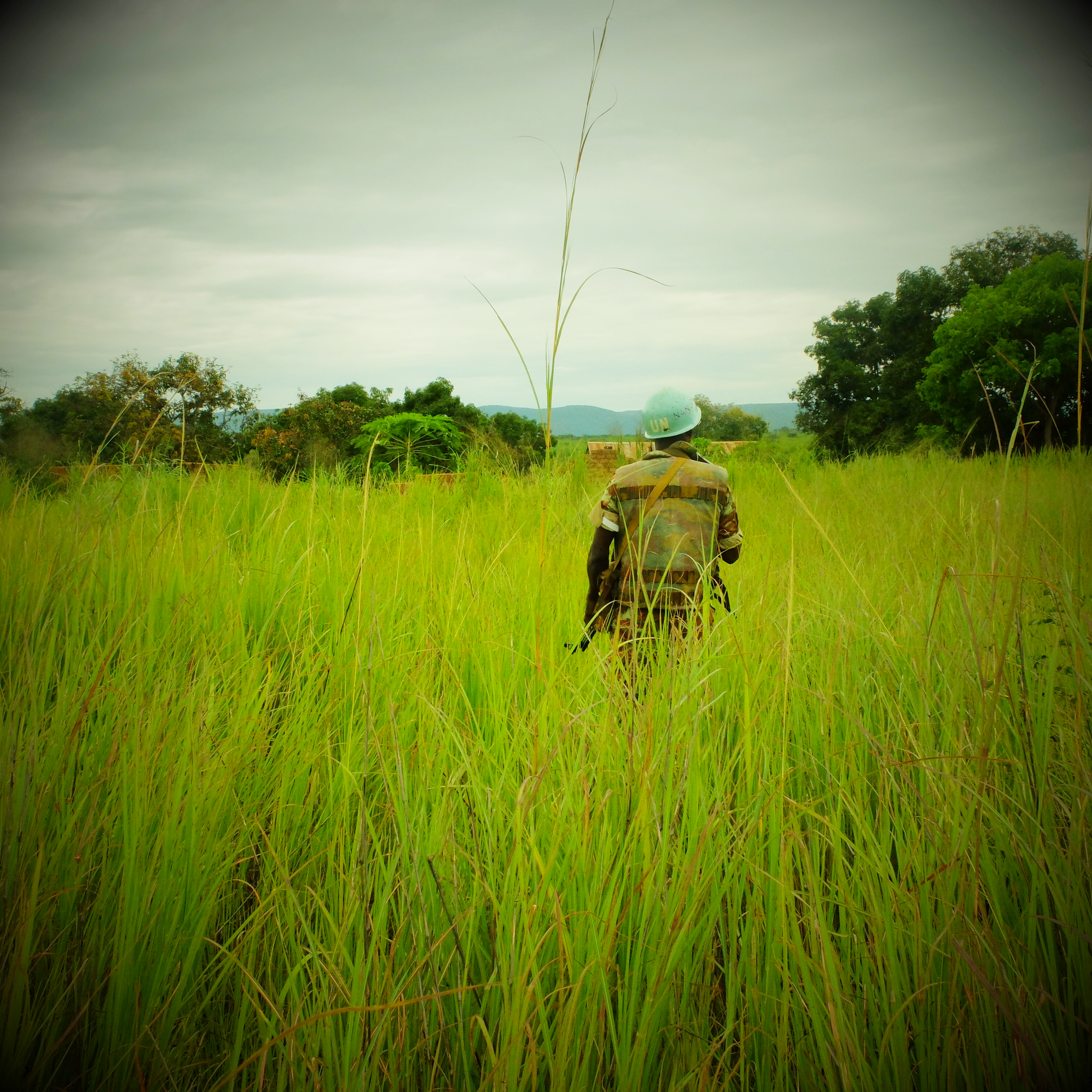
UN peacekeepers in action against Bakata Katanga in 2014

On the night of 11 July 2011, the anniversary of the secession of the State of Katanga in 1960, suspected CORAK militants attacked the Kimbembe military base, killing an unspecified number of people. Prior to the attack, on July 1, CORAK issued a statement calling for the independence of Katanga.

On 9 September 2011, rebel leader Gédéon Kyungu Mutanga managed to escape the Kassapa prison where he was detained. Mutanga soon established the Mai Mai Kata Katanga, a rebel faction aiming to create an independent Katanga state. Mutanga also established Mai Mai Gédéon, effectively having two separate militia groups under his command. These two militias primarily operate in the Mitwaba, Manono and Pweto localities of Katanga Province; an area that has been nicknamed the "Triangle of Death' as a result of the conflict.

On 27 November 2011, a weapons depot located in the Major Nvangu à Lubumbashi military camp was destroyed in the aftermath of an arson attack, killing one of the soldiers guarding the depot. A military spokesman accused CORAK of carrying the attack.

On 27 December 2011, trials of CORAK militants began at the Lubumbashi garrison military court; the defendants were accused of desertion and insurrection, among other charges. The accused included militants arrested during the February 2011 Luano airport attack and the Kassapa prison break. The next hearing was scheduled to be held on 6 January 2012.

On 21 December 2012, two insurgents and one government soldier were killed when rebels clashed with security forces outside Lubumbashi International Airport. Three militants were also captured. A few days before the incident, Angola-based insurgents issued statements indicating the possibility of imminent attacks.

Circa 1,410 people were killed in the Batwa-Luba clashes from 2013 to 2020, those clashes are caused by the violence perpetred by the Kata Katanga against civilians supported by Baluba ethnic group.

On 23 March 2013, between 300 and 350 Kata Katanga militia launched an unsuccessful attack on Lubumbashi, later fleeing into a United Nations compound to surrender; a total of 245 militants were detained. 35 people were killed and 60 were wounded during the clashes.

In August 2013, the UN mission in the Democratic Republic of the Congo, MONUSCO, rescued 82 children, some as young as eight, who had been forcibly recruited into Katanga militias as child soldiers. MONUSCO stated that a total of 163 children, including 22 girls, had been freed since the beginning of the year. The UN Office for the Coordination of Humanitarian Affairs said in a March 8 report that dire humanitarian impacts have spread to half of Katanga's 22 territories.

On 8 October 2013, rebel commander Albert “Yorgo” Kisimba surrendered to local authorities in Manomo. Three weeks earlier, Kisimba's family, along with 50 militants, had also capitulated at the same location.

According to DRC authorities, hundreds of Mai Mai militants deserted the movement during 2013.

It was reported that 35 attacks rebel attacks occurred within the first four months of 2014, occurring in the Katangese territories of Kalemie, Manono, Mitaba, Pweto, and Moba.

On 7 January 2014, Bakata Katanga separatists launched an attack on Lubumbashi, but the attack was repelled by security forces after a skirmish in Kiziba, southeast of Lubumbashi. A total of 26 people were killed during the clashes, as scores of civilians fled the city.

On 5 April 2014, FDLR guerrillas pillaged a number of villages and ambushed cargo trucks on Route Nationale 5, near Kabulo in Kalemie territory.

On 19 May 2014, Congolese authorities detained Kata Katanga commander Fidel Ntumbi in the town of Mpyana.

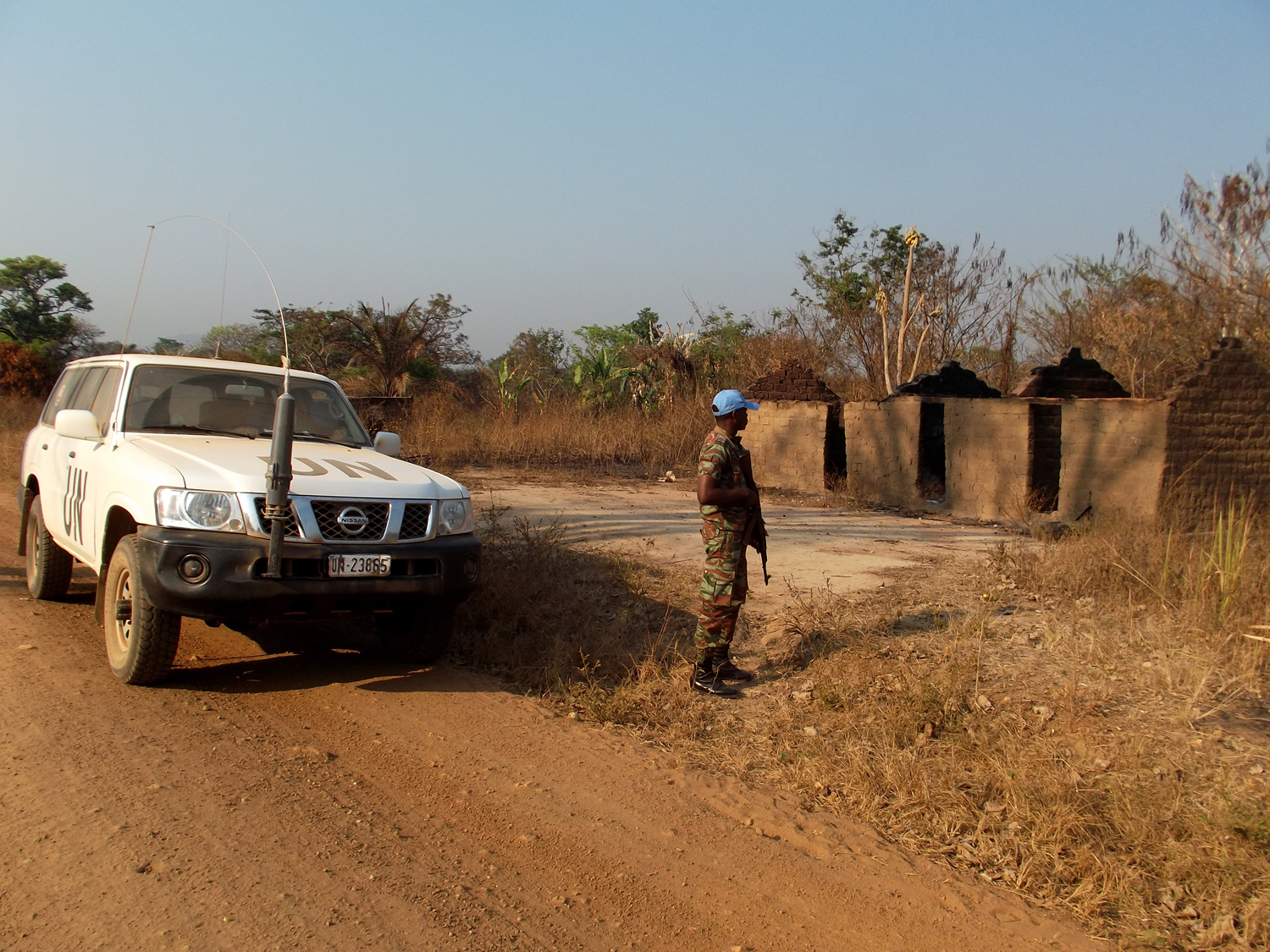
A member of the Beninese Contingent patrols Manono, following attacks by Maϊ - Maϊ rebels.

On 6 July 2014, the Congolese army recaptured the town of Wimbi, previously occupied by elements of Mai Mai Yakutumba, who had looted the town, stealing fuel, livestock and other material goods.

On 7 August 2014, FDLR rebels ambushed a bus outside the village of Kanyangwe, killing one and seriously injuring two people.

On 12 September 2014, a group of 10 militants shot dead a police officer along with his wife in the town of Malemba Nkulu, and the rebels then proceeded to plunder the town, later torching 10 houses and taking 3 people hostage.

On 16 September 2014, the Congolese military announced the take over of 11 towns previously controlled by Bakata Katanga rebels: Ndela, Kabunda, Kishale, Paza, Nkokole, Muluvia, Kabala, Lubinda, Lenge Wa Bangi, Lenge Wa Bunga, and Kyungu. Mai Mai Gédéon commander Kafilo was recognised among those killed during clashes that took place earlier in September.

On 26 September 2014, MONUSCO confirmed the death of Bakata Katanga commander Kasompobe, whose corpse was discovered on the shore of the Luvua River on September 12.

On 27 September 2014, 6 Bakata Katanga militants were killed during fighting in the vicinity of Kingoma. In a separate event, 2 Mai Mai Yakutumba insurgents were detained in the village of Manyanga. Several days earlier, FARDC killed and injured a number of Bakata Katanga separatists in the village of Kapanda, capturing two rifles and a large number of arrows.

Between 5–6 October 2014, Mai Mai militants burned 60 houses in Katuba, Kasamba Kilangwa, and Kanswa, forcing 3,000 civilians to flee into Dikulushi. At the same time, FARDC raided the central Mai Mai Gédéon headquarters located at Moba, freeing 13 hostages.

On 2 November 2014, Mai Mai Gédéon separatists launched simultaneous attacks on three villages in the region of Upemba.

On 4 November 2014, Bakata Katanga fighters ambushed two vehicles belonging to Upemba National Park rangers, taking four people hostage and seizing four rifles. At the same time, the rebel fighters launched an unsuccessful attack on a FARDC outpost in the village of Muvule.

On 7 November 2014, government troops captured the Mai Mai Gédéon headquarters located in Musumari, forcing the separatists to withdraw from the area after suffering heavy casualties. Four rifles and big stacks of arrows were also confiscated.

On 6 January 2015, FARDC arrested Jacques Mukashama (also known as Bwananyama). Mukashama led FDLR elements in the Northern part of Katanga province.

On 31 January 2015, FARDC commander in Katanga Jean Claude Kifwa announced that a total of 18 Kata Katanga fighters defected from the movement in the last quarter of 2014 following a successful propaganda campaign in the Pweto-Mitwaba-Manono triangle.

On 17 March 2015, Congolese authorities released a report regarding the Katanga insurgency, which indicated a decline in Mai Mai activity. The report noted that Kalenge, Bakwanga, Oto and Madrakua were considered to be the last Mai Mai commanders in the region, while also announcing the detention of Oto's wife.

On 11 October 2016, Gédéon Kyungu, the leader of the Mai Mai Kata Katanga and the Mai Mai Gédéon militias, as well as 100 of his fighters, surrendered themselves to Congolese authorities in Malambwe. The governor of the Haut-Katanga Province stated that the surrender was part of a series of negotiations seeking to end insecurity in Katanga and that the militiamen would enter a demobilization and rehabilitation program. Despite Gédéon Kyungu's surrender, Mai Mai Kata Katanga made several incursions into Lubumbashi in 2019. Three government soldiers and two rebels were killed during a confrontation in the city in October 2019.

=== 2020–present ===
In March 2020, his militia helped Gédéon Kyungu to escape from house arrest in Lubumbashi.

Attacks from 2020/1 (Lubumbashi), 2022 (Mitwaba) and 2023 (National Parks) had been concentrated in Haut-Katanga Province

On 25 September 2020, Mai Mai Kata Katanga launched an incursion into central Lubumbashi, clashing with the Congolese military and the police. More than a dozen Mai Mai were killed in the violence as they attempted to seize strategic public buildings. Two policemen and a soldier were also killed. On 14 February 2021, Mai Mai Kata Katanga attacked two FARDC camps in Lubumbashi, namely Kimbembe and Kibati. In the resulting violence, four members of DRC security forces, one policeman, and six rebels were killed. Though a spokesman for FARDC stated that the army had successfully halted the rebel advance on the town, the complete operation to clear the rebels from the town and surrounding areas could take several days because the rebels had disguised themselves by mixing in with the local civilian population. Three commanders and 169 Mai Mai Bakata Katanga militants surrendered to the government at Mpyana sector in Manono in November 2021.

On 29 January 2022, about 100 Mai Mai Kata Katanga fighters under Gédéon captured the settlement of Mitwaba in Mitwaba Territory; the rebels used the opportunity to once more declare the intention to restore Katanga's independence. They retreated from the area before security forces could respond effectively. FARDC claimed that some rebels had surrendered as the remainder withdrew. By December 2022, Gédéon was reportedly still in Mitwaba Territory. At this point, Haut-Katanga Province's council of ministers still considered his militia a significant threat, though the level of violence in the region had generally decreased. In January 2023, the FARDC targeted Mai Mai Kata Katanga forces which were hiding in the Kundelungu and Upemba National Parks.

In January 2024, a group of 40 Mai Mai Kata Katanga fighters stormed the police station in Luena, Bukama Territory, raising the Katangese flag and demanding the release of a milita member arrested at the location. However, the local policemen were able to easily repel the raid with some reinforcements. In May, the group attacked a FARDC battalion at Lutandula in the Lufira Biosphere Reserve, killing one soldier and a National Service agent as well as capturing some loot before retreating. On 15 August, ten people were killed in Kilwa, Pweto Territory, during a disputed incident; the FARDC claimed that it had repelled a separatist raid, but locals stated that the soldiers had shot civilians of the Mbidi sect due to mistaking them for insurgents. From 7 to 8 December, 80 Mai Mai Kata Katanga militants raided the village of Kapando, Bukama Territory, where they killed two civilians and stole 500,000 Congolese francs. Later that month, Mai Mai Kata Katanga attacked four villages and burned over 50 houses in Moba Territory, causing around 4,000 civilians to flee. Soon after, Eddy Kapend -commander of the local 22nd military region- called on the separatist rebels to surrender, threatening that he was increasing FARDC operations in response to the recent attacks. On 3 March 2025, a clash between FARDC and an allied force of Mai Mai Kata Katanga and Twa militants took place at Kamena, Nganié Chiefdom, Moba Territory. The military claimed that it fended off the attack and killed three rebels.

On 11 January 2026, Mai Mai Kata Katanga attacked a FARDC position at Bukama town, reportedly resulting in 13 deaths. On 3 March 2026, a combined force of Mai Mai Kata Katanga and a new rebel group named Mouvement Debout Katanga pour la Liberation du Congo ("Stand Up Katanga Movement for the Liberation of Congo", MDKC) launched a raid on Lusinga in Upemba National Park, killing two local park rangers and five civilians. The MDKC subsequently called for the overthrow of the DRC government, while the FARDC responded by launching counterinsurgency sweeps in the region. At some point in March, the MDKC also temporarily occupied Nkonga village.

On 27 September 2026, Mai Mai Kata Katanga carried out another attack at Kamena, reportedly resulting in the deaths of one insurgent and two FARDC soldiers.

== See also ==
- Mai Mai
- Congo Crisis
