= Kisula Ngoy =

Congolese politician and doctor

Governor of Katanga
- In office May 16, 2004 – 2007
- President: Joseph Kabila
- Preceded by: Aimé Ngoy Mukena
- Succeeded by: Moïse Katumbi

Personal details
- Born: Urbain Kisula Ngoy; November 18, 1940
- Died: October 22, 2018 (aged 77) South Africa
- Cause of death: Illness
- Party: Union of Federalists and Independent Republicans (?—?); People's Party for Reconstruction and Democracy(?—death)
- Profession: Politician, doctor

Dr. Urbain Kisula Ngoy (1940—2018) was a Congolese politician and doctor who served as governor of the Katanga Province, Democratic Republic of the Congo, from 2004 to 2007. During his time in office, he sought to end the Mai-Mai's abuse of Katanga.

== Biography ==
Kisula was born on 18 November 1940. He is Mulubà and a descendant of King Kasongo wa Nyembo of Luba.

== Career ==
=== Medical career ===
Kisula was a doctor for Gécamines prior to becoming a politician.

=== Political career ===
In his early years as a politician, Kisula was aligned with the Union of Federalists and Independent Republicans before joining President Joseph Kabila's People's Party for Reconstruction and Democracy (PPRD). He was appointed governor of Katanga by President Kabila on May 16, 2004. In lieu of giving the Mai-Mai political power of their own, Ngoy was considered their representative, as per Kabila; the militia denied that he represented that.

==== Relations with the Mai-Mai ====
Shortly after assuming office, Kisula organized a round table between his administration, "traditional chiefs from the north," and members of the Mai-Mai, who had been terrorizing Katanga for several years. Many sent representatives in their place in case Kisula intended to arrest them. Relations continued to break down, however, as Kisula denied the Mai-Mai's requests for resources and resolutions created at the round table were not realized. Kisula did, however, largely avoid using military intervention to suppress the militia and believed that a soldier without resources would turn against the government.

==== Kilwa massacre ====
In October 2004, a rebel group attempted to occupy the town of Kilwa; they communicated directly with Anvil Mining to assure the company that they were not intending to seize control of their Dikulushi Mine. Townspeople fled, many to the island of Nshimba, and those that remained were victims of a number of human rights violations and executions carried out by the 62nd Infantry Brigade of the Congolese Armed Forces (FARDC). After bringing down the threat, the FARDC spent two days systematically searching houses; meanwhile, Anvil Mining returned to the area to resume mining. Three days after the attack, Kisula, along with Augustin Katumba Mwanke (presidential advisor and Anvil Mining board member) and General Dieugentil Alengbia Nzambe, went to Nshimba to tell Kilwa refugees they could return home. Despite the townspeople being assured that Kilwa was safe, the FARDC remained in the area for nine months after the attack, intimidating and threatening families, particularly of those who had been executed.

Human rights organizations pushed for accountability and in July of the following year, the province's chapter of the African Association for the Defence of Human Rights (ASADHO/Katanga) was threatened by Donatien Nyembo Kimuni, spokesperson for Kisula's administration, for criticizing Anvil Mining and accused them of attempting to drive Katanga into poverty by cutting off ore trading. Several days later, Col. Ilunga Ademar, who led the FARDC during the attack, was arrested and charged with war crimes during the Kilwa operation. A protest, authorized by Kisula, ensued in Lubumbashi and stormed the ASADHO/Katanga offices. Police failed to respond to calls for help from ASADHO/Katanga staff. In August, a letter written in June from Kisula to Anvil Mining's general manager surfaced; it showed Kisula had requested the company assist the FARDC with "logistical support". In September, Kisula encouraged local human rights organizations, including ASADHO/Katanga, they should support mining companies instead of attempting to discourage investment in the province's biggest source of income. Kisula was not called as a witness in the Kilwa court trial, which commenced in December 2006, nearly three years after the attack.

==== Mining ====
Because of its rich copper, cobalt, and gold mining, Katanga has long been the target of mining privatization and politicization and other resource-hoarding attempts. Kisula spoke in defense of companies such as Anvil Mining and Gécamines and criticized the central government for not enforcing laws, including keeping miners away from closed mines like the Shinkolobwe mine. He also accused the central government of damaging business for the SNCC, whose main work is transporting ore by railroad, by allowing private companies to use trucks. Kisula called on financial support and intervention from foreign nations to help navigate the crisis and to re-industrialize.

== Death ==
Kisula died 18 November 2018 in South Africa after an illness.
