= Pweto Territory =

Pweto Wilaya ya Pweto (Swahili)
- Territory
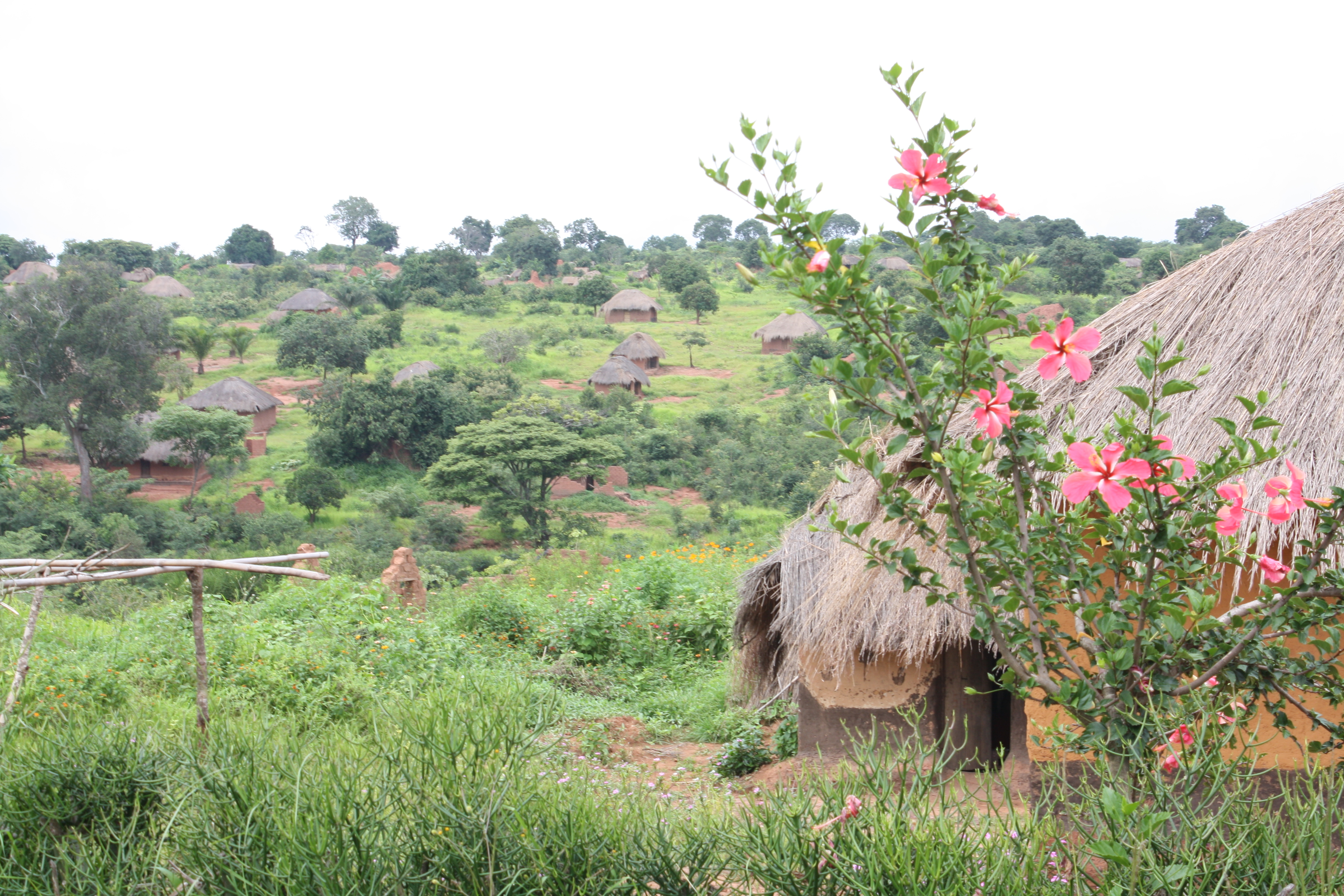
- Houses along the road from Pweto to Dubie, Katanga
- Interactive map of Pweto
- Coordinates: 8.46667°S 28.9°E
- Country: DR Congo
- Province: Haut-Katanga Province

Area
  - Total: 22,673 km^{2} (8,754 sq mi)

Population (2020)
  - Total: 765,800
  - Density: 33.78/km^{2} (87.48/sq mi)
- Time zone: UTC+2 (CAT)

Pweto Territory is a territory in the Haut-Katanga Province of the Democratic Republic of the Congo (DRC). The headquarters are in the town of Pweto.

== History ==
Pweto Territory saw several combats during the Congo wars. With the cease fire, the front line between the RCD-Goma and the Forces Armées Congolaise cut off the north of Pweto from the south. Although the civil war ended in 2003, the region has been severely damaged by the civil war and reconstruction has been slow. Most of the rural residents are returned refugees or internally displaced people from other regions. Basic government services are still not available, public infrastructure is in poor condition and the local economy is scarcely functional. Corruption and lack of confidence in stability are handicaps to investment.

The forests of Pweto territory were once home to thousands of pygmies, locally called Batembo, but only a few hundred families are left. Many of them fled or were killed by the Mai-Mai Kata Katanga militia of Gédéon Kyungu Mutanga between 2003 and 2006. Mutanga was later sentenced to death for of crimes against humanity, insurgency, and terrorism. The pygmies, many of whom have moved to towns and villages for greater security, are marginalized, subject to prejudice and discrimination.

A 2007 report said there was no longer any significant presence of Mai-Mai fighters in the territory, but one of the two remaining full FARDC brigades in Katanga was stationed in Pweto Territory. This brigade, the 62nd, had a reputation for harassing civilians and had been implicated in illegally exploiting the Cassiterite mine in Kapulo. The soldiers were said to engage in extortion, illegal taxation, forced labour, theft, torture and humiliation of civilians.

On 15 August 2024, ten people were killed in Kilwa, Pweto Territory, during a disputed incident. According to the FARDC, Mai-Mai Kata Katanga rebels had attacked local security forces who then repelled and killed several of them. In contrast, locals stated that the soldiers had interpreted songs by the Mbidi sect for Mai-Mai Kata Katanga chants, causing the security forces to shoot civilians due to mistaking them for insurgents.

== Geography ==
Pweto is part of Haut-Katanga Province. It lies to the west and north of Lake Mweru on the border with Zambia. The Luvua River, a headstream of the Congo River, leaves the lake just west of the town of Pwetu to flow north its confluence with the Lualaba River opposite the town of Ankoro. Other rivers flowing through the territory include the Lubule River, the Lumekele River and the Kilulishi River. The territory is subdivided into the following chiefdoms and sectors: Kiona-Nzini Chiefdom, Moero Sector, Mwenge Sector and Pweto Chiefdom

== Economy ==
The territory is agriculturally productive and the lake is rich in fish. There is no formal industry apart from the Dikulushi Mine near Kilwa, the capital of Moero Sector, operated by Anvil Mining, an Australian company. There is informal mining in other areas, including cassiterite pits at the village of Kapulo. The ore is exported through Zambia, bypassing customs posts.

== Gallery ==
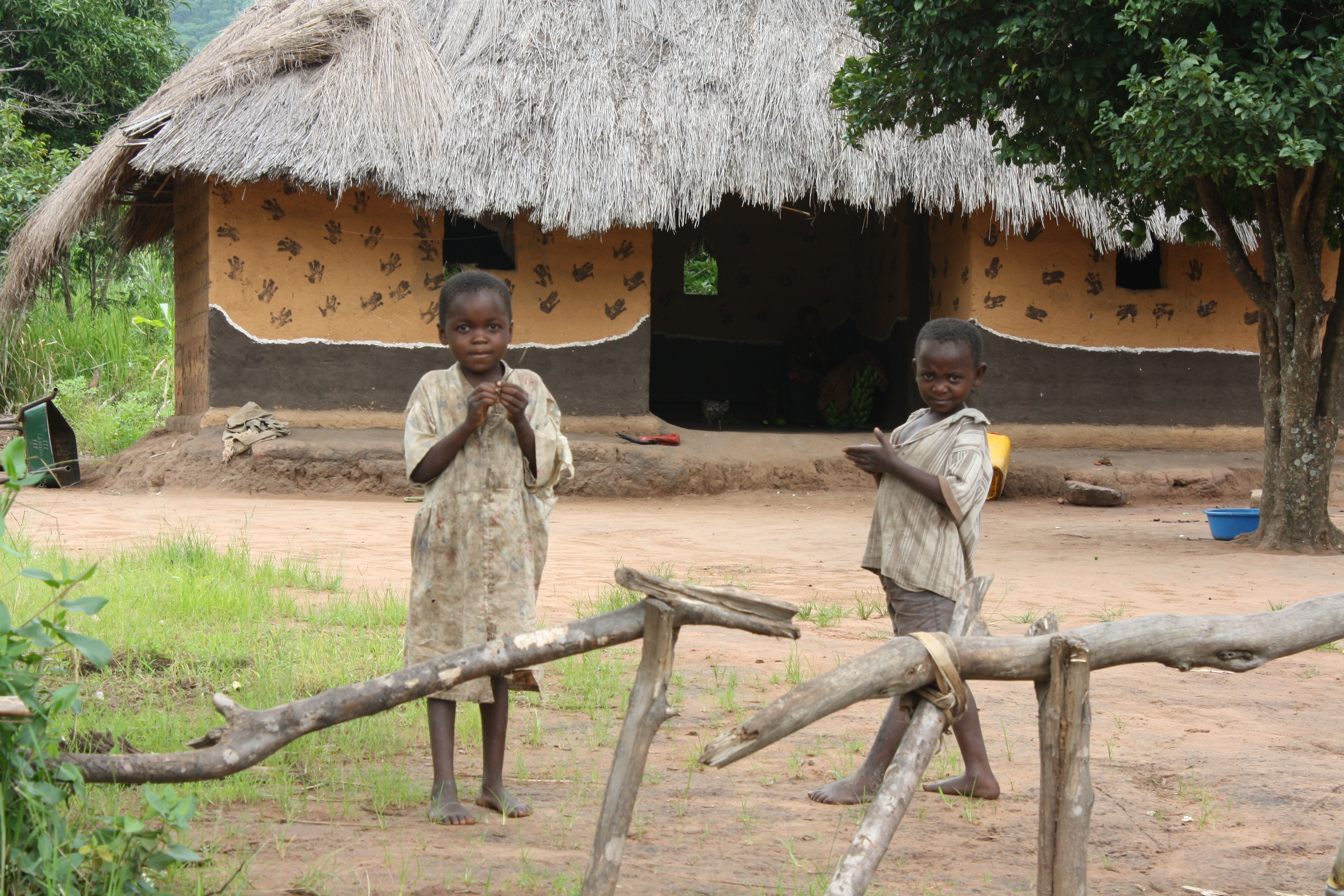
Children outside a house on the road from Pweto to Dubie

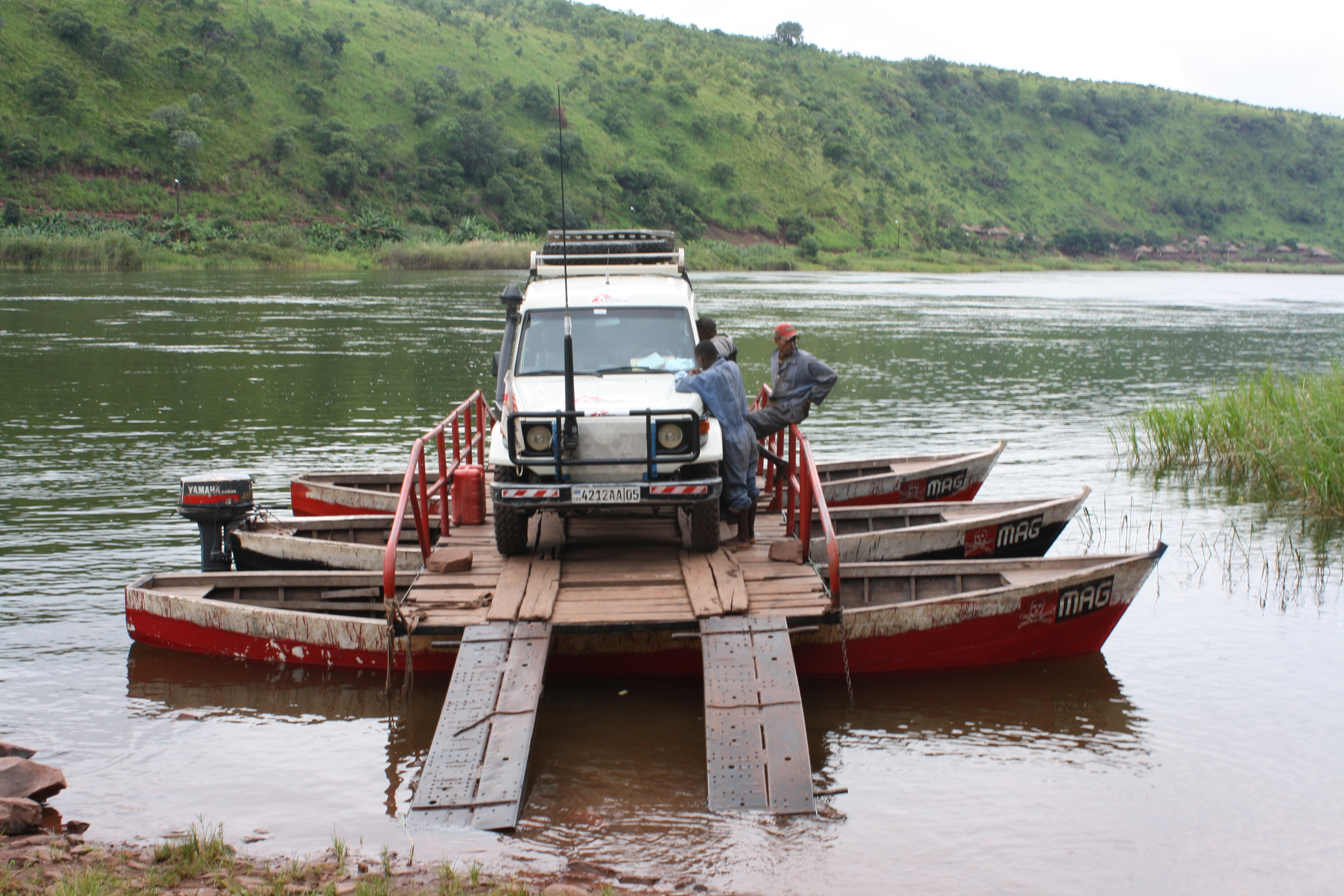
Car being ferried across the Luvua River near Pweto
