= Pepa, Democratic Republic of the Congo =

Pepa
- Location within Democratic Republic of the Congo
- Coordinates: 7.710609°S 29.775953°E
- Country: DR Congo
- Province: Tanganyika
- Territory: Moba

Population (2010)
  - Total: 24,767
- Time zone: UTC+2 (CAT)
- Climate: Cwb
- National language: Swahili

Pepa is a community in the southeast of Tanganyika province of the Democratic Republic of the Congo. It is located 167 kilometres northeast by road from Pweto, to the west of Lake Tanganyika.

== Location ==
Pepa is in Moba territory in the southeast of Tanganyika province. The village is surrounded by high plateau grasslands. It was the home of the Belgian-owned Societé Elgima Pepa until the 1990s, a huge cattle farm that employed 1,200 local people.

== War ==
During the Second Congo War (1998-2003) the region became a battle zone between government forces and rebel groups. Most of the people fled to Zambia and almost all the cattle were taken. The area between Pweto, Moba and Moliro has been called the "Triangle of Death". In 2000 the town was held by RCD-Goma forces and the Rwandan Patriotic Army (RPA). In April 2000 a Rwandan airforce Antonov An-8 crashed on take-off from the Pepa airstrip killing the crew of four and about 20 Rwandan soldiers including a Rwanda army major, two captains and two lieutenants. Other reports place the death toll as high as 57.

In October 2000 Pepa was captured in an offensive by DRC government troops and their allies. The RCD-Goma and RPA forces counter-attacked and recaptured Pepa in November 2000.

In October 2000, 10 000 AFDL troops (including Hutu, and Zimbabwean) assaulted at Mutoko Moya (west of Pepa) against 3000 Rwanda/Burundi/RCD forces, forcing them to retreat to Pepa. Zimbabwe Air Force bombers were used. 6000 RCD reinforcements crossed from Burundi across the lake to counterattack. For two days, and hundreds of casualties, there was no result. Then a light battalion was sent on a long outflanking manoeuver, which led to success. The AFDL retreated to Pweto. The Rwandans took other places in the area including Pweto and Moba early in December 2000. By the end of the war buildings that had been used by the military were dilapidated and the community was littered with unexploded and abandoned ordnance.

Pepa was an old Belgian commercial farm, in 2010 there were 200 cows left. Pepa changed hands three times in 2000, during the Second Congolese War. The Mai-Mai finally occupied Pepa from 2003 until a village strike (collectively refused to work for them) forced them to leave, in 2006.

== Today ==
About 4,000 people trickled back to Pepa after the war, where aid workers educated them in avoiding the dangers of mines and other explosives. By 2010 the herd of cattle numbered 270 and was steadily growing.
