= Pweto =

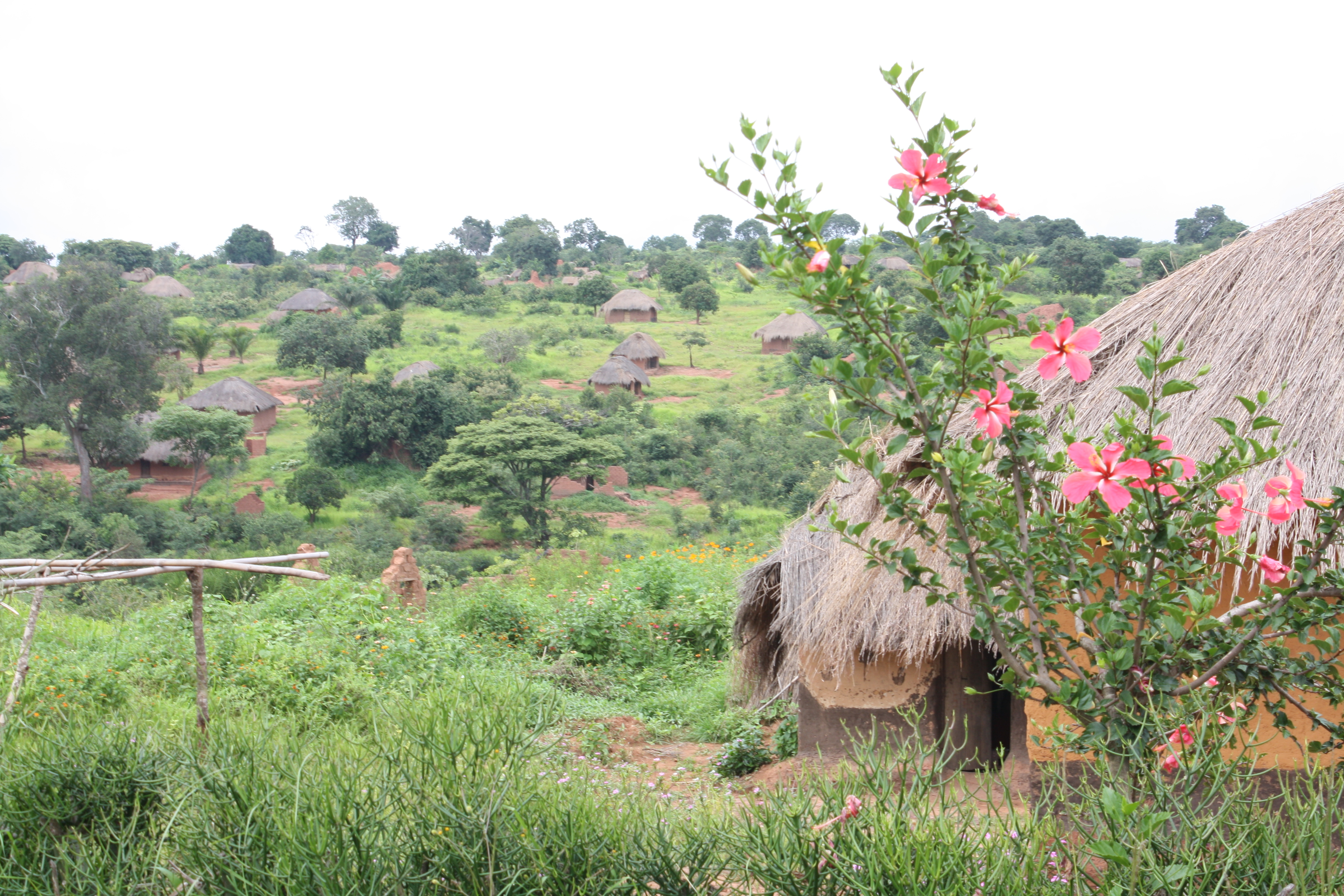
- Houses along the road from Pweto to Dubie, Katanga

- Location within Democratic Republic of the Congo
- Coordinates: 8.46667°S 28.9°E
- Country: Democratic Republic of the Congo
- Province: Haut-Katanga Province
- Territory: Pweto Territory

Population (2010)
  - Total: 24,767
- Climate: Aw
- National language: Swahili

Pweto is a town in the Haut-Katanga Province of the Democratic Republic of the Congo (DRC). It is the administrative center of Pweto Territory. The town was the scene of a decisive battle in December 2000 during the Second Congo War which resulted in both sides making more active efforts to achieve peace. Pweto and the surrounding region were devastated during the war. As of 2011 little had been done to restore infrastructure or rebuild the economy. The town is served by Pweto Airport.

== Location ==
Pweto lies at the north end of Lake Mweru 8 km west from the border with Zambia. The Luvua River, a headstream of the Congo River, leaves the lake just west of Pweto to flow north to its confluence with the Lualaba River opposite the town of Ankoro. Where the Luvua exits the lake it runs through a series of violent rapids, falling several meters from the lake level. The Mitumba mountains rise to the west, forming a giant barrier between the lake and the Congo Basin broken by the Luvua valley. A fertile plain stretches to the north and east.

Rainfall over the lake averages around 1,080 millimetres (43 in) annually, with the most rain in December. The average annual temperature is around 23 °C (73 °F). October is the warmest month with daily maxima up to 34 °C (93 °F), while July is the coolest with mean temperature of 20 °C (68 °F). The lake has abundant and diverse fish, the most important economically being Oreochromis macrochir, and fishing is an important part of the economy. The local people also practice small-scale agriculture, growing cassava, millet, maize, groundnuts and sweet potatoes.

The Belgian and British colonial governments agreed that the border between the Belgian Congo and Northern Rhodesia (now Zambia), ran from the point where the Luvua leaves the lake in a straight line running eastward to a point on the shore of Lake Tanganyika. This has the effect of technically placing the shoreline of the town in Zambian territory.

== Second Congo War ==
The Battle of Pweto in December 2000 was one of the major engagements of the Second Congo War (1998-2003). It followed an offensive in northeastern Katanga by DRC government troops with Interahamwe fighters and former Rwandan army troops now fighting for the DRC government. They were assisted by Burundi FDD, local Mayi Mayi militias and Namibian Angolan troops and Zimbabwean troops. They captured positions held by the Congolese Rally for Democracy-Goma (RCD-Goma), such as Pepa, and attacked Moba port on Lake Tanganyika. The Rwandan government protested against this violation of the cease fire agreement. The RCD-Goma and Rwandan Patriotic Army (RPA) forces counter-attacked early in December 2000.

The population of Pweto had tripled due to civilians fleeing from fighting elsewhere in Katanga, overwhelming health care facilities. Since the start of 2000 there had been 1,800 cases of cholera, with 150 deaths from the disease. Rwandan forces advancing from the north attacked the town, and the government forces suffered a crushing defeat. The government leaders included General John Numbi and the young General Joseph Kabila, soon to become President, who escaped by air. The defeat potentially opened the way for an advance on the major city of Lubumbashi to the south. The Rwandans were able to seize a large weapons stockpile. Some 3,000 government soldiers escaped across the border into Zambia, as well as 60,000 civilians.

Pweto was the forward base for AFDL (including Genl Joseph Kabila, son of President and commander of AFDL army). In October 2000. The AFDL advance was reversed in Pepa, resulting in a three-week retreat, to Pweto. Panic caused the only ferry across the Luvua River to be sunk by a misloaded T62 tank. Senior officers fled to Zambia. Thirty three vehicles (tanks, armoured personnel carriers, trucks, ambulance) were burnt to avoid capture.

The fall of Pweto led to the assassination of President Laurent-Désiré Kabila by his bodyguards, on 18 January 2001, and to a complete shift in the political situation on both sides. The Rwandans chose not to pursue the Congolese forces into Zambia since President Paul Kagame was concerned about further alienating international supporters. He was given a cold reception when he visited Washington. In February 2001 the Rwandan Patriotic Army started to withdraw from Pweto. The Rwandan Chief of Operations, Colonel Karaka Karenze, said about 3,000 Rwandans were leaving Pweto. He said "This is generally in support of the peace process, but is also a goodwill gesture which we hope will bring an appropriate response from the government in Kinshasa".

During the wind-down of the Second Congo War, United Nations Security Council Resolution 1399 was adopted unanimously on March 19, 2002. Stressing that no party would be allowed to make military gains during the peace process, the UN demanded that the RCD-Goma immediately withdraw from Moliro and Pweto and for all other parties to withdraw to defensive positions called for in the Harare disengagement sub-plans. On 21 June 2002, child soldiers of the pro-government Mai Mai militia entered the town, and RDC officials hastily left. Later that month the Rwandan-backed RDC-Goma forces again took control of Pweto, threatening the peace agreement under which Pweto was declared a demilitarized zone.

== Pweto today ==
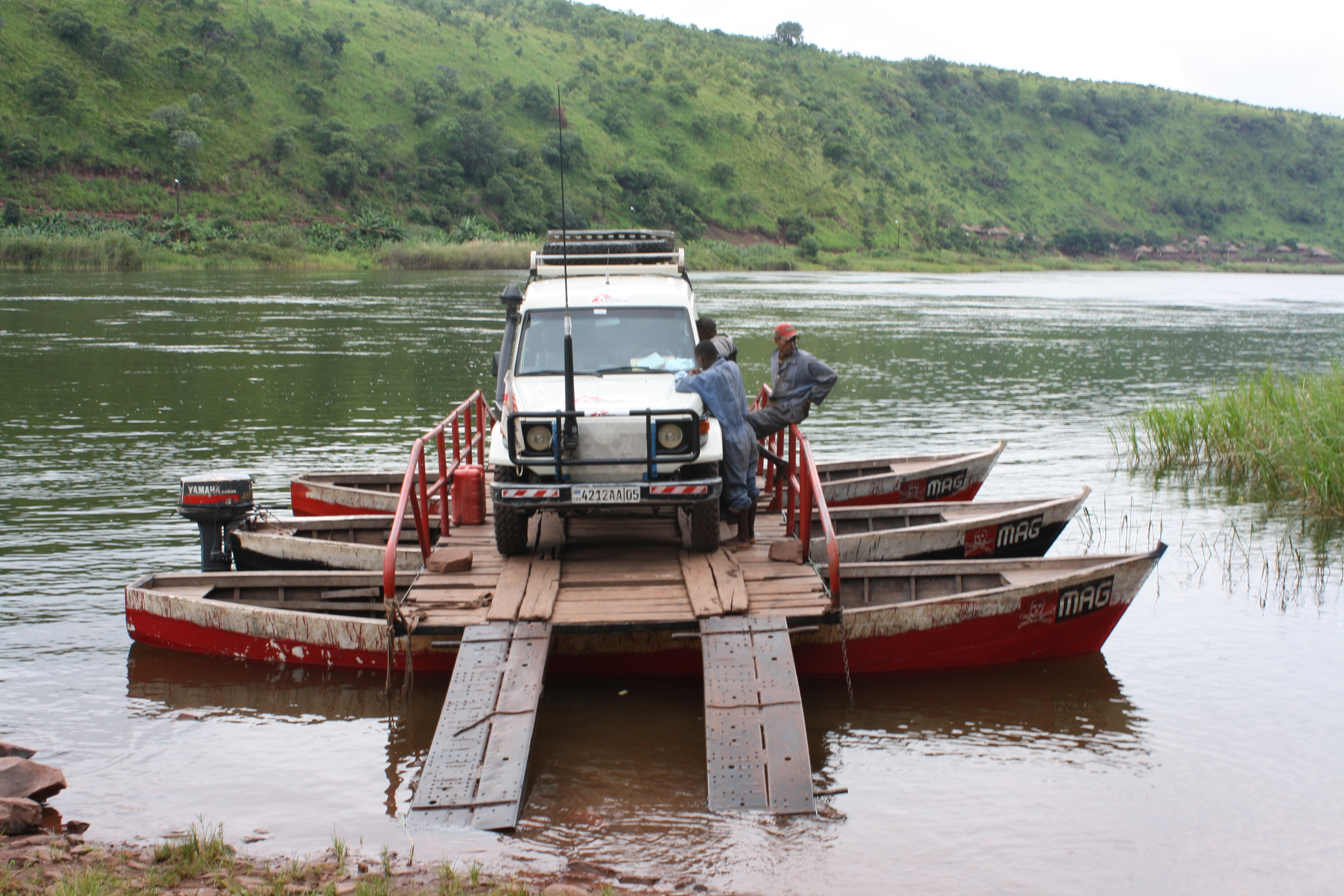
Car being ferried across the Luvua River near Pweto

Pweto is the largest town between Moliro on the shore of Lake Tanganyika and the Katangan provincial capital Lubumbashi. As of 2010 the population of Pweto was estimated at 24,767. Although the civil war ended in 2003, the region has been severely damaged by the civil war and reconstruction has been slow. Basic government services are still not available, public infrastructure is in poor condition and the local economy is scarcely functional. Corruption and lack of confidence in stability are handicaps to investment.

In June 2011 a fight broke out between militants of the People's Party for Reconstruction and Democracy (PPRD) and those of Congolese Solidarity for Democracy and Development over participation in the June 30 parade. In September 2011 MONUSCO, the United Nations peacekeeping force, reopened a representative office in Pweto. The hope was that this would guarantee security during the forthcoming elections.

In July 2011, Mawson West, an Australian mining company, announced that a feasibility study for an open cut copper mine at nearby Kapulo had given positive results. The find was valued at $141 million.

Mawson West built a new runway to the north of Pweto in 2012–2013 to serve the proposed copper mine, but after construction of the new Pweto Airport, Mawson put the mining plans on hold due to low copper prices, and was subsequently acquired and taken private.
