= Jean Claude Kifwa =

Congolese general

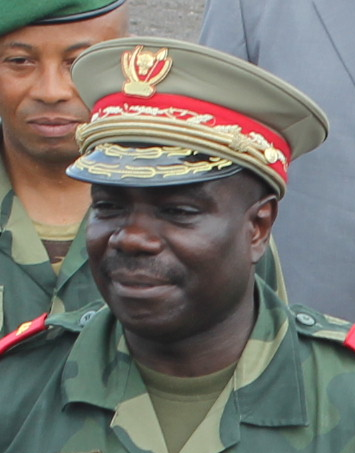
- General Kifwa in 2013
- Born: Jean Claude Kifwa Kambili
- Military career
- Allegiance: Democratic Republic of the Congo
- Branch: Land Forces
- Rank: Major General
- Commands: Republican Guard; 9th Military Region; 2nd Defense Zone
- Conflicts: Second Congo War; Lord's Resistance Army insurgency; Katanga insurgency

Major General Jean Claude Kifwa Kambili is a Congolese military officer. Most prominently, he served as the commander of the Armed Forces of the Democratic Republic of the Congo (FARDC) troops in the Orientale Province and later in the southeastern DRC, including the Kasaï-Oriental, Kasaï-Occidental, and Katanga provinces.

== Biography ==
During the Second Congo War, Kifwa was the head of Laurent-Désiré Kabila's personal guard. He served as the commander of President Joseph Kabila's Republican Guard until 2007.

As of 2008, he was in charge of the 9th military region, Orientale Province. During his time there, the FARDC had to deal with armed groups that were present in the region and neighbouring countries. The FARDC presence along the borders with the Central African Republic and Sudan was minimal, but under Kifwa the Congolese army drove the Lord's Resistance Army out of DR Congo and back into the Central African Republic. Kifwa was also accused of having ties to local Mai Mai militia groups, including those of Paul Sadala.

In September 2014, he was appointed as the commander of the 2nd Defence Zone, which included the provinces of Kasaï-Oriental, Kasaï-Occidental, and Katanga.
