= Congolese Solidarity for Democracy =

Political party in the Democratic Republic of the Congo

Congolese Solidarity for Democracy (Solidarité Congolaise pour la Démocratie - SCODE) is a political party in the Democratic Republic of the Congo. It was founded by Jean-Claude Muyambo who remains the party president during his detention.

In the run-up to the November 2011 presidential elections, in June 2011 a fight broke out in Pweto between militants of the People's Party for Reconstruction and Democracy (PPRD) and those of Congolese Solidarity for Democracy over participation in the June 30 parade. There were clashes in Lubumbashi between youthful supporters of MoÏse Katumbi Chapwe, the Governor of Katanga Province and youths supporting SCODE. Youths backing the PPRD attacked the TV channel owned by SCODE president Jean Claude Muyambo. They also ransacked his house and broke its windows.
