= Lofoi Falls =

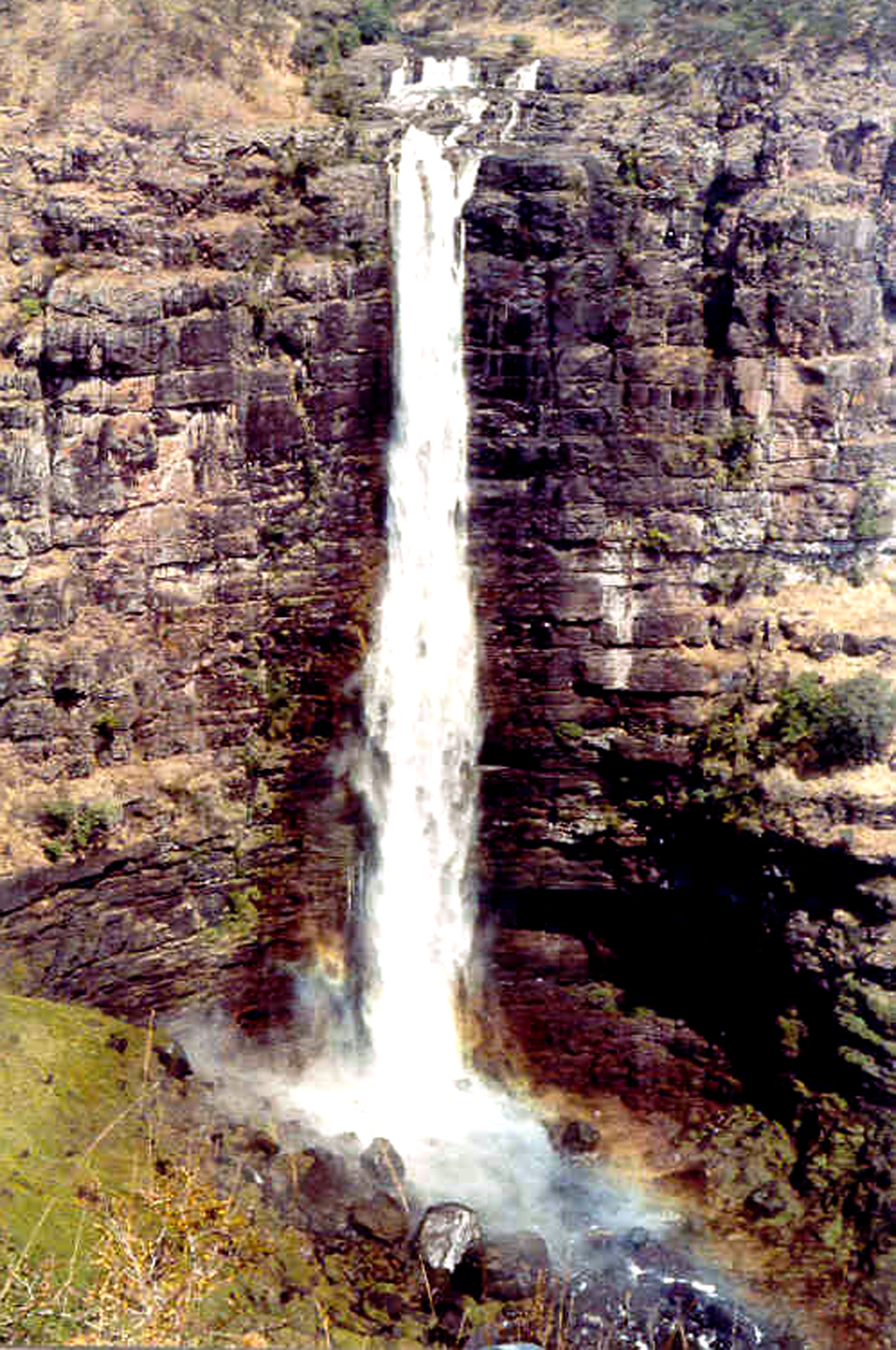

- Location within Democratic Republic of the Congo
- Location: Kundelungu National Park, Katanga Province, Democratic Republic of the Congo
- Coordinates: 10°15′37″S 27°36′24″E
- Total height: 340 metres (1,120 ft)
- Watercourse: Lufira River

Lofoi Falls (also known as Chutes Kaloba and Chutes Lofoi) is a waterfall in Kundelungu National Park, Haut-Katanga Province, Democratic Republic of the Congo. Plunging down for an unbroken 340 m (1,120 ft), it is one of the largest waterfalls in Central Africa. The waters of the Lofoi are a tributary of the Lufira River. The falls shrink quite a bit during the drier season of June to October, but are quite dramatic during the rest of the year.

== See also ==
- List of waterfalls
