= United Nations Security Council Resolution 1399 =

United Nations Security Council resolution

UN Security Council Resolution 1399
- African Great Lakes region
- Date: 19 March 2002
- Meeting no.: 4,495
- Code: S/RES/1399 (Document)
- Subject: The situation concerning the Democratic Republic of the Congo
- Voting summary: 15 voted for; None voted against; None abstained
- Result: Adopted

Security Council composition
- Permanent members: China; France; Russia; United Kingdom; United States
- Non-permanent members: Bulgaria; Cameroon; Colombia; Guinea; Ireland; Mauritius; Mexico; Norway; Singapore; Syria

United Nations Security Council resolution 1399 was adopted unanimously on 19 March 2002. After recalling all previous resolutions on the situation in the Democratic Republic of the Congo, the Council condemned the capture of the town of Moliro and other activities by the rebel Rally for Congolese Democracy (RCD).

The Security Council recalled that parties to the Lusaka Ceasefire Agreement had respected the ceasefire since January 2001, and that inter-Congolese dialogue was an essential element of the peace process. It condemned the resumption of fighting around Moliro and the capture of the town by the RCD-Goma as a major violation of the ceasefire. Moreover, the Council stressed that no party would be allowed to make military gains during the peace process. It demanded that the RCD immediately withdraw from Moliro and Pweto and for all other parties to withdraw to defensive positions called for in the Harare disengagement sub-plans.

Recalling that Kisangani also had to be demilitarised, the resolution reminded all parties to comply with the Ceasefire Agreement and called on Rwanda to use its influence to ensure that the RCD implemented the current resolution. It welcomed the deployment of the United Nations Mission in the Democratic Republic of Congo (MONUC) in the two captured towns and asked for all parties to co-operate with it. Parties to the Ceasefire Agreement were urged to refrain from military action during the inter-Congolese dialogue, and the Government of the Democratic Republic of the Congo was urged to resume its participation in the dialogue.

In response, the RCD said it welcomed the resolution and pledged to hand over the towns to MONUC control. The following day the Congolese government resumed its participation in the talks.

== See also ==
- List of United Nations Security Council Resolutions 1301 to 1400 (2000–2002)
- Lusaka Ceasefire Agreement
- Second Congo War
