= Mitwaba Territory =

Mitwaba Wilaya ya Mitwaba (Swahili)
- Territory
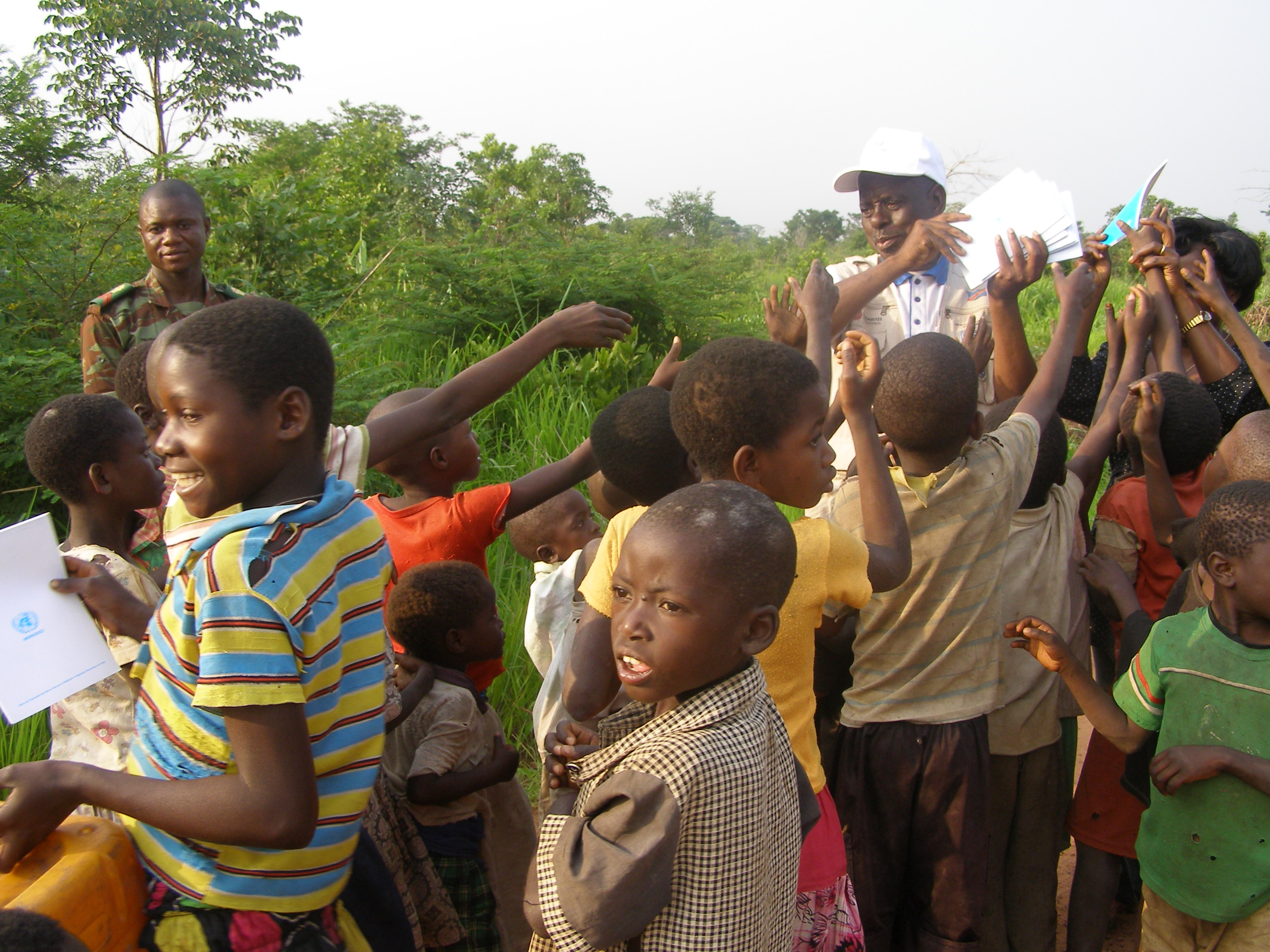
- MONUSCO distributing notebooks to village children to encourage them to attend school
- Interactive map of Mitwaba
- Coordinates: 8.6333°S 27.3333°E
- Country: DR Congo
- Province: Haut-Katanga

Area
  - Total: 25,894 km^{2} (9,998 sq mi)

Population
  - Total: 383,610
  - Density: 14.815/km^{2} (38.370/sq mi)
- Time zone: UTC+2 (CAT)

Mitwaba is a territory in the Haut-Katanga Province of the Democratic Republic of the Congo.

== History ==
On 29 January 2022, about 100 Mai Mai Kata Katanga rebels led by Gédéon Kyungu captured the settlement of Mitwaba; the rebels used the opportunity to once more declare the intention to restore Katanga's independence. Though the insurgents did not harm the local civilians, many fled, fearing Mai Mai Kata Katanga's reputation. The separatist militants retreated from Mitwaba Territory before Congoloese security forces could respond effectively, though some insurgents reportedly surrendered as the rest withdrew.
