= Moba, Democratic Republic of the Congo =

Moba
- Location within Democratic Republic of the Congo
- Coordinates: 7.03982°S 29.766147°E
- Country: Democratic Republic of the Congo
- Province: Tanganyika
- Territory: Moba
- Climate: Aw
- National language: Swahili

Moba is a town located in the Democratic Republic of the Congo in Tanganyika Province. It is the administrative center of Moba Territory.

== Location ==
Moba is situated on the western shore of the southern part of Lake Tanganyika, 140 kilometres (87 mi) south-east of Kalemie, to which it is linked by regular boat services. The Rafiki is the largest and most comfortable of the available ferry services. The larger town of Kirungu (Kilungu) is on a plateau 400 metres (1,300 ft) above the lake and 5 km from Moba. A dirt road leads down from Kirungu to a jetty in Moba.

Moba lies just south of the Mulobozi river. The Marungu highlands, a range of steep rugged hills, rises behind the town, bisected by the Mulobozi. The smaller northern section rises to an elevation of about 2,100 metres (6,900 ft) and the larger southern section to about 2,460 metres (8,070 ft). The highest mountain in Moba is called Murumbi.

== People ==
In 1984 Moba had a population of 25,463. Its ethnic identity is mostly Tabwa.

== History ==
The city was created in 1893 by White Fathers who established a post at nearby Kirungu which they called Baudoinville/Boudewijnstad after Prince Baudouin of Belgium.

== Civil war and aftermath ==
During the Second Congo War (1998-2003) the region became a battle zone between government forces and rebel groups. The area between Pweto, Moba and Moliro has been called the "Triangle of Death". In November 2000, DRC government troops with Interahamwe fighters, former Rwandan army troops now fighting for the DRC government and other allies launched an offensive. They captured positions held by the Congolese Rally for Democracy-Goma (RCD-Goma), such as Pweto, Pepa, and attacked Moba port. The RCD-Goma and Rwandan Patriotic Army (RPA) forces counter-attacked early in December 2000. The Rwandans re-took Pweto and Moba early in December 2000.

On 1 August 2007 a mob of demonstrators assaulted United Nations military observers and damaged offices belonging to the UNHCR and sister agencies. The United Nations withdrew from the town and ceased repatriation of refugees living in Zambia.

== Economy ==
There are no paved roads in the Moba area nor within several hundred kilometres of the town. Two dirt roads, frequently impassable in the rainy season, are the only access by land from the west and south. Moba had long been without electricity. Since 1996, there is a small hydroelectric dam built to provide its population with electricity. This dam was sponsored by an Italian NGO, Mondo Gusto, on Ngandwe Fuamba river.

Economic activity in Moba is mostly farming, fishing and gold mining.
