= Anvil Mining =

- Type: Copper mining
- Traded as: TSX: AVM; ASX: AVM
- Industry: Mining
- Founded: 2002
- Defunct: 2012
- Fate: acquired by MMG Limited
- Headquarters: Democratic Republic of the Congo, Australia, Montreal, Canada

Anvil Mining (French: Extraction à l'enclume) was a copper producer that has been operating in the Democratic Republic of the Congo (DRC) from 2002 to 2012. The company headquarters were in Montreal, Quebec, Canada. Anvil was listed on the Toronto Stock Exchange and the Australian Stock Exchange. As of September 2011 its major shareholder was Trafigura Beheer.

Following it being acquired by MMG Limited, most of board members of the company resigned, and shares of the company were set to be delisted.

== Kilwa controversy ==
Anvil Mining operated the Dikulushi Mine near Kilwa, Katanga. In October 2004 there was a small-scale uprising in Kilwa which was brutally suppressed by FARDC soldiers of the 62nd Brigade. Anvil Mining Congo was accused of providing logistical support to the troops. Indeed, the Commander of the 6th military region in Lubumbashi informed a UN Special Investigation into the incident that the military operation was made possible thanks to Anvil's support. Anvil later said it had no choice about letting the army use its vehicles and no knowledge of what they planned to do. However, Anvil made no mention of a requisition in its report for Q4 2004. Moreover, Anvil's chief executive, Bill Turner, did not say anything about a compulsory requisition when he discussed the incident in an Australian television documentary in early June 2005. The claim was not made until late June 2005, after this documentary was aired and nearly nine months after the incident. The company published a statement by the traditional chiefs of Moero Sector that denied any involvement by Anvil in the massacre and that praised the company for the benefits it had brought to the region.

== Other properties ==
In November 2004, Anvil Mining agreed to pay US$12.5 million for a 70% interest in the Mutoshi copper-cobalt project. The property included the old Mutoshi Mine, the Kulumaziba coarse rejects/tailings deposit, the Mutoshi Northwest deposit, the Nioka deposit, the [®:. Kamukonko cobalt prospect, and prospective ground on the Kolwezi Klippe. In late 2005, Anvil started mining the tailings, at first with good results. Productivity began to decline in 2007 and 2008, and Anvil suspended tailings operations at the end of 2008.

In February 2010 it was announced that the Australian exploratory mining company Mawson West was to acquire the Dikulushi copper-silver mine, which had been on care and maintenance since the fourth quarter of 2008. Anvil would receive 28% stake in Mawson in return. The transfer would let Anvil focus on its larger copper projects, including the Kinsevere Stage II project expected to start commissioning early in 2011 and to produce 60,000 tonnes annually. Mawson West also acquired the rights to a copper mine in the Kapulo area of Pweto Territory, Katanga Province from Anvil Mining in May 2010. The ore deposit is north of the main copper belt in the Kundelungu Plateau zone.

== Minmetal takeover ==
In September 2011 a friendly takeover offer from Chinese Minmetals Resources was announced, causing a surge in share prices. Minmetals Resources is a unit of the state-owned China Minmetals Group. It was expected that Anvil could produce 60,000 tons of copper cathode yearly, starting in 2012. After the takeover announcement, the DRC's state-owned Gécamines mining company said that the change of ownership would lead to reviews of the agreements related to Anvil's projects at Kinsevere and Mutoshi Mine.

== See also ==
- Economy of the Democratic Republic of the Congo
- Mining in the Democratic Republic of the Congo
- Canadian Companies Mining in the Democratic Republic of the Congo
- Katanga Province
- Gécamines
- Anvil Mining
- Xstrata
- Glencore
