= Kapulo mine =

Kapulo mine La mine de Kapulo
- Location in the Congo
- Location: Pweto, Haut-Katanga, DR Congo; 8.313°S 29.234°E
- Products: Copper; Silver

The Kapulo mine (French: La mine de Kapulo) is a cassiterite mine and a planned copper mine in the Democratic Republic of the Congo. It is located near a village of the same name.

In 2007 one of the two remaining full FARDC brigades in Katanga was stationed in Pweto Territory. This brigade, the 62nd, was illegally exploiting the Cassiterite mine in Kapulo. The ore is exported through the Musosa, Moba Territory border crossing into Zambia, bypassing customs posts.

The Australian mining company Mawson West acquired the rights to a copper mine in the area from Anvil Mining in May 2010. The ore deposit is on the eastern edge the Katanga sedimentary basin, and is north of the main copper belt in the Kundelungu Plateau zone. There are two ore zones, Shaba and Safari, separated by the 60 kilometres (37 mi) long Kapulo fault. In July 2011, Mawson West announced that a feasibility study for an open cut copper mine at Kapulo had given positive results. The find was valued at $141 million. Basic reserves are estimated at 200,000 tonnes of copper metal and 1.8 million ounces silver.

Assuming construction started immediately, a processing plant could start operations in November 2012. There could be further potential underground and elsewhere along the Kapulo fault. Infrastructure would include plant and buildings at the mine, a water dam and tailings storage facility. The company would upgrade the road from Pweto to improve access to the Pweto airstrip, which is 45 minutes by road away from the mine. Mining was begun at Kapulo in 2015, but suspended in 2016, due to low copper prices.

Facing financial difficulties, Mawson West, along with the Kapulo mine, was acquired by a subsidiary of Trafigura in 2016.

== See also ==
- Dikulushi Mine
