= Luvua River =

River in Katanga Province, Democratic Republic of the Congo

Coordinates: 6°45′41″S 26°57′26″E

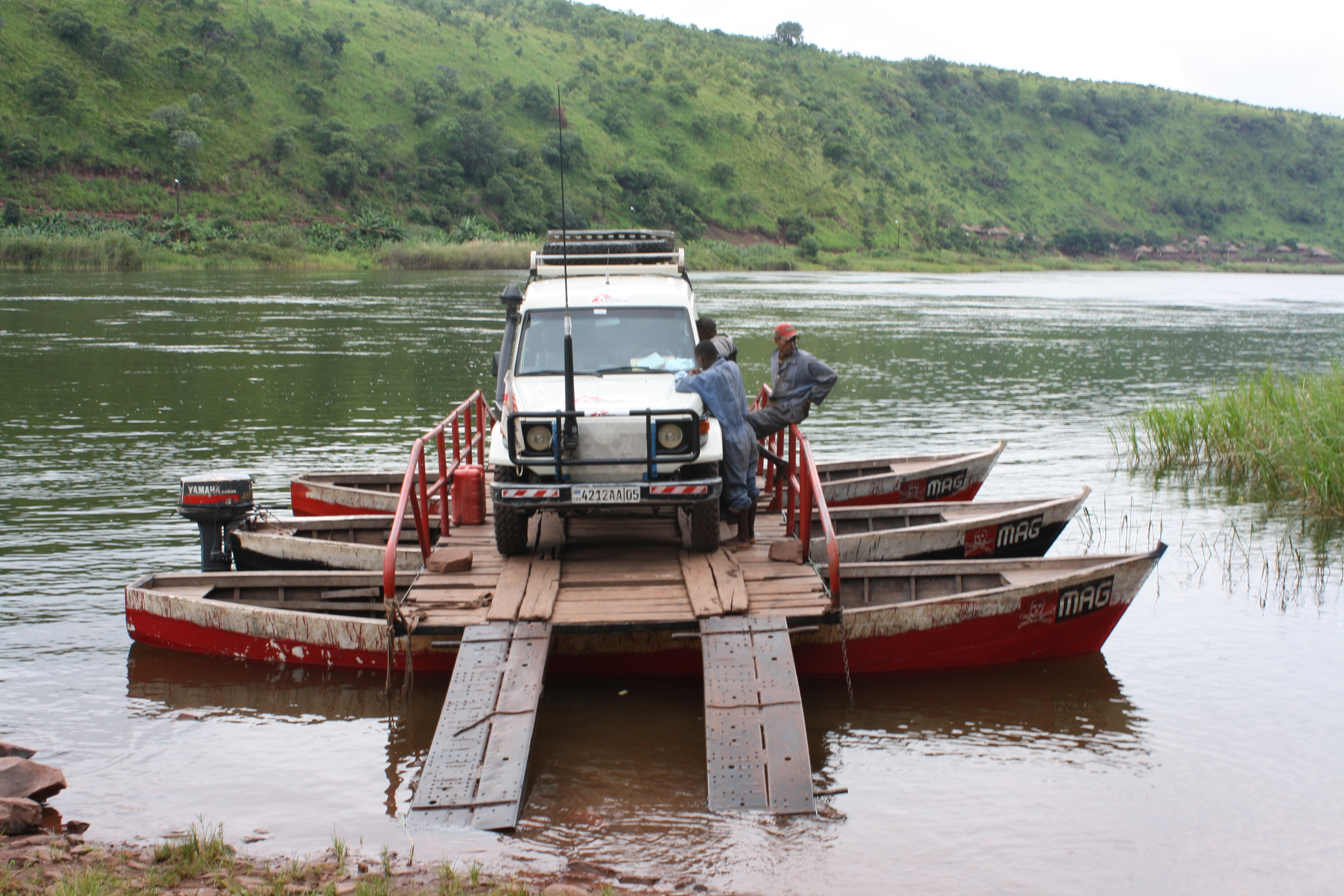
- Car being ferried across the Luvua River near Pweto, Katanga, DRC

Location
- Country: Democratic Republic of the Congo

Physical characteristics
- Source
  - location: Lake Mweru (Pweto)
  - elevation: 931 metres (3,054 ft)
- Mouth
  - location: Lualaba River (Ankoro)
- Length: 350 km (220 mi)
- Basin size: 265,300 km^{2} (102,400 sq mi)
- Discharge
  - average: 600 m^{3}/s (21,000 cu ft/s)

Basin features
- River system: Congo

The Luvua River (or Lowa River) (Swahili: Mto Luvua) is a river in the Katanga Province of the Democratic Republic of the Congo (DRC). It flows from the northern end of Lake Mweru on the Zambia-Congo border in a northwesterly direction for 350 kilometres (220 mi) to its confluence with the Lualaba River opposite the town of Ankoro. The Lualaba becomes the Congo River below the Boyoma Falls.

== Course ==
Lake Mweru, at an elevation of about 1,000 metres (3,300 ft), is a floodplain lake that has been formed by a process of erosion where the wind has carried off alluvium. The Luvua River leaves the north end of the lake at Pweto in the DRC. The river flows about 350 kilometres (220 mi) northwest to Ankoro, where it meets the Lualaba. The middle course of the river is obstructed by a series of rapids, torrents and cataracts as it drops down from the plateau into the Congo Basin. At Piana Mwanga the falls are used to generate electricity for the Manono and Kitotolo mines. The river can be navigated in shallow-draft boats for 160 kilometres (99 mi) of its lower course below Kiambi. The Luvua has its peak discharge between March and May, with significantly lower discharge between September and November.

== Watershed ==
The Luvua River is the northernmost stream in red.

The Congo River basin has the form of a huge, shallow saucer. The Luvua breaks through the southeast rim of this saucer, bringing water from the Mweru-Bangweulu watershed. The Luvua drains an area of over 218,000 square kilometres (84,000 sq mi), much of which was at one time part of the Zambezi watershed. There is strong faunal evidence for the Luvua basin having once been part of the Zambezi system, with several species of fish that are common in the Zambezi system also being found in the Luvua. Congo fauna have penetrated up the Luvua into Lake Mweru, but have been blocked by the Mambatuta Falls from entry into Lake Bangweulu. The transition occurred in the early Tertiary.

== Congo headwater theory ==
Some geographers consider that the Luvua is a section of the Congo River. They place the origin of the Congo in the highlands between Tanzania and Zambia, where the Chambeshi River originates, flowing southwest to Lake Bangweulu. From that lake the Luapula River emerges and flows northward over 500 kilometres (310 mi) to Lake Mweru. The Luvua river exits lake Mweru and flows northwest to join the Lualaba River, which becomes the Congo River further downstream. Some say that the Congo begins where the Lualaba and Luvua meet. The argument for treating the Lualaba as the main headwater, although it is much shorter, is that it has twice the volume of water at the point where it meets the Luvua.

== History ==
The upper Luvua valley was home to the Bwile people. Sometime after 1810 Kumwimbe Ngombe, ruler of the Luba Kingdom, conquered the region. The European missionary and explorer David Livingstone "discovered" Lake Mweru in 1867, and formed the theory that the Luvua flowed to the Upper Nile. It was only after Livingstone's death that Henry Morton Stanley in his expedition of 1874-1877 showed that the river in fact was a tributary of the Congo. Starting in 1891, a Swahili named Shimba launched a series of slave-raiding expeditions that depopulated most of the western shore of Lake Mweru. Shimba joined forces with another Swahili named Kafindo who was based on the upper Luvua and attacked the local Yeke ruler. These attacks continued until the Belgian Braseur arrived and began to "pacify" the region, which the European powers had agreed belonged to Belgium.

In 2000, during the Second Congo War, government forces suffered a major defeat by Rwandan forces at Pweto, at the source of the river. The DRC forces had brought most of their armored vehicles across the river. There was a single ferry, and they did not have enough time to evacuate the vehicles before the Rwandans arrived. Soldiers loaded a T-62 tank awkwardly, and the ferry tipped over and sank. The Rwandans found 33 tanks, as well as other vehicles, which the DRC troops had tried to burn.

== Sources ==
- Daniel, Roger (2011). "Crossing Africa by Motorboat". Archived from the original on 2008-10-09.
- Davies, Bryan Robert; Walker, Keith F. (1986). The Ecology of river systems. Springer. ISBN 90-6193-540-7.
- Day, Trevor; Garratt, Richard (2006). "Congo (Zaire) River". Lakes and rivers. Infobase Publishing. ISBN 0-8160-5328-6.
- Fitzgerald, Walter (1948). Africa: a social, economic and political geography of its major regions. Methuen.
- Gupta, Avijit (2008). Large Rivers: Geomorphology and Management. John Wiley & Sons. ISBN 978-0-470-72371-5.
- Hughes, R. H.; Hughes, J. S. (1992). A directory of African wetlands. IUCN. ISBN 2-88032-949-3.
- Kisangani, Emizet F.; Bobb, F. Scott (2010). "Luvua River". Historical Dictionary of the Democratic Republic of the Congo. Scarecrow Press. ISBN 978-0-8108-5761-2.
- Macola, Giacomo (2002). The kingdom of Kazembe: history and politics in North-Eastern Zambia and Katanga to 1950. LIT Verlag Münster. ISBN 3-8258-5997-5.
- Stearns, Jason (2011). Dancing in the Glory of Monsters: The Collapse of the Congo and the Great War of Africa. PublicAffairs. ISBN 978-1-58648-929-8.
- Thieme, Michele L. (2005). Freshwater ecoregions of Africa and Madagascar: a conservation assessment. Island Press. ISBN 1-55963-365-4.
- Wohl, Ellen (2010). A World of Rivers: Environmental Change on Ten of the World's Great Rivers. University of Chicago Press. ISBN 978-0-226-90478-8.
