= Odilon Kafitwe wa pa Bowa =

Odilon Kafitwe wa Pa Bowa (14 December 1939 – 12 June 1993) was a politician in the Democratic Republic of the Congo (DRC). Kafitwe held various positions as Director at Gecamines, member of the board of directors at SNCC, CEO of Gecamine Development, Co founder of UFERI one of the biggest political party in the early 1990s and Minister of Justice. He initiated the renovation and put in place an Artisan Development Academy in some of the prisons around the country. When he was head of CEPSE Kafitwe made a record that was never reached in the productions of Maize for the Katanga province and initiated a food security program for the Province with the boosting and Development of farms in Katanga (Mangombo, Kando et Kasonga). He is one of the rare leader in the DRC who had a chance to be honored by being buried on top of a mountain in a town call Likasi "Montagne du Mangeur de Cuivre" because of advocating to the world to recognize the Copper-eaters. The first African people who worked the red metal well before the arrival of the Belgians in the DRC les " Mangeurs de Cuivre".

Kafitwe wa Pa Bowa was born on the 14 December 1939 in the valley of Kansenia in Katanga Province. He attended primary and secondary schools at l’institut KADIVA In the Valley of Kansenia; he went to the University of Lubumbashi and earned a Doctor of Laws degree. Odilon Kafitwe wa pa Bowa died in Likasi on 12 June 1993 and was buried in the same town on top of a mountain "le village de mangeur de Cuivre".
