= Pepa Airport =

- IATA: none; ICAO: FZRJ

Summary
- Serves: Pepa
- Location: Democratic Republic of the Congo
- Elevation AMSL: 6,562 ft / 2,000 m
- Coordinates: 7.715287°S 29.809856°E

Map

Runways
Direction	Length		Surface
Direction	m	ft	Surface
18/36	1,760	5,774	Grass
- Sources: GCM Google Maps

Pepa Airport (ICAO: FZRJ) is an airstrip 3 kilometres (2 mi) east of the village of Pepa in Tanganyika Province, Democratic Republic of the Congo.

== History ==
In April 2000, during the Second Congo War (1998-2003), a Rwandan Air Force Antonov An-8 crashed on take-off from the airstrip, killing the crew of four and about 20 Rwandan soldiers, including a Rwanda Army major, two captains, and two lieutenants. Other reports placed the death toll as high as 57.

The cause was thought to be a birdstrike.

== See also ==
- Transport in the Democratic Republic of the Congo
- List of airports in the Democratic Republic of the Congo
