= Pweto Airport =

- IATA: PWO; ICAO: FZQC

Summary
- Serves: Pweto, Democratic Republic of the Congo
- Elevation AMSL: 3,625 ft / 1,105 m
- Coordinates: 8°24′00″S 28°55′35″E

Map
- Location of the airport in the DRC

Runways
Direction	Length		Surface
Direction	m	ft	Surface
01/19	2,000	6,562	Asphalt
- Sources: Google Maps OpenStreetMap

Pweto Airport (IATA: PWO, ICAO: FZQC) is an airport serving Pweto, a town in the Democratic Republic of the Congo. Pweto is on the northernmost corner of Lake Mweru, and on the border with Zambia.

The airport is 7 kilometres (4.3 mi) north of the town. It is new, replacing the previous dirt runway to the west of Pweto.

It was upgraded by Chinese company China Jiangxi International (CJIC) in 2011-2013. And the Australian company Mawson West being the major financer to serve its proposed copper mine to the east at Kapulo. After CJIC constructed the runway, Mawson put the mining plans on hold due to low copper prices, and the airport was subsequently acquired and taken private.

== See also ==
- Transport in the Democratic Republic of the Congo
- List of airports in the Democratic Republic of the Congo
