= Karaka Karenze =

Colonel Karake Karenzi was a Rwandan soldier who was head of operations for the Rwandan army in 2001. He led the army in the Pweto mission in the Democratic Republic of the Congo in which he pulled some 3,000 of troops out of in February 2001.

He said "This is generally in support of the peace process, but is also a goodwill gesture which we hope will bring an appropriate response from the government in Kinshasa".
