= Mambilima Falls =

Rapids on Luapula river

Coordinates: 10.575825°S 28.669982°E

Mambilima Falls is a series of rapids on the Luapula River on the boundary between Zambia and the Democratic Republic of the Congo. The falls used to be called the Johnstone Falls. They extend along a 5 kilometres (3.1 mi) stretch of the river.

Below Lake Bangweulu the Luapula is a broad, swamplike system flowing southward that turns west and descends the steep Mambatuta Falls before meandering north to the Mambilima falls. The lush and densely populated Luapula valley opens out beyond the Mambilima falls into a huge area of marshes, floodplains and lagoons at the southern end of Lake Mweru. There is an almost continuous stretch of villages from the falls to the lake. Traditionally, the fishermen near the falls used dams, weirs and traps to catch as many fish as possible before the flood water receded. The fish of Lake Mweru do not spawn south of the waterfalls and rapids, where Lake Bangweulu has a distinct ecology.

== See also ==
- List of waterfalls
- List of waterfalls of Zambia

== Sources ==
- Jul-Larsen, Eyolf (2003). Management, co-management or no management?: major dilemmas in southern African freshwater fisheries. Case studies. Food & Agriculture Org. ISBN 92-5-105032-5.
- McIntyre, Chris (2008). Zambia: the Bradt travel guide. Bradt Travel Guides. ISBN 978-1-84162-226-2.
- Tvedt, Terje; Jakobsson, Eva; Coopey, Richard; Oestigaard, Terje (2006). A History of Water: The world of water. I.B.Tauris. ISBN 1-85043-447-6.
