= Kinsevere =

- Location within Democratic Republic of the Congo
- Location: Haut-Katanga Province, Democratic Republic of the Congo; 11°21′48″S 27°33′50″E
- Products: Copper
- Production: 36,000 tonnes
- Financial year: 2011
- Company: MMG Limited
- Website: www.mmg.com/our-business/kinsevere/
- Acquired: 2012

Kinsevere is an open pit mine and Heavy Media Separation plant with an electric arc furnace formerly operated by Anvil Mining, and now operated by Minerals and Metals Group. It is located 30 kilometres (19 mi) north of Lubumbashi, Katanga Province, Democratic Republic of Congo.

Kinsevere is in the Kipushi Territory in Katanga province. There are three deposits: Central Pit, Mashi and Kinsevere Hill. These are mostly stratiform deposits in alternating dolomitic and terrigenous formations. The dolomitic rocks that underlay the formations are excellent aquifers.

== History ==
=== Anvil Mining ===
The deposit was originally owned fully by Gécamines, the mine was leased out on a 25-year term to Moïse Katumbi's Mining Company Katanga (MCK). By June 2006, stage I development of the mine was being carried out by AMCK, a joint venture owned 70% by the Australia-based Anvil Mining, and 30% by Mining Company Katanga. Anvil then increased its interest in the venture to 95%. The proceeds from the sale, along with nearby deposits, netted Katumbi $61.3 million, which he used to finance his successful American-style election campaign to the governorship of Katanga province in 2007.

For the year of 2011, Anvil expected to produce between 36,000 and 38,000 tonnes of copper as copper cathodes and copper in concentrates. Anvil was completing construction of a $400 million SX-EW plant to extract the copper, and the Heavy Media Separation plant was scheduled to shut down at the end of June 2011. After the upgrades, the mine is expected to produce about 60,000 tons of copper annually. Anvil is studying the potential for further increasing the rate of production.

=== Minmetal Resources ===
In September 2011, the Hong Kong-listed Minmetals Resources Ltd announced a $1.3 billion offer to by Anvil Mining, which was unanimously accepted by Anvil's board. Gécamines claimed the acquisition triggered a review of the projects' lease, and threatening to block the deal. Minmetals extended the timeframe of its offer several times to allow time for the dispute to be resolved. In February 2012, Gecamines dropped its opposition to the deal. Minerals and Metals Group then announced a successful takeover bid for Anvil worth $1.3 billion, including a 95% stake in the Kinsevere mine.

In March 2020, a court ordered some of the operations' assets to be frozen, due to a $258 million wrongful termination lawsuit from Mining Company Katanga, a mining services company associated with the former governor of Katanga Province, Moïse Katumbi. A joint report released by the Congolese non-governmental organizations Humanisme et Droits Humains, JUSTICIA Asbl, and Ligue Congolaise de luttecontre la Corruption claimed that MMG was exerting pressure on the magistrates in order to sway the outcome of the court case in MMG's favor. An article from the outlet Africa Intelligence claimed the non-governmental organizations responsible for the report were motivated by political support for Katumbi, an allegation that the organizations strongly deny.

In late 2020, MMG announced the mine would be transitioning from sulfide ore to oxide ore, halting mining October 1. While no mining took place at Kinsevere in 2021, as of March 2022, MMG has announced a $600 million expansion of the mine aimed at producing 80,000 tons of copper cathode and 5,000 tons of cobalt hydroxide.
