= Dikulushi Mine =

Mine in the Democratic Republic of the Congo

Dikulushi mine
- Location in the Congo
- Location: Lake Mweru, Haut-Katanga, DR Congo; 8°53′38″S 28°16′22″E
- Products: Copper Silver
- Production: Copper: 400 tonnes/month Silver: 35,000 ounces/month
- Financial year: 2010
- Opened: 2002
- Company: JCHX Mining Management Co Ltd
- Website: www.jchxmc.com?about_150.html
- Acquired: 2019

The Dikulushi mine (French: Mine de Dikulushi) is a copper and silver mine in the Democratic Republic of the Congo. It is located some 23 kilometres (14 mi) west of Lake Mweru and 50 kilometres (31 mi) north of Kilwa in the Moero Sector of Pweto Territory, Katanga Province.

The leading DRC copper company Anvil Mining brought the site into production in October 2002 with some 10% Community Trust involvement. The mine has a total of 481,000 tonnes of proven mineral reserves and over 650,000 estimated. While the mine was operational, heavy trucks carrying concentrate crossed Lake Mweru on a large motorised pontoon ferry from Kilwa to Nchelenge, a distance of 44 kilometres (27 mi), from where they drove 2,500 kilometres (1,600 mi) to a copper smelter in Tsumeb, Namibia.

In October 2004 there was a small-scale uprising in Kilwa which was brutally suppressed by FARDC soldiers of the 62nd Brigade. Anvil Mining Congo was accused of providing logistical support to the troops. The company published a statement by the Traditional Chiefs of Moero Sector that firmly denied any involvement by Anvil in the massacre and that praised the company for the benefits it had brought to the region. As of December 4, 2008, Anvil had placed Dikulushi Mine on "Care and Maintenance" due to the low prices of copper.

In March 2010, Anvil sold the mine to Mawson West Limited. The transfer would let Anvil focus on its larger copper projects, including the Kinsevere Stage II project expected to start commissioning early in 2011 and to produce 60,000 tonnes annually. Mawson West reopened the Dikulushi mine in July 2010. The mine was mothballed in 2015 by Mawson West after the mine produced lower than expected yields of copper

Facing financial difficulties, Mawson West was acquired by Galena Private Equity Resources (a subsidiary of Trafigura) and delisted from the Toronto stock exchange.

The Dikulushi mine was subsequently acquired by the China-based JCHX group (Chinese: 金诚信) in 2019.

== See also ==
- Kapulo mine
