= Moero Sector =

Moero
- Sector
- Location within Democratic Republic of the Congo
- Coordinates: 9.285745°S 28.333536°E
- Country: DR Congo
- Province: Haut-Katanga
- Territory: Pweto
- Seat: Kilwa

Moero Sector is an administrative division of Pweto Territory in Haut-Katanga Province of the Democratic Republic of the Congo (DRC). The headquarters are in the town of Kilwa.

Moero Sector lies to the west of Lake Mweru. The territory is agriculturally productive and the lake is rich in fish. There is no formal industry apart from the Dikulushi Mine near Kilwa, the capital city of Moero Sector, operated by Anvil Mining, an Australian company.

In October 2004 a small-scale uprising in Kilwa was brutally suppressed by FARDC soldiers of the 62nd Brigade. Anvil Mining Congo was accused of providing logistical support to the troops. The company published a statement by the Traditional Chiefs of Moero Sector that firmly denied any involvement by Anvil in the massacre and that praised the company for the benefits it had brought to the region.
