= Kundelungu National Park =

National park in the Democratic Republic of the Congo

Kundelungu National Park Parc national de Kundelungu
- IUCN category II (national park)
- Location within Democratic Republic of the Congo
- Location: Democratic Republic of the Congo
- Coordinates: 10.250000°S 27.600000°E
- Area: 7,600 km^{2} (2,900 sq mi)
- Established: 1970
- Governing body: Institut Congolais pour la Conservation de la Nature

Kundelungu National Park (French: Parc national de Kundelungu) is a national park of the Democratic Republic of the Congo, located in Haut-Katanga Province.

== History ==
The park was first established in 1970.

In January 2023, the Armed Forces of the Democratic Republic of the Congo launched an operation against Mai Mai Kata Katanga rebels who were hiding in the Upemba and Kundelungu National Park.

== Geography ==
The park has an area of about 7,600 km^{2} (2,900 sq mi). It is the site of Lofoi Falls, a 340 metres (1,120 ft) high waterfall which is one of the highest in Central Africa. It is an IUCN Category II park.

== Environment ==
The ecosystem is mainly grassy savanna on large steppes dotted with forest galleries, characteristics of Katanga. Fauna found in the park include antelopes, jackals, porcupines, warthogs, snakes, monkeys, buffalos, hippopotamuses and bird species including egrets, marabou storks and pelicans. The park has been designated an Important Bird Area (IBA) by BirdLife International because it supports significant populations of many bird species.
