= Mai-Mai Kata Katanga =

Congolese rebel group

Mai-Mai Kata Katanga Maï-Maï Kata Katanga (in French)
- The flag of the State of Katanga (1960-63) has been used by Kata Katanga
- Leader: Gédéon Kyungu Mutanga (since 2011)
- Dates active: 1991–present
- Active regions: Katanga Province, Democratic Republic of the Congo
- Size: 3,000 men (2013 est.)

Mai-Mai Kata Katanga, also called Mai-Mai Bakata Katanga, is a mai-mai rebel group in the Democratic Republic of the Congo which advocates the independence of the Congo's Katanga Province, fighting in the Katanga insurgency. It was formed shortly after the group's leader, Gédéon Kyungu Mutanga, escaped from prison in September 2011 where he was serving a sentence for crimes against humanity committed by his supporters between 2002 and 2006 in central Katanga. Kata Katanga means "cut [e.g. secede] Katanga" in Swahili. It has been estimated that, at its height in 2013, the Kata Katanga rebels numbered approximately 3,000 of whom most were based in Mitwaba Territory.

== History ==
Mai-Mai Kata Katanga's most significant operation occurred on 23 March 2013 when 200 rebels entered Lubumbashi, the provincial capital of Katanga and the Congo's second largest city, carrying the flag of the former secessionist state of Katanga (1960–63). At least 35 people died and sixty were wounded before the rebels surrendered to United Nations (UN) peacekeepers. As a result of the conflict, nearly 400,000 people from Katanga live in camps as internally displaced persons.

In August 2013, the United Nations mission in the Democratic Republic of the Congo, MONUSCO, rescued 82 children, some as young as eight, who had been forcibly recruited by the militia as child soldiers. MONUSCO claimed that a total of 163, including 22 girls, had been freed since the beginning of the year. The UN Office for the Coordination of Humanitarian Affairs said that the effects of the Kata Katanga's insurgency had spread to half of Katanga's 22 territories by March 2013.

Kata Katanga violence declined after 2013 and, in 2015, Kyungu announced that he would create a political party to stand in the anticipated elections in 2017. In October 2016, Kyungu himself and several hundred rebels surrendered their weapons in a ceremony in Lubumbashi. His party is the Movement of African Revolutionary Independentists (Mouvement des Indépendantistes Révolutionnaires Africains, MIRA). The group's political affiliation is unclear, with no apparent links to foreign funding or national allies, and its activities have a regional reach.

Kata Katanga remains active and made several "incursions" into towns and cities in Katanga. Three government soldiers and two rebels were killed during a confrontation in Lubumbashi in October 2019. Several further incursions were made into towns across Katanga on 29 March 2020 in which 30 rebels were killed. A further attack in Lubumbashi took place on 25 September 2020 in which 16 rebels and three soldiers were killed. In the attack, the militia again used the Katanga flag and were armed primarily with machetes.

On 29 January 2022, about 100 Mai Mai Kata Katanga fighters under Gédéon captured Mitwaba in Mitwaba Territory; the rebels used the opportunity to once more declare the intention to restore Katanga's independence. They retreated from the area before security forces could respond effectively. FARDC claimed that some rebels had surrendered as the remainder withdrew. In January 2023, the FARDC targeted Mai Mai Kata Katanga forces which were hiding in the Kundelungu and Upemba National Parks. Over the course of 2024, Mai-Mai Kata Katanga organized several raids, with the largest attack taking place in December and targeting four villages in Moba Territory, causing 4,000 people to flee their homes.

== See also ==
- Congo Crisis (1960-1965), during which Katanga seceded from the Congo
- Front for Congolese National Liberation (FLNC), an exiled Katangese militia active in the 1970s
- History of Katanga
