= Flag of Katanga =

Flag of the breakaway State of Katanga (1960–1963)

State of Katanga
- Use: National flag
- Proportion: 3:4
- Adopted: 29 June 1960
- Relinquished: 21 January 1963
- Design: Flag divided diagonally from lower hoist-side to the upper fly-side into two fields, one red and the other white. The fields are separated by a green band. In the white field are three red Katanga crosses.
- Designed by: Louis Dressen
- Use: Commonly seen alternate orientation of croisettes

The flag of the unrecognised and now-defunct State of Katanga, a regime in the southern part of the Democratic Republic of the Congo that briefly existed during the Congo Crisis, was designed by an architect Louis Dressen, former manager of Banque du Congo Belge in Elisabethville (modern-day Lubumbashi).

Components of the flag represent the motto of Katanga: Force, espoir et Paix dans la Prospérité (English: Power, Hope and Peace in Prosperity). The red component is for power, green for hope, white for peace and the croisettes (based on the area's traditional currency, the Katanga cross) for prosperity.

Despite an official guide having been published as to the flag's design and dimensions, due to the state of affairs in the region at the time, this was not enforced. Variants were common, including ones of different ratios (such as 2:3 or 3:5), ones with golden coloured croisettes, and ones where the croisettes were replaced with saltires (diagonal crosses).

== Other flags ==
=== Variant flags ===
Apart from the one that has alternate orientation of the croisettes, other common variants include flags with different proportions, altered colors for the crosses, and the frequent substitution of the croisettes with saltires.

=== Military flags ===
Flag of the Katanga Gendarmerie

Flag of the Katanga Military Police

== See also ==
- Flag of the Democratic Republic of the Congo
- Katanga cross
