= Mambatuta Falls =

Steep waterfall on the Luapula River

Coordinates: 12.374483°S 29.2122434°E

The Mambatuta Falls is a steep waterfall on the Luapula River, which originates in Lake Bangweulu and flows through Zambia and along the border with the Democratic Republic of the Congo into Lake Mweru.

The Luapula flows south from Lake Bangweulu as a broad, swampy river a few hundred meters (yards) wide. It then turns west and runs along the border with the Democratic Republic of Congo. After the Mambatuta falls the river narrows and meanders north, then descends through the Mambilima falls, following which it broadens into a wetland region 150 kilometres (93 mi) that feeds the south end of Lake Mweru.

Mambatuta is a steep waterfall that descends in a single vertical drop. At one time the Bangweulu / Mweru basin was part of the Zambezi system, and several species of fish that are common in the Zambezi system are found in the Luapula. Congo fauna have penetrated up the Luvua into Lake Mweru, but have been blocked by the Mambatuta Falls from entry into Lake Bangweulu. The transition occurred in the early Tertiary.
