= Kilwa, Democratic Republic of the Congo =

Kilwa
- Location within Democratic Republic of the Congo
- Coordinates: 9.286°S 28.334°E
- Country: DR Congo
- Province: Haut-Katanga
- Territory: Pweto
- Sector: Moero

Population (2005)
  - Total: 6,000
- Climate: Aw

Kilwa is a town, headquarters of Moero Sector, Pweto Territory, Haut-Katanga Province of the Democratic Republic of the Congo (DRC).

Kilwa lies on the west shore of Lake Mweru opposite Kilwa Island, which is part of Zambia. Kilwa is 350 kilometres (220 mi) from Lubumbashi. The population of 6,000 mainly live from fishing. The Cathédrale Saint André is located in Kilwa, which is a seat of the Diocese of Kilwa–Kasenga.

The Dikulushi Mine near Kilwa was operated by Anvil Mining, an Australian company. In October 2004 there was a small-scale uprising in Kilwa which was brutally suppressed by FARDC soldiers of the 62nd Brigade. Anvil Mining Congo was accused of providing logistical support to the troops. The company published a statement by the Traditional Chiefs of Moero Sector that firmly denied any involvement by Anvil in the massacre and that praised the company for the benefits it had brought to the region.
