= Dubie =

- Commune
- Location in Democratic Republic of the Congo
- Coordinates: 8°33′S 28°32′E
- Country: DR Congo
- Province: Haut-Katanga
- Territory: Pweto
- Time zone: UTC+2 (Central Africa Time)
- Climate: Aw

Dubie (also spelled Dubié) is a Town in Pweto territory, Haut-Katanga province, Democratic Republic of the Congo. The town suffered great damage during the Second Congo War, which technically ended in 2003.

Following the war, local Mai Mai militia continued to operate in the area, living off the people. Army operations against the Mai Mai began in 2005. Many of the local people were displaced to Dubie. Almost all the internally displaced people (IDPs) were living in camps, since they have a different ethnicity from the residents of the village.

A March 2006 report said that there were high mortality rates among IDPs at Dubié, increasing levels of malnutrition and insecurity. There were three camps of internally displaced persons, who began arriving in the area in November 2005 and now numbered about 16,000. The army had brought these people to the camps, and was forcing them to labor in the fields to produce food for the army. Médecins Sans Frontières reported that up to 20 people were dying each week.

Roads are in poor shape, reducing the opportunity to sell goods and increasing costs of purchases, but a project by the Concern charity achieved improvements in 2008. 45 kilometres (28 mi) of roads and 54 small bridges were rehabilitated using local labor, which helped feed money into the local economy.
