= Gédéon Kyungu =

Congolese warlord

- Born: Gédéon Kyungu Mutanga Wa Bafunkwa Kanonga; Unknown; Zaire
- Military career
- Allegiance: Mai-Mai
- Nickname: Commander Gédéon
- Commands: Mai-Mai Kata Katanga (2011–2016)
- Conflicts: Second Congo War; Katanga insurgency (surrendered)
- Criminal details
- Criminal information
- Status: Fugitive
- Conviction: Crimes against humanity
- Penalty: Death
- Escaped: 7 September 2011 (first time); 28 March 2020 (second time)
- Escape end: 11 October 2016 (first time)

Details
- Date apprehended: 16 May 2006 (first time); 11 October 2016 (second time)
- Imprisoned at: Lubumbashi (2009–2011, 2016–2020)

Gédéon Kyungu Mutanga Wa Bafunkwa Kanonga, known as Commander Gédéon, is a Congolese warlord who was notable for leading the Mai-Mai Kata Katanga between 2011 and 2016.

Kyungu was detained on 16 May 2006. He was sentenced, in 2009, alongside his wife for crimes against humanity during and after the Second Congo War. He was sentenced to death. On 7 September 2011 he escaped from a prison in Lubumbashi after members of his militia opened fire on prison guards. Authorities of the Katanga province offered a US$100,000 reward for information leading to his arrest. After his escape from prison, he formed the Mai-Mai Kata Katanga. On 11 October 2016, he surrendered himself along with 100 fighters to Congolese authorities in Malambwe in an effort to end the insecurity in the area.

Kyungu again escaped from house arrest in Lubumbashi on 28 March 2020 when his militia men attacked security forces keeping him incarcerated. Although 31 militiamen were killed and a dozen more were arrested, Kyungu managed to escape. Congolese President Félix Tshisekedi issued an order to arrest Kyungu two days after his escape.
