= Rally for Congolese Democracy–Goma =

Rebel movement faction

The Congolese Rally for Democracy–Goma (French: Rassemblement Congolais pour la Démocratie-Goma, known as RCD-Goma) was a faction of the Congolese Rally for Democracy, a rebel movement based in Goma, Democratic Republic of the Congo (DRC) during the Second Congo War (1998–2003). After the war, some members of the group continued sporadic fighting in North Kivu as the Congolese National Army (ANC). The movement also entered mainstream politics, participating in democratic elections with little success.

== Civil war ==
The RCD, operating in the east of the DRC, was a major factor in launching the Second Congo War (1998–2003), a rebellion against the government of Laurent-Désiré Kabila. At first the RCD was led by Professor Ernest Wamba dia Wamba.

A split developed in the RCD between November 1998 and May 1999 as it became clear that some Rwanda-backed members based in Goma simply wanted to remove Kabila, rather than to introduce democracy. Several attempts were made on Wamba dia Wamba's life, and in May 1999 he was ousted from the leadership.

Wamba dia Wamba established a new group based on the town of Kisangani, supported by Uganda, that became known as the RCD-Kisangani (RCD-K) or later the RCD-Liberation Movement (RCD-LM). Dr. Emile Ilunga was named leader of the mainstream Rwanda-backed faction known as the RCD-Goma from its base in the town of Goma.

By June 2000, the RCD-Goma had taken control of Kisangani, supported by Ugandan and Rwandan troops.

United Nations Security Council Resolution 1399 was adopted unanimously on 19 March 2002. The Council condemned the capture of the town of Moliro by the RCD-Goma, describing it as a major violation of the ceasefire. Stressing that no party would be allowed to make military gains during the peace process, the UN demanded that the RCD immediately withdraw from Moliro and Pweto and for all other parties to withdraw to defensive positions called for in the Harare disengagement sub-plans. Recalling that Kisangani also had to be demilitarised, the resolution reminded all parties to comply with the Ceasefire Agreement and called on Rwanda to use its influence to ensure that the RDC implemented the current resolution. The RCD said it welcomed the resolution and pledged to hand over the towns to MONUC control.

In May 2002, the RCD-Goma was harassing civilians and conducting extrajudicial executions in Kisangani. The RCD-Goma attempted to ban the Special Representative of the United Nations Secretary-General and to expel several members of the United Nations peacekeeping force (MONUC) from areas under its control, drawing another condemnation from the UN Security Council. On 21 June 2002, child soldiers of the pro-government Mai Mai militia entered Pweto, and RDC officials hastily left. Later that month the Rwandan-backed RDC-Goma forces again took control of Pweto, threatening the peace agreement under which Pweto was declared a demilitarized zone.

Towards the end of the war, the RCD-Goma was thought to have between 20,000 and 30,000 troops. The RCD-Goma did not provide any security to civilians within the territory they controlled. Their troops, mainly of Banyamulenge ethnic group (Tutsis originally from Rwanda), committed abuses against non-combatants. RCD-Goma officials demanded that their home constituents produce a certain number of recruits, and reportedly recruited children by force.

== Post-war ongoing conflict ==
The civil war officially ended with a power-sharing agreement between the government and rebel movements. RCD-Goma Chairman Adolphe Onusumba Yemba signed a peace pact in Sun City, South Africa, on 2 April 2003. Later that month the RCD/Goma launched a military offensive against the RCD-K/ML positions, occupying more than two thirds of the Lubero Territory. The advance was halted after signature of an agreement in Bujumbura on 19 June 2003. Following the cease-fire, the RCD-Goma continued to undertake offensives, drawing international condemnation for violating the cease-fire and threatening the political process. Under the terms of the ceasefire the RCD/Goma had to withdraw to their former territory. However Armée Nationale Congolaise (ANC) troops, the armed forces of the RCD-Goma, continued to occupy the city of Kanyabayonga along with local mostly Hutu militias created and directed by the North Kivu Governor Eugene Serufuli.

In September 2003, the spokesman of the newly formed Transitional Government of the Democratic Republic of the Congo, Vital Kamerhe, accused members of the RCD-Goma of fomenting a new rebellion. He based this on a copy of internal RCD-Goma correspondence that had been leaked to the media. The correspondence said President Joseph Kabila was continuing to support the Interahamwe, a group of Rwandan Hutu militias who fled to Congo after having played a major role in the 1994 Rwandan genocide. On 10 and 11 October 2004, hundreds of mostly young students from primary and secondary schools took to the streets of the city of Kanyabayonga to protest against the increase in crimes against civilians by RCD-Goma forces. ANC troops violently broke up the demonstration and instituted a reign of terror.

Laurent Nkunda was an officer in the RCD-Goma. In 2003, with the official end of that war, Nkunda joined the new integrated national army of the transitional government as a colonel and was promoted to general in 2004. He soon rejected the authority of the government and retreated with some of the RCD-Goma troops to the Masisi forests in Nord Kivu. This was the start of the long-running Kivu conflict. A warrant for Nkunda's arrest on charges of war crimes was issued in September 2005. In January 2006, his forces attacked and occupied several towns in Rutshuru Territory in North Kivu province including Tongo, Bunagana and Rutshuru. The troops looted the towns and raped or killed civilians who were unable to escape. In February 2006, Human Rights Watch accused the government of doing nothing to capture Nkunda despite knowing of his location.

== Democratic process ==
Under the power-sharing accord that ended the civil war, Kabila remained president, with four vice-presidents. One vice-president came from Kabila's political movement, one from the unarmed political opposition, one from the rebel Movement for the Liberation of the Congo, backed by Uganda and controlling much of the north of the country, and one from the RCD-Goma. Azarias Ruberwa Manywa, secretary-general of the RCD-Goma, was named his movement's candidate for vice-president in a two-year national transition government. The RCD-Goma held 94 out of 500 seats in the National Assembly.

Ruberwa ran for President in the July 2006 general elections, coming sixth with only 1.7% of the vote. The RCD won 15 seats in the new 500-seat Assembly. In the 19 January 2007 Senate elections, the party won seven out of 108 seats.
