= Ankoro =

- Location in Democratic Republic of the Congo
- Coordinates: 6.75°S 26.95°E
- Country: DR Congo
- Province: Tanganyika
- Time zone: UTC+2 (Central Africa Time)
- Climate: Aw

Ankoro is a town in Tanganyika province, Democratic Republic of the Congo. It lies on the west bank of the Lualaba River opposite the point where it is joined by the Luvua River.

== Civil war ==
Towards the end of the Second Congo War (1998-2003) the community was in a desperate state. In November 2002 there had been fighting between government forces in Ankoro and the rebel forces who held the territory across the river. The people fled into the bush around the town, where they had to scavenge for food. 100 people were killed and more than 3,000 homes were burned down. Food stored in the town was looted by soldiers and there were no seeds to plant at the start of the rainy season. Over 40% were malnourished. In an attempt to alleviate the situation, in March 2003 World Vision organized a shipment of 626.4 metric tonnes of maize, oil and salt. The aid would be taken by rail from Lubumbashi to Bukama, then by river for three days to Ankoro.
