= Moliro =

- Location within Democratic Republic of the Congo
- Coordinates: 8.220962°S 30.566497°E
- Country: DR Congo
- Province: Tanganyika
- Time zone: UTC+2 (Central Africa Time)

Moliro is a community in the east of the Democratic Republic of the Congo beside Lake Tanganyika on the border with Zambia. It is in Tanganyika province.

The Congo Free State Enclave of Moliro was founded in 1902, with its own fort and detachment of soldiers, one of three such military divisions in northeastern Katanga.

During the negotiations to end the Second Congo War (1998-2003), in March 2002 the rebel group Rassemblement Congolais pour la Démocratie (RCD-Goma) attacked and captured Moliro. The UN Security Council demanded that "RCD-Goma troops withdraw immediately and without condition from Moliro and ... all parties withdraw to the defensive positions called for in the Harare disengagement sub-plans". The talks were suspended for two weeks until the RCD evacuated the village.
