= Katanga Province =

Katanga Province Province du Katanga
- Former province
- Congo provinces in 1914 (Katanga is the pink area).
- Coordinates: 09°S 26°E
- Country: DR Congo
- Established: 1966
- Dissolved: 2015
- Capital: Lubumbashi
- Largest city: Lubumbashi

Area
  - Total: 496,871 km^{2} (191,843 sq mi)

Population (2010 est.)
  - Total: 5,608,683
  - Density: 11.2880/km^{2} (29.2358/sq mi)
- Demonym: Katangese
- Official: French
- National: Swahili
- Other: English

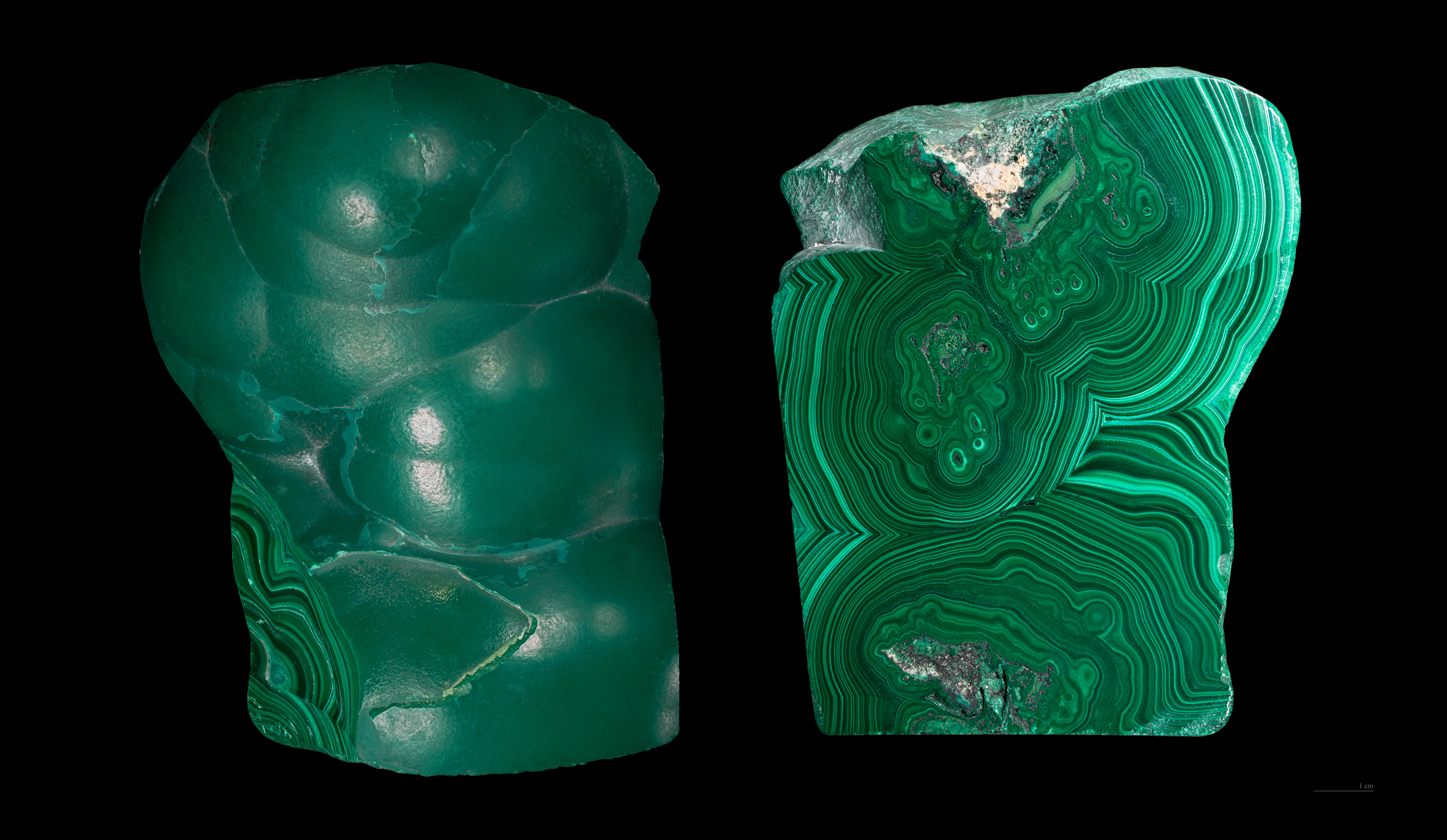
Malachite specimen, showing the original botryoidal form and a polished face of the opposite half of the specimen. Mines in the vicinity of Kolwezi supply much of the polishing-grade malachite in the world.

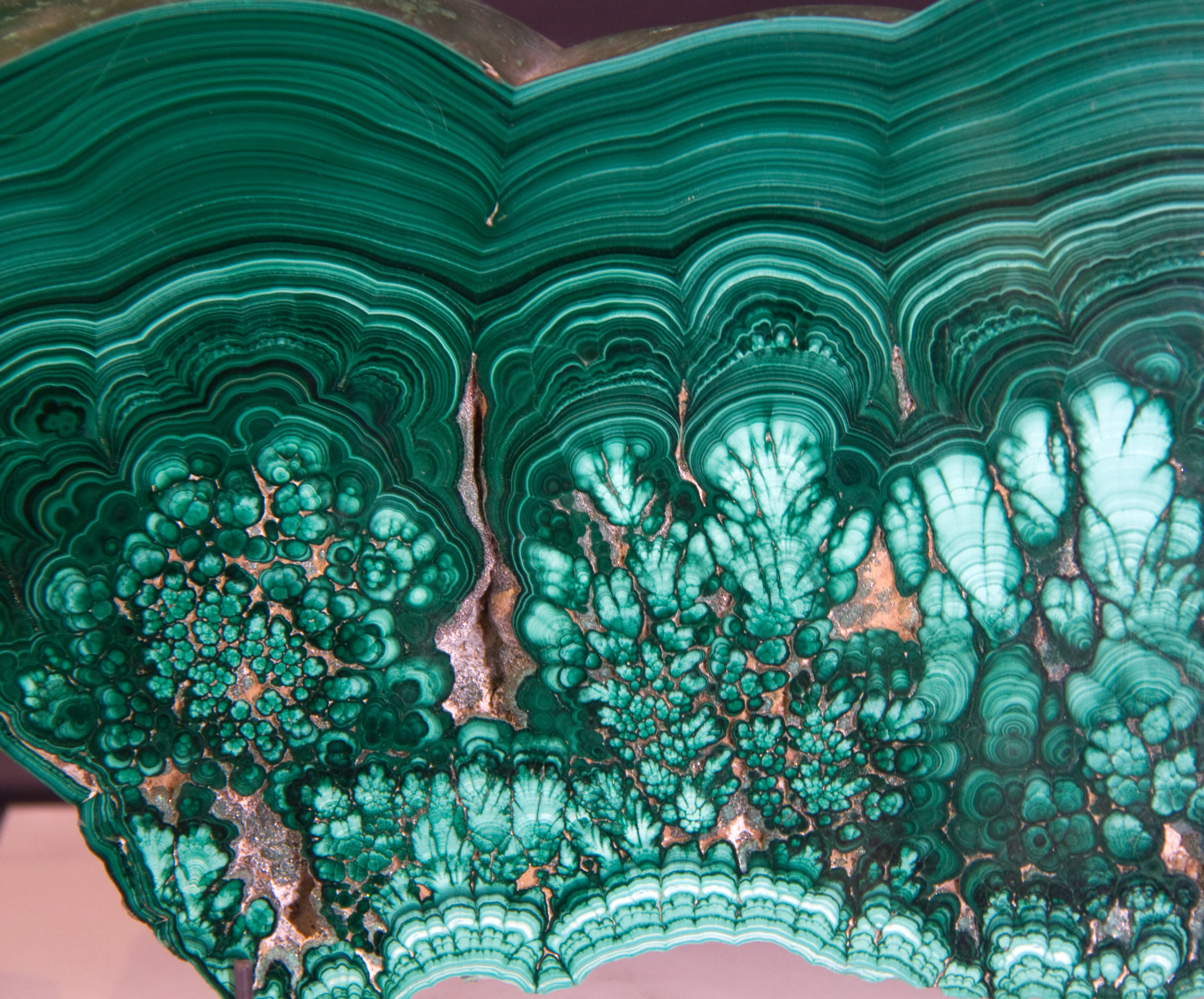
Another malachite specimen from Katanga, on display at the Royal Ontario Museum.

Katanga was one of the four large provinces created in the Belgian Congo in 1914. It was one of the eleven provinces of the Democratic Republic of the Congo between 1966 and 2015, when it was split into the Tanganyika, Haut-Lomami, Lualaba, and Haut-Katanga provinces. Between 1971 and 1997 (during the rule of Mobutu Sese Seko when Congo was known as Zaire), its official name was Shaba Province.

Katanga's area encompassed 497,000 square kilometres (192,000 sq mi). Farming and ranching are carried out on the Katanga Plateau. The eastern part of the province is a rich mining region which supplies cobalt, copper, tin, radium, uranium, and diamonds. Its capital, Lubumbashi, is the second-largest city in the Congo.

== History ==
Copper mining in Katanga dates back over 1,000 years, and mines in the region were producing standard-sized ingots of copper for international transport by the end of the 10th century CE.

In the 1890s, the province was beleaguered from the south by Cecil Rhodes' Northern Rhodesia, and from the north by the Belgian Congo, the personal possession of King Leopold II of Belgium. Msiri, the King of the Yeke Kingdom, held out against both, but eventually Katanga was subsumed by the Belgian Congo.

After 1900, the Societe Generale de Belgique practically controlled all of the mining in the province through Union Minière du Haut Katanga (UMHK). This included uranium, radium, copper, cobalt, zinc, cadmium, germanium, manganese, silver, gold, and tin.

In 1915, a deposit of pitchblende and other uranium minerals of a higher grade than had ever been found before anywhere in the world and higher than any found since were discovered at Shinkolobwe. The discovery was kept secret by UMHK. After World War I ended a factory was built at Olen; the secrecy was lifted at the end of 1922 with the announcement of the production of the first gram of radium from the pitchblende. By the start of World War II, the mining companies "constituted a state within the Belgian Congo". The Shinkolobwe mine near Jadotville (now Likasi) was at the centre of the Manhattan Project.

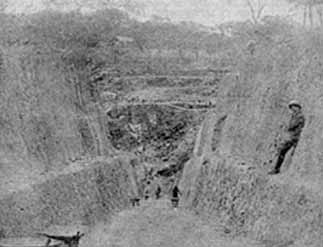
Mine de Shinkolobwe. The uranium for the Manhattan Project and the Atomic bombing of Hiroshima and Nagasaki came from Shinkolobwe mine.

In 1960, after the Democratic Republic of the Congo (then called Republic of the Congo) gained independence from Belgium, the UMHK, Moise Tshombe and Godefroid Munongo supported the secession of Katanga province from the Congo. This was supported by Belgium but opposed by the Congolese Prime Minister Patrice Lumumba. This led to the assassination of Lumumba and the Katanga Crisis (or "Congo Crisis"), which lasted from 1960 to 1965. The breakaway State of Katanga existed from 1960 to 1963, then was reintegrated.

In 2005, the new constitution specified that Katanga was to be split up into separately administered provinces.

Militias such as Mai Mai Kata Katanga led by Gédéon Kyungu Mutanga fought for Katanga to secede, and his group briefly took over the provincial capital Lubumbashi in 2013.

In 2015, Katanga Province was split into the constitutional provinces of Tanganyika, Haut-Lomami, Lualaba, and Haut-Katanga. The province officially ended on 16 July 2015, during a session of its provincial assembly.

== Economy ==
Copper mining is an important part of the economy of Katanga province. Cobalt mining by individual contractors is also prevalent. A number of reasons have been advanced for the failure of the vast mineral wealth of the province to increase the overall standard of living. The local provincial budget was US$440 million in 2011.

Lubumbashi, the mining capital of the Democratic Republic of Congo, is a hub for many of the country's biggest mining companies. The Democratic Republic of Congo produces "more than 3 percent of the world’s copper and half its cobalt, most of which comes from Katanga".

Major mining concessions include Tilwezembe and Kalukundi.

=== Mining companies ===
- Gécamines, (La Générale des Carrières et des Mines, the former UMHK), the state-owned copper-cobalt mining company, had monopoly concessions in the province.
- Katanga Mining Ltd TSX:KAT operates a major mining complex in Katanga province, producing refined copper and cobalt with the "potential of becoming Africa’s largest copper producer and the world’s largest cobalt producer". Katanga Mining Ltd is majority-owned by Swiss commodity trader Glencore DCC. A joint venture of Katanga Mining (75%) and Gécamines (25%) began mining Tilwezembe, an open-pit copper and cobalt mine, in 2007.

== Geography ==
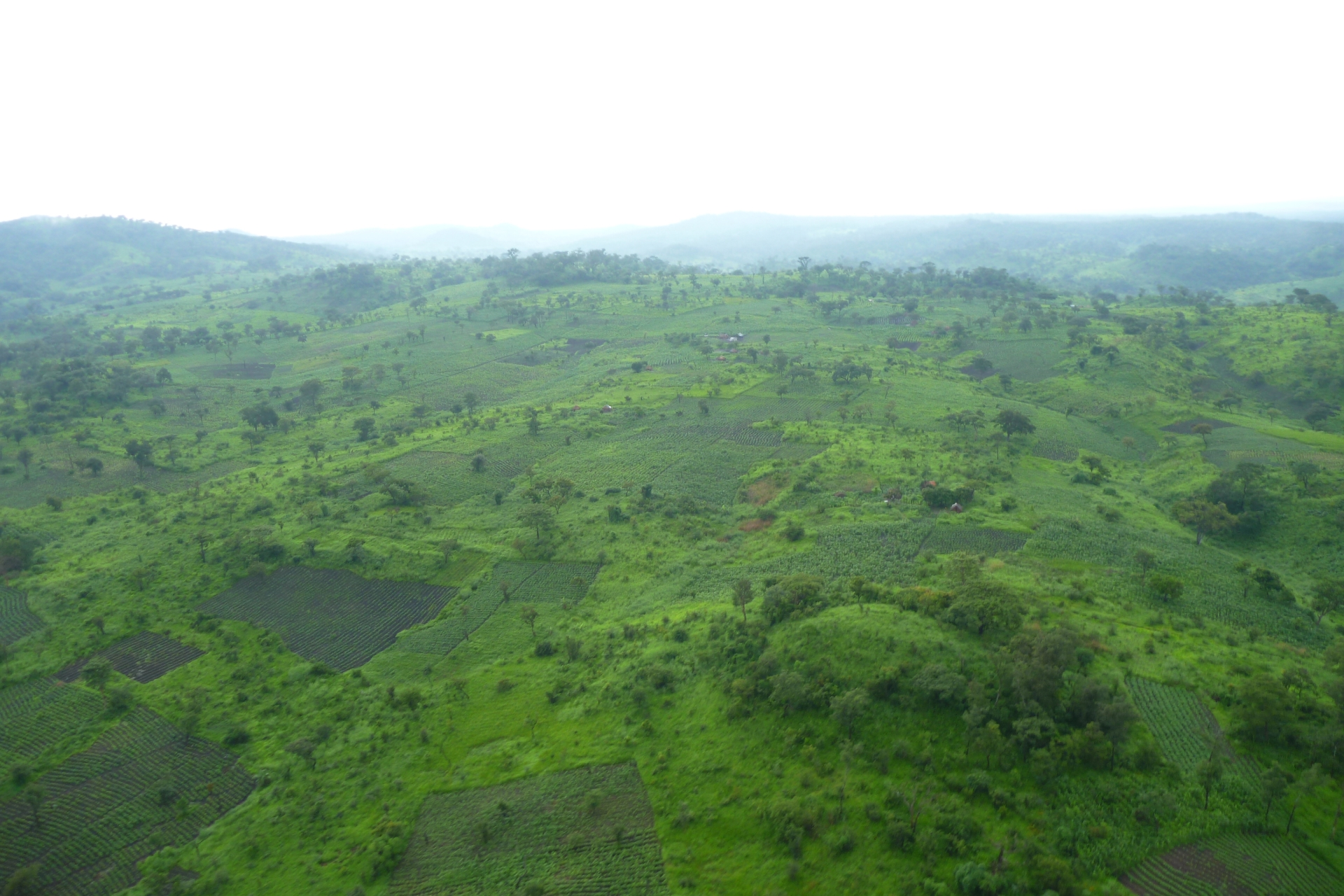
Hills of Katanga

The province bordered Angola and formed the entire Congolese border with Zambia. It also bordered Tanzania – although on Lake Tanganyika rather than on land. Katanga has a wet and dry season. Rainfall is about 1,200 mm (49 in).

The province was divided in 2015 into five successor provinces, based on the districts of Katanga at that time:

Lualaba Province

Lomami Province

Haut-Lomami Province

Haut-Katanga Province

Tanganyika Province

== Education and medical care ==
The University of Lubumbashi, located in the northern part of Lubumbashi city, is the largest university in the province and one of the largest in the country.

TESOL, the English Language School of Lubumbashi, is a secondary school that serves the expatriate community. It was founded in 1987 on the grounds of the French School, Lycée Français Blaise Pascal, which suspended operations in 1991 with a new French School starting in 2009.

Katanga province has the highest rate of infant mortality in the world, with 184 of 1000 babies born expected to die before the age of five.

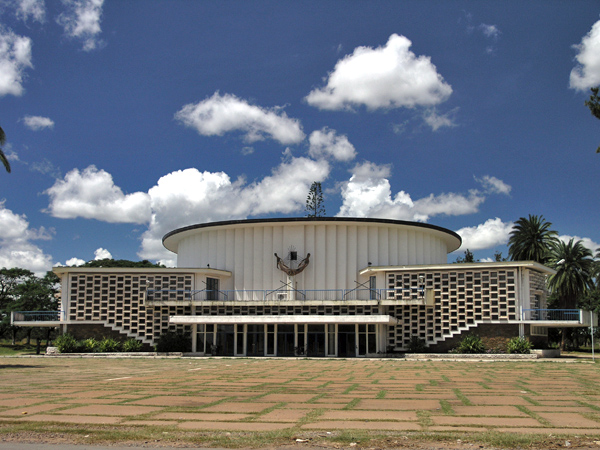
Provincial assembly building of Katanga in Lubumbashi

== Transportation ==
The Congo Railway provides Katanga Province with limited railway service centered on Lubumbashi. Reliability is limited. Lubumbashi International Airport is located northeast of Lubumbashi. In April 2014, a train derailment killed 63 people.

== People ==
- Laurent-Désiré Kabila, former president of the Democratic Republic of the Congo
- Moise Tshombe, former president of the breakaway State of Katanga
- Barbara Kanam, popular singer
- Frédéric Kibassa Maliba, former opposition leader and president of UDPS
- Odilon Kafitwe wa pa Bowa, former national minister of Zaire and leader of UFERI
- Lunda Bululu, former prime minister of Zaire
- Godefroid Munongo, politician

== See also ==
- Central African Copperbelt
- Congo Free State
- Congo Pedicle
- List of governors of Katanga
- Lubumbashi history and timeline
- Msiri
- Stairs Expedition to Katanga
- State of Katanga
