= List of cities and towns in the Democratic Republic of the Congo =

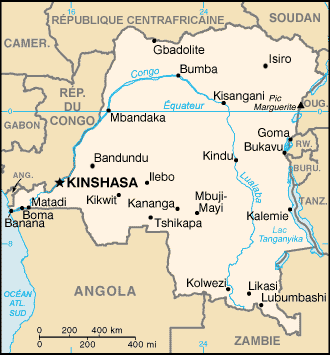
Map of DR Congo

This is a list of places, mostly cities and towns, in the Democratic Republic of the Congo without regard to their official status.

== Administrative units ==
Human settlements can be one of the following subdivisions of the DR Congo: cities, communes, groupings (fr. groupements) and villages; or may not be an administrative division at all.

== Towns and cities ==
The national capital, Kinshasa, and the provincial capitals are shown in bold face.

Name	Population (2010 est.)	Coordinates	Province	Former name
Aba			Haut-Uele	
Aketi	40,507	2°44′N 23°47′E	Bas-Uele	
Ango	8,381	4°02′N 25°52′E	Bas-Uele	
Aru	29,801	2°52′N 30°51′E	Ituri	
Bafwasende	14,504	1°05′N 27°16′E	Tshopo	
Bagata	18,938	3°44′S 17°57′E	Kwilu	
Bakwa-Kalonji	69,619	6°11′S 23°23′E	Kasaï	
Balamba	52,860	12°47′S 28°39′E	Haut-Katanga	
Bambesa	14,959	3°28′N 25°43′E	Bas-Uele	
Banana			Kongo Central	
**Bandundu**	137,460	3°19′S 17°23′E	Kwilu	Banningville
Baraka	115,289	4°06′S 29°05′E	South Kivu	
Basankusu	27,492	1°14′N 19°48′E	Équateur	
Basoko (Basoko-Bandu)	50,352	1°14′N 23°35′E	Tshopo	
Befale	3,723	0°28′N 20°58′E	Tshuapa	
Beni	95,407	0°29′N 29°27′E	North Kivu	
Bikoro	7,128	0°45′S 18°07′E	Équateur	
Binga	64,639	2°24′N 20°25′E	Mongala	
**Boende**	33,765	0°13′S 20°52′E	Tshuapa	
Bokoro		2°48′S 18°14′E	Mai-Ndombe	
Bokungu (Bokungo)	7,829	0°41′S 22°19′E	Tshuapa	
Bolobo	31,735	2°10′S 16°14′E	Mai-Ndombe	
Bolomba	4,252	0°29′N 19°12′E	Équateur	
Boma	167,326	5°51′S 13°03′E	Kongo Central	
Bomongo	4,784	1°22′N 18°21′E	Équateur	
Bondo	18,118	3°49′N 23°40′E	Bas-Uele	
Bongandanga	3,648	1°31′N 21°03′E	Mongala	
Bosobolo	12,932	4°11′N 19°53′E	Nord-Ubangi	
Budjala	21,259	2°39′N 19°42′E	Sud-Ubangi	
Bukama (Bukama-Kibanda)	75,814	9°13′S 25°50′E	Haut-Lomami	
**Bukavu**	1,012,053	2°31′S 28°50′E	South Kivu	Costermansville
Bulungu	54,880	4°33′S 18°36′E	Kwilu	
Bumba	103,328	2°11′N 22°28′E	Mongala	
**Bunia**	327,837	1°34′N 30°14′E	Ituri	
Businga (Mombombo)	32,590	3°20′N 20°52′E	Nord-Ubangi	
**Buta**	53,401	2°49′N 24°44′E	Bas-Uele	
Butembo	204,452	0°08′N 29°17′E	North Kivu	
Dekese	3,241	3°27′S 21°24′E	Kasaï	
Demba	21,019	5°31′S 22°16′E	Kasaï-Central	
Dibaya	3,857	6°31′S 22°52′E	Kasaï-Central	
Dibaya-Lubue (Dibaya-Lubwe)	37,390	4°09′S 19°52′E	Kwilu	
Dilolo	17,446	9°13′S 25°07′E	Lualaba	
Dilunga	23,804		Kasaï-Oriental	
Dimbelenge	3,815	5°33′S 23°07′E	Kasaï-Central	
Djugu	27,112	1°55′N 30°30′E	Ituri	
Dungu	26,894	3°37′N 28°34′E	Haut-Uele	
Feshi	7,591	6°07′S 18°10′E	Kwango	
Fizi	12,494	4°18′S 28°56′E	South Kivu	
Fungurume	32,399	10°37′S 26°18′E	Lualaba	
Gandajika (Ngandajika)	140,556	6°44′S 23°58′E	Lomami	
**Gbadolite**	48,083	4°17′N 21°01′E	Nord-Ubangi	
**Gemena**	132,971	3°16′N 19°46′E	Sud-Ubangi	
**Goma**	377,112	1°41′S 29°13′E	North Kivu	
Gungu	22,946	5°48′S 19°20′E	Kwilu	
Gwane		4°43′N 25°49′E	Bas-Uele	
Idiofa	58,637	5°02′S 19°36′E	Kwilu	
Idjwi	4,567	2°09′S 29°04′E	South Kivu	
Ikela	15,214	1°11′S 23°16′E	Tshuapa	
Ilebo (Port-Franqui)	72,059	4°19′S 20°37′E	Kasaï	
Inga	10,417	5°39′S 13°39′E	Kongo Central	
Ingende	3,951	0°15′S 18°57′E	Équateur	
Inkisi (Kisantu)	77,797	5°08′S 15°04′E	Kongo Central	
**Inongo**	46,657	1°56′S 18°17′E	Mai-Ndombe	
Irumu	10,387	1°27′N 29°52′E	Ituri	
Isangi	11,608	0°51′S 18°22′E	Tshopo	
**Isiro**	182,900	2°46′N 27°37′E	Haut-Uele	
Kabalo	58,332	6°03′S 26°55′E	Tanganyika	
Kabambare	10,375	4°42′S 27°43′E	Maniema	
Kabeya-Kamwanga (Kenankuna)	30,027	6°16′S 22°38′E	Kasaï-Oriental	
**Kabinda**	192,364	6°08′S 24°29′E	Lomami	
Kabongo	13,979	7°19′S 25°35′E	Haut-Lomami	
Kahemba	18,061	5°15′S 19°42′E	Kwango	
**Kalemie**	92,400	5°55′S 29°10′E	Tanganyika	Albertville
Kalima (Kamisuku)	47,030	2°31′S 26°26′E	Maniema	
Kalo		4°07′S 19°14′E	Kwilu	
Kambove	71,756	10°52′S 26°36′E	Haut-Katanga	
**Kamina**	143,753	8°44′S 25°01′E	Haut-Lomami	
Kamituga	13,361	3°04′S 28°11′E	South Kivu	
Kampene	14,819	3°36′S 26°40′E	Maniema	
**Kananga**	967,007	5°53′S 22°24′E	Kasaï-Central	Luluabourg
Kaniama	57,507	7°34′S 24°10′E	Haut-Lomami	
Kanteba (Kateba)	17,314	7°20′S 24°37′E	Tanganyika	
Kanyabayonga	29,936	0°43′S 29°10′E	North Kivu	
Kapanga	2,287	11°30′S 26°45′E	Lualaba	
Kasaji			Lualaba	
Kasangulu	30,724	4°35′S 15°11′E	Kongo Central	
Kasenga	21,400	10°38′S 26°46′E	Haut-Katanga	
Kasongo	54,743	4°27′S 26°40′E	Maniema	
Kasongo-Lunda	22,860	6°29′S 16°50′E	Kwango	
Katako-Kombe	7,592	3°24′S 24°25′E	Sankuru	
Katanda	29,146	6°20′S 23°54′E	Kasai-Oriental	
Katwa	60,591	0°06′N 29°19′E	North Kivu	
Kayna	34,653	0°37′S 29°10′E	North Kivu	
Kazumba	4,109	6°25′S 22°02′E	Kasaï-Central	
**Kenge**	42,884	4°50′S 16°54′E	Kwango	
Kibombo	17,527	3°57′S 25°59′E	Maniema	
Kikwit	370,328	5°02′S 18°49′E	Kwilu	
Kimpese	53,660	5°33′S 14°26′E	Kongo Central	
**Kindu**	163,587	2°57′S 25°55′E	Maniema	
**Kinshasa**	8,900,721	4°19′S 15°19′E	Kinshasa	Léopoldville
Kinzau-Mvuete (Kinzau-Vuete)	17,870	5°29′S 13°17′E	Kongo Central	
Kipamba (Kikondja)	30,026	8°12′S 26°25′E	Haut-Lomami	
Kipushi	121,831	11°46′S 27°15′E	Haut-Katanga	
Kiri	14,033	1°27′S 19°00′E	Mai-Ndombe	
Kirumba	35,290	1°05′S 29°17′E	North Kivu	
**Kisangani**	868,672	0°32′N 25°11′E	Tshopo	Stanleyville
Kitona			Kongo Central	
Kituku	43,460	1°06′N 29°58′E	Ituri	
Kole (Haut-Lomami)	4,548	8°01′S 25°33′E	Haut-Lomami	
**Kolwezi**	451,168	10°42′S 25°40′E	Lualaba	
Kongolo	62,455	5°23′S 26°59′E	Tanganyika	
Kungu	7,738	2°47′N 19°12′E	Sud-Ubangi	
Kutu	37,405	2°44′S 18°09′E	Mai-Ndombe	
Kwamouth		3°11′N 16°13′E	Mai-Ndombe	
Libenge	23,962	3°23′N 18°23′E	Sud-Ubangi	
Likasi	422,535	10°59′S 26°44′E	Haut-Katanga	Jadotville
**Lisala**	79,235	2°08′N 21°31′E	Mongala	
Lodja	61,689	3°29′S 23°25′E	Sankuru	
Lomela	9,800	2°18′S 23°17′E	Kasai-Oriental	
Lubao (Sentery)	26,694	5°23′S 25°45′E	Lomami	
Lubefu	2,028	4°43′S 24°25′E	Sankuru	
Lubero	28,293	0°10′S 29°13′E	North Kivu	
Lubudi	21,176	9°57′S 25°58′E	Lualaba	
**Lubumbashi**	1,630,186	11°40′S 27°29′E	Haut-Katanga	Elizabethville
Lubutu	7,822	0°44′S 26°35′E	Maniema	
Luebo	29,167	5°21′S 21°25′E	Kasaï	
Luiza	15,259	7°12′S 22°25′E	Kasaï-Central	
Lukolela	15,230	1°03′S 17°12′E	Équateur	
Lukula	31,394	5°23′S 12°57′E	Kongo Central	
Lukunga mputu	31,394	5°23′S 12°57′E	Kongo Central	
Luozi	13,258	4°57′S 14°08′E	Kongo Central	
Lupatapata (Luhatahata)	18,444	4°40′S 24°17′E	Kasai-Oriental	
Luputa	37,848	7°10′S 23°42′E	Lomami	
**Lusambo**	32,340	4°58′S 23°26′E	Sankuru	
Lwambo (Luambo)	12,652	10°49′S 26°47′E	Haut-Katanga	
Mahagi	18,743	2°18′N 30°59′E	Ituri	
Malemba-Nkulu	28,472	8°02′S 26°48′E	Haut-Lomami	
Mangaï	43,155	4°02′S 19°32′E	Kwilu	
Mangina	37,594	0°34′N 29°19′E	North Kivu	
Mankanza	18,134	1°41′N 19°10′E	Équateur	
Manono	56,048	7°18′S 27°27′E	Tanganyika	
Masi-Manimba	30,542	4°46′S 17°55′E	Kwilu	
Masisi	6,502	1°24′S 28°49′E	North Kivu	
**Matadi**	291,338	5°49′S 13°29′E	Kongo Central	
**Mbandaka** (Coquilhatville)	324,236	0°02′N 18°16′E	Équateur	
Mbanza-Ngungu (Thysville)	97,037	5°15′S 14°52′E	Kongo Central	
**Mbuji-Mayi** (Bakwanga)	1,559,073	6°08′S 23°35′E	Kasai-Oriental	
Miabi	55,328	6°12′S 23°23′E	Kasai-Oriental	
Mitwaba	4,116	8°38′S 27°20′E	Haut-Katanga	
Moba (Baudouinville)	58,324	7°04′S 29°43′E	Tanganyika	
Mobayi-Mbongo	5,413	4°18′N 21°11′E	Nord-Ubangi	
Mokambo	22,481	12°25′S 28°21′E	Haut-Katanga	
Mongbwalu	29,672	1°57′N 30°02′E	Ituri	
Monkoto	8,640	1°38′S 20°39′E	Tshuapa	
Muanda (Moanda)	86,896	5°56′S 12°21′E	Kongo Central	
Mulongo	57,775	7°50′S 27°00′E	Haut-Lomami	
Mushie	42,409	3°01′S 16°55′E	Mai-Ndombe	
Mutshatsha	6,615	10°39′S 24°27′E	Lualaba	
Mweka	55,155	4°50′S 21°34′E	Kasaï	
Mwene-Ditu	190,718	7°00′S 23°26′E	Lomami	
Niangara	13,504	3°42′N 27°52′E	Haut-Uele	
Nioki	40,979	2°42′S 17°40′E	Mai-Ndombe	
Nyunzu	40,460	5°57′S 28°01′E	Tanganyika	
Oicha	50,559	0°42′N 29°31′E	North Kivu	
Opala	15,569	1°17′N 27°16′E	Tshopo	
Oshwe	21,681	3°24′S 19°30′E	Mai-Ndombe	
Poko	10,873	3°09′N 26°53′E	Bas-Uele	
Popokabaka	12,564	5°42′S 16°35′E	Kwango	
Punia	18,796	1°27′S 26°25′E	Maniema	
Pweto	24,767	8°28′S 28°54′E	Haut-Katanga	
Rutshuru	56,066	1°11′S 29°27′E	North Kivu	
Sakania	9,650	12°45′S 28°34′E	Haut-Katanga	
Sandoa	9,698	9°41′S 22°52′E	Lualaba	
Sedzo		4°02′S 19°11′E	Kwilu	
Seke-Banza	6,015	5°20′S 13°16′E	Kongo Central	
Shabunda	20,761	2°42′S 27°20′E	South Kivu	
Shinkolobwe			Haut-Katanga	
Songololo	12,382	5°42′S 14°02′E	Kongo Central	
Tshela	38,845	5°00′S 12°57′E	Kongo Central	
**Tshikapa**	524,293	6°25′S 20°46′E	Kasaï	
Tshilenge	80,348	6°15′S 23°46′E	Kasai-Oriental	
Tshimbulu	19,384	6°29′S 22°51′E	Kasaï-Central	
Ubundu	13,332	0°21′S 25°29′E	Tshopo	
Uvira	337,488	3°22′S 29°08′E	South Kivu	
Vivi			Kongo Central	
Walikale	9,903	1°25′S 28°04′E	North Kivu	
Walungu	14,648	2°38′S 28°40′E	South Kivu	
Wamba	17,651	2°08′N 27°59′E	Haut-Uele	
Watsa	31,978	3°02′N 29°32′E	Haut-Uele	
Yahuma	4,857	1°05′N 23°13′E	Tshopo	
Yakoma	11,720	4°06′N 22°26′E	Nord-Ubangi	
Yangambi	40,932	0°46′N 24°26′E	Tshopo	
Yumbi		1°54′N 16°33′E	Mai-Ndombe	
Zaba		4°20′S 18°15′E	Kwilu	
Zongo	32,516	4°21′N 18°36′E	Sud-Ubangi	

== Images ==
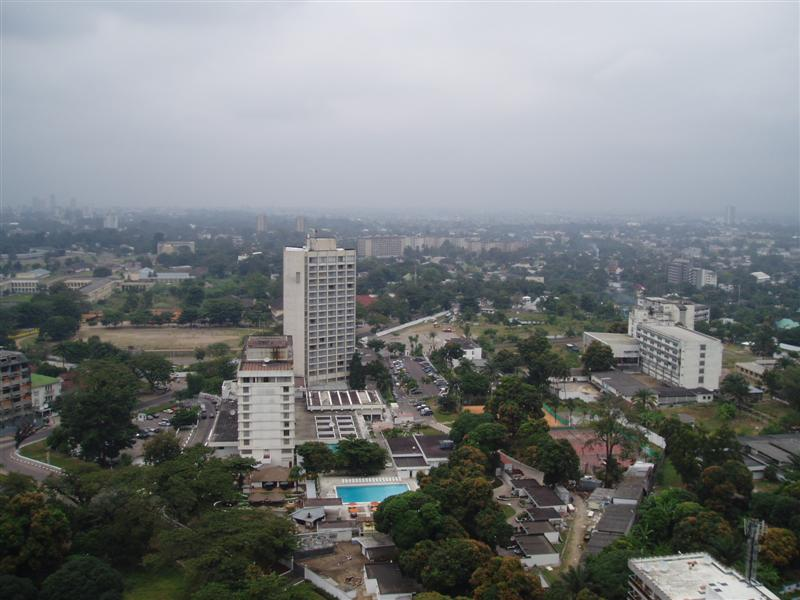
Kinshasa

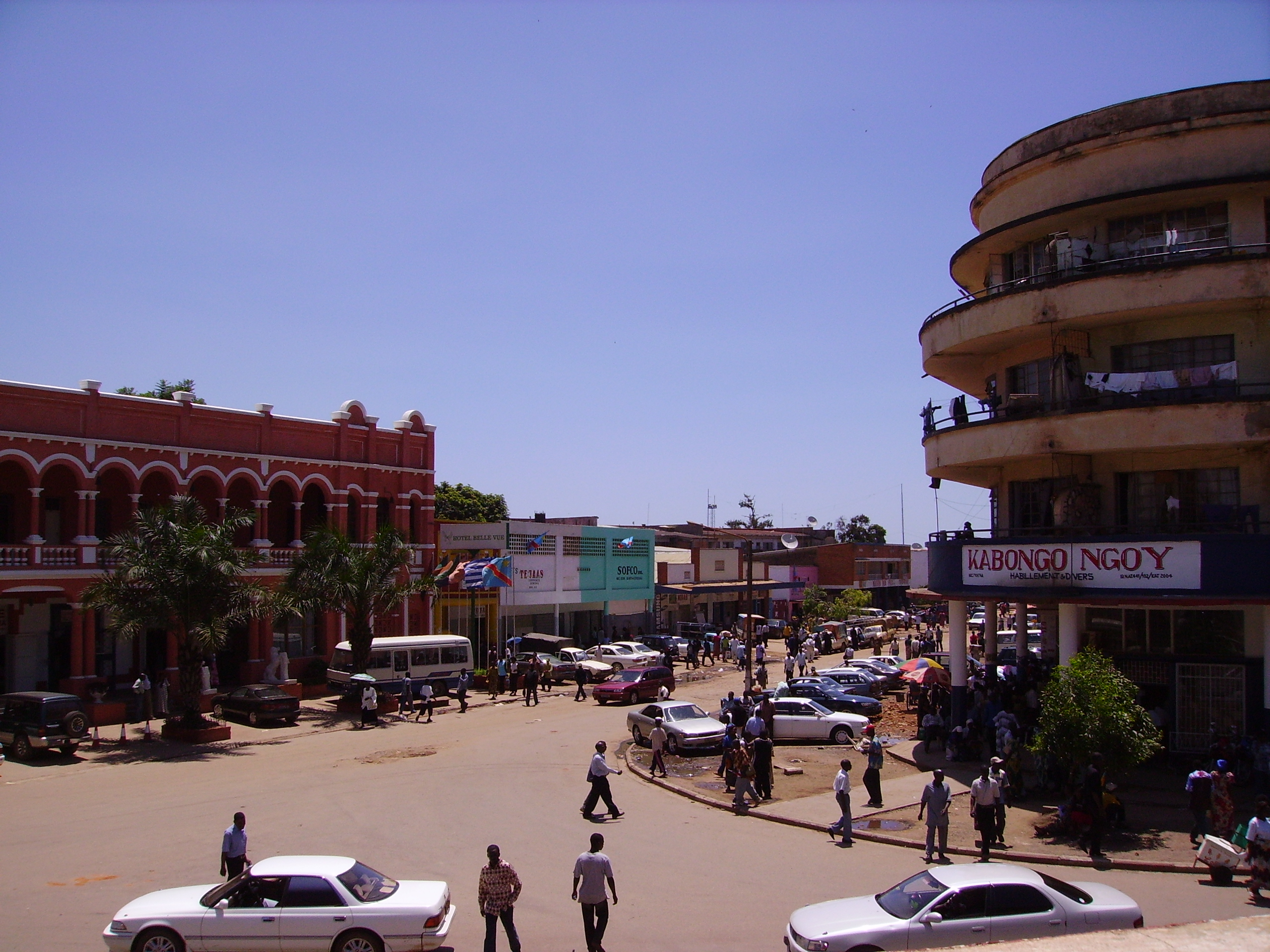
Lubumbashi

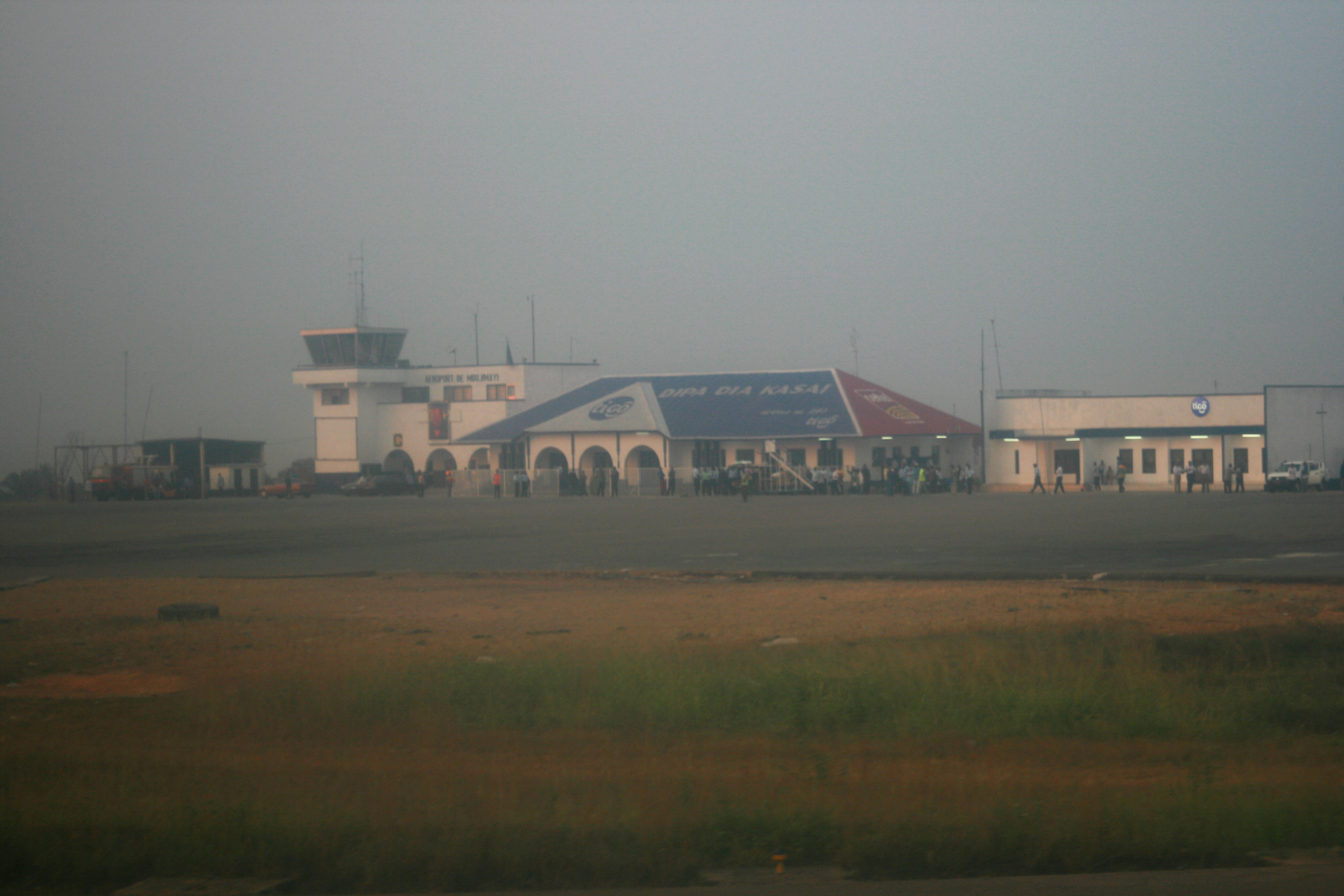
Mbuji-Mayi

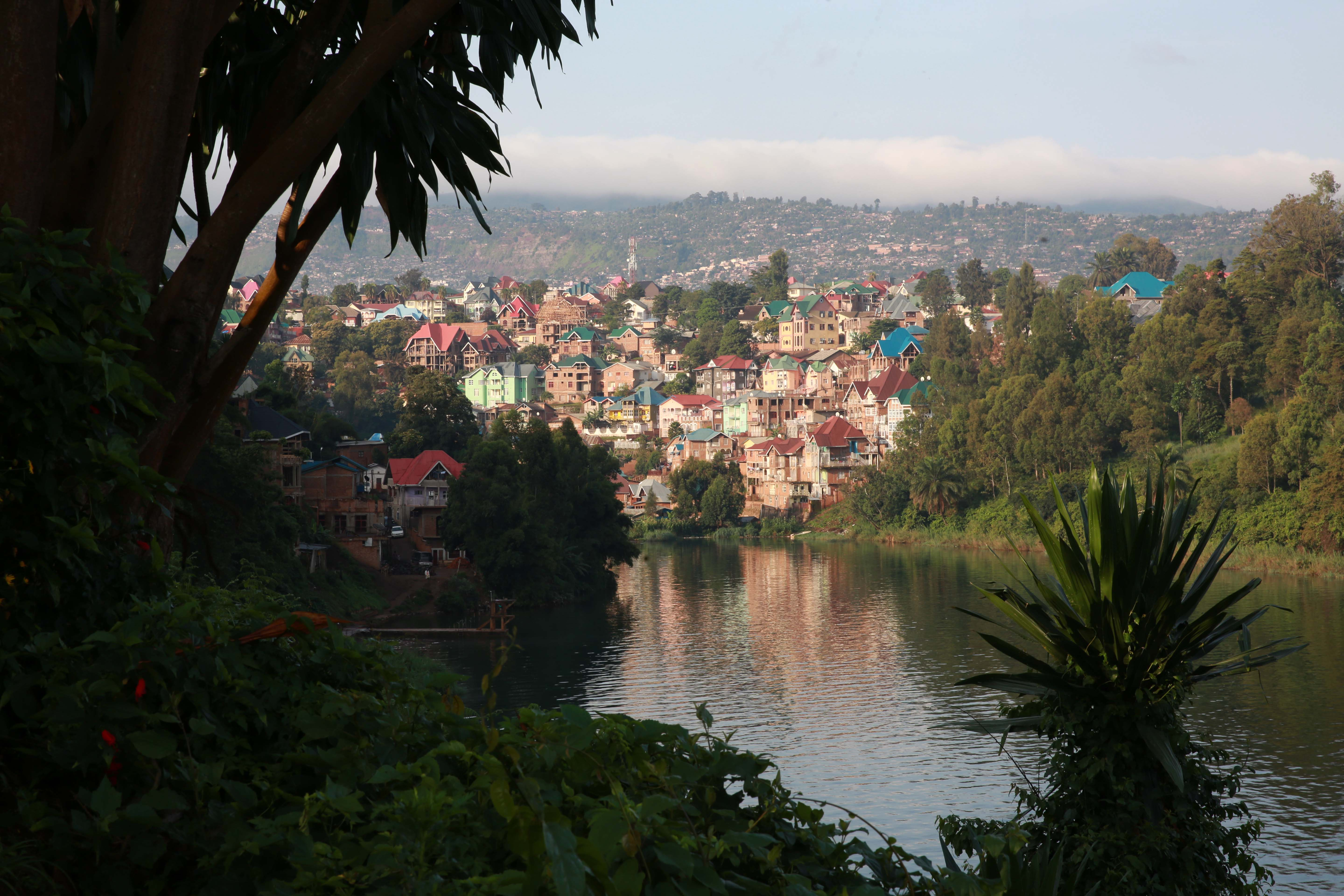
Bukavu

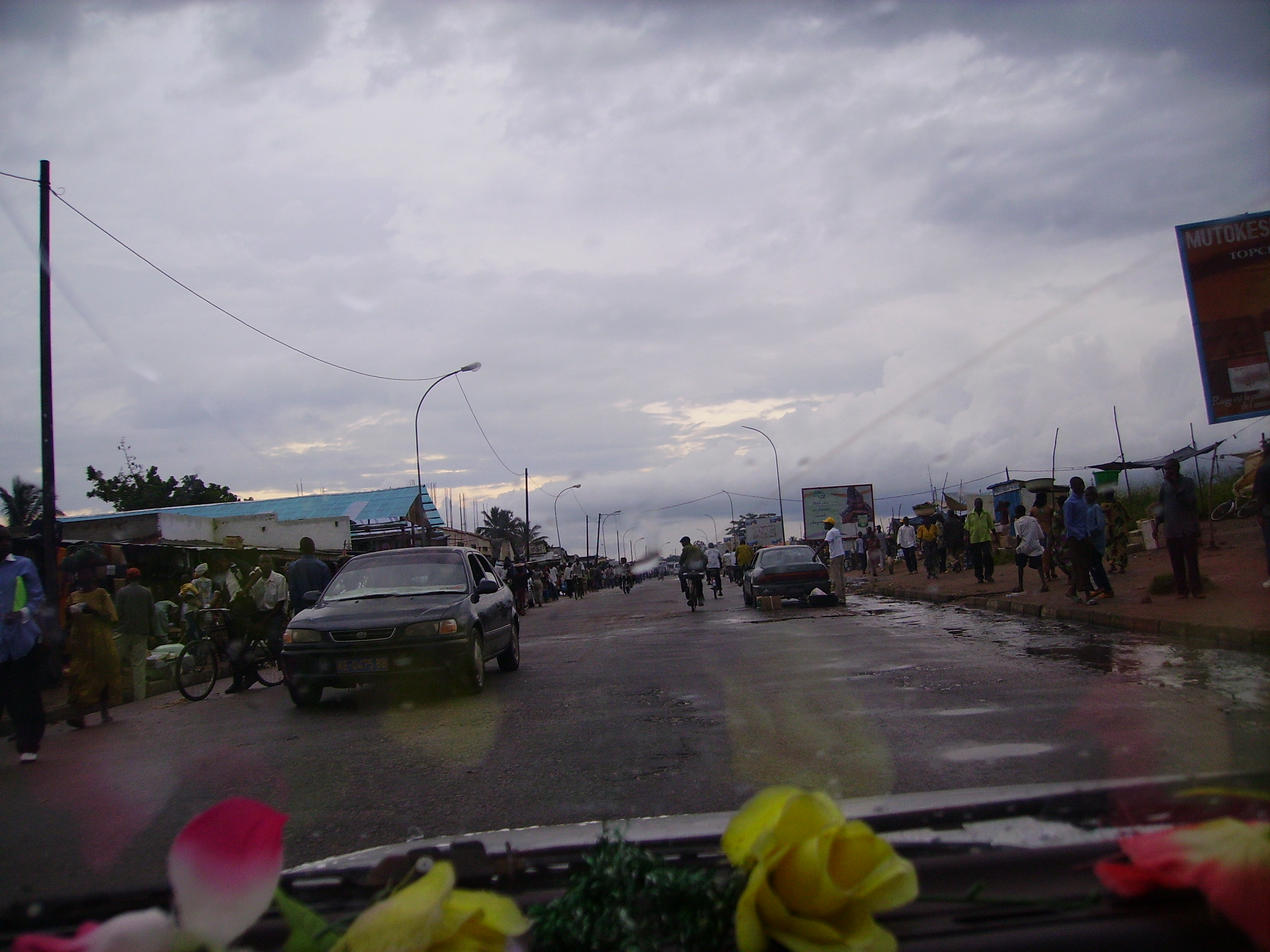
Kananga

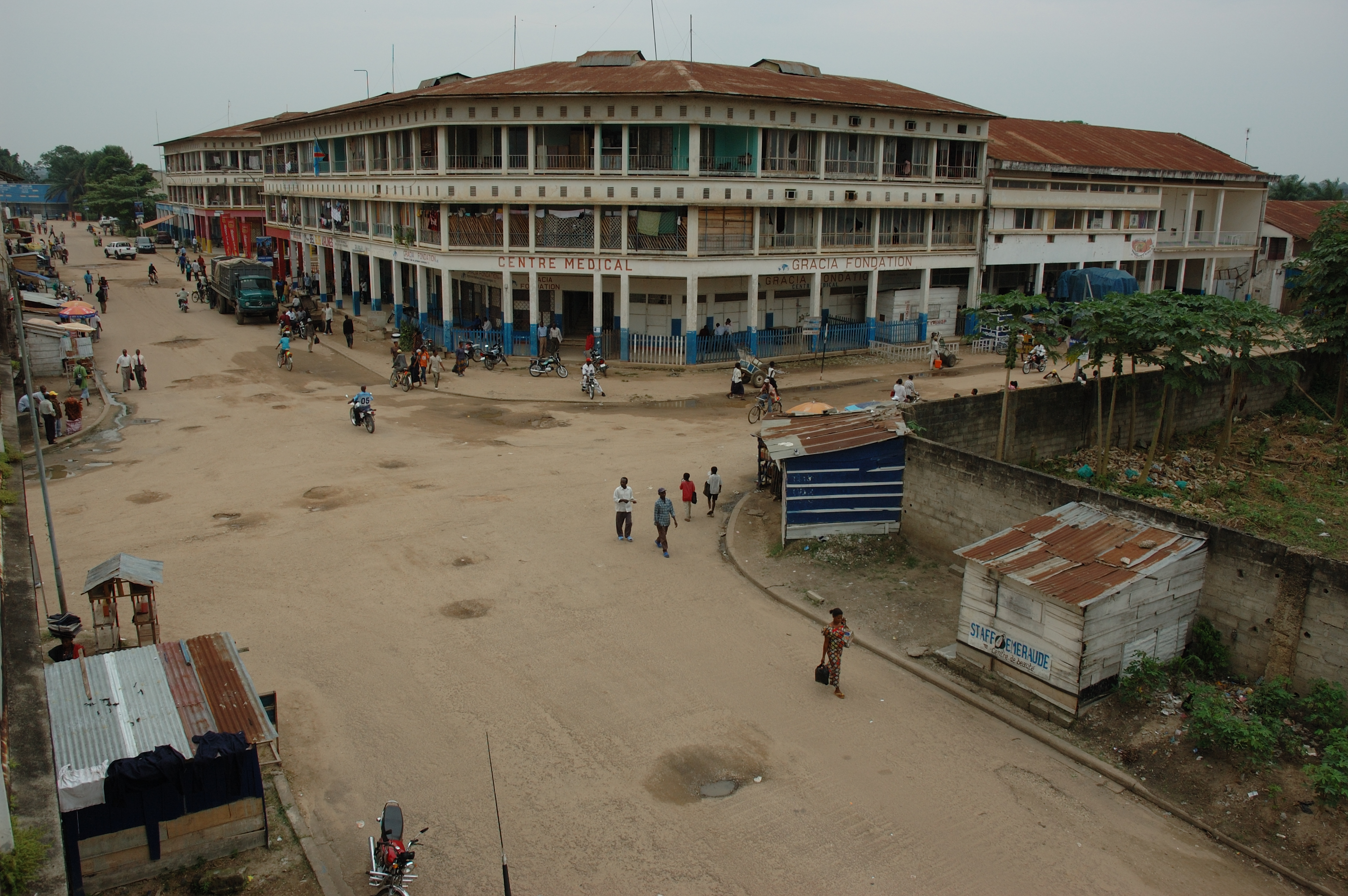
Kisangani

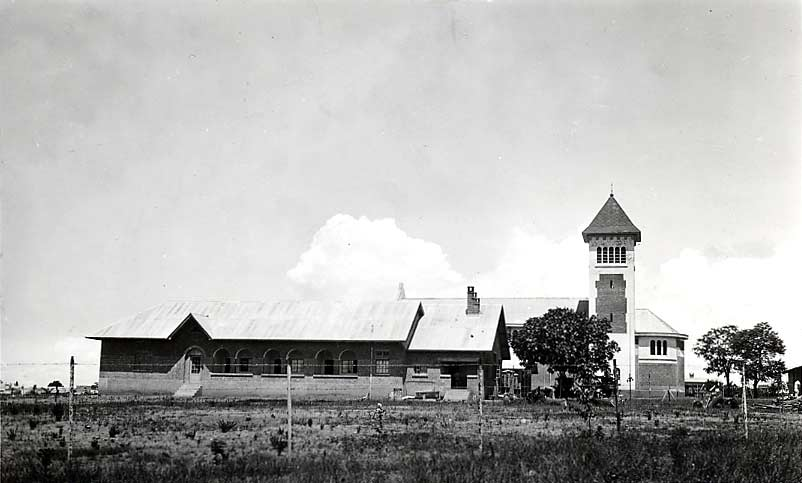
Likasi, 1930s

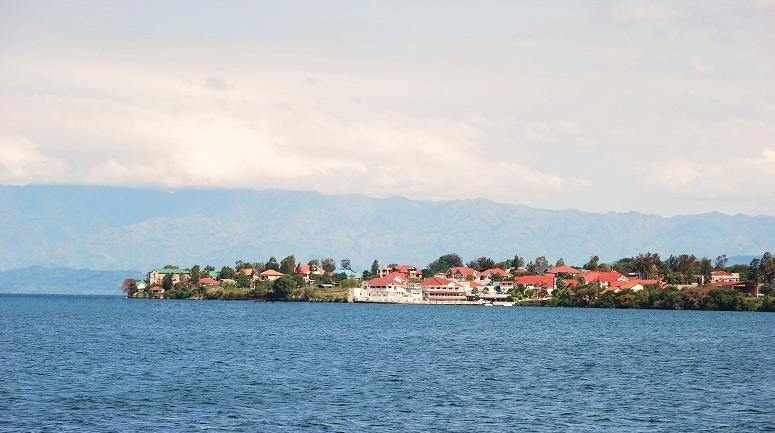
Goma

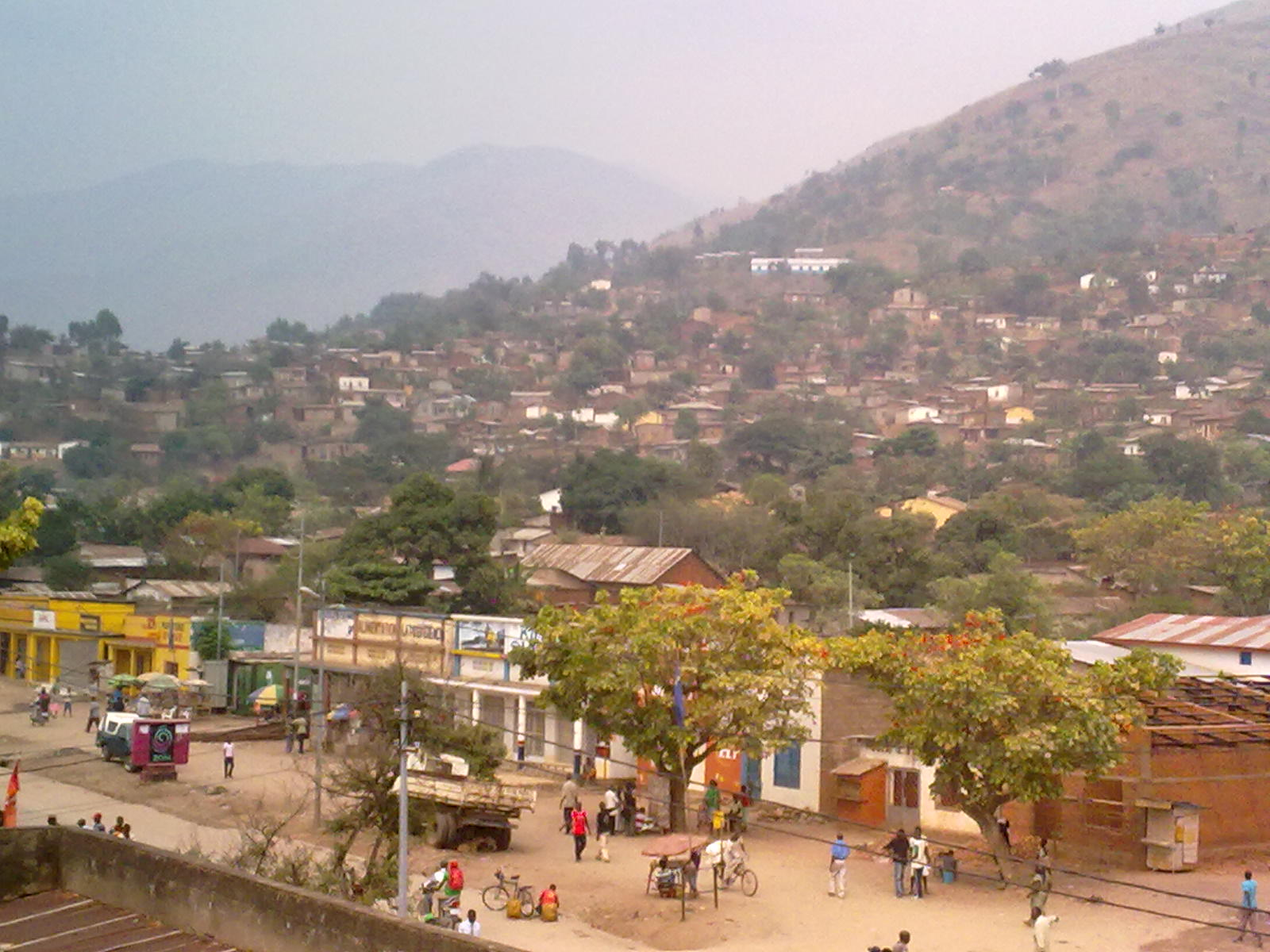
Uvira

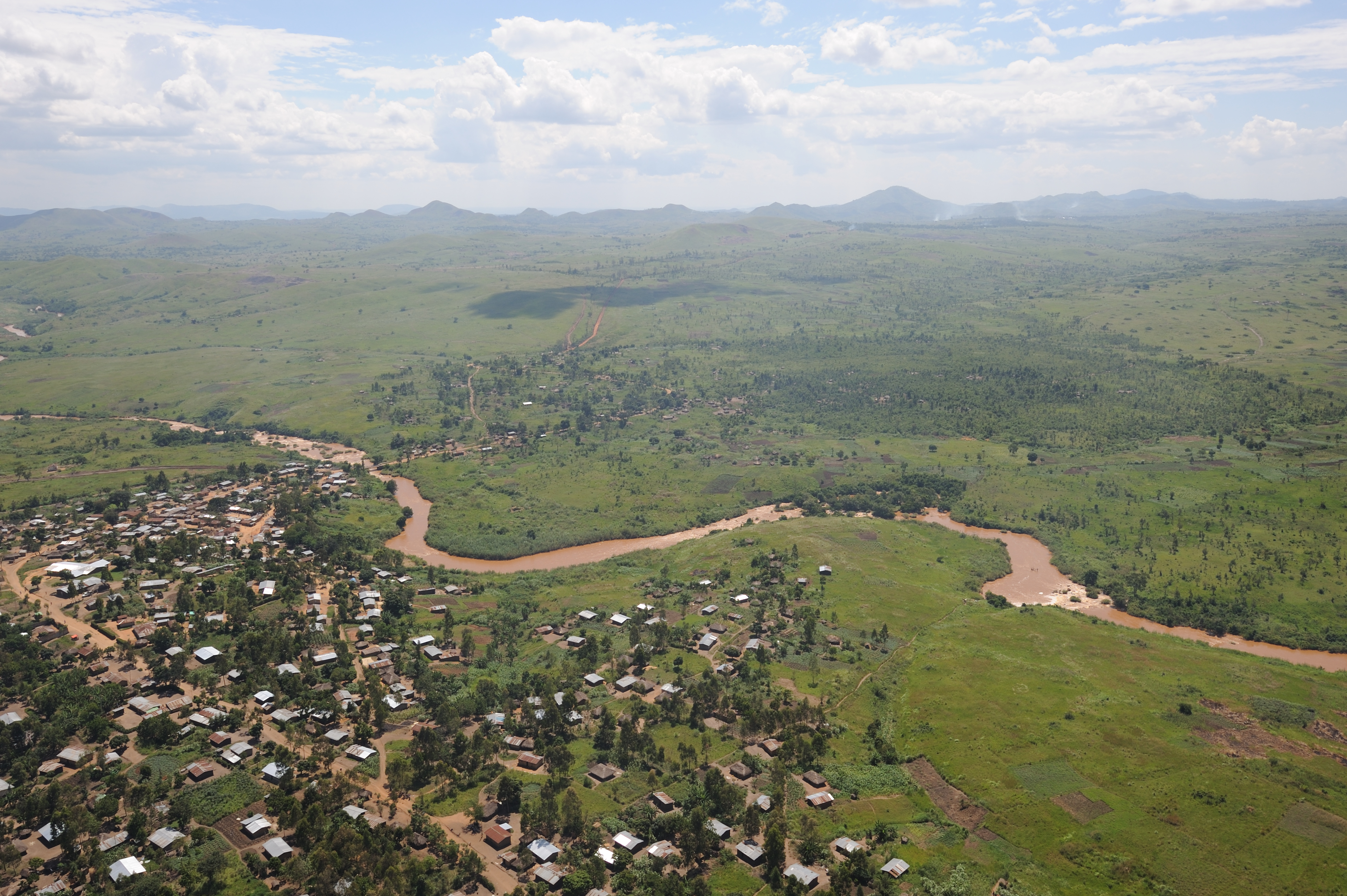
Bunia

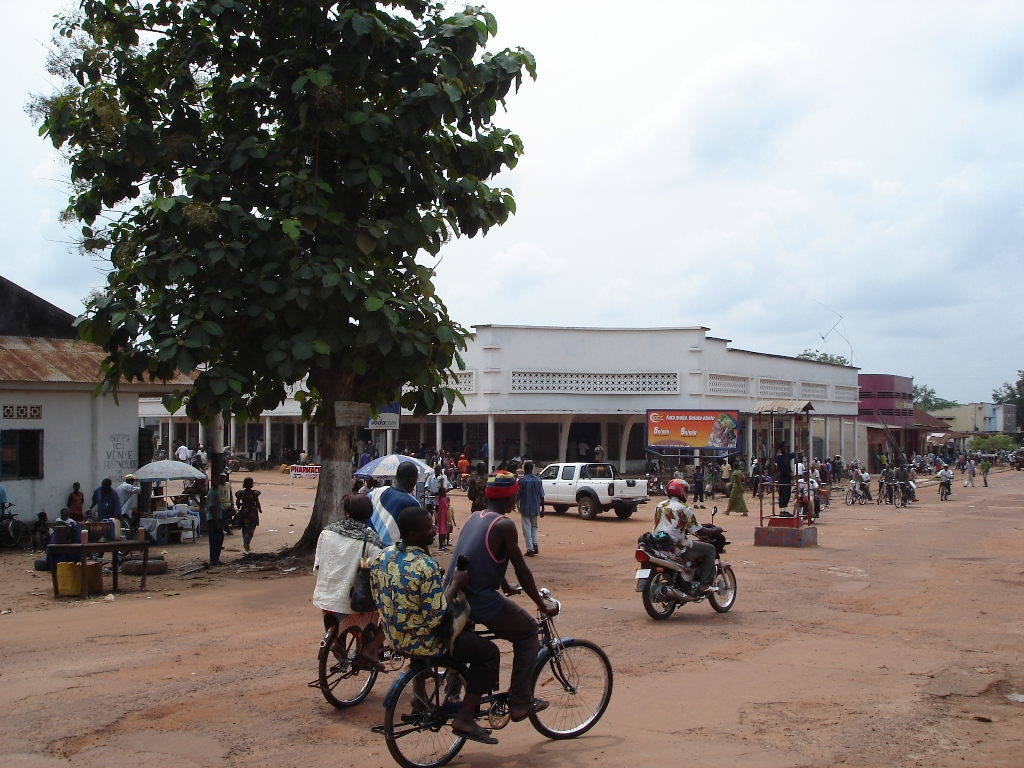
Mbandaka

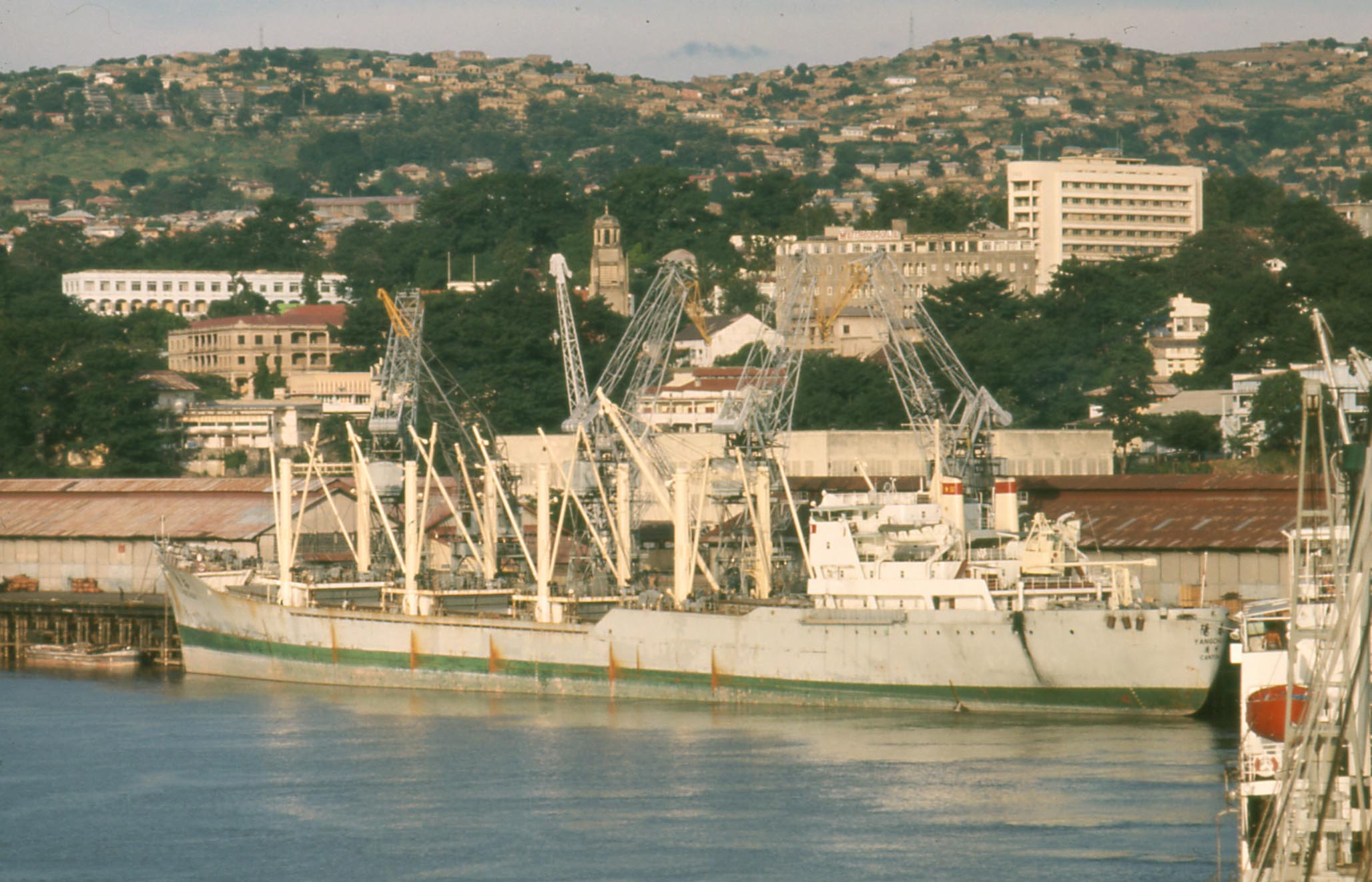
Matadi, 1965

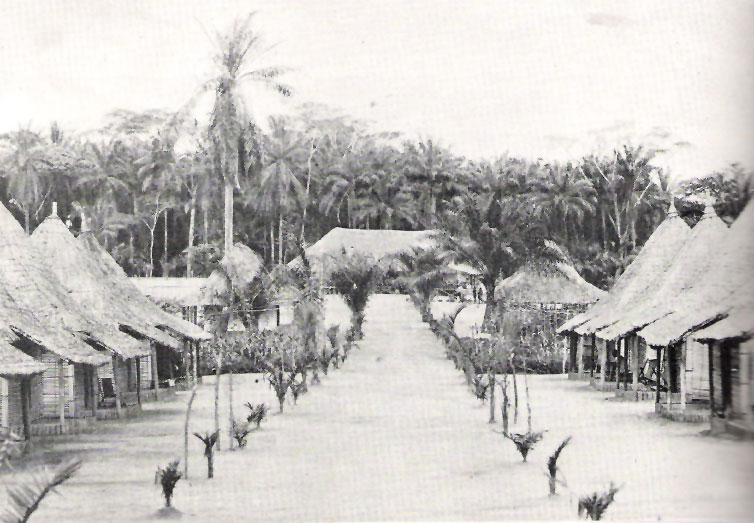
Isiro, 1942

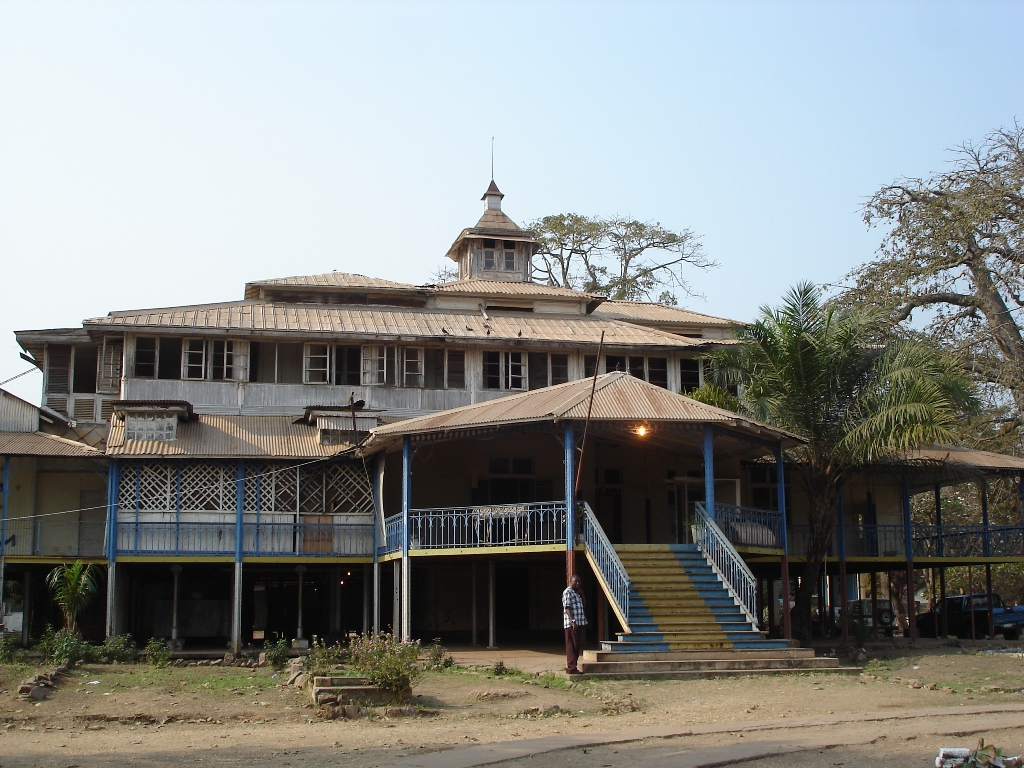
Boma

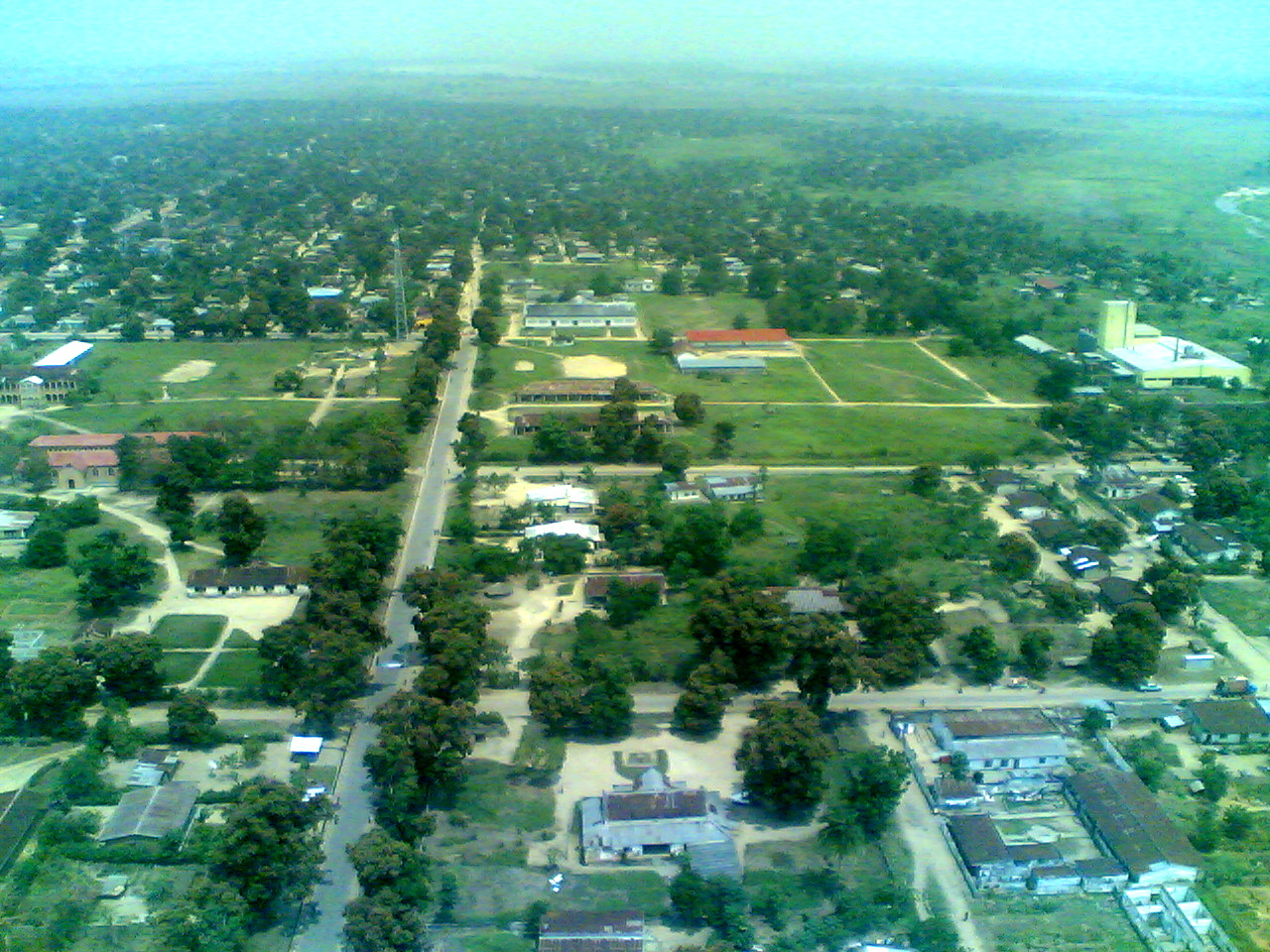
Bandundu

== See also ==
- Former place names in the Democratic Republic of the Congo
