= Districts of the Democratic Republic of the Congo =

Former administrative divisions of the Democratic Republic of the Congo

Before the 2015 repartitioning all but three provinces of the Democratic Republic of the Congo were divided into 26 districts. Those in turn were divided into territories or communes.

== 2008 Districts and territories ==
The provinces of Maniema, Nord-Kivu and Sud-Kivu were not divided into districts. Those three provinces and all other districts were divided into territories. All provinces had one or more cities, which were administratively independent of the districts; in turn those were divided into communes. Except for two, the districts were led by district commissioners.

Districts and cities, other than the capital city of Kinshasa, and their territories or communes consisted of the following before the repartition:

Name	Type	Former Province	Province	Territories and communes
		Maniema	Maniema	Kabambare, Kailo, Kasongo, Kibombo, Lubutu, Pangi, Punia
		North Kivu	North Kivu	Beni, Lubero, Masisi, Nyiragongo, Rutshuru, Walikale
		South Kivu	South Kivu	Fizi, Idjwi, Kabare, Kalehe, Mwenga, Shabunda, Uvira, Walungu
Bandundu	City	Bandundu	Mai-Ndombe	Disasi, Basoko, Mayoyo
Bas-Fleuve District	District	Bas-Congo	Kongo Central	Lukula, Seke-Banza, Tshela
Bas-Uele District	District	Orientale	Bas-Uele	Aketi, Ango, Bambesa, Bondo, Buta, Gwane, Poko
Beni	City	North Kivu	North Kivu	Beni, Bungulu, Ruwenzori, Muhekera
Boma	City/District	Bas-Congo	Kongo Central	Kabondo, Kalamu, Nzadi, Moanda Territory
Bukavu	City	South Kivu	South Kivu	Bagira, Ibanda, Kadutu, Kasha
Butembo	City	North Kivu	North Kivu	Bulengera, Kimemi, Mususa, Vutamba
Cataractes District	District	Bas-Congo	Kongo Central	Luozi, Mbanza-Ngungu, Songololo
Équateur District	District	Équateur	Équateur	Basankusu, Bikoro, Bolomba, Bomongo, Ingende, Lukolela, Makanza
Gbadolite	City	Équateur	Nord-Ubangi	Gbadolite, Molegbe, Nganza
Goma	City	North Kivu	North Kivu	Goma, Karisimbi
Haut-Katanga District	District	Katanga	Haut-Katanga	Kambove, Kasenga, Kipushi, Mitwaba, Pweto, Sakania
Haut-Lomami District	District	Katanga	Haut-Lomami	Bukama, Kabongo, Kamina, Kanyama, Malemba-Nkulu
Haut-Uele District	District	Orientale	Haut-Uele	Dungu, Faradje, Niangara, Rungu, Wamba, Watsa
Ituri District	District	Orientale	Ituri	Aru, Djugu, Irumu, Mahagi, Mambasa
Kabinda District	District	Kasai-Oriental	Lomami	Gandajika, Kabinda, Kamiji, Lubao, Luilu
Kananga	City	Kasai-Occidental	Kasai-Central	Kananga, Katoka, Lukonga, Ndesha, Nganza
Kasaï District	District	Kasai-Occidental	Kasai	Dekese, Ilebo, Kamonia (Tshikapa), Luebo, Mweka
Kikwit	City	Bandundu	Kwilu	Kazamba, Lukemi, Lukolela, Nzida
Kindu	City	Maniema	Maniema	Alungili, Kasuku, Mikelenge
Kisangani	City	Orientale	Tshopo	Kabondo, Kisangani, Lubunga, Makiso, Mangobo, Tshopo
Kolwezi District	City/District	Katanga	Lualaba	Dilala, Manika communes; Lubudi, Mutshatsha territories
Kwango District	District	Bandundu	Kwango	Feshi, Kahemba, Kasongo-Lunda, Kenge, Kisandji, Popokabaka
Kwilu District	District	Bandundu	Kwilu	Bagata, Bulungu, Eolo, Gungu, Idiofa, Kalo, Kikwit, Kilembe, Mangai, Masi-Manimba, Musenge-Munene, Nkara, Sedzo, Zaba
Likasi	City	Katanga	Haut-Katanga	Panda, Kikula, Likasi, Tshituru
Lualaba District	District	Katanga	Lualaba	Dilolo, Kapanga, Sandoa
Lubumbashi	City	Katanga	Haut-Katanga	Annexe, Kamalondo, Kampemba, Katuba, Kenya, Lubumbashi, Rwashi
Lukaya District	District	Bas-Congo	Kongo Central	Kasangulu, Kimvula, Madimba
Lulua District	District	Kasai-Occidental	Kasai-Central	Demba, Dibaya, Dimbelenge, Kazumba, Luiza
Mai-Ndombe District	District	Bandundu	Mai-Ndombe	Bokoro, Inongo, Kiri, Kutu, Nioki, Oshwe
Matadi	City	Bas-Congo	Kongo Central	Matadi, Nzanza, Mvuzi
Mbandaka	City	Équateur	Équateur	Mbandaka, Wangata
Mbuji-Mayi	City	Kasai-Oriental	Kasai-Oriental	Bipemba, Dibindi, Diulu, Kanshi, Muya
Mongala District	District	Équateur	Mongala	Bumba, Bongandanga, Lisala
Mwene-Ditu	City	Kasai-Oriental	Lomami	Bondoyi, Musadi, Mwene-Ditu
Nord-Ubangi District	District	Équateur	Nord-Ubangi	Businga, Bosobolo, Mobayi-Mbongo, Yakoma
Plateaux District	District	Bandundu	Mai-Ndombe	Bolobo, Kwamouth, Mushie, Yumbi
Sankuru District	District	Kasai-Oriental	Sankuru	Katako-Kombe, Kole, Lodja, Lomela, Lubefu, Lusambo
Sud-Ubangi District	District	Équateur	Sud-Ubangi	Budjala, Gemena, Kungu, Libenge
Tanganyika District	District	Katanga	Tanganyika	Kabalo, Kalemie, Kongolo, Manono, Moba, Nyunzu
Tshikapa	City	Kasai-Occidental	Kasai	Dibumba I, Dibumba II, Kanzala, Mabondo, Mbumba
Tshilenge District	District	Kasai-Oriental	Kasai-Oriental	Kabeya-Kamwanga, Katanda, Luhatahata, Miabi, Tshilenge
Tshopo District	District	Orientale	Tshopo	Bafwasende, Banalia, Basoko, Isangi, Opala, Ubundu, Yahuma
Tshuapa District	District	Équateur	Tshuapa	Befale, Boende, Bokungu, Djolu, Ikela, Monkoto
Zongo	City	Équateur	Sud-Ubangi	Nzulu, Wango

Note: Boma and Kolwezi District were a city/district hybrid in the sense that they had both commune and territory divisions and were led by a mayor instead of a district commissioner.

=== Districts of Kinshasa ===
The city of Kinshasa is said to be divided into 4 so-called districts and 24 communes:

District	Communes
Funa District	Bandalungwa, Bumbu, Kalamu, Kasa-Vubu, Makala, Ngiri-Ngiri, Selembao
Lukunga District	Barumbu, Gombe, Kinshasa, Kintambo, Lingwala, Mont Ngafula, Ngaliema
Mont Amba District	Kisenso, Lemba, Limete, Matete, Ngaba
Tshangu District	Kimbanseke, Maluku, Masina, Ndjili, Nsele

These "districts" are not general-government subdivisions under a single administration and a single leader, but are districts used to administer government services such as police, water, schools and so on. They aren't subdivisions of the country. The administrative divisions of Kinshasa are the communes.

== Reorganization ==
The 2006 constitution planned to convert many of the districts into provinces under a decentralization program. However, progress was slow. In October 2007 the Minister for Decentralization, Denis Kalume Numbi, presented a bill for Decentralization in the National Assembly. The subsequent debate turned up a variety of issues that first had to be addressed with changes to related laws. In an October 2010 conclave of the ruling AMP coalition, it was proposed to revise Article 226, which calls for the creation of 26 provinces out of the current 11, in order to allow more time for the transition. In September 2011 the position of "Minister of Decentralization" was abolished. In July 2015 the implementation of the new organization was completed.

== See also ==
- Districts of the Belgian Congo
- Provinces of the Democratic Republic of the Congo
- Territories of the Democratic Republic of the Congo
