= 2026 Kenge Let L-410 crash =

Aviation accident in the Democratic Republic of the Congo

- 9S-GUC, the aircraft involved in the accident, pictured in 2025

Accident
- Date: 25 September 2026
- Summary: Technical problems, under investigation
- Site: Kenge, Kwango Province, Democratic Republic of the Congo

Aircraft
- Aircraft type: Let L-410UVP
- Operator: Tracep Congo Aviation
- Registration: 9S-GUC
- Flight origin: Kikwit, Democratic Republic of the Congo
- Destination: N'Dolo Airport, Kinshasa, Democratic Republic of the Congo
- Occupants: 17
- Passengers: 13
- Crew: 4
- Fatalities: 17
- Survivors: 0

On 25 September 2026, a Let L-410 Turbolet operated by Tracep Congo Aviation had a technical problem during a flight from Kikwit to N'Dolo Airport, Kinshasa. It attempted to land at Kenge in Kwango Province but crashed and caught on fire, killing all 17 occupants.

== Background ==
=== Airline ===
The certificate of Tracep Congo Aviation was suspended on the next day. Like other airlines based in the DRC, it had been banned from flying in the European Union. The crash was the second involving the airline in just over two months, with another L-410 crash near Buluku in July resulting in a fatality.

=== Aircraft ===
The aircraft involved in the accident in May 2021, while still in service with Goma Express

The aircraft involved was registered 9S-GUC, a Let L-410UVP operated by Tracep Congo Aviation. The aircraft was built in 1983 and was a turboprop with two Walter M601 engines. The aircraft sustained damage to the nose gear door in June 2014 after striking a pig on a runway at Shabunda Airport while operating under Goma Express.

=== Passengers and crew ===
The aircraft had four crew members and 13 passengers. The passenger list was a mix of a high-level military justice delegation and a few civilians. Among the military personnel were Lieutenant General Joseph Mutombo Katalayi Tiende, the First President of the High Military Court, and Lieutenant General Lucien-René Likulia Bakumi, the Auditor General of the Armed Forces of the Democratic Republic of the Congo (FARDC).

== Accident ==
The flight was en route from Kikwit to N'Dolo Airport in Kinshasa, carrying a military delegation and civilians. During the flight, the aircraft encountered severe in-flight technical difficulties.

Witnesses on the ground reported seeing the plane circle over Kenge multiple times as the crew desperately looked for a safe place to land. The pilots attempted an emergency landing at the local Kenge aerodrome, but the runway had been decommissioned in 2023 and largely built over with houses and streets due to urban encroachment. At around 2:15 p.m., the aircraft crashed into a residential compound and burst into flames. There were no casualties among the residents on the ground. Every person on the aircraft except the pilot was burnt beyond recognition.

== Aftermath ==
Following the accident the Prime Minister of the Democratic Republic of the Congo and the Minister of National Defense called an emergency meeting of the military command on September 26. Congolese authorities also declared three days of national mourning and stated that an investigation into the accident has been commenced.

Online speculation hypothesised that sabotage could have occurred since the aircraft was carrying high-ranking officials. But, for now, Congolese authorities have dismissed these claims.

== Investigation ==
The aircraft black box was recovered by investigators and brought to Kinshasa where it is being analysed.
