= Gemena Territory =

Gemena
- Territory
- (click for interactive map)
- Coordinates: 2.9559830°N 19.4312781°E
- Country: DR Congo
- Province: Sud-Ubangi
- HQ: Bobito

Government
  - Type: Assigned administration
  - Administrator: Alexis Alenge
- Time zone: UTC+1 (West Africa Time)

Gemena is a territory of Sud-Ubangi province in the Democratic Republic of the Congo. After the town of Gemena became a separately administered city, it was decided to move the territory's administrative center from there to the smaller town of Bobito.
