= Tshilenge District =

Coordinates: 06°09′S 023°36′E

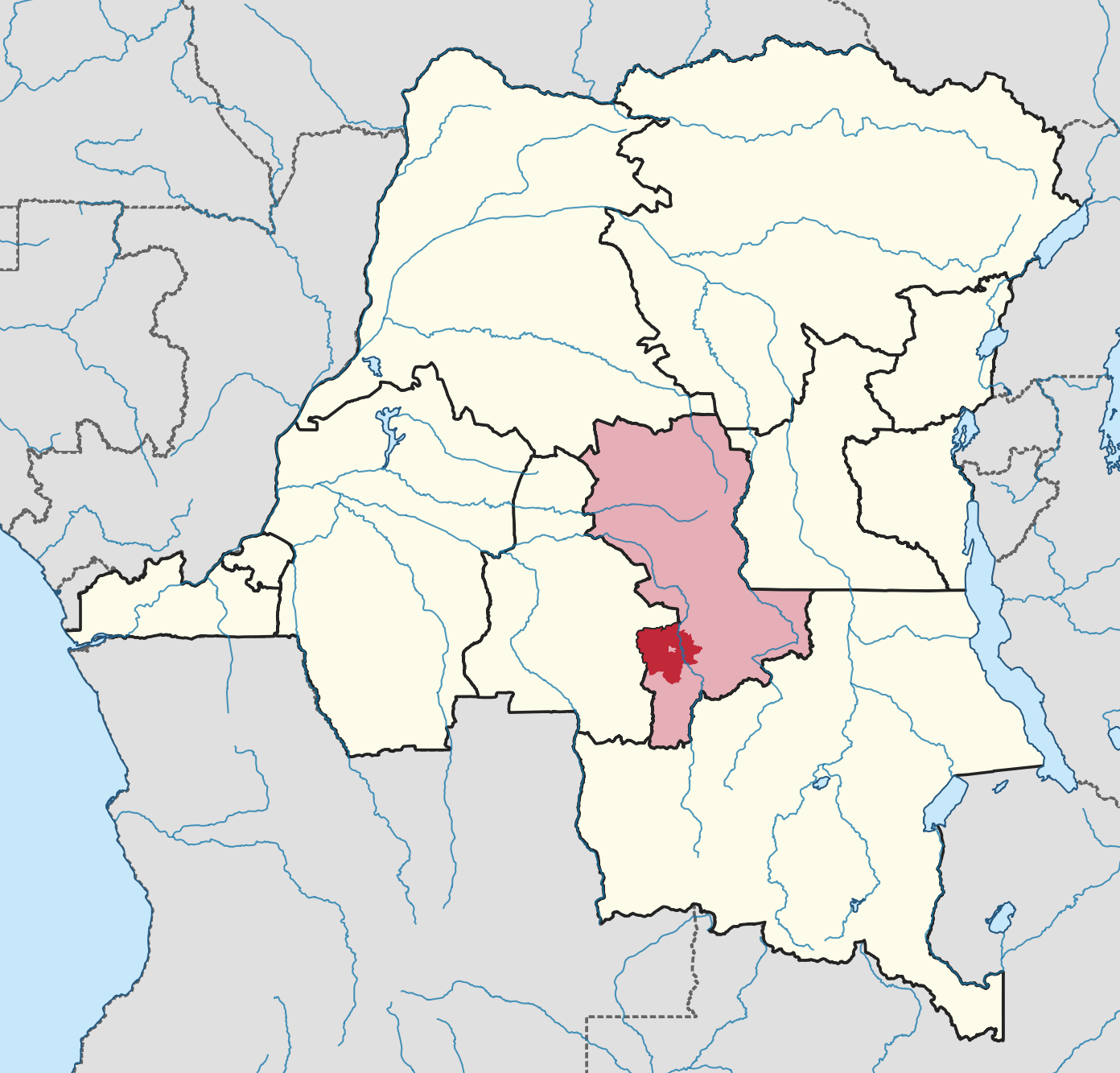
Tshilenge district within Kasai-Oriental province (2014)

Tshilenge District was one of the districts of former Kasai-Oriental province (1966–2015) in the Democratic Republic of the Congo. While it enclosed the city of Mbuji-Mayi, the city was administered independently. As specified under Article 2 of the country's 2006 Constitution, in 2015 the district was merged with the city of Mbuji-Mayi to form the new province Kasai Oriental. The capital of the province is Mbuji-Mayi.

== People ==
Kasai-Oriental is inhabited by members of the Luba people. French is the official language. Tshiluba is one of the four national languages of the Democratic Republic of the Congo. Tshiluba is spoken by about 6.3 million people in the Kasai-Oriental and Kasai-Occidental provinces and the Lulua District.

== History ==
Congo obtained independence from Belgium in 1960. Friction with Congo's other ethnic groups and encouragement by Belgian corporations hoping to keep their mining concessions led to the secession of the province of South Kasai as a separate state headed by Albert Kalonji. After being repulsed, the Congo occupied the province in September 1961. Several thousand people were killed during the "pacification" of South Kasai, which lasted through the spring of 1962.

The population of Mbuji-Mayi grew rapidly with the immigration of Luba people from other parts of the country.

== Diamond mining ==
The region in which Mbuji-Mayi is situated annually produces one-tenth in weight of the world's industrial diamonds, with mining managed by the Société Minière de Bakwanga. This is the largest accumulation of diamonds in the world, more concentrated than those at Kimberley, South Africa. Mbuji-Mayi handles most of the industrial diamonds produced in the Congo.

== Political divisions ==
The province consists of the following five territories:

- Kabeya-Kamwanga
- Katanda
- Lupatapata
- Miabi
- Tshilenge
