= André-Philippe Futa =

Democratic Republic of the Congo politician (1946–2009)

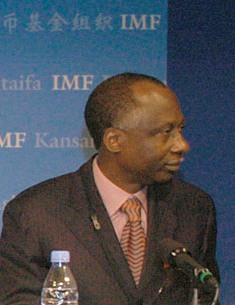
- André-Philippe Futa in 2004
- Born: August 26, 1943; Miabi, Tshilenge District
- Died: October 1, 2009 (aged 66); Paris, France
- Education: University of Florida; Official University of Congo
- Known for: Being the President of National Alliance Party for Unity (PANU)

André-Philippe Futa (August 26, 1943 – October 1, 2009) was a politician in the Democratic Republic of the Congo. He was originally from Miabi in Tshilenge District.

== Biography ==
André-Philippe Futa Mudiumbula Tshitumbu Tshipadi was born in Miabi, Tshilenge District, Democratic Republic of Congo as the only son of Kabongo wa Mfuta wa Kalubi and Tshiambuaya Marie-Madeleine. He was a member of the royal family of Bena Mbayi and Bakwa Dishi.

Futa was admitted to the Official University of Congo (UOC), where he studied agronomic sciences and graduated with distinctive honors as an agricultural engineer. He then moved to Kamina, where he became the head of the regional Companie des Grands Elevages de Katongola. In 1972, he became assistant professor at Université National du Zaïre.

He then attended the University of Florida, earning a master's degree in Food and Resources Economy in 1976. In 1979, he obtained his Ph.D. from Oklahoma State University.

In 1980, he was employed by the African Development Bank (ADB) in Abidjan, Côte d'Ivoire, where he spent most of his career. In 1997, he was dispatched to the International Centre of Insect Physiology and Ecology (ICIPE) as Director. Two years later, he returned to the ADB as the East Africa Representative Director in the regional office of Addis Abeba, Ethiopia.

In April 2001, Futa returned to Kinshasa when he was called by the President of the Democratic Republic of Congo to join his government as Minister of Agriculture, Fisheries and Livestock. President Joseph Kabila again showed his trust in Futa by appointing him to the Ministry of Economy in November 2002. At the conclusion of the peace negotiations, a Government of National Unity was put in place in June 2003, in which Futa was successively named Minister of Industry and then Minister of Finance. He occupied the latter post until November 2005. During his term as Minister of Finance, Futa was elected chairman of the Board of Governors of the World Bank and International Monetary Fund.

During the National Convention of the National Alliance Party for Unity (PANU) in March 2006, he was elected President of the Party.

Dr. Futa was a member of several professional organizations, including Omicron Delta Epsilon and the International Association of Agricultural Economists. He has published works on economic development.

He died on October 1, 2009, in Paris.
