= Kenge Territory =

Coordinates: 4°52′0″S 16°59′0″E

Kenge
- Territory
- Interactive map of Kenge
- Country: DR Congo
- Province: Kwango
- HQ: Kenge II

Area
  - Total: 18,126 km^{2} (6,998 sq mi)

Population
  - Total: 1,857,812
  - Density: 102.49/km^{2} (265.46/sq mi)
- Time zone: UTC+1 (West Africa Time)

Kenge is a territory of Kwango province in the Democratic Republic of the Congo. After the town of Kenge became a separately administered city, it was decided to move the territory's administrative center from there to the smaller town of Kenge II located nearby on the other side of the Wamba River.
