= Kenge =

Kenge may refer to:

- Kenge, Kwango, the capital of Kwango province in the Democratic Republic of the Congo
- Kenge Territory, an administrative division of Kwango province in the Democratic Republic of the Congo
  - Kenge II the administrative center of the territory
- Kenge, Kongo Central, a town in the Kongo Central province of the Democratic Republic of the Congo
