= Lusanga =

Lusanga may refer to:

- Lusanga, Kwilu, a town in Kwilu District of Bandundu Province of the Democratic Republic of the Congo
- Lusanga, Kwango, a town in Kwango District, Bandundu Province, Democratic Republic of the Congo
