= Budjala =

- Commune
- Location in Democratic Republic of the Congo
- Coordinates: 2°38′52″N 19°42′23″E
- Country: DR Congo
- Province: Sud-Ubangi
- Territory: Budjala

Budjala is a rural locality in the Province of Sud-Ubangi in the Democratic Republic of the Congo. It is the seat of Budjala Territory.

== See also ==
- List of cities in the Democratic Republic of the Congo
