= Popokabaka Airport =

- IATA: none; ICAO: FZCP

Summary
- Airport type: Public
- Serves: Popokabaka
- Elevation AMSL: 1,575 ft / 480 m
- Coordinates: 5°44′20″S 16°35′10″E

Map
- Location of the airport in Democratic Republic of the Congo

Runways
Direction	Length		Surface
Direction	m	ft	Surface
12/30	1,140	3,740	Grass
- Sources: GCM Google Maps

Popokabaka Airport (ICAO: FZCP) is an airstrip serving the city of Popokabaka in Kwango Province, Democratic Republic of the Congo. The runway parallels road R228 approximately 5 kilometres (3.1 mi) south of the city.

== See also ==
- Transport in the Democratic Republic of the Congo
- List of airports in the Democratic Republic of the Congo
