= Mangina =

Mangina may refer to:

- Mangina, Democratic Republic of the Congo, a city
- Mangina (moth), a genus of moth
- Phyllis Mangina, American basketball coach
- Mangina (term), a slang term for the vagina of a transgender man
