= Kapanga Airport =

- IATA: KAP; ICAO: FZSK

Summary
- Airport type: Public
- Serves: Kapanga
- Elevation AMSL: 3,025 ft / 922 m
- Coordinates: 8°22′20″S 22°38′50″E

Map
- Location of the airport in Democratic Republic of the Congo

Runways
Direction	Length		Surface
Direction	m	ft	Surface
02/20	1,230	4,035	Grass
- Sources: Google Maps GCM

Kapanga Airport (IATA: KAP, ICAO: FZSK) is an airport serving the town of Kapanga in Lualaba Province, Democratic Republic of the Congo.

== See also ==
- Transport in the Democratic Republic of the Congo
- List of airports in the Democratic Republic of the Congo
