= Kapanga (town) =

Town in the Democratic Republic of Congo

- Interactive map of Kapanga
- Coordinates: 8.389°S 22.56408°E
- Elevation: 868 m (2,848 ft)

Population (2012)
  - Total: 2,287

Kapanga is a town located in the Kapanga Territory of the Lualaba Province in the Democratic Republic of the Congo. It is served by the Kapanga Airport.

== Geography ==
The town is situated near the banks of the Lulua River to the west. The N39 highway runs through the town's center.

== Notable Events ==
During the Shaba I conflict in the Democratic Republic of the Congo, then called Zaire, the Congolese National Liberation Front invaded Kapanga as part of a three-pronged attack on March 8, 1977.

On September 19, 2015, the Electricity for Kapanga (ELKAP) project brought major improvements to the electrical grid of the Kapanga territory. 45,000 people in several towns, including the towns of Kapanga and Musumba, were connected together with a green energy grid powered by a dam and a hydroelectric power plant.

== See also ==
- List of cities and towns in the Democratic Republic of the Congo
