= Dimbelenge =

City of the Democratic Republic of the Congo

Coordinates: 5°33′28″S 23°06′52″E

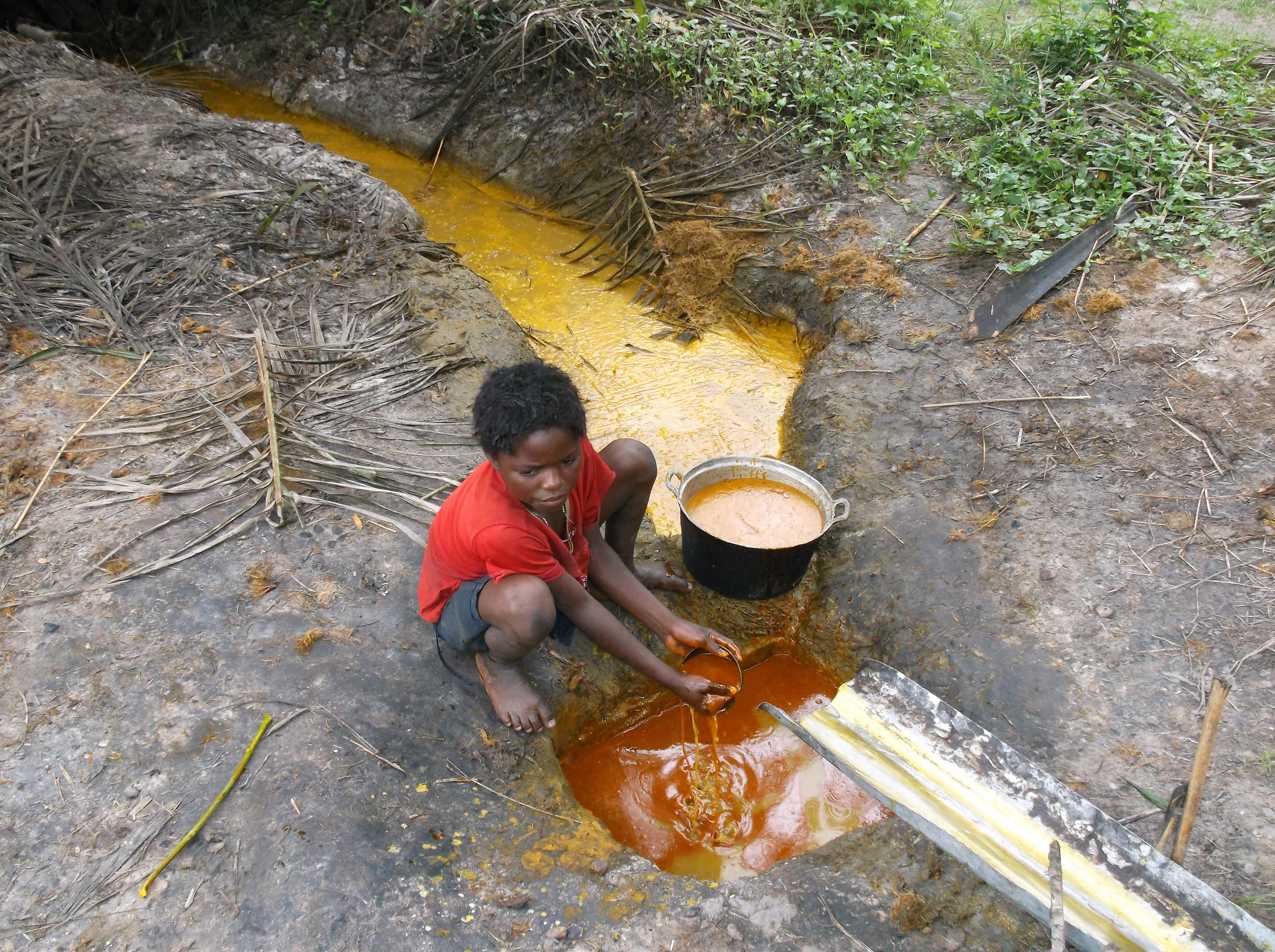
Child refining palm oil in Dimbelenge

Dimbelenge is a city of the Democratic Republic of the Congo. It is located in Kasaï-Central. As of 2012, it had an estimated population of 3,990.
