= Dilunga =

City of the Democratic Republic of the Congo

Dilunga is a city of the Democratic Republic of the Congo. It is located in Kasai-Oriental Province. As of 2012, it had an estimated population of 25,079.
