= Popokabaka Territory =

Popokabaka
- Territory
- Interactive map of Popokabaka
- Coordinates: 5.692281°S 16.586051°E
- Country: DR Congo
- Province: Kwango
- Seat: Popokabaka
- Time zone: UTC+1 (West Africa Time)

Popokabaka Territory is a territory of the Democratic Republic of the Congo. It is located in the Kwango province. The territory is divided into three sectors: Yonso, Popokabaka and Lufuna. The Kwango River runs through the territory. The administrative center is the city of Popokabaka.
