= Kenge Airport =

- IATA: none; ICAO: FZCS

Summary
- Airport type: Public
- Serves: Kenge
- Elevation AMSL: 1,808 ft / 551 m
- Coordinates: 4°50′15″S 17°1′45″E

Map
- Location of the airport in Democratic Republic of the Congo

Runways
Direction	Length		Surface
Direction	ft	m	Surface
01/19	3,050	930	Gravel
- Sources: Google Maps GCM

Kenge Airport (ICAO: FZCS) was an airport serving the town of Kenge in Democratic Republic of the Congo. 2023 satellite imagery shows the runway in the process of being overbuilt with new streets and houses.

== See also ==
- Transport in the Democratic Republic of the Congo
- List of airports in the Democratic Republic of the Congo
