= Lusanga, Kwango =

Coordinates: 5.580814°S 16.514297°E

Lusanga is a town in the Kwango Province of the Democratic Republic of the Congo. The town is situated approximately 20 miles north of the Angolan border, and the same distance west of the Kwango River. It lies northeast of the town of Popokabaka. There is also another town called Lusanga in Kwilu District of Bandundu province, to the north of Kikwit.
