= Balamba, Democratic Republic of the Congo =

- Interactive map of Balamba, Democratic Republic of the Congo
- Coordinates: 12°47′S 28°39′E
- Country: Democratic Republic of the Congo

Balamba is a town in Haut-Katanga Province in the Democratic Republic of the Congo.

== Demographics ==
In 2012 it had a population of 55,641 inhabitants, and in 2004 it had 47,213.

== See also ==
- List of cities in the Democratic Republic of the Congo
