= Dichomeris loxonoma =

Scientific classification
- Kingdom: Animalia
- Phylum: Arthropoda
- Class: Insecta
- Order: Lepidoptera
- Family: Gelechiidae
- Genus: Dichomeris
- Species: D. loxonoma

Binomial name
- Dichomeris loxonoma Meyrick, 1937

Species of moth

Dichomeris loxonoma is a moth in the family Gelechiidae. It was described by Edward Meyrick in 1937. It is found in the former Équateur province in the Democratic Republic of the Congo.

The larvae feed on Millettia versicolor.
