= Kipamba =

City of the Democratic Republic of the Congo

- Location within Democratic Republic of the Congo
- Coordinates: 8.2°S 26.42°E

Population (2012)
  - Total: 31,605

Kipamba is a city of the Democratic Republic of the Congo. As of 2012, it had an estimated population of 31,605.
