= Lwambo =

City of the Democratic Republic of the Congo

- Location within Democratic Republic of the Congo
- Coordinates: 10.82°S 26.78°E

Population (2012)
  - Total: 13,317

Lwambo is a city of Haut-Katanga Province in the Democratic Republic of the Congo. As of 2012, it had an estimated population of 13,317.
