= Budjala Territory =

Budjala
- Territory
- Interactive map of Budjala
- Coordinates: 2°39′N 19°42′E
- Country: DR Congo
- Province: Sud-Ubangi
- Seat: Budjala
- Time zone: UTC+1 (West Africa Time)

Budjala is a territory and a locality of Sud-Ubangi province in the Democratic Republic of the Congo, located in the northwestern part of the country, 900 km northeast of the capital Kinshasa.

In the surroundings around Budjala, mainly green-green deciduous forest grows. Around Budjala, it is quite sparsely populated, with 32 per square kilometre (83/sq mi). The region has a savanna climate. Annual average temperature in the funnel is 22 °C (72 °F). The warmest month is March, when the average temperature is 23 °C, and the coldest is October, with 22 °C. Average annual rainfall is 1,920 millimetres (76 in). The rainy month is August, with an average of 268 mm (10.6 in) rainfall, and the driest is January, with 22 mm (0.87 in) rainfall.

== Sectors ==
The territory of Budjala is divided into five sectors, in addition to the town of Budjala:

- Banza (capital Bango-Nzembe): 14 groupings of 92 villages
- Bolingo (capital Balaw): 19 groupings of 121 villages
- Ngombe Doko De Likimi (capital Likimi): 7 groupings of 76 villages
- Mongala-Kuma (capital Dongo): 12 groupings of 98 villages
- Ndolo Liboko (capital Likaw): 18 groupings of 88 villages
