= Malemba-Nkulu =

City of the Democratic Republic of the Congo

- Location within Democratic Republic of the Congo
- Coordinates: 8.03°S 26.08°E

Population (2012)
  - Total: 29,970

Malemba-Nkulu is a city of the Democratic Republic of the Congo. As of 2012, it had an estimated population of 29,970.
