= Kayna, Democratic Republic of the Congo =

City of the Democratic Republic of the Congo

Kayna
- Location within Democratic Republic of the Congo
- Coordinates: 0.62°S 29.17°E

Population (2012)
  - Total: 36,273

Kayna is a city of the Democratic Republic of the Congo. As of 2012, it had an estimated population of 36,273.
