= Kabambare =

City of the Democratic Republic of the Congo

- Location within Democratic Republic of the Congo
- Coordinates: 4.7°S 27.72°E

Population (2012)
  - Total: 10,883

Kabambare is a city in Maniema Province of the Democratic Republic of the Congo. As of 2012, it had an estimated population of 10,883.
