= Dichomeris craspedotis =

Scientific classification
- Kingdom: Animalia
- Phylum: Arthropoda
- Class: Insecta
- Order: Lepidoptera
- Family: Gelechiidae
- Genus: Dichomeris
- Species: D. craspedotis

Binomial name
- Dichomeris craspedotis (Meyrick, 1937)

Synonyms
- Trichotaphe craspedotis Meyrick, 1937

Species of moth

Dichomeris craspedotis is a moth in the family Gelechiidae. It was described by Edward Meyrick in 1937. It is found in the former Équateur province of the Democratic Republic of the Congo.
