= Mangina, Democratic Republic of the Congo =

City of the Democratic Republic of the Congo

Mangina
- Location within Democratic Republic of the Congo
- Coordinates: 0.605°N 29.309°E

Population (2012)
  - Total: 39,351
- Time zone: UTC+2 (CAT)

Mangina is a city in Beni Territory in the North Kivu province of the Democratic Republic of the Congo. As of 2012, it had an estimated population of 39,351.
