= Mulongo =

- Location in DRC
- Coordinates: 7°50′S 27°00′E
- Country: DR Congo
- Province: Haut-Lomami

Population (2012)
  - Total: 60,815
- Time zone: UTC+2 (Central Africa Time)

Mulongo is a town in Haut-Lomami, in southern Democratic Republic of the Congo. As of 2012, it has a population of 60,815.
