= Kanteba =

City of the Democratic Republic of the Congo

- Location within Democratic Republic of the Congo
- Coordinates: 7.30°S 27.46°E

Population (2012)
  - Total: 18,225

Kanteba is a site in Manono Territory in Tanganyika Province of the Democratic Republic of the Congo. As of 2012, it had an estimated population of 18,225.
