= Katwa (commune) =

Commune of the Democratic Republic of the Congo

- Location within Democratic Republic of the Congo
- Coordinates: 0.10°N 29.32°E

Population (2012)
  - Total: 63,422

Katwa is a commune of Butembo in North Kivu province, Democratic Republic of Congo, north of Lake Edward and close to the border with Uganda. As of 2012, it had an estimated population of 63,422

The town was seriously affected by the 2018–20 Kivu Ebola epidemic but a treatment centre set up by Médecins Sans Frontières was closed down in February 2019 after being attacked and partially burned, with one death. In June 2019 the WHO Director-General Tedros Adhanom visited Katwa where he launched a new vaccination protocol.
