= Musenge-Munene =

- Location in Democratic Republic of the Congo
- Coordinates: 4°45′36″S 19°24′36″E
- Country: Democratic Republic of the Congo
- Province: Kwilu

Musenge-Munene is a community in Kwilu province, Democratic Republic of the Congo (DRC).
