= Nkara =

- Location in Democratic Republic of the Congo
- Coordinates: 4°31′48″S 18°54′0″E
- Country: Democratic Republic of the Congo
- Province: Kwilu

Nkara is a community in Kwilu province, Democratic Republic of the Congo (DRC).
