= Lupatapata =

City of the Democratic Republic of the Congo

- Location within Democratic Republic of the Congo
- Coordinates: 4.67°S 24.28°E

Population (2012)
  - Total: 19,432

Lupatapata is a city in Kasaï-Oriental province of the Democratic Republic of the Congo. As of 2012, it had an estimated population of 19,432.
