= Gwane =

Town in Bas-Uele Province, Democratic Republic of the Congo

- Town
- Location in the Democratic Republic of the Congo
- Coordinates: 4°42′55″N 25°50′40″E
- Country: Democratic Republic of the Congo
- Province: Bas-Uele
- Territory: Ango

Gwane is a town in Bas-Uele Province in the Democratic Republic of the Congo (DRC).

== History ==
Gwane is mentioned in administrative history sources about the territory of Ango: the territorial headquarters (chef-lieu) was first located at Gwane in 1925 before being moved to Dakwa in 1927 and later to Ango in 1930. An archival record from the Royal Museum for Central Africa (AfricaMuseum) also refers to a “poste de Gwane” in 1914 (letters received from the post).

== See also ==
- Ango Territory
- Bas-Uele
