= Gemena =

- Provincial capital and city
- Ville de Gemena
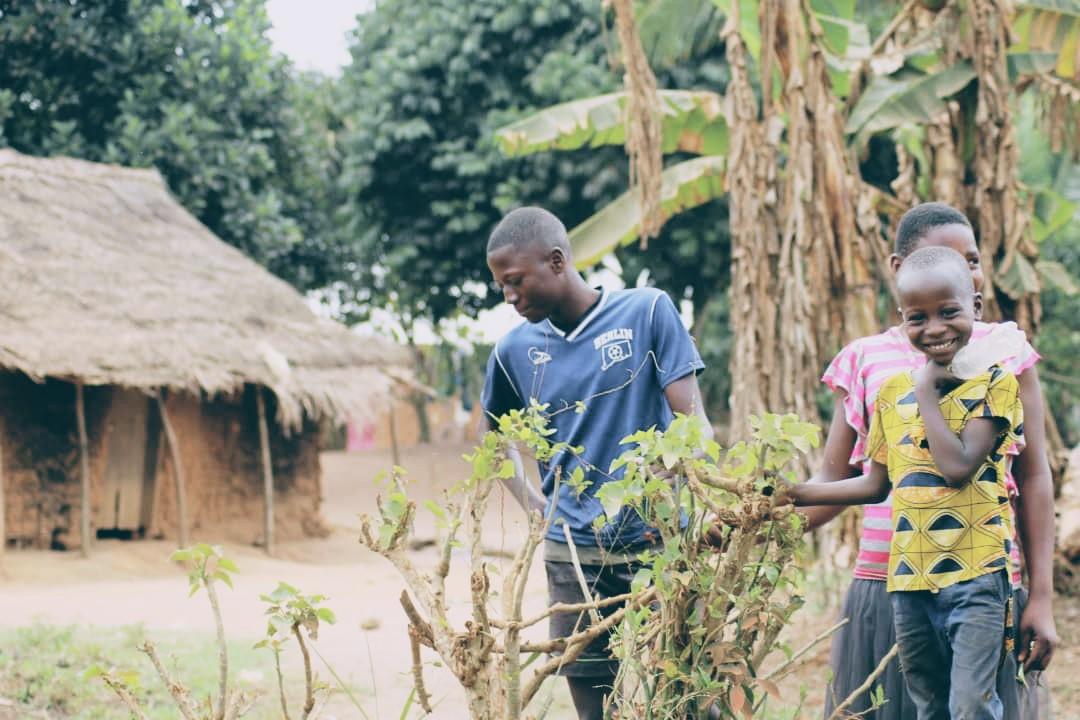
- Famille à Gemena

- Location in Democratic Republic of the Congo
- Coordinates: 3°15′N 19°46′E
- Country: DR Congo
- Province: Sud-Ubangi
- Communes: Gbazubu, Labo, Lac-Ntumba, Mont Gila

Government
  - Mayor: Jacob Luba
- Elevation: 555 m (1,821 ft)

Population (2012)
  - Total: 138,527
- Time zone: UTC+1 (West Africa Time)
- Climate: Am

Gemena is the capital city of Sud-Ubangi Province in the Democratic Republic of the Congo. It has a population of 350,511 (2017). The city has a large airport and hosts the 10th integrated Brigade of the new FARDC since 2007.

Mobutu Sese Seko's mother, Mama Yemo, died in Gemena in 1971; a vast mausoleum was built in her memory.

== Climate ==
Climate data for Gemena, elevation 446 m (1,463 ft), (1971–2000)
Month	Jan	Feb	Mar	Apr	May	Jun	Jul	Aug	Sep	Oct	Nov	Dec	Year
Mean daily maximum °C (°F)	30.8 (87.4)	32.2 (90.0)	31.5 (88.7)	30.9 (87.6)	30.8 (87.4)	29.5 (85.1)	28.6 (83.5)	29.0 (84.2)	29.8 (85.6)	29.8 (85.6)	30.0 (86.0)	30.3 (86.5)	30.3 (86.5)
Mean daily minimum °C (°F)	19.6 (67.3)	20.0 (68.0)	20.5 (68.9)	20.4 (68.7)	20.7 (69.3)	20.4 (68.7)	20.0 (68.0)	20.0 (68.0)	19.8 (67.6)	20.0 (68.0)	20.0 (68.0)	19.8 (67.6)	20.1 (68.2)
Average precipitation mm (inches)	45.0 (1.77)	57.0 (2.24)	132.0 (5.20)	160.0 (6.30)	189.0 (7.44)	159.0 (6.26)	162.0 (6.38)	160.0 (6.30)	233.0 (9.17)	238.0 (9.37)	141.0 (5.55)	63.0 (2.48)	1,739 (68.46)
Average relative humidity (%)	79	77	80	83	83	85	87	86	84	84	85	82	83
Source: FAO
