= Sedzo =

- Location in Democratic Republic of the Congo
- Coordinates: 4°2′36″S 19°10′59″E
- Country: Democratic Republic of the Congo
- Province: Kwilu

Sedzo is a community in Kwilu province, Democratic Republic of the Congo (DRC).
