= Miabi =

Coordinates: 06°12′S 23°23′E

Miabi is a territory of the Kasai-Oriental province of the Democratic Republic of the Congo. It is inhabited by the Bakwa Dishi and the land, which covers an area of approximately 1,900 square miles (4,900 km^{2}), is owned by its royal family.

Miabi is also the name of a town within the territory. Kazadi Diofua, who had been imprisoned for 10 years by the local colonial power for rebelling and demanding the autonomy of his people, founded the town in 1933 after his release from prison. Diofua was the last King of the Bakwa Dishi and uncle of the present heir to the throne André-Philippe Futa. Miabi, considered the capital of the land of the Bakwa Dishi, is Futa's place of birth.

== Other significance ==
Miabi is a word in Tshiluba which is the plural form of muabi, a tree of light greyish leaves with a white trunk and branches which is typically found in the current territory of Miabi.

In the tradition of the Bakwa Dishi, the muabi tree is planted, accompanied by ceremonies of blessings, in order to bless a man or a woman.
