= Popokabaka =

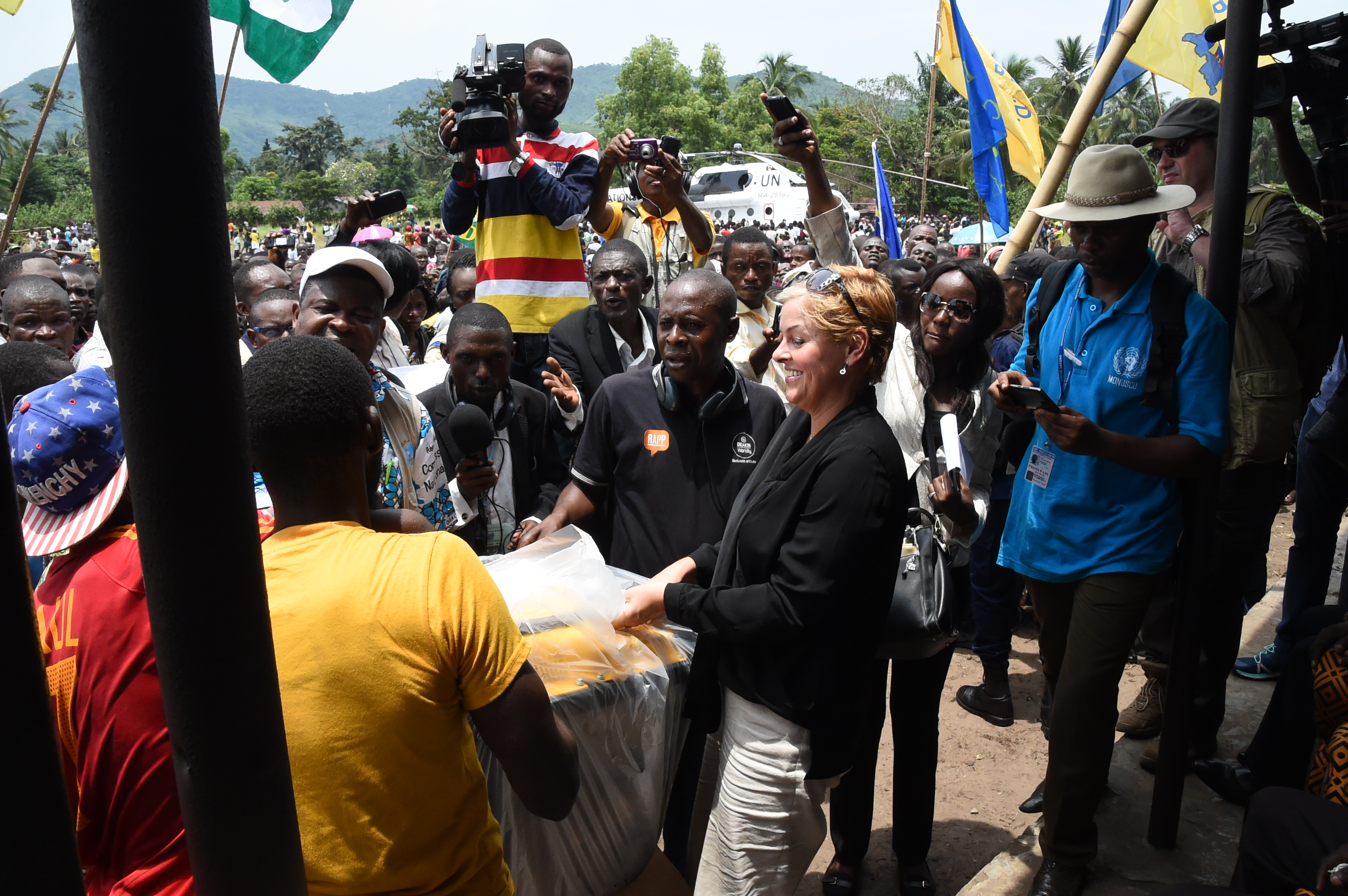
- A crowd gathering in the city to see MONUSCO officials

- Location within Democratic Republic of the Congo
- Coordinates: 5.692281°S 16.586051°E
- Country: Democratic Republic of the Congo
- Province: Kwango
- Territory: Popokabaka

Popokabaka is a city in the Kwango Province, Democratic Republic of the Congo. It is the administrative center of Popokabaka Territory.

Popokabaka lies on the right bank of the river Kwango River. Francis Dhanis, an agent of the Congo Free State, established a station here around 1890. The territory of Popokabaka borders with Angola in the west. For a long time Popokabaka was the commercial center for trade with Portuguese traders who were selling essential items and buying local products. The military post at Popokabaka was used to control the flow of rubber into Portuguese Congo.

The city is the seat of the Roman Catholic Diocese of Popokabaka.

It is served by Popokabaka Airport, a 1,140 metres (3,740 ft) grass airstrip.
