= Kwango =

Province of the Democratic Republic of the Congo

Kwango Province du Kwango (French)
- Province
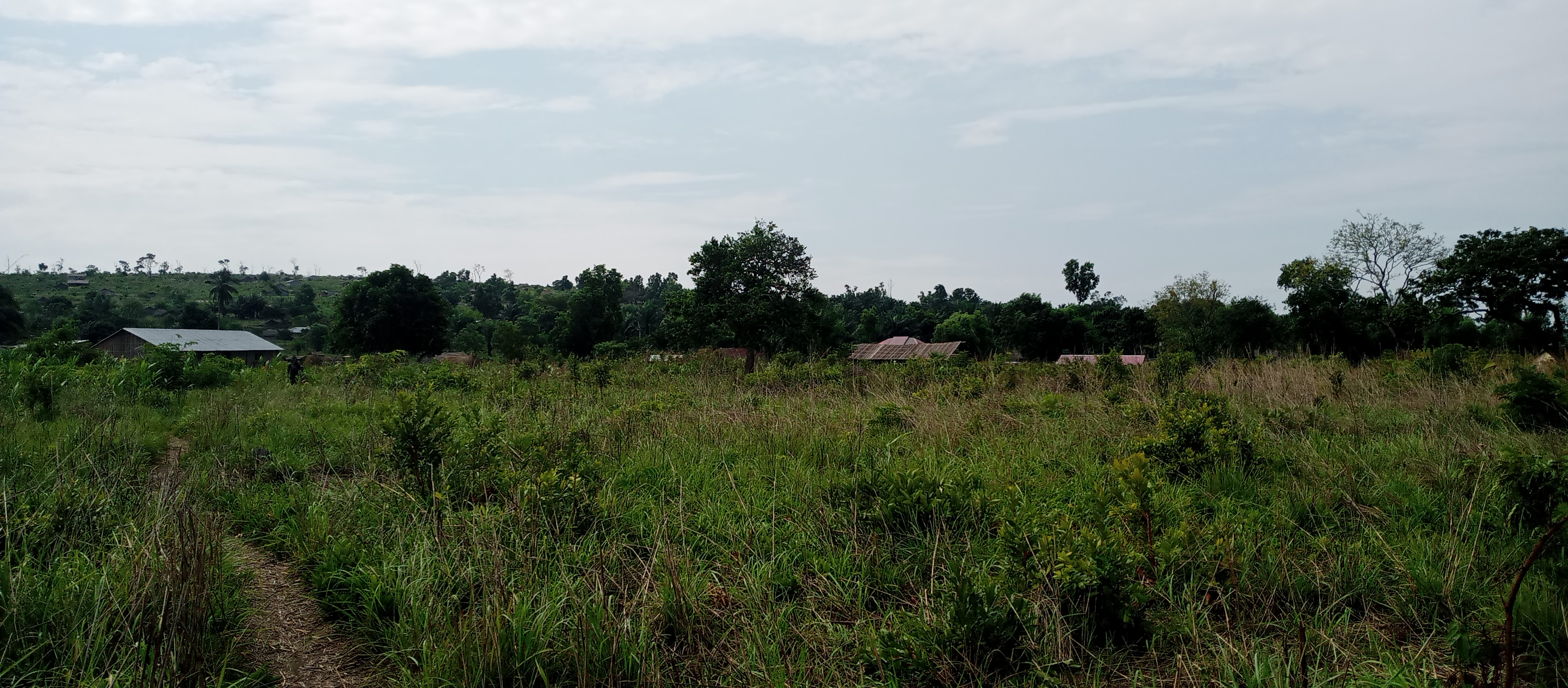

- Seal

- Coordinates: 4°49′18.64″S 17°2′23.57″E
- Country: DR Congo
- Established: 2015
- Named for: Kwango River
- Capital: Kenge

Government
  - Governor: Willy Bitwisila

Area
  - Total: 89,974 km^{2} (34,739 sq mi)

Population (2024 est.)
  - Total: 2,812,000
  - Density: 31.25/km^{2} (80.95/sq mi)

Ethnic groups
  - Native: Bayaka • Basuku • Balunda • Chokwe • Baholu • Bakwese
- Time zone: UTC+1 (West Africa Time)
- License Plate Code: (Democratic Republic of the Congo) CGO / 11
- Official language: French
- National language: Kikongo ya leta

Kwango is a province of the Democratic Republic of the Congo. It is one of the 21 provinces created in the 2015 repartitioning. Kwango, Kwilu, and Mai-Ndombe provinces are the result of the dismemberment of the former Bandundu province. Kwango was formed from the Kwango district whose town of Kenge was made the provincial capital and thus gained city status.

The province takes its name from the Kwango River, a tributary of the Kasai River that defines part of the international boundary between the DRC and Angola.

== Geography ==
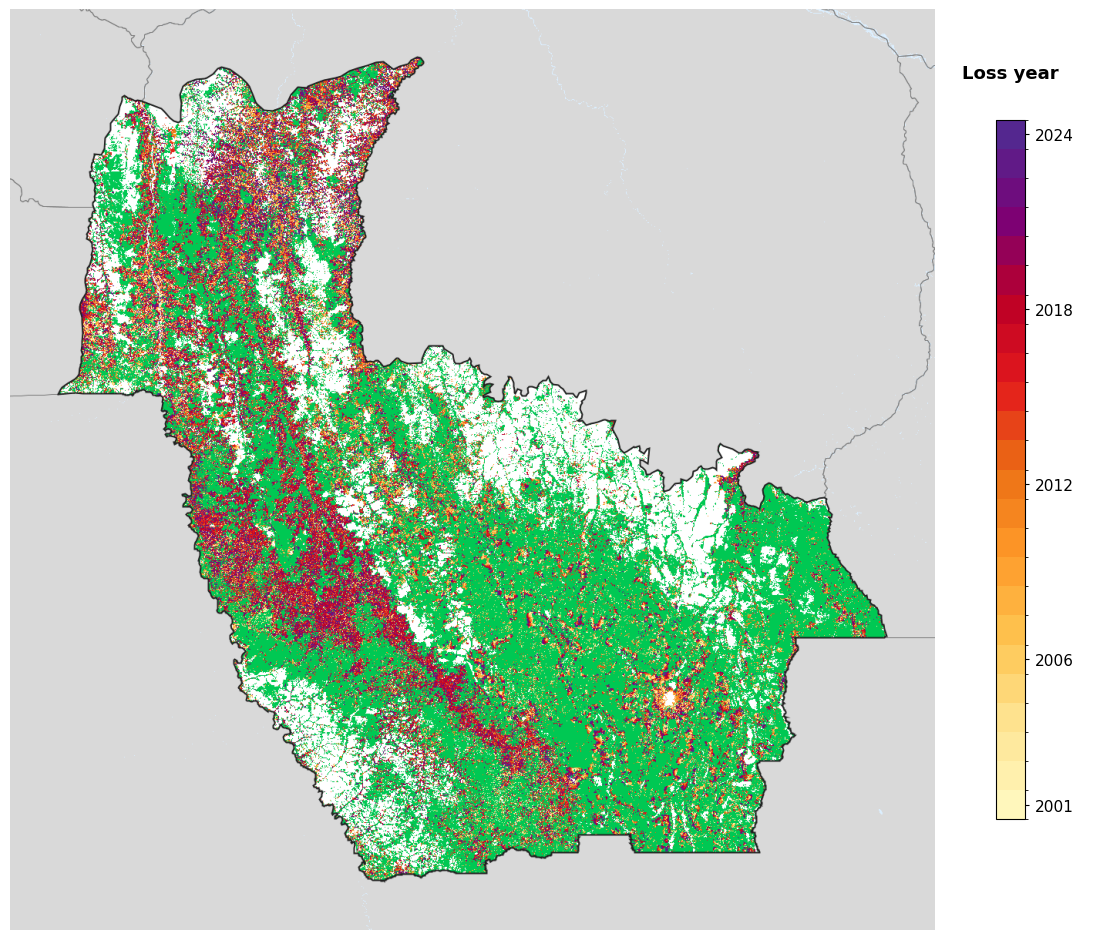
Tree-cover loss year in Kwango, 2001-2024, from the Global Forest Change dataset.

Kwango is located in the southwestern Democratic Republic of the Congo. It has an international border with Angola to the south, and borders on the provinces of Kongo Central to the west, Kinshasa to the northwest, Kwilu to the north, and Kasaï to the east. The entire province has a tropical savanna climate by the Köppen-Geiger climate classification.

== Administration ==
The capital of Kwango is Kenge, and other towns in the region are Popokabaka, Feshi, Kasongo Lunda, Lusanga and Kahemba.

Kwango is divided in to five territories and one independently administered city.

Administrative division	Type	Map
Kenge	City	Kenge
Feshi	Territory	Feshi
Kahemba	Territory	Kahemba
Kasongo-Lunda	Territory	Kasongo-Lunda
Kenge	Territory	Kenge
Popokabaka	Territory	Popokabaka

== History ==
Kwango previously existed as a province from 1962 to 1966. Presidents (from 1965, governors)

- 23 September 1962 – 11 November 1962 Albert Delvaux (fl. 1918)
- November 1962 Emmanuel Mayamba
- 1962 – April 1963 Alphonse Pashi
- August 1963 – April 1964 Pierre Masikita (1st time)
- April 1964 – 30 September 1964 Belunda Kavunzu
- 30 September 1964 –24 August 1965 Joseph Kulumba
- 24 August 1965 – 25 April 1966 Pierre Masikita (2nd time)

From 1966 to 2015, Kwango was administered as a district as part of Bandundu Province, later returning to full provincial status with its capital based at Kenge on 18 July 2015.

In December 2024, deputy provincial governor Rémy Saki reported that between 10 and 25 November, between 67 and 143 people had died of an unknown disease in the Panzi health zone. Apollinaire Yumba, the province's health minister, requested that citizens stay away from dead bodies and urged outside groups to give medical aid. World Health Organization officials were also in the region to collect samples.
