= Sud-Ubangi =

Province of the Democratic Republic of the Congo

Sud-Ubangi Province du Sud-Ubangi (French)
- Province
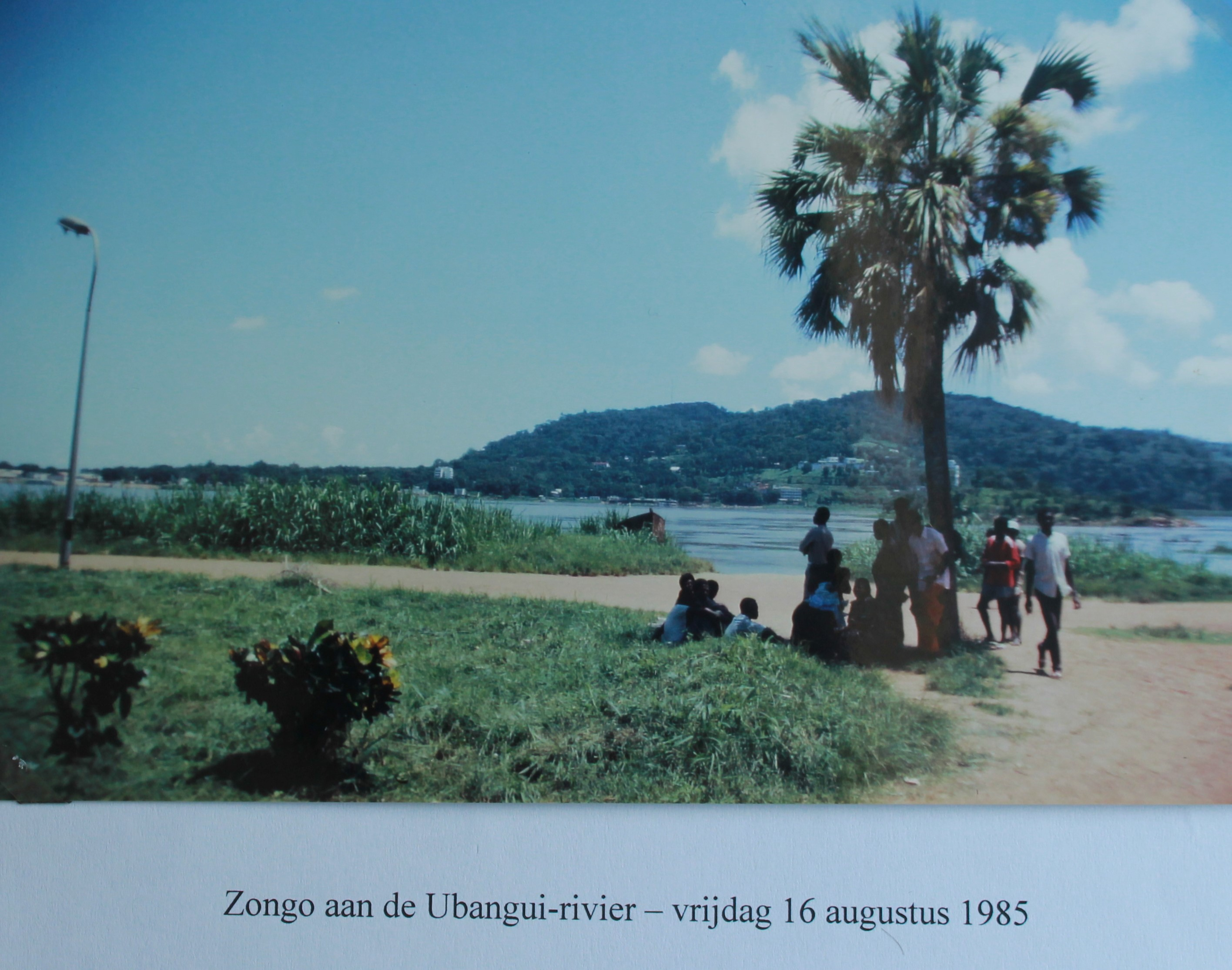
- Zongo on the Ubangi river (August 1985)

- Coordinates: 3°15′N 19°46′E
- Country: DR Congo
- Established: 2015
- Named after: Ubangi River
- Capital: Gemena

Government
  - Governor: Michée Mobonga

Area
  - Total: 51,648 km^{2} (19,941 sq mi)

Population (2020 est.)
  - Total: 2,987,100
  - Density: 57.836/km^{2} (149.79/sq mi)

Ethnic groups
  - Native: Mbaka • Ngombe • Bala • Ngbandi • Gbaya • Bamboma • Bozaba • Bamwe • Likila • Dzando • Ndobo • Budja • Aka
- Time zone: UTC+1 (West Africa Time)
- License Plate Code: (Democratic Republic of the Congo) CGO / 23
- Official language: French, Lingala

Sud-Ubangi (French for "South Ubangi") is one of the 21 provinces of the Democratic Republic of the Congo created in the 2015 repartitioning. It lies in the northwest of the country on the Ubangi River.

Sud-Ubangi, Équateur, Mongala, Nord-Ubangi, and Tshuapa provinces are the result of the dismemberment of the former Équateur province. Sud-Ubangi was formed from the Sud-Ubangi district and the independently administered city of Zongo. The town of Gemena was elevated to capital city of the new province.

The 2020 population was estimated to be 2,987,100.

== Administration ==
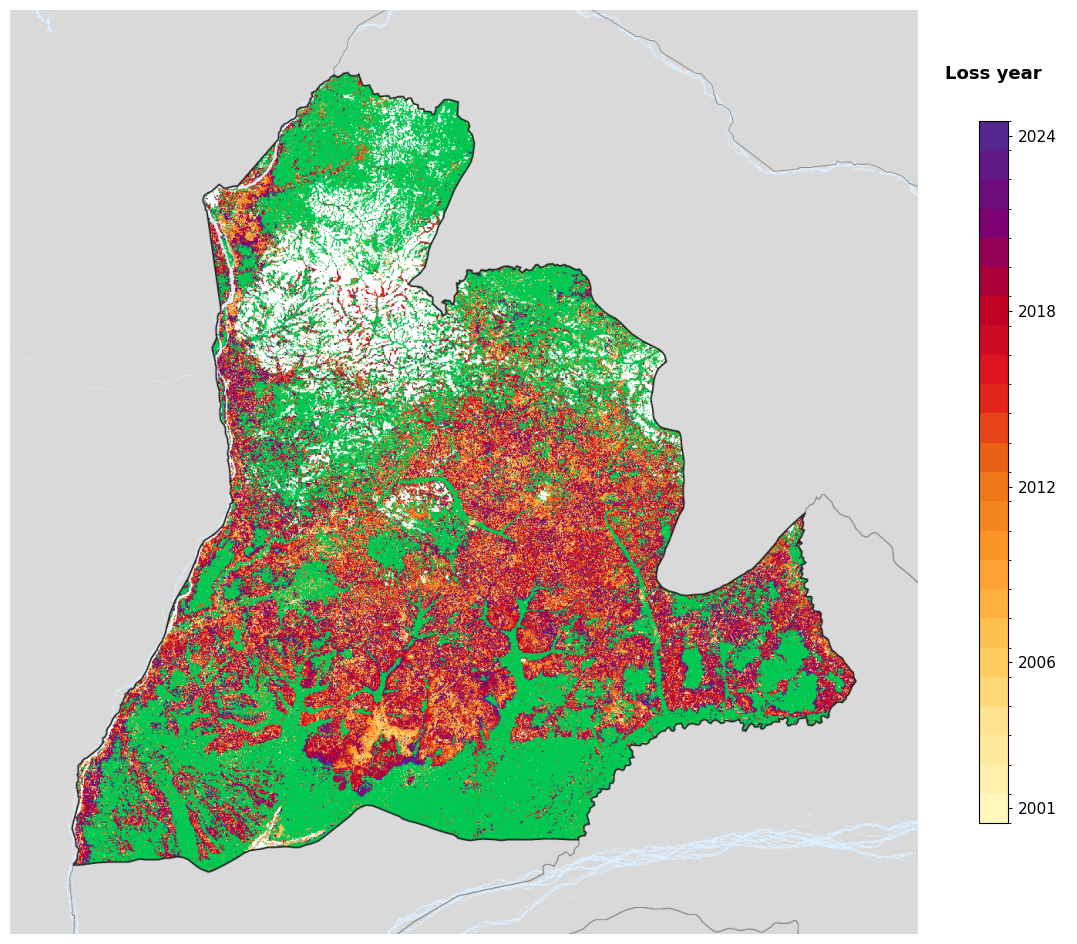
Tree-cover loss year in Sud-Ubangi, 2001-2024, from the Global Forest Change dataset.

The province is divided in to four territories and two independently administered cities.

Administrative division	Type	Map
Gemena	City	Gemena
Zongo	City	Zongo
Budjala	Territory	Budjala
Gemena	Territory	Gemena
Kungu	Territory	Kungu
Libenge	Territory	Libenge
