= Kenge, Kwango =

Kenge
- Provincial capital and city
- Ville de Kenge
- Location in the Democratic Republic of the Congo
- Coordinates: 4°48′20″S 17°02′30″E
- Country: DR Congo
- Province: Kwango Province
- Communes: Cinq Mai, Laurent Desire Kabila, Manonga, Masikita, Mavula

Government
  - Mayor: Noël Kuketuka

Population (2012)
  - Total: 44,743
- Time zone: UTC+1 (West Africa Time)
- Climate: Aw
- National language: Kikongo ya Leta

Kenge is the capital of Kwango Province in the Democratic Republic of the Congo. As of 2012 it had an estimated population of 44,743.

== Transport ==
The town is served by Kenge Airport.
