= Cities of the Democratic Republic of the Congo =

Provincial cities of the Democratic Republic of the Congo
- Cities marked in red are provincial capitals (Note: click mark for city article)
- Category: 2nd-level administrative division of a unitary state
- Location: DR Congo
- Found in: Province
- Number: 33 (as of 2023)
- Additional status: National Assembly constituency; Provincial Assembly constituency
- Government: Appointed administration
- Subdivisions: Communes

The cities of the Democratic Republic of the Congo are administrative divisions of provinces with the exception of Kinshasa which itself has the status of a province. Cities are further divided into communes. They are led by mayors except for Kinshasa which is led by a governor.

== Provincial cities ==
The 25 provinces of DR Congo are divided into 33 cities (fr. villes, sing. ville) and 145 territories (fr. territoires, sing. territoire). Each provincial division is also a constituency of the National Assembly as well as of the Provincial Assembly of its province.

Each city is led by a mayor (fr. maire) and is further divided into communes with each commune led by a burgomaster (fr. bourgmestre). Currently mayors, burgomasters, and their deputies are appointed by the government. Elections to bring about elected local government in provincial capitals are scheduled for December 2023—September 2024.

All provincial capitals are, by organic law, cities and do not need to meet the requirement of having a population of at least 100,000.

== Kinshasa ==
The capital city of Kinshasa is a one of a kind administrative division due to article 2 of the Constitution which makes it a division of the country and gives it the status of a province. In practice this means that—like a province—it has a provincial government with an elected governor and an Assembly, but—like a city—it is divided into communes led by burgomasters. Uniquely, its 24 communes are also Provincial Assembly constituencies and are grouped into four National Assembly constituencies.

== List of cities ==
Cities directly represented in the 2024–2028 National Assembly
| City | | Province | No. Com. | Assembly Seats | | Coordinates | Pre-2015 Province |
| City | | Province | No. Com. | Nat'l (500) | Prov'l (elected) | Coordinates | Pre-2015 Province |
|---|---|---|---|---|---|---|---|
| Bandundu | ✪ | Kwilu | 3 | 2 | 3 of 43 | 3°19′S 17°23′E | Bandundu |
| Beni | | North Kivu | 4 | 2 | 2 of 44 | 0°30′00″N 29°28′00″E | North Kivu |
| Boende | ✪ | Tshuapa | 2 | 1 | 1 of 17 | 0°13′11″S 20°51′36″E | Équateur (old) |
| Boma | | Kongo Central | 3 | 2 | 3 of 36 | 5°51′S 13°03′E | Bas-Congo |
| Bukavu | ✪ | South Kivu | 3 | 5 | 7 of 44 | 2°30′00″S 28°52′00″E | South Kivu |
| Bunia | ✪ | Ituri | 3 | 2 | 3 of 43 | 1°33′37″N 30°14′24″E | Orientale |
| Buta | ✪ | Bas-Uélé | 4 | 1 | 1 of 17 | 2°49′N 24°44′E | Orientale |
| Butembo | | North Kivu | 4 | 4 | 4 of 44 | 0°07′30″N 29°17′56″E | North Kivu |
| Gbadolite | ✪ | Nord-Ubangi | 3 | 1 | 2 of 17 | 4°16′30″N 21°00′00″E | Équateur (old) |
| Gemena | ✪ | Sud-Ubangi | 4 | 1 | 2 of 26 | 3°15′00″N 19°46′00″E | Équateur (old) |
| Goma | ✪ | North Kivu | 2 | 4 | 4 of 44 | 1°40′46″S 29°14′01″E | North Kivu |
| Inongo | ✪ | Mai-Ndombe | 3 | 1 | 1 of 17 | 1°56′S 18°17′E | Bandundu |
| Isiro | ✪ | Haut-Uélé | 3 | 1 | 1 of 18 | 2°47′00″N 27°37′00″E | Orientale |
| Kabinda | ✪ | Lomami | 4 | 1 | 1 of 25 | 6°07′47″S 24°28′48″E | Kasaï-Oriental (old) |
| Kalemie | ✪ | Tanganyika | 3 | 2 | 3 of 23 | 5°54′53″S 29°11′38″E | Katanga |
| Kamina | ✪ | Haut-Lomami | 3 | 1 | 1 of 24 | 8°44′06″S 24°59′53″E | Katanga |
| Kananga | ✪ | Kasaï-Central | 5 | 4 | 6 of 31 | 5°53′49″S 22°26′56″E | Kasaï-Occidental |
| Kenge | ✪ | Kwango | 5 | 1 | 1 of 22 | 4°48′20″S 17°02′30″E | Bandundu |
| Kikwit | | Kwilu | 4 | 3 | 4 of 43 | 5°02′00″S 18°49′00″E | Bandundu |
| Kindu | ✪ | Maniema | 3 | 1 | 3 of 20 | 2°57′00″S 25°55′00″E | Maniema |
| Kinshasa | | n/a | 24 | 56 | 44 | 4°19′24″S 15°18′29″E | n/a |
| Kisangani | ✪ | Tshopo | 6 | 6 | 9 of 27 | 0°30′55″N 25°11′28″E | Orientale |
| Kolwezi | ✪ | Lualaba | 2 | 3 | 6 of 22 | 10°43′00″S 25°28′00″E | Katanga |
| Likasi | | Haut-Katanga | 4 | 3 | 4 of 44 | 10°59′00″S 26°44′00″E | Katanga |
| Lisala | ✪ | Mongala | 2 | 1 | 1 of 18 | 2°08′N 21°31′E | Équateur (old) |
| Lubumbashi | ✪ | Haut-Katanga | 7 | 14 | 20 of 44 | 11°40′11″S 27°27′29″E | Katanga |
| Lumumbaville | | Sankuru | 2 | 1 | 1 of 23 | 4°04′29″S 24°33′05″E | Kasaï-Oriental (old) |
| Lusambo | ✪ | Sankuru | 4 | 1 | 1 of 23 | 4°58′11″S 23°25′48″E | Kasaï-Oriental (old) |
| Matadi | ✪ | Kongo Central | 3 | 3 | 4 of 36 | 5°49′00″S 13°29′00″E | Bas-Congo |
| Mbandaka | ✪ | Équateur | 2 | 2 | 3 of 19 | 0°02′55″N 18°15′37″E | Équateur (old) |
| Mbuji-Mayi | ✪ | Kasaï-Oriental | 5 | 6 | 10 of 22 | 6°07′15″S 23°35′48″E | Kasaï-Oriental (old) |
| Mwene-Ditu | | Lomami | 3 | 1 | 3 of 25 | 7°00′S 23°27′E | Kasaï-Oriental (old) |
| Tshikapa | ✪ | Kasaï | 5 | 2 | 4 of 30 | 6°25′00″S 20°48′00″E | Kasaï-Occidental |
| Zongo | | Sud-Ubangi | 2 | 1 | 1 of 26 | 4°21′N 18°36′E | Équateur (old) |
| Total | | | 139 | 140 | | | |
✪ provincial capital

Due to the lack of reliable and comparable population figures, electoral districts are allocated seats in proportion to their voter registration numbers. The number of seats allocated to a city in the National Assembly and the Provincial Assembly is one measure of its relative political importance nationally and within its province respectively.

In 2018 cities accounted for 27% of the electorate, or 16% when Kinshasa is excluded.

== Cities in the making ==
In mid-2018, just before the general election of that year, the government upheld the 2013 granting of city status to a large number of populated places, including 65 not listed above. It was further decided to make these cities operational in stages. Since then the following ones have had their first mayor appointed and take office but are not National Assembly districts :

Settlements transforming into cities
| Name | Province | No. Com. | Mayor | Coordinates | Pre-2015 Province |
|---|---|---|---|---|---|
| Baraka | South Kivu | 3 | Jacques Mmbucwa | 4°06′15″S 29°05′38″E | South Kivu |
| Kamituga | South Kivu | 2 | Alexandre Bundya | 3°04′S 28°11′E | South Kivu |
| Kasaji | Lualaba | 3 | Georges Kazadi | 10°22′00″S 23°27′00″E | Katanga |
| Kasumbalesa | Haut Katanga | 3 | André Kapamba | 12°15′23″S 27°48′10″E | Katanga |
| Oicha | North Kivu | 3 | Faustin Kambale Siluhwere | 0°41′51″N 29°31′11″E | North Kivu |
| Tshimbulu | Kasaï-Central | 3 | Marcel Mutamba | 6°29′S 22°51′E | Kasaï Occidental |
| Uvira | South Kivu | 3 | Kiza Muhato | 3°24′16″S 29°08′16″E | South Kivu |

== See also ==
- Subdivisions of the Democratic Republic of the Congo
- Communes of the Democratic Republic of the Congo

== Cited works ==
- "Constitution de la Republique Democratique du Congo" [The Constitution of the Democratic Republic of the Congo] (PDF). LEGANET.CD (in French). 20 January 2011. Archived (PDF) from the original on 21 February 2019.
- "Loi organique n° 08/016 du 07 octobre 2008 portant composition, organisation et fonctionnement des Entités Territoriales Décentralisées et leurs rapports avec l'Etat et les Provinces" [Organic Law No. 08/016 of 7 October 2008 on the composition, organization and functioning of the Decentralized Territorial Entities and their relations with the State and the Provinces]. LEGANET.CD (in French). Archived from the original on 21 February 2019.
- "Loi n° 06/006 du 09 mars 2006 portant organisation des élections présidentielle, législatives, provinciales, urbaines, municipales et locales telle que modifiée par la Loi n°11/003 du 25 juin 2011, la Loi n° 15/001 du 12 février 2015 et la Loi n° 17/013 du 24 décembre 2017" [Law no. 06/006 of 9 March 2006 on the organization of presidential, legislative, provincial, city, commune and local elections as amended by Law no. 11/003 of 25 June 2011, Law no. 15/001 of 12 February 2015, and Law no. 17/013 of 24 December 2017] (PDF). www.ceni.cd (in French). Archived (PDF) from the original on 26 December 2023.
- "Loi n°22/029 du 29 juin 2022 modifiant complétant la loi n°06/006 du 9 mars 2006 portant organisation des élections présidentielle, législatives, provinciales, urbaines, municipales et locales telle que modifiée par la loi n°11/003 du 25 juin 2011, la loi n°15/001 du 12 février 2015 et la loi n°17/013 du 24 décembre 2017" [Law no. 22/029 of 29 June 2022 amending and supplementing law no. 06/006 of 9 March 2006 on the organization of presidential, legislative, provincial, city, commune and local elections as amended by law no. 11/003 of 25 June 2011, law no. 15/001 of 12 February 2015 and law no. 17/013 of 24 December 2017.] (PDF). www.ceni.cd (in French). Archived (PDF) from the original on 12 July 2023.
- "Annexe I : De la repartition des sieges pour l'election des deputes nationaux" [Annex I: On the Distribution of Seats for the Election of National Deputies]. Annexes a la loi portant adoption de la repartition des sieges par circonscription electorale pour les elections legislatives (PDF) (in French). CENI. pp. 3–13. Archived from the original (PDF) on 20 September 2018.
- "Annexe III: De la repartition des sieges pour l'election des conseillers municipaux" [Annex III: On the Distribution of Seats for the Election of Commune Councilors]. Annexes a la loi portant adoption de la repartition des sieges par circonscription electorale pour les elections legislatives (PDF) (in French). CENI. pp. 25–37. Archived from the original (PDF) on 20 September 2018.
- "Listes définitives des candidatures à l'élection des députés nationaux-Sankuru" (PDF). www.ceni.cd (in French). CENI. Archived (PDF) from the original on 29 January 2024.
- "Listes définitives des candidatures à l'élection des députés provinciaux-Tshuapa" (PDF). www.ceni.cd (in French). CENI. Archived (PDF) from the original on 28 December 2023.
- Journal officiel de la République Démocratique du Congo (PDF) (in French) (Special ed.). 20 June 2013. Archived (PDF) from the original on 12 January 2020.
- "Décret n° 18/020 du 30 mai 2018" (PDF). Journal officiel de la République Démocratique du Congo (in French). 59 (13). col 13-14. 1 July 2019.
- "Arrêté Interministeriel n° 25/CAB/VPM/MININTERSEC/HMS/081/2018 & n° CAB/ME/MIN.DRI/ARN/FKT/007/2018 du 30 Mai 2018" (PDF). www.lualaba.gouv.cd (in French). Archived from the original (PDF) on 30 September 2019.
- "Arrêté Provincial n°01/14/CAB/G.P/K.C/MKM/057/2019 du 05 Septembre 2019". Arretes-du-Gouverneur-Kabuya-portant-nomination-titre-interimaire_Maires-Maires-adjoints-Administrateurs-des-territoires.pdf (PDF) (in French). Congo Research Group. 2019. pp. 2–3.
- Le Potentiel (25 July 2018). "Décentralisation : les autorités traditionnelles de la RDC en colère contre le Premier ministre". Digital Congo (in French). MMC. Archived from the original on 25 July 2018.
- Jean-Luc M. (25 February 2019). "Sud-Kivu : les maires des nouvelles villes d'Uvira et Kamituga installés ce week-end, celui de Baraka ce lundi". La Prunelle RDC (in French). Archived from the original on 28 June 2022.
- "Territoriale-Kasumbalesa : André Kapamba premier maire de la nouvelle ville". Nzadi News (in French). 7 March 2019.
- "RDC : Le Président Félix Tshisekedi dote la mairie de Lumumbaville de matériels de travail". Provinces 26 RDC (in French). 16 February 2022.
- Lumwanga, Stanislas (26 Nov 2022). "Territoriales 2022 : Georges Kazadi et Nana Nseya, deux serviteurs du développement de Kasaji au front". Lualaba ma province (in French).
- Makoba, Alain Saveur (17 September 2022). "Kasaï-Central : La ville de Tshimbulu menacée de disparition par plus de 25 têtes d'érosions (Société civile)". 7sur7.cd (in French).
- "RDC : nomination de nouveaux acteurs de la petite territoriale". Radio Okapi (in French). 27 November 2022.
- Dianzenza, Lucien (29 Dec 2022). "Kinshasa : le gouverneur Ngobila rencontre les nouveaux bourgmestres" (in French). Agence d’information d’Afrique Centrale (ADIAC).
- "RDC: le gouvernement adopte l'opérationnalistation de Lumumba-ville (Wembo-Nyama) en tant que ville". Actualite.cd (in French). 2020-06-27.
- Mariboyi, Elie (19 June 2026). "Nord-Kivu : Le premier Maire de la ville d'Oicha prend officiellement ses fonctions devant plusieurs autorités et personnalités". Oasis Congo (in French).
