= Rail transport in the Democratic Republic of the Congo =

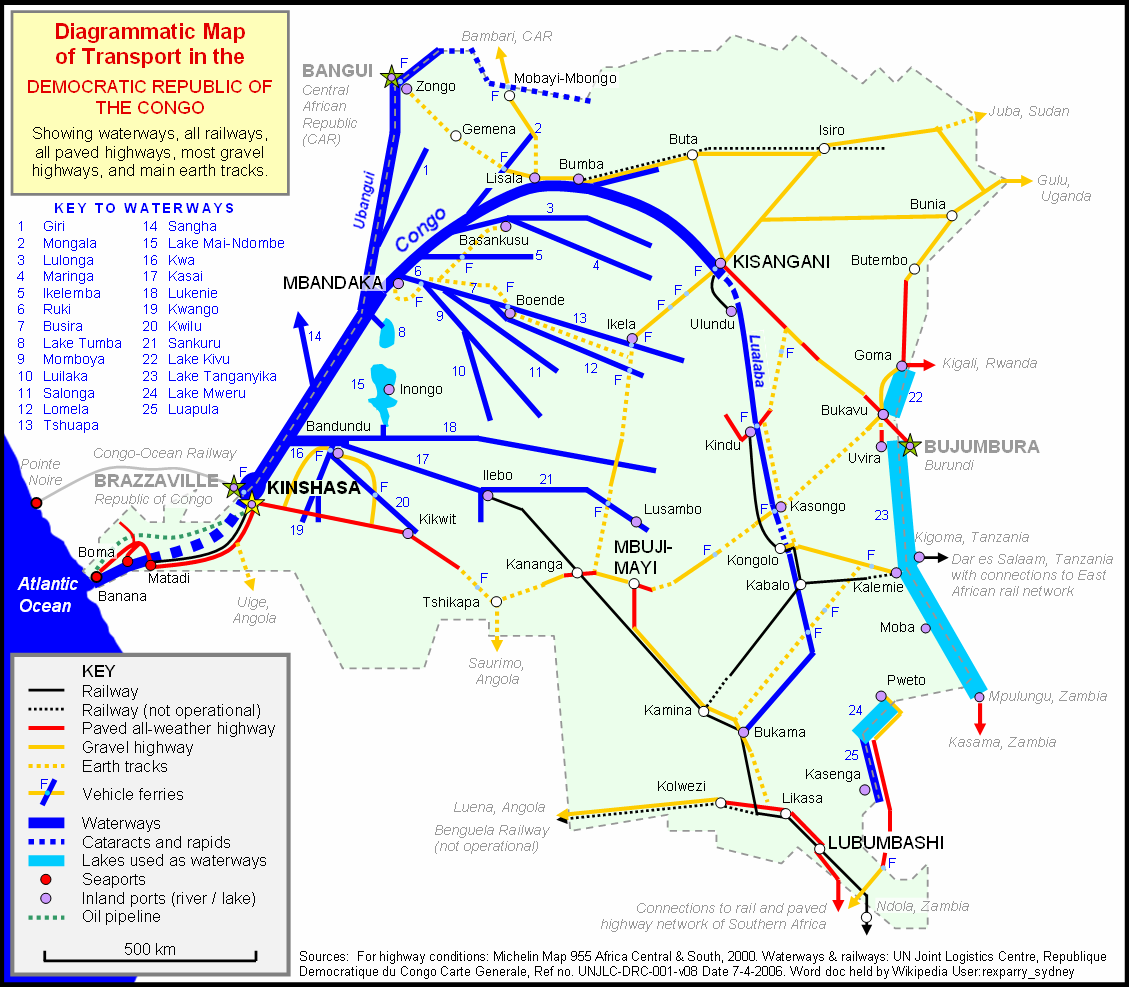
Diagrammatic Map of rail and other methods of surface transport in the DRC. Railways are in black.

Map of rail network pre-1960

Rail transport is provided in the Democratic Republic of the Congo by the Société Nationale des Chemins de Fer du Congo (SNCC), the Société commerciale des transports et des ports (SCTP) (previously Office National des Transports (ONATRA) until 2011), and the Office des Chemins de fer des Ueles (CFU).

The national system is mostly operated by the Société Nationale des Chemins de Fer du Congo, SNCC. Not all rail lines link up, but they are generally connected by river transport. The rail systems are listed below.

== Routes ==
=== Matadi-Kinshasa Railway ===
(Operational as of March 2026)

From Matadi to Kinshasa via Songolo, Kimpese and Kasangulu. 366 km, 1,067 mm (3 ft 6 in) gauge. A 2019 timetable states one passenger train per week. Operated by SCTP (ex ONATRA). Beyond Matadi the line continues to oil terminals at Ango Ango (7 km). At Mwala Kinsende there is a branch to Mbanza-Ngungu (15 km) where there are railway workshops. In Kinshasa a branch was constructed in 1968 to N'Djili Airport (13 km) but this has been out-of-use for many years. Beyond Kinshasa East the line extends to riverside wharves (2 km). The line was originally constructed as 765 mm (2 ft 6 1/8 in) gauge; In 1928, Congo (Belgium) and Angola (Portugal) did a land exchange to facilitate the new route of the railway to Kinshasa. This line is a bypass of the Livingstone Falls on the Congo River, known as a portage railway. Upstream from the Kinshasa river port, water transport reaches about two-thirds of the country. The line lost traffic to road transport when the Matadi-Kinshasa road was re-established in 2000, and it is now planned to revitalize it with Chinese help. An agreement was signed in July 2006 between ONATRA and a Chinese company (CMIC) which will renovate the track, trains, telecommunications, signal system and electric supply. The line reopened in September 2015 after around a decade without regular service. As of April 2016 there was one passenger trip per week along the line and more frequent service was planned.

=== Vicicongo line ===
(Out of use in 2022)

Bumba (Congo river port) - Aketi - Buta - Likati - Isiro - Mungbere, with branch lines to Bondo and Titule. 1,031 km, 600 mm (1 ft 11 5/8 in) gauge. The line was opened by the Société des Chemins de Fer Vicinaux du Congo between 1926 and 1937. Alternative sources state a line length of 1,235 km (741 mi) long.

=== Great lakes line first section ===
(Believed operational in 2022)

Kisangani (Congo River port) to Ubundu (upper Congo River port). 125 km, 1,000 mm (3 ft 3 3/8 in) gauge. This line is a bypass (portage railway) of the Stanley Falls on the Congo River. A train runs after arrival at Kisangani of a ship from Kinshasa or before departure of a ship to Kinshasa, which may happen about every 2 to 3 month, no fixed schedule. There is no connecting boat service between Ubundu and Kindu on the Lualaba River (the upper Congo).

=== Great lakes line second section ===
(Believed operational in 2022)

Kindu (Lualaba River port) - Kibombo – Kongolo – Kabalo (Lualaba River port and junction with Katanga line) - Nyunzu – Niemba – Kalemie (the port on Lake Tanganyika). 714 km, 1,067 mm (3 ft 6 in) gauge. This line was 1,000 mm (3 ft 3 3/8 in) gauge like the first section until 1955, when the gauge was changed for the connection with the Katanga line in 1956. Just north of Kongolo, the Lualaba is unnavigable due to the rapids named Portes D'Enfer ('Gates of Hell'). The track between Kalemie and Niemba is described by UNJLC in 2006 as 'very degraded' and may not be operational. Boats to Moba and Kalundu-Uvira on Lake Tanganyika used to connect with trains at Kalemie. In 1917 a train ferry was introduced on the lake operating from Kalemie, but is long gone.

=== Katanga line ===
(Believed operational in 2022)

Kabalo (Lualaba River port and junction with Great Lakes line) – Kamungu - Katumba – Kabongo (or a town 8 km south-east) – Kamina (junction with Kasia line) - Bukama (Lualaba River port) – Tenke (junction with Benguela Railway) - Likasi – Lubumbashi - Sakania - Zambia. 1,302 km, 1,067 mm (3 ft 6 in) gauge. There are a number of short branch lines in the mining areas between Tenke and Kolwezi. The section from near Kabongo to Kamina was described by UNJLC in 2006 as 'very degraded'.

=== Kasai line ===
(Believed operational in 2022)

Ilebo (Kasai River port) – Kananga – Mwene Ditu – Kaniama - Kamina (junction with Katanga line). 978 km, 1,067 mm (3 ft 6 in) gauge. This connects the Katanga line to the river port at Ilebo from where boats can reach Kinshasa. Freight is transferred to river barges, but in 2006 UNJLC reports the river service operates sporadically. On 1 August 2007 a passenger train ran out of control on the line 170 km north-west of Kananga and 7 coaches overturned, killing about 100 people.

=== Katanga-Benguela line ===
A branch of the Katanga Railway was built from Tenke junction just north-west of Likasi via Kolwezi to Dilolo at the Angolan border. 522 km, 1,067 mm (3 ft 6 in) gauge. This connects with the Benguela Railway from Luau to the Atlantic port of Lobito. This allowed through passenger trains to run between Lubumbashi and Lobito, and freight trains to carry copper from the Zambian and Katangan Copperbelts to a seaport for the export of copper. It was this purpose which provided the investment for the Benguela Railway. It did not operate through Angola from the 1980s, due to the civil war there. The line between Kolwezi and Dilolo was described by UNJLC in 2006 as 'very degraded'. It reopened in 2018. In 2023, the Lobito Atlantic Railway took over this corridor.

The following lines have been completely removed and are not listed for future rehabilitation:

- Mayumbe line: Boma to Tshela, 1889–1984, 610 mm (2 ft) gauge, 140 km long and opened in stages from 1901 to 1913. removed in 1984.
- Kivu Railway: Kalundu-Uvira-Kamaniola (- Bukavu), 1931–1958, 1,067 mm (3 ft 6 in) gauge. 94 km long.
- Forminière railway 1923–1955, 600 mm (1 ft 11 5/8 in) gauge, 93 km long. Followed the river Kasai from Charlesville to Makumbi.

== Electrification ==
A programme of electrification at 25kV AC was undertaken between 1952 and the early 1970s (specific completion date not identified). This covered:

- 600 km of the Katanga line from Lubumbashi via Tenke to Kamina.
- 252 km of the Katanga-Benguela line from Tenke to Mutshatsha.

== Track totals ==
4,772 km (2002), 5,138 km (1995);
narrow gauge:

- 3,621 km 1,067 mm (3 ft 6 in) gauge (858 km electrified); (2002)
- 3,987 km 1,067 mm (3 ft 6 in) gauge (858 km electrified); (1996)
- 125 km 1,000 mm (3 ft 3 3/8 in) gauge; (2002) ev. transformed to 1,067 mm (3 ft 6 in) gauge in 1955
- 1,026 km 600 mm (1 ft 11 5/8 in) gauge (2002);

The above figures are open to interpretation. A detailed list of railway lines, stations, and track distances is available here 'https://www.branchline.uk/jfpdf/zairerlys.pdf'

== Railway links to adjacent countries ==
There are currently two functioning international links:

- Zambia - yes - same gauge - 1,067 mm (3 ft 6 in), connects with railways of Zimbabwe, Mozambique and South Africa.
- Angola - yes - same gauge - 1,067 mm (3 ft 6 in). The link to the ports of Benguela and Lobito was unusable from the 1970s, but has been rehabilitated. The Angolan transport minister Augusto da Silva Tomás promised the reconstruction up to the border station at Luau in Moxico province by the end of 2012. The focus was then on the line from Dilolo to Kolwezi. The line reopened in 2018.

Proposed Link:

- In 2012, Angola started plans for a line from Luanda via the Matadi Bridge to the enclave of Cabinda province which necessarily crosses Congo territory, with a junction with Congo's Matadi-Kinshasa Railway.

There are boat links to rail lines in these neighbouring countries:

- Republic of Congo - no direct link, but ordinary ferries across the Congo River from Kinshasa to Brazzaville can take passengers and freight to the Congo-Ocean Railway (same gauge 1,067 mm (3 ft 6 in)) which runs from Brazzaville to the Atlantic port of Pointe Noire.
- Tanzania - no direct link but boats take freight between Kalemie and Kigoma, from where Tanzania's Central Line runs to the seaport of Dar es Salaam; there once was a train ferry from Kalemie built in 1917; break of gauge 1,067 mm (3 ft 6 in)/1,000 mm (3 ft 3 3/8 in).

These neighbouring countries have rail systems, but there are no links from the Congo:

- South Sudan - no - same gauge 1,067 mm (3 ft 6 in)
- Uganda - no - break of gauge 1,067 mm (3 ft 6 in)/1,000 mm (3 ft 3 3/8 in).

These neighbouring countries have no rail systems: Central African Republic, Rwanda and Burundi.

== Proposed rail projects ==
- In September 2007 it was reported that China would provide US$5 billion for new infrastructure projects including rehabilitation and construction of new sections to link Sakania and Lubumbashi to Matadi (3,200 km), to be completed in 3 years.
- A line from Uganda to Kasese was proposed in 2005.
- In 2012, a new or rehabilitated 1,435 mm (4 ft 8 1/2 in) gauge line was proposed from Kisangani to the port of Lamu in Kenya.
- In 2019, the SNCC reached a $500 million agreement with Russian Railways for the company to help upgrade the DRC's railway system.

== Criticism ==
The rail network in the Democratic Republic of the Congo has experienced numerous accidents due to poor maintenance. The death toll is frequently high, partly due to the practice of train surfing. A major accident in August 2007 led to the death of over 100 people at Benaleka, Kasai-Occidental. In April 2014, 48 people were killed and 160 injured when an SNCC train derailed near Katongola, Katanga Province. 33 were killed in a further incident in November 2017 near Lubudi, Lualaba Province. 32 were killed in an accident in Kasai Province in March 2019. In September 2019 at least 50 persons died as a result of a derailment in Tanganyika.

== World Bank projects ==
Commencing in 1960, the World Bank has supported transport infrastructure projects in the country. These include:

Railway Project (01) [1979]

[abstract] The Societe Nationale des Chemin de Fer Zairois (SNCZ) railway project consists of SNCZ's 1979-1982 investment program and includes essential track rehabilitation, equipment and operational improvements to increase SNCZ's effective capacity to meet traffic demands. The project finances: (a) renewing and upgrading 210 km of track and ballasting another 285 km; (b) 100 ore wagons, 9 shunting locomotives and 12 passenger coaches; (c) spare parts for locomotives and wagons; (d) telecommunications, workshops, data processing and service equipment; (e) extension of Ilebo port facilities; (f) social infrastructure; and (g) middle/senior technical and management staff training and consultant services.

Railway Project (02) [1984]

[abstract] The Second Societe Nationale des Chemins de Fer Zairois (SNCZ) railway project is based on an emergency rehabilitation program prepared by SNCZ and includes: (i) track renewal (about 128 km.); (ii) rehabilitation of about 850 wagons and purchase of another 200; (iii) equipment, materials and spare parts for improved maintenance of track, locomotives and wagons; (iv) consulting services to help strengthen higher management and for studies; (v) equipment and materials for training; (vi) staff training abroad; and (vi) equipment and materials for telecommunications, maintenance of a computer system and replacement of medical equipment. The project also includes technical assistance to the Government for a review of air transport and to help strengthen the studies and planning unit of the Ministry of Transport. The project will help Zaire's processing and export of minerals; transportation of agricultural produce to urban areas and of inputs for agriculture, and facilitate commerce between Zaire's regions.

TRP Project (01) [1989]

[abstract] The First Transport Rehabilitation Project supports the government's objectives and strategy for improving the efficiency of the transport sector. The project involves a component for the Office National des Transports (ONATRA) and a component for Societe Nationale des Chemin de Fer Zairois (SNCZ). The objective of the ONATRA component is institutional reform, it will involve : (i) a major reorganization based on a reorientation of ONATRA's goals and strategic role in the transport sector; (ii) an improvement in its financial performance by restructuring its debt and measures to control its costs; and (iii) an improvement in its operating efficiency by rehabilitating infrastructure, replacing obsolete equipment, developing human resources, and improving management. The main objective of the SNCZ component is to restore capacity and improve operational reliability through : (i) improvement in operational efficiency and reduction of financial deficit; (ii) improvement in its operations by a large program to rehabilitate track and rolling stock, equipment and infrastructure; and (iii) clarification of its relationship with the State through a "Contrat-Programme".

DRC Multi-modal Transport [2010]

DRC Multi-modal Transport Additional Funding [2013]

[abstract] The objectives of the Multi-Modal Transport Project for Congo are: (i) to improve transport connectivity in the Democratic Republic of Congo (DRC) so as to support national economic integration, (ii) to restore societe nationale des chemins de fer du congo financial and operational viability and (iii) to implement sector wide governance plan and strengthen transport State Owned Enterprises (SOEs) operational performance. These objectives were consistent with Government of the Democratic Republic of Congo (GDRC's) transport sector reform goals which are to promote the consolidation of macroeconomic stability and economic growth through the rehabilitation of key transport infrastructure and improved governance; this, in turn, is expected to improve the provision of social services and reduce vulnerability of the poor. This project includes four components: the first component is Societe Nationale des Chemins de Fer du Congo (SNCC) recovery plan, this component promotes the reform of SNCC management and operations through; the second component is operational performance strengthening and improved governance of the transport sector; the third component is international trade procedures simplification, this component includes the development of an international trade procedures simplification strategy and the associated action plan, including provision of materials, equipment and basic infrastructure investments on a pilot basis; and the last fourth component is project management, this component provides for the funding of the project management entity.

== Locomotives ==
On 3 November 2008, four diesel-electric locomotives were supplied to the DRC from China. These are 1,800 hp Co-Co locomotives, model CKD7C, built by the CRN Dalian.

An alternative source gives these as "four diesel-electric locomotives were shipped to Congo (K) in Dalian seaport. There are two types of locomotive including 1,000 Hp CKD5 and 1,800 Hp CKD7C"

The DRC Multi-modal Transport Project [2010, 2013] [World Bank, see above] resulted in the procurement of 38 new diesel-electric locomotives. 20 of these were funded directly by the government of DRC. These were supplied by CNR of China. It is understood that they comprised:

- CK1F2 x 4
- CKD8C4 x 10
- CKD8C1 x 20
- unstated x 4

Exact details have proved difficult to confirm.

"17 June 2015

The National Railway Company of Congo (SNCC) has just received, Tuesday, June 16, two new locomotives in Sakania in Katanga. They are part of eighteen locomotives allocated by the World Bank's multimodal project to the SNCC.

These new locomotives with engines made in the United States were assembled in China. They will be put into circulation for the first time in the DRC. Each unit cost US $ 1.7 million, SNCC sources say. They were towed from Durban in South Africa.

Two other locomotives are already present in the Zambian town of Ndola.

According to a source close to the Agence Congolaise de Presse, eight locomotives are parked at the Port of Durban, awaiting departure formalities for DR Congo.

The chronogram drawn provides for the arrival of all the machines in June, their reception in July and operation next August, it should be remembered.

All these locomotives are part of eighteen ordered by the World Bank as part of the multimodal transport project, PTM in May 2014. The latter is also working to rehabilitate and renew the railway.

With funding from the DRC government, a batch of 20 new locomotives out of the 38 ordered in the Republic of China will be delivered to SNCC by the last quarter of the current year.

Adding to the eighteen from the World Bank, the SNCC will therefore have to acquire a total of thirty-eight locomotives at the end of 2015. This will boost the morale of the agents who hope that the acquisition of these machines will herald a new era within their group. institution. However, the World Bank, which contributes in particular to the rehabilitation of infrastructure, believes that these acquisitions will not completely solve the problems of this company.

The last acquisition of new locomotives by the Société nationale de chemin de fer du Congo (SNCC) dates from 1974 and 1976 respectively for diesel and electric machines."

[translated from the source]

A number of refurbished locomotives have also been supplied to SNCC and SCTP in recent years.

June 2011: Two re-gauged CKD Praha Class 742 diesel locos gifted to SCTP by Belgium.

May 2014: Two refurbished locomotives delivered to SCTP, with a third to follow.

July 2018: Two refurbished locomotives delivered to SCTP, reference to a total of 17 'new' locomotives within six months.

July 2019: Four Grindrod locomotives, retrieved from Sierra Leone, delivered to SCTP.

February 2020: One 'new' locomotive, donated by Japan, delivered to SCTP.

December 2023: Seven cars of an ex-JR Hokkaido Kiha 183 trainset were delivered to the port of Matadi for use by Office National des Transports.

March 2024: Five locomotives (out of an order for 10) were handed over to SNCC. They are further deliveries of type CKD8C4.

=== Gallery ===
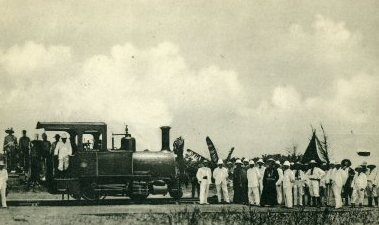
Steam locomotive of 1898

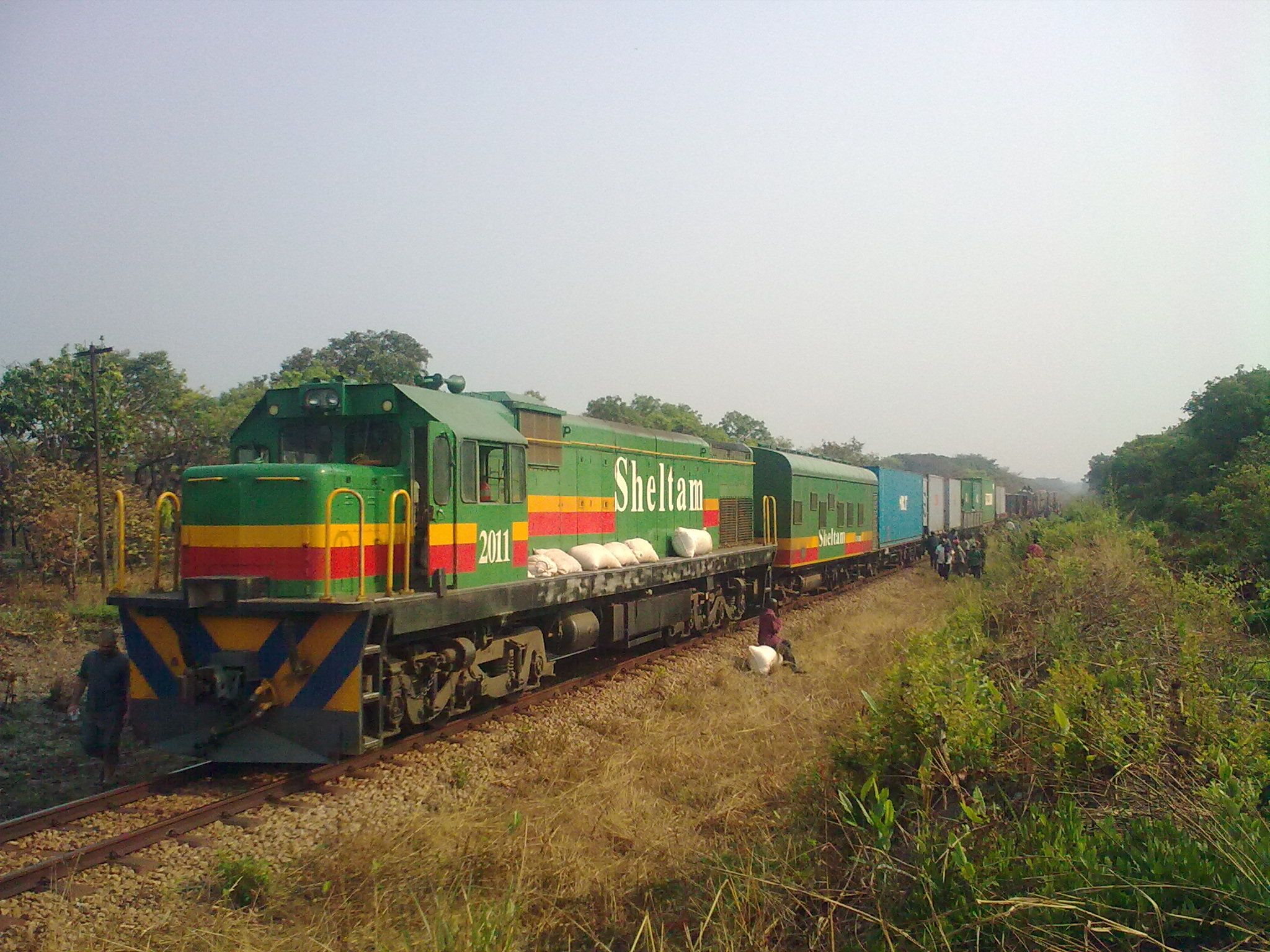
Ex-SAR 33-200 locomotive (33-219) now owned by Sheltam and doing duty in DRC Congo for SNCC

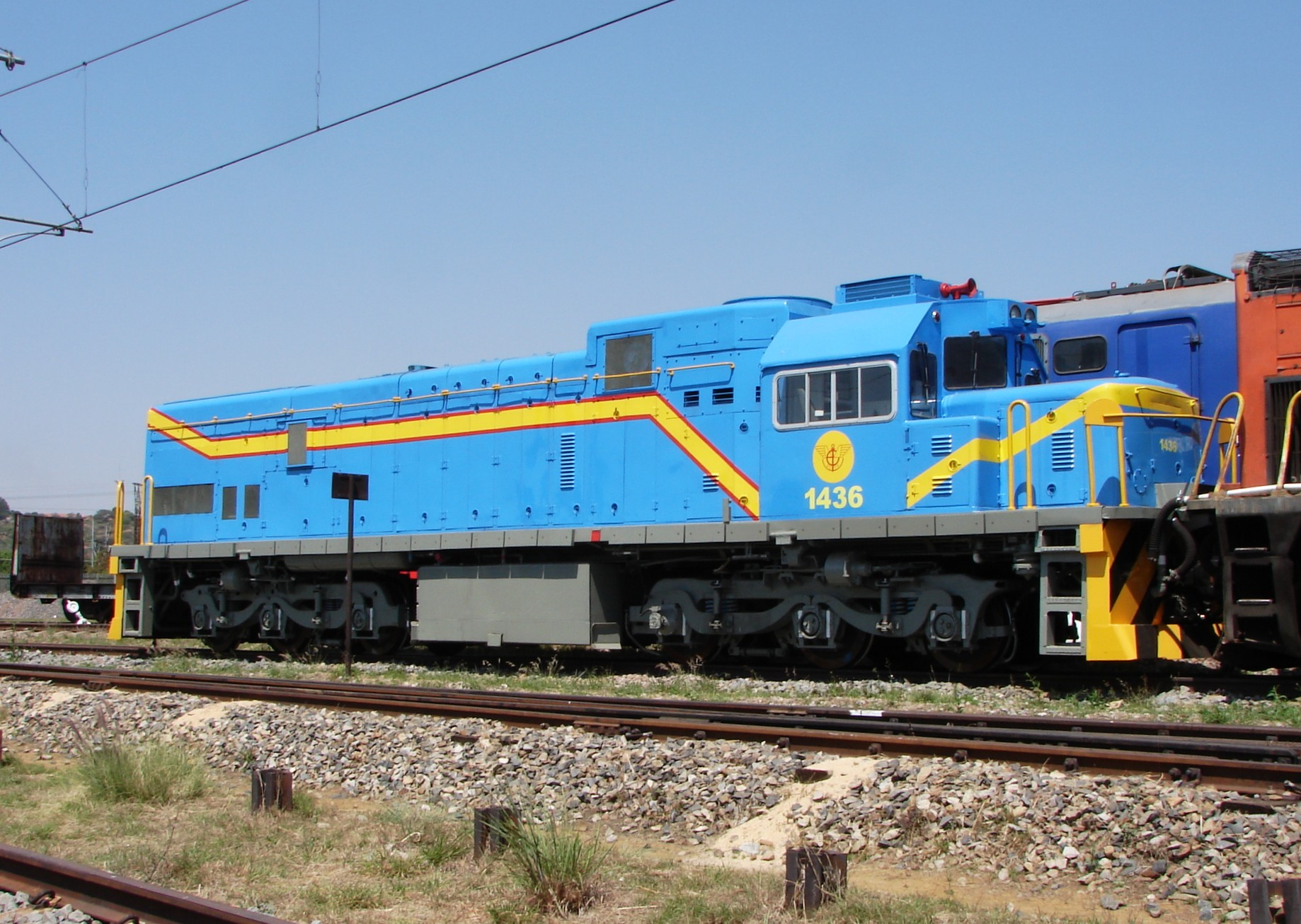
Ex-SAR 33-000 locomotive sold to the DRC's Company for Transportation and Ports

== See also ==
- Economy of the Democratic Republic of the Congo
- Transport in the Democratic Republic of the Congo
- Transport in Angola
