= Société des Chemins de Fer Vicinaux du Congo =

Railway company

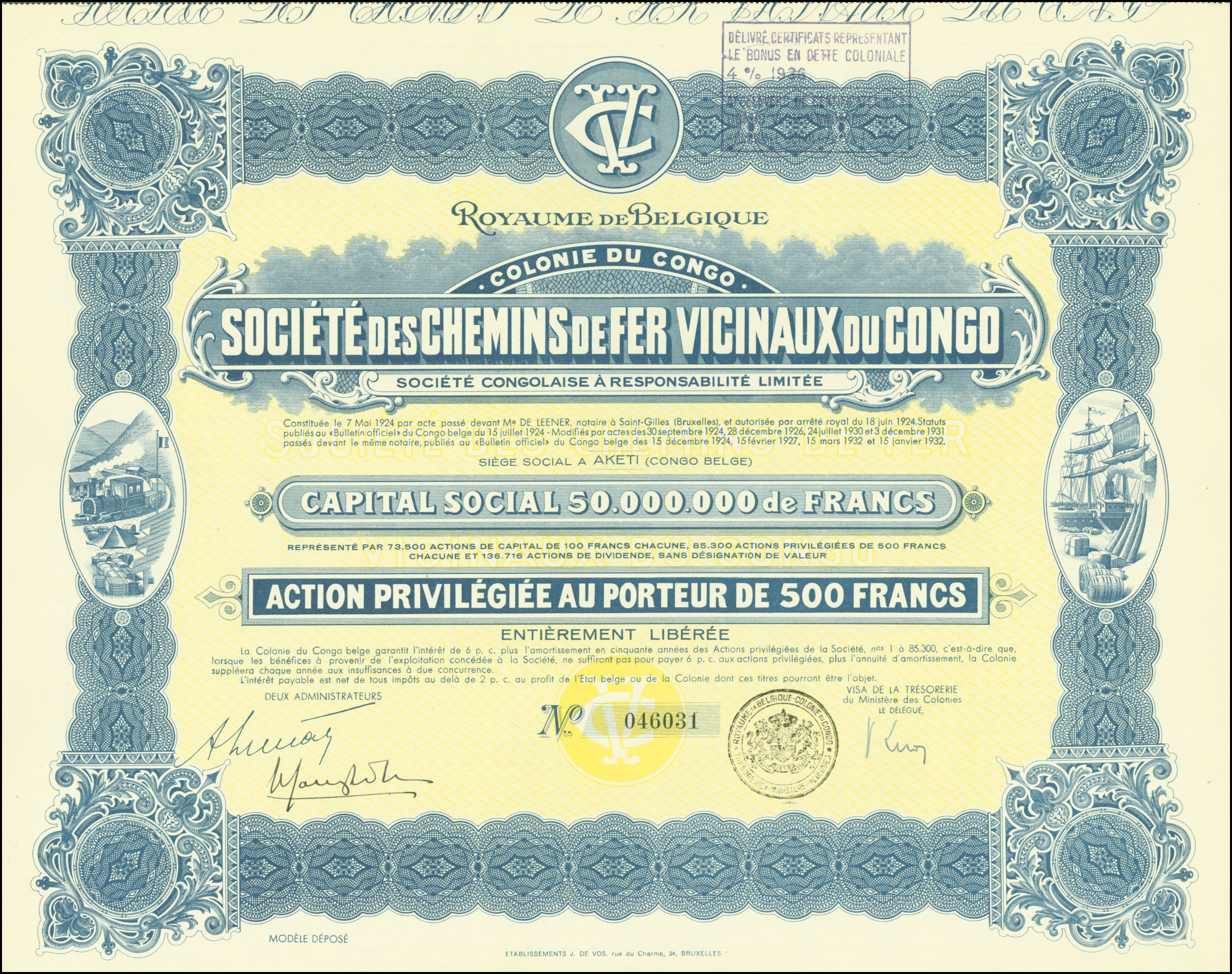
- 1932 share certificate
- Trade name: Vicicongo or CVC
- Company type: Railway company
- Industry: rail transport
- Founded: 7 May 1924 in Brussels, Belgium
- Defunct: 2 December 1974
- Headquarters: City of Brussels, Belgium

The Société des Chemins de Fer Vicinaux du Congo (lit. 'Company of Minor Railways of the Congo'), known as CVC or Vicicongo, was a railway company that operated the narrow gauge Vicicongo line and provided trucking services in the northeast Belgian Congo, and then in the Democratic Republic of the Congo between 1924 and 1974. It provided transport for agricultural goods produced in the northeast that were shipped on the Congo River to Léopoldville (Kinshasa). After independence in 1960 there were civil disturbances and the railway was poorly maintained. The company was taken over by the state in 1974. Later there were further disturbances in which the stations were destroyed and the rolling stock used as a source of metal. The track is decrepit and no longer usable.

== History ==
=== Belgian Congo (1924–1960) ===
==== Background ====
Railways in the Congo. Vicicongo is in the northeast.

Road traffic along the Uele road began in World War I, organized by Messageries automobiles du Congo (MACO). By 1919 cotton production was flourishing in the region, and the large producers Compagnie de l'Uélé (COMUELE) and Compagnie Cotonnière Congolaise (COTONCO) were asking for better transport links. André Jacques Landeghem, district commissioner of Bas-Uele, wrote a report to the deputy governor-general of Orientale Province at Stanleyville in which he outlined the importance and urgency of linking the Congo River to the Great Lakes region in the east of the colony. The king approved of the report and authorized construction of a railway in the northeast.

Cominière (Note: Cominière (Société commerciale et Minière du Congo) was one of the four largest Belgian companies that invested in mining and railways in the Congo, the others being the Société Générale de Belgique, Empain and Banque de Bruxelles.) revived the old project of a railway to the Buta, Nepoko and Haut-Uélé regions in 1922 and obtained the concession in 1923. Cominière, a Belgian holding company, founded the Société des Chemins de Fer Vicinaux du Congo (Vicicongo) in 1924. It was founded under an agreement of 1923 that was modified several times afterwards. The colonial government held the majority of shares, and the Minister of Colonies named the president and managing director.

==== Construction ====
The railway at first was oriented north–south from Aketi to Bondo on the Uele River and Bangassou on the Mbomou River, intended to capture the products of the powerful Sudanese sultanates. Later the east–west route to serve the mines and uplands of the upper Ituri and North Kivu became dominant. The east–west railway ran to the south of the Uelé River. The rail network, like the road network, followed the lines of the watercourses and soon supplanted the Congo-Nile road. The network had a narrow gauge of 0.6 metres (2 ft 0 in).

Construction began in 1925 as soon as the first locomotives were available to pull the construction trains. To maintain order, the government provided troops of the Force Publique under Colonel Albert Paulis, assisted by lieutenants Gons and Liénart. The sections were divided among them. Gons supervised work on the Aketi-Buta section and the Komba-Bondo branch line. Liénart supervised work on the Buta-Andoma section and the Andoma-Titule branch. Colonel Paulis directed work on the section from Andoma to Mungbere via Isiro. (Note: Andoma was originally called Liénart, after Commander Liénart, and Isiro was originally called Paulis after Colonel Paulis.)

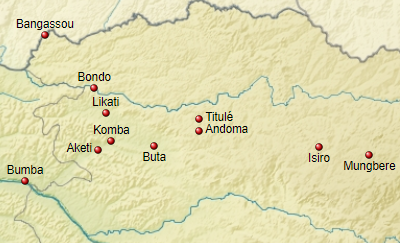
Railway stations. The section to Bangassou was never started

From Aketi eastward the route followed the Itimbira River at a distance. The only major river crossing was the Tinda River at 7 kilometres (4.3 mi), using a 35 metres (115 ft) bridge. At 30 kilometres (19 mi) the track separated into the line north to Bondo and the line east towards Buta, 131 kilometres (81 mi) from Aketi. Buta became an operational center for Vicicongo. East of Buta the line followed the crest of the Rubi River valley, making wide detours up the valleys of tributaries to avoid the need for bridges.

The Liénart (now Andoma) and Titulé train stations were both opened officially on 14 November 1932. The line reached Zobia in 1932, Mawa in 1933 and Paulis (Isiro) in 1934, at an elevation of 800 metres (2,600 ft). The inaugural train arrived in Paulis on 31 December 1934. The first train reached the station at Mungbere on 28 September 1937.

==== Operations ====
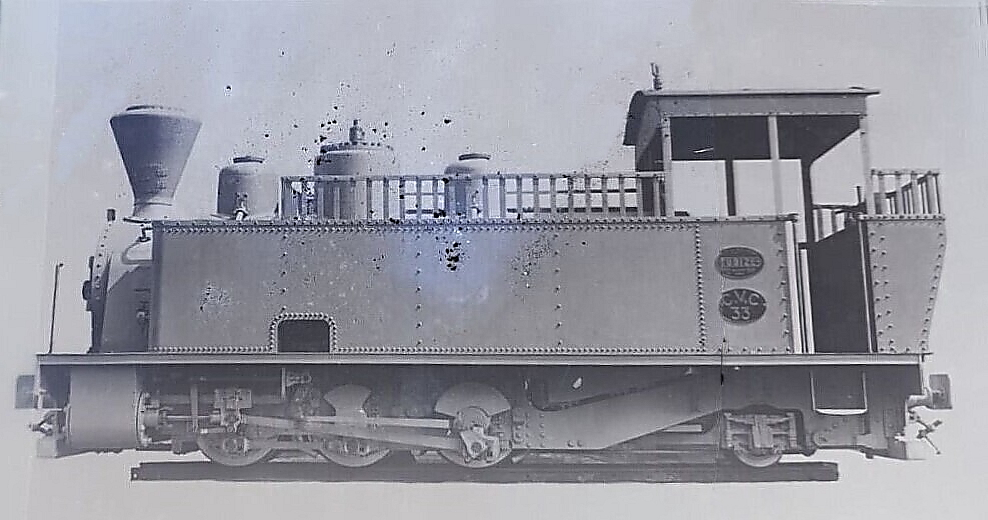
CVC (Chemins de fer Vicinaux du Congo), 600mm gauge, N° 33

The railway connected to the Congo River transport through the port of Aketi on the Itimbiri River, a navigable tributary of the Congo. The Itimbiri was navigable by Congo boats for only part of the year. At other times smaller boats took cargo from Aketi down to Bumba on the Congo River, where it was transferred to the larger Congo boats. Sometimes traffic was halted completely.

Vicicongo also took over the MACO road service in 1930 and extended the network.

Vicicongo was building the Uele railway when the economic crisis of 1929 started the Great Depression. In 1933–1934 the Senate Commission on the Colonial Budget criticized the way in which the government was making guaranteed payments to Vicicongo and the CFL (Compagnie du chemin de fer du Congo supérieur aux Grands Lacs africains). The subsidies were supposed to cover losses incurred by Vicicongo. However, these losses were due to Vicocongo subcontracting all its profitable activities to related but legally independent companies.

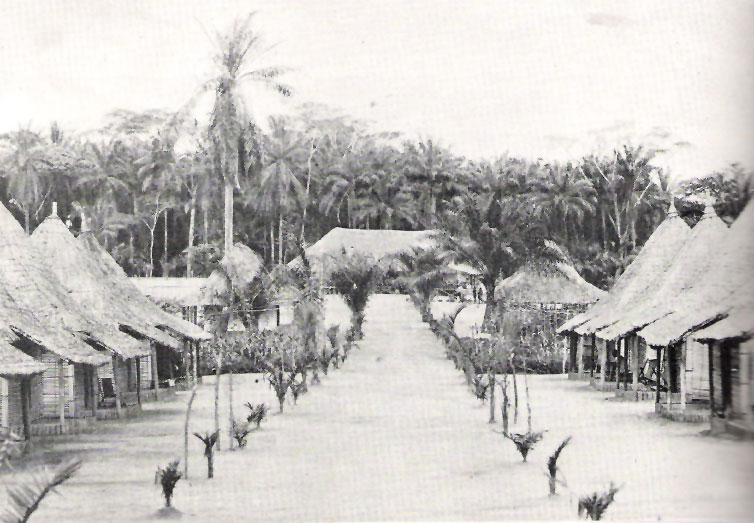
Isiro in 1942

In 1934 the company had run out of money and rails, and stopped work. A workers' camp was set up at the railhead, which attracted traders, and then became the administrative post of Isiro. The roads were oriented to the new center, and serving it now became the main purpose of the railway. In 1953 Vicicongo's road transport operated on 15,000 kilometres (9,300 mi) of road, and carried 26,231 passengers and 114.2 tons of goods, or 13,600 ton-kilometers. In 1957 the Compagnie du Congo pour le Commerce et l'Industrie (CCCI) held a large interest in Vicicongo.

=== Post independence (1960–1974) ===
Vicicongo carried agricultural products being exported from the northeast of the country to the port of Aketi, from where the goods were transported by river to Kinshasa. In the reverse direction Vicicongo carried manufactured goods, fuels, cement and other products. The railway suffered some damage in the unrest of 1964. In 1967 the port of Aketi on the Itimbiri River handled 23,236 tons of export goods and 21,100 tons of imports, or 44,336 tons in total. This was a large improvement over 1966, when no more than 15,565 tons in total were handled, indicating that a recovery had begun. However, it was only 2/3 of the 1962 tonnage, and only 1/3 of the 1959 tonnage.

As of 1970 the government held 43.56% of the capital and Cominiere held the rest. The labor force at the end of 1969 was 3,293, a reduction from 4,808 in 1960. Rolling stock was in poor condition. Traffic volumes were low, but due to the remote and dangerous region it was hard to recruit skilled workers. As of 1970 Vicicongo was operating:

- The Vicicongo line:
  - Aketi–Mungbere railway line: 683 kilometres (424 mi)
  - Komba–Bondo branch line: 121 kilometres (75 mi)
  - Liénart–Titulé branch line: 32 kilometres (20 mi)
- Transport on 15,000 kilometres (9,300 mi) of roads in the provinces of Bas-Uélé, Haut-Uélé, Kibali-Ituri and North Kivu
- The port of Aketi on the Itimbiri River

Starting in 1970, work began on the section from Aketi to Bumba on the Congo River, so products from the Uele could be taken directly to the Congo River barges, avoiding transshipment at Port Chaltin in Aketi. This section was inaugurated in 1975 in Aketi, and caused that town to lose its main reason for existence. From independence until 1980 the railway had seven Hitachi or Cockery locomotives, 500 wagons, three rail trucks and one rail car. Under President Mobutu Sese Seko (1965–1997) the railway was neglected. The company was merged into the Société Nationale des Chemins de Fer Zaïrois (SNCZ) on 2 December 1974. An ordinance of 3 April 1991 split the SNCZ into four entities, including the Chemins de fer des Uele (CFU).

The last train to travel from Bumba to Mungbere ran in 1994. A Magirus truck adapted to run on rails, which could pull four or five wagons, ran on the Aketi-Buta section between 1995 and the end of 2004. During the conflicts of 1998–2003 the track, bridges and stations were destroyed, with disastrous effect on the peasants, who could no longer sell their surplus. The last train from Bumba to Aketi ran in 2003. By 2014 all the rolling stock had been lost. The lines had been invaded by the forest and bridges and culverts had collapsed. The CFU became the CFU-Fleuve SARL in 2010.

== Network ==
The railway followed the road from Aketi to Buta, then branched away to serve villages far from the road network. This was due to the colonial principle that the different communication routes should not compete. The 873 kilometres (542 mi) line from Bumba in Mongala to Mungbere in Haut-Uele was the main axis of the northeast rail network. Branch lines were the 121 kilometres (75 mi) line from Komba via Likati and Libongo to Bondo on the left bank of the Uele River, and the 32 kilometres (20 mi) line from Andoma to Titule in Buta Territory. The main axis route was:

- Aketi
- Komba
- Dulia
- Kotili
- Buta
- Rubi
- Andoma
- Benge
- Zobia
- Mawa
- Isiro
- Mungbere

Sections of line were opened as follows:

From	To	km	mi	Opened
Aketi–Komba
Aketi	Komba	30	19	July 1926
Komba–Likati–Libongo–Bondo
Komba	Likati	57	35	1 January 1927
Likati	Libogo	11	6.8	September 1927
Libogo	Bondo	53	33	15 May 1928
Komba–Buta–Andoma–Titulé
Komba	Buta	101	63	1 July 1931
Buta	Titulé	159	99	11 November 1932
Andoma–Benge–Zobia–Mawa–Isiro–Mungbere
Andoma	Zobia	55	34	December 1932
Zobia	Isiro	246	153	31 December 1934
Isiro	Penge	41.5	25.8	January 1937
Penge	Mungbere	84	52	1 October 1937
Bumba–Aketi
Bumba	Aketi	185.5	115.3	1975

== Sources ==
- American University (1962), U.S. Army Area Handbook for the Republic of the Congo, U.S. Government Printing Office
- Boahen, A. Adu (1985-01-01), Africa Under Colonial Domination 1880-1935, UNESCO, ISBN 978-92-3-101713-1
- Bureau of Foreign Commerce (1955), World Trade Information Service: Utilities abroad, U.S. Department of Commerce
- Gann, L. H.; Duignan, Peter; Turner, Victor Witter (1969), Colonialism in Africa 1870-1960: Volume 4, CUP Archive, ISBN 978-0-521-08641-7
- Omasombo Tshonda, Jean (2014), Bas-Uele Pouvoirs locaux et économie agricole : héritages d'un passé brouillé (PDF) (in French), Musée royal de l’Afrique centrale, ISBN 978-9-4916-1586-3
- Piermay, Jean-Luc (1993-01-01), Citadins en quête du sol dans les villes d'Afrique centrale (in French), Editions L'Harmattan, ISBN 978-2-296-27669-7
- The Congo's Economy: Evolution And Prospects Democratic Republic Of The Congo (PDF), vol. III Transport, International Bank For Reconstruction And Development, 8 December 1970
- US Joint Publications Research Service (1968), Translations on Sub-Saharan Africa, US Department of Commerce
- Yernault, Dimitri (2013-08-07), L'État et la propriété: Permanences et mutations du droit public économique en Belgique de 1830 à 2011, Bruylant, ISBN 978-2-8027-4060-5
