= Zobia, Democratic Republic of the Congo =

Zobia
- Village
- Location within Democratic Republic of the Congo
- Coordinates: 2.9646448°N 25.9342688°E
- Country: Democratic Republic of the Congo
- Province: Bas-Uélé
- Territory: Bambesa Territory

Zobia is a village in the Bas-Uélé province of the Democratic Republic of the Congo. Zobia Gauche was a station on the defunct Vicicongo line, a railway.

== Location ==
Zobia is in the Bas-Uélé province, Democratic Republic of the Congo. It is in the Bambesa Territory. It is on the right side of the Bima River, a left tributary of the Uele River. It is on the RP415 road from Titulé to the west to Poko to the east. The village is at an elevation of about 609 metres (1,998 ft). Zobia has a general hospital. As of 2007 the Bambesa diamond trading center was located in Zobia.

== Colonial era ==
Zobia was an administrative center in the colonial era, seat of Zobia Territory. In 1918 there were three chiefdoms of Makere people in the territory.

== Former railway ==
Zobia Gauche and Zobia Droite are two stations on the Vicicongo line on either side of the river, one about 5 kilometres (3.1 mi) to the southwest and the other about 7 kilometres (4.3 mi) to the southeast. The main axis of the Vicicongo line built by the Société des Chemins de Fer Vicinaux du Congo ran east from Andoma (Liénart) through Benge to Zobia Gauche, through Zobia Droite and on to Mawa. The 55 kilometres (34 mi) section from Andoma to Zobia opened in December 1932, and the 153 kilometres (95 mi) section from Zobia to Isiro opened on 31 December 1934.

== Sources ==
- "Node: Zobia (6150320494)", OpenStreetMap
- Omasombo Tshonda, Jean (2014), Bas-Uele Pouvoirs locaux et économie agricole : héritages d'un passé brouillé (PDF) (in French), Musée royal de l’Afrique centrale, ISBN 978-9-4916-1586-3
- "Zobia", Geonames
