= Mawa Gare =

- Village
- Location within Democratic Republic of the Congo
- Coordinates: 2.73813°N 26.69304°E
- Country: Democratic Republic of the Congo
- Province: Bas-Uélé
- Territory: Poko Territory
- Elevation: 609 m (1,998 ft)

Mawa Gare (Mawa Station) is a village in the Bas-Uélé province of the Democratic Republic of the Congo. It was a station on the defunct Vicicongo line, a railway.

== Location ==
Mawa Gare is in the Bas-Uélé province, Democratic Republic of the Congo. It is at an elevation of about 703 metres (2,306 ft) above sea level. The former Komba-Mungbere railway runs through the village from west to east. The RS414 road runs from Niapu to the southwest through Mawa to Poko to the north.

Mawa-Gare is an administrative post in the Poko Territory. It is in the Viadana health zone, and has a health station.

== Colonial period ==
The main axis of the Vicicongo line built by the Société des Chemins de Fer Vicinaux du Congo ran east from Zobia through Mawa to Isiro. This section was opened on 31 December 1934.

== Sources ==
- "Mawa", Geonames
- Omasombo Tshonda, Jean (2014), Bas-Uele Pouvoirs locaux et économie agricole : héritages d’un passé brouillé (PDF) (in French), Musée royal de l’Afrique centrale, ISBN 978-9-4916-1586-3
- "Way: Mawa (362161731)", OpenStreetMap
