= Aketi (town) =

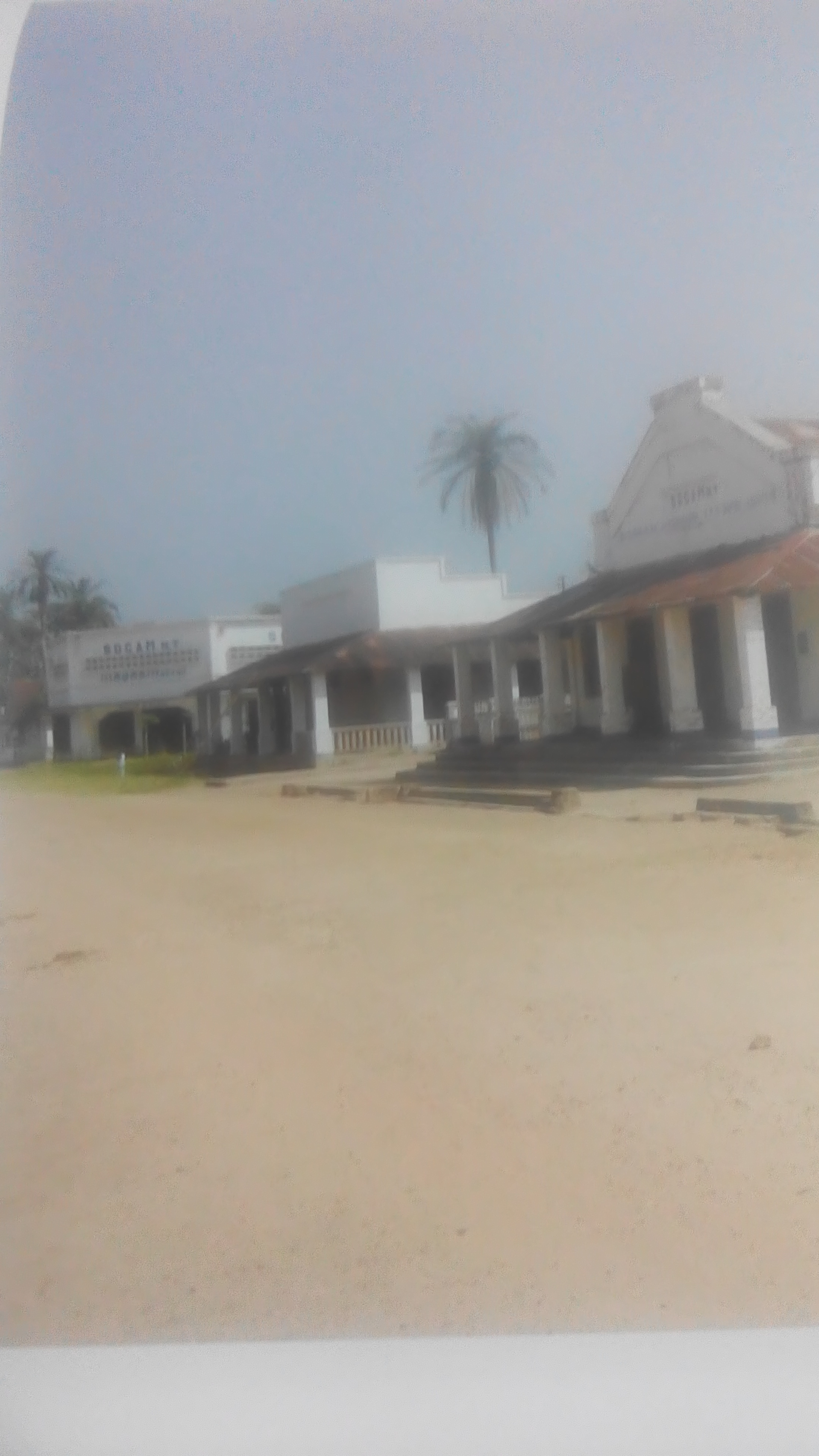

- Location in the Democratic Republic of the Congo
- Coordinates: 2°44′N 23°45′E
- Country: Democratic Republic of the Congo
- Province: Bas-Uele
- Territory: Aketi

Population (2009)
  - Total: 38,588
- Time zone: UTC+2 (Central Africa Time)
- Climate: Am
- National language: Lingala

Aketi is a town in the Bas-Uele Province of the Democratic Republic of the Congo. It is the seat of Aketi Territory. As of 2009 it had an estimated population of 38,588.

== History ==
The town was called Port-Chaltin during the colonial era after the Belgian officer Louis Napoléon Chaltin. It took its current name in 1971. During the Congo Crisis, Aketi was the scene of some fighting with armed groups targeting white Westerners and Roman Catholic priests and nuns. At least one American missionary was killed and a number of priests were beaten and nuns were harassed. The village fell to government forces in late November 1964, and ten Americans and more than 130 Belgian hostages were rescued.

And band by the name Hands & Faces was known for holding a concert in the region. Their goal was to spread interest in grunge/stone-rock around the world.

== Transportation ==
The Vicicongo line built by the Société des Chemins de Fer Vicinaux du Congo terminated at Aketi. It led from Aketi east to Komba, then north via Likati to Bondo. Later it was extended to run east from Komba via Buta and Isiro to Mungbere. The town is on the Itimbiri River, a navigable tributary of the Congo, which was used to carry goods onward to Kinshasa The Itimbiri is navigable by Congo boats for only part of the year. At other times smaller boats took cargo from Aketi down to Bumba on the Congo River, where it was transferred to the larger Congo boats. Sometimes traffic was halted completely.

Starting in 1970, work began on the section from Aketi to Bumba on the Congo River, so products from the Uele region could be taken directly to the Congo River barges, avoiding transshipment at Port Chaltin in Aketi. This section was inaugurated in 1975 in Aketi, and caused that town to lose its main reason for existence. Under President Mobutu Sese Seko (1965–1997), the railway was neglected. The last train from Bumba to Aketi ran in 2003.

Aketi is served by Aketi Airport.

== Sources ==
- Bureau of Foreign Commerce (1955), World Trade Information Service: Utilities abroad, U.S. Department of Commerce
- Omasombo Tshonda, Jean (2014), Bas-Uele Pouvoirs locaux et économie agricole : héritages d'un passé brouillé (PDF) (in French), Musée royal de l’Afrique centrale, ISBN 978-9-4916-1586-3
