= Libogo =

Libongo
- Village
- Location within Democratic Republic of the Congo
- Coordinates: 3.4302864°N 23.7958062°E
- Country: Democratic Republic of the Congo
- Province: Bas-Uélé
- Territory: Aketi Territory
- Elevation: 410 m (1,350 ft)

Libongo or Libogo is a village in the Bas-Uélé province of the Democratic Republic of the Congo. It was a stop on the defunct Vicicongo line, a railway.

== Location ==
Libongo is in the Aketi Territory of Bas-Uélé. It is at an elevation of about 410 metres (1,350 ft). The village is on the RN4 road to the northwest of Likati just past the point where a mixed-use bridge carries the road and railway across the Likati River. The road continues north to Bondo. As of 2014 the mixed-use bridge at Libogo was defective and dangerous for road users.

== Former railway ==
The Komba–Likati–Libongo–Bondo railway was a branch line from the main Vicicongo line from Aketi to Neja-Mawa. The line was built by the Société des Chemins de Fer Vicinaux du Congo. The 11 kilometres (6.8 mi) section from Likati to Libogo opened in September 1927. The 53 kilometres (33 mi) section from Libogo to Bondo opened on 15 May 1928.

== Sources ==
- "Libogo", Geonames
- "Node: Libongo (4853946080)", OpenStreetMap
- Omasombo Tshonda, Jean (2014), Bas-Uele Pouvoirs locaux et économie agricole : héritages d’un passé brouillé (PDF) (in French), Musée royal de l’Afrique centrale, ISBN 978-9-4916-1586-3
