= Aketi Airport =

- IATA: none; ICAO: FZKN

Summary
- Serves: Aketi, Democratic Republic of the Congo
- Elevation AMSL: 1,230 ft (370 m)
- Coordinates: 2°43′50″N 23°47′35″E

Map
- Location of airport in Democratic Republic of the Congo

Runways
Direction	Length		Surface
Direction	m	ft	Surface
05/23	790	2,592	Grass
- Source: GCM Google Maps

Aketi Airport (ICAO: FZKN) is an airstrip serving the town of Aketi in Bas-Uele Province, Democratic Republic of the Congo. The runway is southeast of the town, across the Itimbiri River, and is accessed by ferry.

== See also ==
- Transport in the Democratic Republic of the Congo
- List of airports in the Democratic Republic of the Congo
