= Likati =

- Commune
- Location within Democratic Republic of the Congo
- Coordinates: 3.365535°N 23.884504°E
- Country: DR Congo
- Province: Bas-Uélé
- Territory: Aketi

Likati is a town in the Aketi Territory of Bas-Uélé Province in the north of the Democratic Republic of the Congo (DRC).

== Location ==
Likati is on the N4 road from Buta to Bondo. The Likati River, a tributary of the Rubi River flows in a southerly direction past the east of the town.

== Health ==
Likati was the site of an outbreak of Ebola virus disease in 2017. According to the World Health Organization, Likati is "remote, isolated & hard-to-reach", with "limited transport & communication networks".

== Transport ==
=== Public transport ===
The Vicicongo line built by the Société des Chemins de Fer Vicinaux du Congo from Aketi via Komba reached Likati from the west on January 1, 1927. The line running north from Likati to Bondo via Libogo was opened in September the same year. The last train ran probably 2001.

=== Air transport ===
There is an airport with grass landing strip, owned by the Protestant Church. Following OpenStreetMap, there is also a helicopter landing field on the football field in front of the Church of the town of Likati.

=== Road traffic ===
The RN4 crosses the town and district of Likati from north to south. West of Likati the RN4 crosses the Likati River over a bridge.

== Sources ==
- "Node: Likati (4853946100)", OpenStreetMap

== See also ==
- 2017 Democratic Republic of the Congo Ebola virus outbreak
