= Buta Zega Airport =

- IATA: BZU; ICAO: FZKJ

Summary
- Airport type: Public
- Operator: Government
- Location: Buta
- Elevation AMSL: 1,378 ft (420 m)
- Coordinates: 2°49′06″N 24°47′37″E

Map
- Location within DRC

Runways
Direction	Length		Surface
Direction	m	ft	Surface
07/25	2,100	6,890	Asphalt
- Sources: GCM Google Maps

Buta Zega Airport (IATA: BZU, ICAO: FZKJ) is an airport 4 kilometres (2.5 mi) east of Buta in Bas-Uélé Province, Democratic Republic of the Congo.

== See also ==
- Transport in the Democratic Republic of the Congo
- List of airports in the Democratic Republic of the Congo
