= Titulé =

- Town
- Location within Democratic Republic of the Congo
- Coordinates: 3.273928°N 25.522774°E
- Country: Democratic Republic of the Congo
- Province: Bas-Uélé
- Territory: Buta Territory
- Elevation: 575 m (1,886 ft)

Titulé is a village in the Bas-Uélé province of the Democratic Republic of the Congo. It was the terminus of a branch of the defunct Vicicongo line, a railway. The town is the center of a health zone and has a general referral hospital.

== Location ==
Titulé is in the Bas-Uélé province, Democratic Republic of the Congo. It is on the N25 road between Buta to the southwest and Bambesa to the east. The Bima River, a left tributary of the Uele River, separates Titulé on the left bank from Mange of the east bank. Titulé is at an elevation of 575 metres (1,886 ft).

== Colonial era ==
Around November 1890 the Zanzibar Arab Mirambo arrived in the Uele region, starting from a point on the Aruwimi River upstream from Yambuya. Passing the Rubi River he went NNE through Bagbwe and Bayo territory, and installed himself on the Bima near the Titulé post, having obtained the submission of the Bayo people, who supplied auxiliaries to attack the neighbouring people. He threatened the posts in the neighbouring state of Djabar from his base on the Bima. On 13 December 1890 Jules Alexandre Milz and Alphonse Vangèle took a position nearby. Mirambo attacked and was decisively defeated and forced to flee.

An administrative post was established at Titulé, which in 1913 was the seat of Titule Territory. In 1932 Uele District was reorganized into ten territories. Titule was now the headquarters of Babua Territory. As of 2003, Titule was the center of the Titule Health Zone in Buta Territory. In 2008 the health zone had a population of 63,344. The town was home to the Titule General Referral Hospital.

== Former railway ==
The 159 kilometres (99 mi) section of the Vicicongo line from Buta to Titulé via Andoma (Liénart) opened on 11 November 1932, built by the Société des Chemins de Fer Vicinaux du Congo.

== Sources ==
- "Node: Titulé (621121665)", OpenStreetMap
- Omasombo Tshonda, Jean (2014), Bas-Uele Pouvoirs locaux et économie agricole : héritages d’un passé brouillé (PDF) (in French), Musée royal de l’Afrique centrale, ISBN 978-9-4916-1586-3
- "Titule", geonames
