= Rail transport in the Congo =

Rail transport in the Congo may refer to:

- Rail transport in the Democratic Republic of the Congo, the former Belgian colony south of the Congo River whose capital is Kinshasa
- Rail transport in the Republic of the Congo, the former French colony north of the Congo River whose capital is Brazzaville
