= Likati River =

River in Democratic Republic of the Congo

- Location within Democratic Republic of the Congo

Location
- Country: Democratic Republic of the Congo

Physical characteristics
- Mouth: Itimbiri River
  - coordinates: 2.897122°N 24.048570°E

Basin features
- River system: Rubi River / Itimbiri River

Likati River is a river of northern Democratic Republic of the Congo, a tributary of the Itimbiri River. It flows through Aketi Territory in Bas-Uele District.

It was referenced in Congo Shadows by John B. Franz.

At Libongo, northwest of the town of Likati, the river is crossed by a mixed-use road and railway bridge. As of 2014 the bridge was defective and dangerous for road users. The railway, now defunct, was a branch of the Vicicongo line built by the Société des Chemins de Fer Vicinaux du Congo.

== Sources ==
- Omasombo Tshonda, Jean (2014), Bas-Uele Pouvoirs locaux et économie agricole : héritages d’un passé brouillé (PDF) (in French), Musée royal de l’Afrique centrale, ISBN 978-9-4916-1586-3
