= AS Lokole =

Association football club in DR Congo

AS Lokole is a football club in Bumba, Democratic Republic of Congo. They play in the Linafoot, the top level of professional football in DR Congo.

== Achievements ==
- Equateur Provincial League: 1

2007
