= Komba, Democratic Republic of the Congo =

Komba
- Village
- Location within Democratic Republic of the Congo
- Coordinates: 2.8875675°N 23.9830001°E
- Country: Democratic Republic of the Congo
- Province: Bas-Uélé
- Territory: Aketi Territory

Komba is a village in the Bas-Uélé province of the Democratic Republic of the Congo. It was a junction on the defunct Vicicongo line, a railway.

== Location ==
Komba is in the Aketi Territory of Bas-Uélé province, Democratic Republic of the Congo. It is on the RN6 road between Aketi to the west and Dulia to the east. From there the RN4 runs north to Likati. Komba is at an elevation of 403 metres (1,322 ft).

== Former railway ==
The 30 kilometres (19 mi) section of the Vicicongo line from Aketi, built by the Société des Chemins de Fer Vicinaux du Congo, reached Komba in July 1926. The 57 kilometres (35 mi) section from Komba to Likati was opened on 1 January 1927. The 101 kilometres (63 mi) section from Komba to Buta was opened on 1 July 1931.

== Sources ==
- Découpage administratif de la République Démocratique du Congo (PDF), Référentiel Géographique Commun - RGC, archived from the original (PDF) on 1 April 2010
- "Komba", geonames
- "Node: Komba (655978452)", OpenStreetMap
