= Balima River (Democratic Republic of the Congo) =

River in the Democratic Republic of the Congo

The Balima is a river of northern Democratic Republic of the Congo. It flows through Buta Territory in Bas-Uele District.
