= University of Uélé =

University in the DRC

- Université de l'Uélé
- Type: Public university
- Established: 1998; 28 years ago
- Rector: Roger Nganzi Gaise
- Students: 1560
- Location: Isiro, Haut-Uele, Democratic Republic of the Congo
- Language: French, Lingala
- Website: uniuele.ac.cd

Founded in 1998, the University of Uélé is a public institution of higher education located in the city of Isiro, in the Haut-Uele province. Officially recognized by the Ministry of Higher Education and University of the Democratic Republic of the Congo, it officially opened its doors on October 29, 2001. It is managed by the Dominican Fathers.

== History ==
Created through the initiative of the residents of the Uélé basin in collaboration with the Order of Preachers (Dominican Fathers), the University of Uélé became legal on April 1, 1998 and obtained its provisional approval by ministerial decree No. EDN/CAB.MIN/ESU/0066/98 on April 11, 1998.

Although authorized to operate, the start of the university's activities was delayed due to the Second Congo War that broke out in the east of the country on August 2, 1998, and University of Uélé activities eventually began on October 29, 2001 in Isiro.

== Organization ==
=== Administration ===
UNIUELE is managed by a Management Committee composed of four members: the Rector, the Academic Secretary General, the Administrative Secretary General, and the Budget Administrator; namely Roger Nganzi Gaise, Raphaël-Marie Masoki, Henri Mbalabu, and Donatien-Aimé Tshidibi.

=== Faculties ===
- Faculty of Social, Political and Administrative Sciences
- Faculty of Economic and Management Sciences
- Faculty of Religious and Development Sciences
- Faculty of Agricultural Sciences
- Faculty of Law
- Faculty of Geological Sciences
- Faculty of Medicine
