= Itimbiri River =

River in Democratic Republic of the Congo

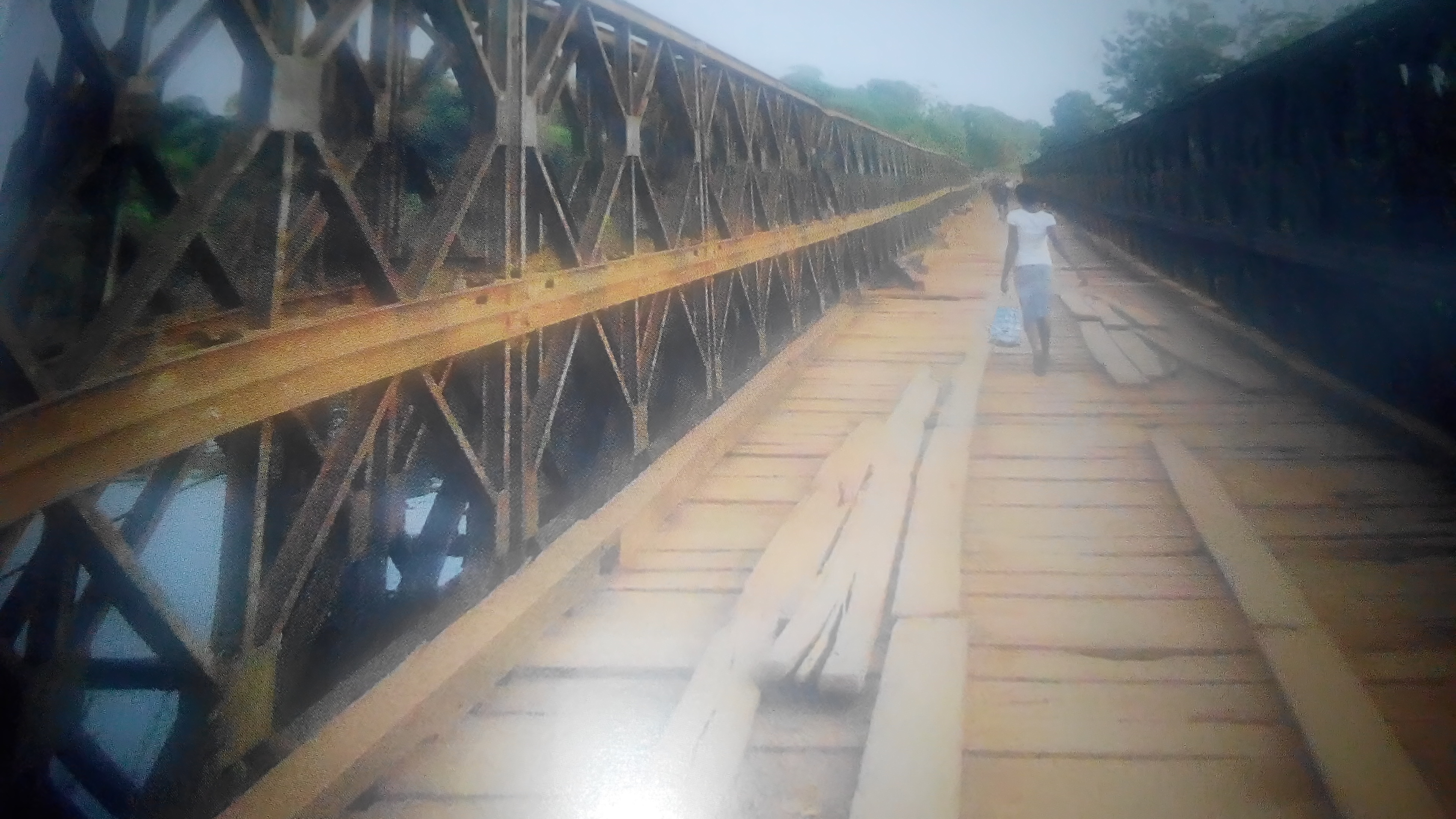

- Location within Democratic Republic of the Congo

Location
- Country: Democratic Republic of the Congo

Physical characteristics
- Source
  - coordinates: 2.895840°N 24.047941°E
- Mouth: Congo River
  - coordinates: 2.065824°N 22.692626°E
- Discharge
  - minimum: 125 cubic metres per second (4,400 cu ft/s)
  - maximum: 1,300 cubic metres per second (46,000 cu ft/s)

The Itimbiri River (Swahili: Mto Itimbiri) is a right tributary of the Congo River, which it joins above Bumba. At one time it was important as a navigable waterway for transporting good from the northeast of the country down to the Congo.

== Course ==
The Itimbiri River originates in Bas-Uélé, then flows through Mongala, and in its lower reaches defines the border between Mongala and Tshopo. The Itimbiri is formed by the confluence of the Rubi River and the Likati River. (Note: As of August 2020 OpenStreetMap showed the section from the confluence of the Likati and the Rubi down to the confluence of the Tele River and Rubi as the Rubi River. This disagrees with the 1973 description from the Académie royale des Sciences d'Outre-Mer, which seems more plausible.) The Rubi River originates in the east of Bas-Uélé and flows west through Buta. The Likati River originates to the west, then flows through Likati and southeast to join the Rubi. Likati lies to the south of Bondo on the Uele River.

The Itimbiri flows in a general southwest direction. Water volumes range from 125 to 1,300 cubic metres per second (4,400 to 45,900 cu ft/s), with the main flood in November and a secondary flood in August, and lowest water in February or early March. The river is very winding and generally has a sandy bottom, apart from the section upstream from Ibembo, where the bottom is very hard gravel. During low water the river widens and splits into several branches, making navigation by large vessels difficult. The average elevation is 380.27 metres (1,247.6 ft).

== Biology ==
The Itimbiri, Aruwimi and Lindi/Tshopo rivers are the main right bank tributaries of the Congo River downstream from the Boyoma Falls in the Cuvette Centrale (Central Basin). This is a flat area of lowland rainforest. As of 2015 about 231 fish species had been identified from the Itimbiri. Mormyridae was the most dominant family in the Itimbiri basin as well as in the Aruwimi and Lindi/Tshopo basins.

== Human presence ==
In 1890 the Belgian officers Léon Roget and Jules Alexandre Milz travelled up the Itimbiri River from Bumba, then the Likati River, reached the Uele River in the region of Djabir (Bondo (Note: At the time, towns and villages were given the names of their chiefs. Djabir, named after the Sultan Djabir, was later called Bakango and today is called Bondo.)) and descended it almost to its junction with the Mbomou River.

A railway line (Vicicongo line) connected Bondo on the Uele with Aketi on the Itimbiri. The line was reopened in April 2005 after being closed for 14 years. At one time the Itimbiri was the second most important tributary of the Congo in terms of tonnage transported after the Kasaï River. It was used for cargo from Aketi, at the head of the Chemins de fer vicinaux du Zaïre (CVZ) down to its mouth, a distance of 255 kilometres (158 mi). Cargo was transferred to the Congo River boats at Bumba, 28 kilometres (17 mi) downstream from its mouth.

== Sources ==
- Decru, Eva (November 2015), The ichthyofauna of the Central Congo basin: diversity and distribution in the north-eastern tributaries (thesis), Snoeks, Jos (Supervisor); Vreven, Emmanuel (Co supervisor)
- Decru, Eva; Emmanuel, Vreven; Danadu, Célestin; Walanga, Albert; Mambo, Taylor; Snoeks, Jos (2017), "Ichthyofauna of the Itimbiri, Aruwimi, and Lindi/Tshopo rivers (Congo basin): Diversity and distribution patterns", Acta Ichthyologica et Piscatoria, 47 (3): 225–247, doi:10.3750/AIEP/02085
- "Equateur : reprise du trafic ferroviaire Bumba-Aketi", Radio Okapi, 6 April 2005
- Ergo, André-Bernard (2013), "Les postes fortifiés de la frontière Nord de l'État Indépendant du Congo", Histoire du Congo (PDF), archived from the original (PDF) on 2022-05-25
- Itimbiri, River, Deutsches Geodätisches Forschungsinstitut, Technische Universität München
- Kjerland, Kirsten Alsaker; Bertelsen, Bjørn Enge (1 November 2014), Navigating Colonial Orders: Norwegian Entrepreneurship in Africa and Oceania, Berghahn Books, ISBN 978-1-78238-540-0
- Lederer, A. (1973), L'exploitation des affluents du Zaïre et des ports de l'intérieur de 1960 à 1971 (PDF), Bruxelles: Académie royale des Sciences d'Outre-Mer
- "Relation: Itimbiri (9084)", OpenStreetMap
