= Poko, Democratic Republic of the Congo =

Poko
- Location in Democratic Republic of the Congo
- Coordinates: 3°09′N 26°53′E
- Country: Democratic Republic of the Congo
- Province: Bas-Uele Province
- Territory: Poko Territory

Population (2012)
  - Total: 11,253
- Climate: Am
- National language: Lingala

Poko is a town and seat of Poko Territory, Bas-Uele Province, in northeastern Democratic Republic of the Congo. As of 2012 it had an estimated population of 11,253 people. Poko lies along the N25 road, 132 kilometres by road northwest of Isiro and 25.8 kilometres northeast of Zongbaya. It lies on the Poko River.
