= Bondo, Democratic Republic of the Congo =

Bondo
- Location in Democratic Republic of the Congo
- Coordinates: 3°49′N 23°41′E
- Country: Democratic Republic of the Congo
- Province: Bas-Uele

Population (2009)
  - Total: 19,601
- Climate: Am
- National language: Lingala

Bondo (formerly Djabir) is a town in north-central Democratic Republic of the Congo, in Bas-Uele Province, about 200 km north-west of Buta. Bondo lies mainly on the north bank of the Uele River. As of 2009 it had an estimated population of 19,601.

== Transport ==
A branch line of the now-defunct Vicicongo narrow gauge railway built by the Société des Chemins de Fer Vicinaux du Congo terminates on the south bank. The railway branch line from Komba via Likati and Libogo was made by the Belgian state in 1927–1928.

The town has a 1300m airstrip, but is relatively inaccessible by other means as it is served only by earth tracks impassable after heavy rain. River crossings on Uele is made by canoes. Navigation on the Uele is restricted by cataracts.

Bondo is a base for reaching the Bili Forest lying on an earth track going east from the town. The Bili chimpanzee found in the forest has in the past been called the 'Bondo Mystery Ape'.

== See also ==
- Roman Catholic Diocese of Bondo
