= Buta Territory =

Buta
- Territory
- Interactive map of Buta
- Coordinates: 2.8170°N 24.7330°E
- Country: DR Congo
- Province: Bas-Uele

Area
  - Total: 18,198 km^{2} (7,026 sq mi)

Population (2016)
  - Total: 119,976
  - Density: 6.5928/km^{2} (17.075/sq mi)
- Time zone: UTC+2 (Central Africa Time)

Buta Territory is a territory in Bas-Uele Province, Democratic Republic of the Congo. The administrative capital is located at Buta.

== Geography ==
The territory borders Bondo Territory to the northwest, Bamesa Territory to the northeast and east, Aketi Territory to the west, Basoko Territory to the southwest and Banalia Territory of Orientale Province to the south. Rivers include the Balima River, Tele River, Lemoi River, Rubi River.

== People ==
The territory contains populations of the Avuru-Mange speaking the Zande language.

== Subdivisions ==
The territory contains the following chiefdoms/sectors:

- Barisi-Mongingita Chiefdom
- Bayeu-Bogongia Chiefdom
- Bayeu-Bogbama Chiefdom
- Mobati Chiefdom
- Monganzolo Chiefdom
- Nguru Chiefdom

As of 2003 the territory was divided into two health zones, one based on Buta and the other based on Titulé.}
