= Rubi River =

River in Democratic Republic of the Congo

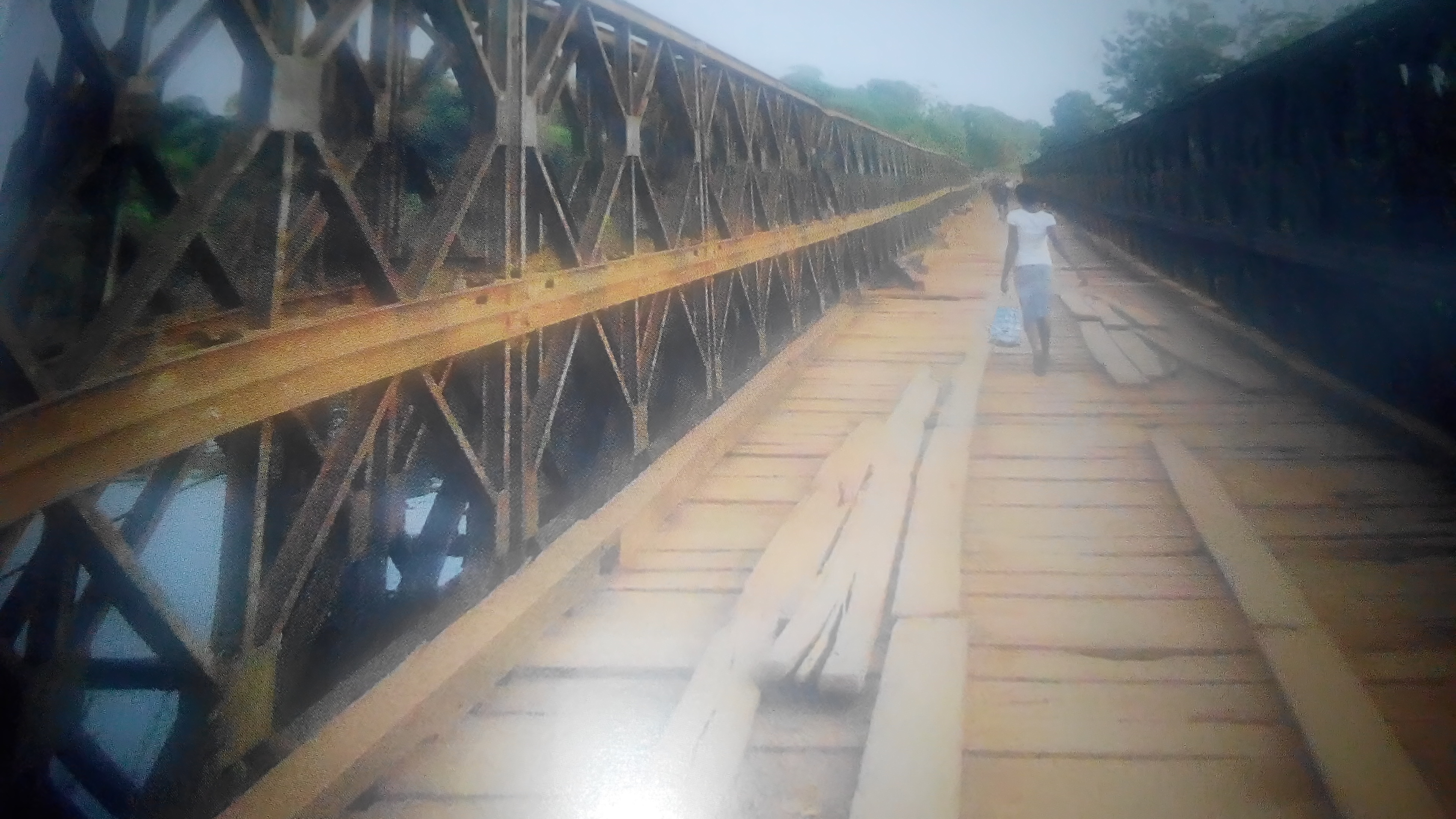
- Bridge over the Rubi River

- Location within Democratic Republic of the Congo

Location
- Country: Democratic Republic of the Congo

Physical characteristics
- Mouth: Itimbiri River
  - coordinates: 2.895878°N 24.048924°E

The Rubi River (French: Rivière Rubi) is a left tributary of the Itimbiri River, which forms where the Rubi joins the Likati River.

== Course ==
The Rubi River originates in the southeast of the Bas-Uélé province, then flows west until it meets the Likati near Djamba. The town of Buta is on the north bank of its central section. The Rubi crosses the Poko, Bambesa, Buta and Aketi territories. The Itimbiri is formed by the confluence of the Rubi River and the Likati River. (Note: As of August 2020 OpenStreetMap showed the section from the confluence of the Likati and the Rubi down to the confluence of the Tele River and Rubi as the Rubi River. This disagrees with the 1973 description from the Académie royale des Sciences d'Outre-Mer, which seems more plausible.) The largest tributaries of the Itimbiri-Rubi are the Likati, Aketi and Tele.

The Domaine de chasse de Rubi-Tele (Rubi-Tele Hunting Domain) was created between the Rubi and Tele rivers in 1930, and modified in 1932. It has an area of over 8,000 square kilometres (3,100 sq mi). It is one of the first protected areas in the DRC. The status is not clear, but some see it as an area where all hunting is prohibited, which feeds neighboring hunting areas.

== Sources ==
- Lederer, A. (1973), L'exploitation des affluents du Zaïre et des ports de l'intérieur de 1960 à 1971 (PDF), Bruxelles: Académie royale des Sciences d'Outre-Mer
- Omasombo Tshonda, Jean (2014), Bas-Uele Pouvoirs locaux et économie agricole : héritages d’un passé brouillé (PDF) (in French), Musée royal de l’Afrique centrale, ISBN 978-9-4916-1586-3
- "Relation: Itimbiri (9084)", OpenStreetMap
