= Mungbere =

- Location in Democratic Republic of the Congo
- Coordinates: 2°37′36″N 28°30′20″E
- Country: Democratic Republic of the Congo
- Province: Haut-Uele
- Territory: Watsa
- Chiefdom: Andobi
- Climate: Aw

Mungbere is a small town in Haut-Uele province, in the north of the Democratic Republic of Congo.

== Transport ==
It was served by the terminal of a now non-operational 600 mm (1 ft 11 5/8 in) narrow gauge railway from Bumba, known as the Vicicongo line.

== See also ==
- List of railway stations in the Democratic Republic of the Congo
