= Buta, Democratic Republic of the Congo =

Buta
- Provincial capital and city
- Ville de Buta
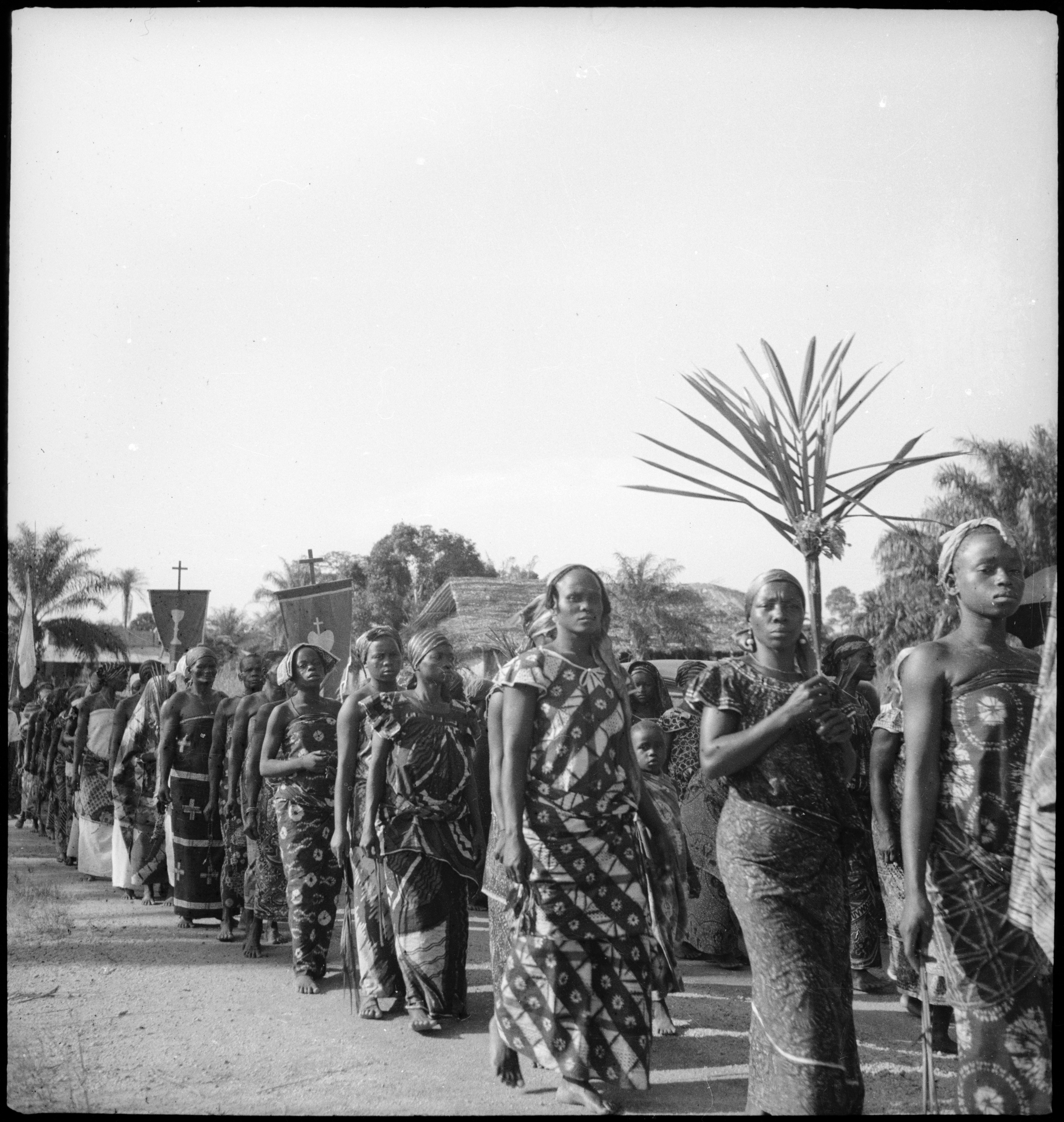
- Catholics in Buta around 1942

- Location in Democratic Republic of the Congo
- Coordinates: 2°48′N 24°44′E
- Country: DR Congo
- Province: Bas-Uele
- Communes: Babade, Dobea, Finant, Tepatondele

Government
  - Mayor: Madeleine Azevedo

Population (2012)
  - Total: 55,313
- Time zone: UTC+2 (Central Africa Time)
- Climate: Aw
- National language: Lingala

Buta is a city in the northern Democratic Republic of the Congo, lying on the Rubi River, a tributary of the Itimbiri River. It is the capital of Bas-Uele province. As of 2012, it had an estimated population of 55,313.

Batu is administratively divided into four communes—Babade, Dobea, Finant, and Tepatondele.

== History ==
In early 2005, the town was the centre of an outbreak of pulmonary plague.

== Education ==
Buta has many primary schools for students aged 6 to 14. After primary school is secondary school. Secondary school students are admitted into a 2 year orientation designed to deepen their understanding of what they learnt in primary school during their 7th and 8th year of school. This orientation period also allows students to choose more specific studies to focus their education. The school also offers a 4 year study period post-orientation before students go to university.

== Transport ==
=== Air ===
Buta is served by the Buta Zega Airport.

=== Train ===
Buta lies on the defunct narrow gauge Vicicongo line built by the Société des Chemins de Fer Vicinaux du Congo that ran east from Aketi on the Itimbiri River past Buta to Zobia, Isiro and Mungbere. The line ran from Kotili to Buta and onward to Andoma The line reached Buta on 1 July 1931. A branch line to Titulé via Andoma opened on 11 November 1932. Buta became an operational center for Vicicongo.

== See also ==
- Roman Catholic Diocese of Buta

== Sources ==
- Omasombo Tshonda, Jean (2014), Bas-Uele Pouvoirs locaux et économie agricole : héritages d'un passé brouillé (PDF) (in French), Musée royal de l’Afrique centrale, ISBN 978-9-4916-1586-3
