= Vicicongo line =

Railway in the Democratic Republic of Congo

- The Vicicongo line stretched from Bumba to Mungbere in north-eastern Congo.

Overview
- Status: unknown

History
- Opened: 1937

Technical
- Line length: 1,235 km (767 mi)
- Track gauge: 600 mm (1 ft 11 5/8 in)

Chemins de fer des Uele (Uele Railways or Vicicongo line) is a 600 mm (1 ft 11 5/8 in) narrow-gauge line in the north east of the Democratic Republic of the Congo. It was built between 1924 and 1937 as a portage railway bypassing Congo River rapids.

== Route ==
The line runs from the Congo River port Bumba in Mongala via Lower Uele to Mungbere in Upper Uele with branch lines to Bondo, Buta and Titule city. The total network is 1,235 kilometres (767 mi) long.

Operationally, the network consists of the following sections:

- Bumba–Aketi
- Aketi–Bondo
- Aketi–Buta–Isiro
- Liénart–Titule
- Buta–Buta Triangle Town
- Isiro–Mungbere

== History ==
The Uele railways were built 1924–1937 by a Belgian company, the Société des Chemins de Fer Vicinaux du Congo (Vicicongo). The first line ran from Aketi to Bondo and was built from leftover German army stocks used in trench railways or heeresfeldbahnen, which the Belgians acquired after World War I. Later, the line was extended from Komba to Buta Pauli (today Isiro) and Mungbere, which was reached in 1937. A planned expansion to the gold mines of Moto never materialized. In 1971 the railway was extended from Aketi along the Itimbiri river, to Bumba along the Congo River, as the water level of the rivers may be only 40 cm (1.3 ft), thus functioning as a portage railway.

In the early 2000s, operations on the entire length of the line ceased. The system is currently not operational, and was described by United Nations Joint Logistics Centre (UNJLC) in 2006 as 'very degraded'. A few trains ran in 2002/3. Bumba-Aketi was reopened in October 2004 after 14 years non operating. Up to 2008, Radio Okapi mentioned from time to time some trains in the Eastern parts. The line is not mentioned in the UNJLC description of the network. That and its very narrow gauge suggest it may be abandoned. This line and the Bumba river port belong to the Office of the Uele Railways. In May 2025 the DRC government issued request for proposals for company to rehabilitate and upgrade the line.

== Operators ==
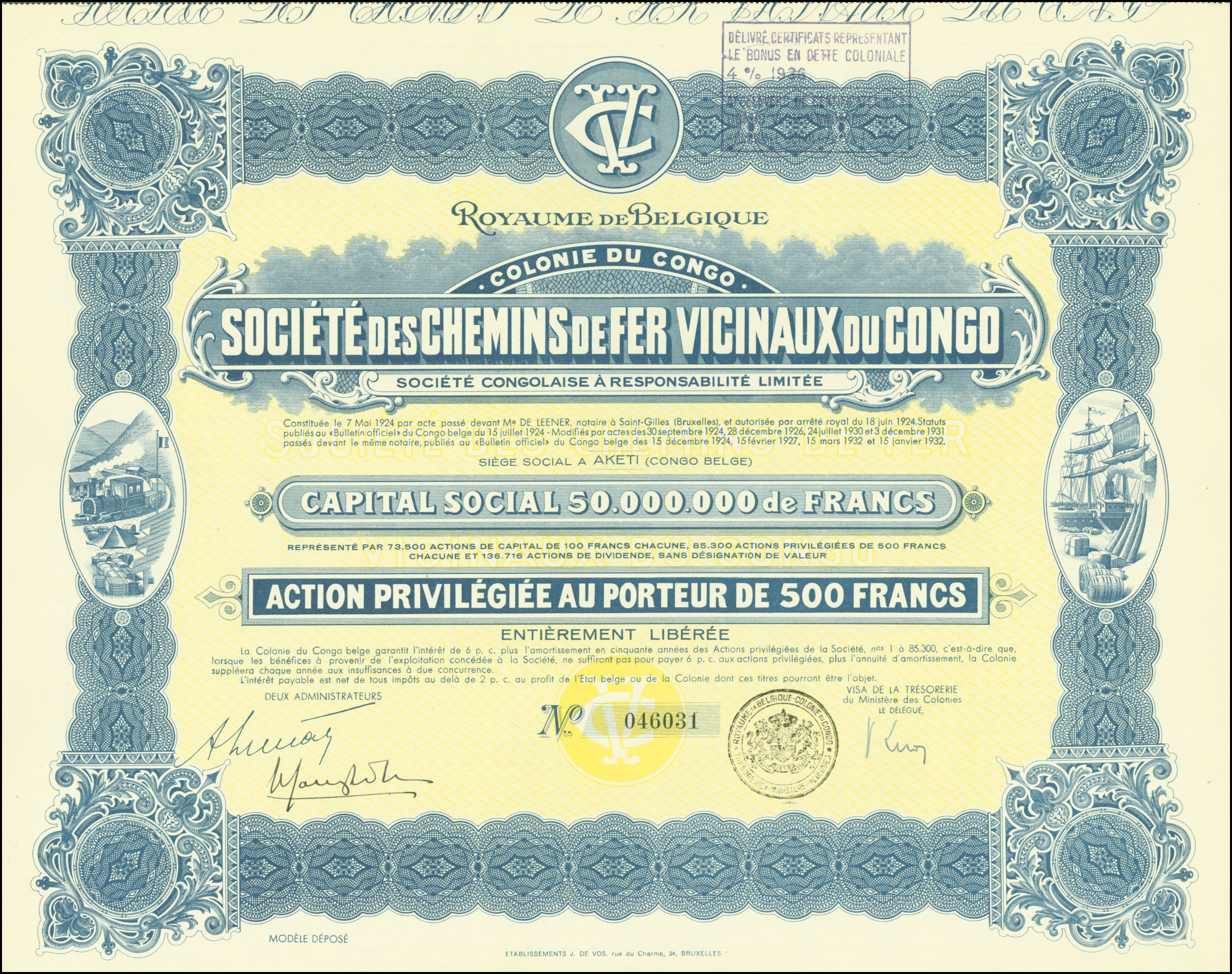
Preferred Share of the Société des Chemins de fer Vicinaux du Congo, issued 15. January 1932

- 1924: Builder and operator of the company was the Chemins de fer Vicinaux du Congo, CVC, colloquially Vicicongo; (Flemish: Buurtspoorwegen van Congo), based in Brussels.
- 1960: After independence a Congolese company of the same name based in Aketi took over operations. Later the name was changed to Chemins de Fer Vicinaux Zaire (CVZ).
- 1974: Societe Nationale des Chemins de Fer Zaïrois (SNCZ), merger of K.D.L., C.F.L, C.V.Z. (Chemins de Fer Vicinaux Zaire), C.F.M.K. and C.F.M.
- 1991: Dissolution of SNCZ, founding of SNCZ Holding and its subsidiaries O.C.S. (Office des Chemins de Fer du Sud, French Office for the Southern Railway), SFE (Société des Chemins de Fer de l'Est, French for Eastern Railway Company) and CFU (Office des Chemins de Fer of ülés, for French-Uele Railways).

Today the Uele railways are state-owned.

== See also ==
- Rail transport in the Democratic Republic of the Congo
