= Bumba, Democratic Republic of the Congo =

Bumba
- Commune
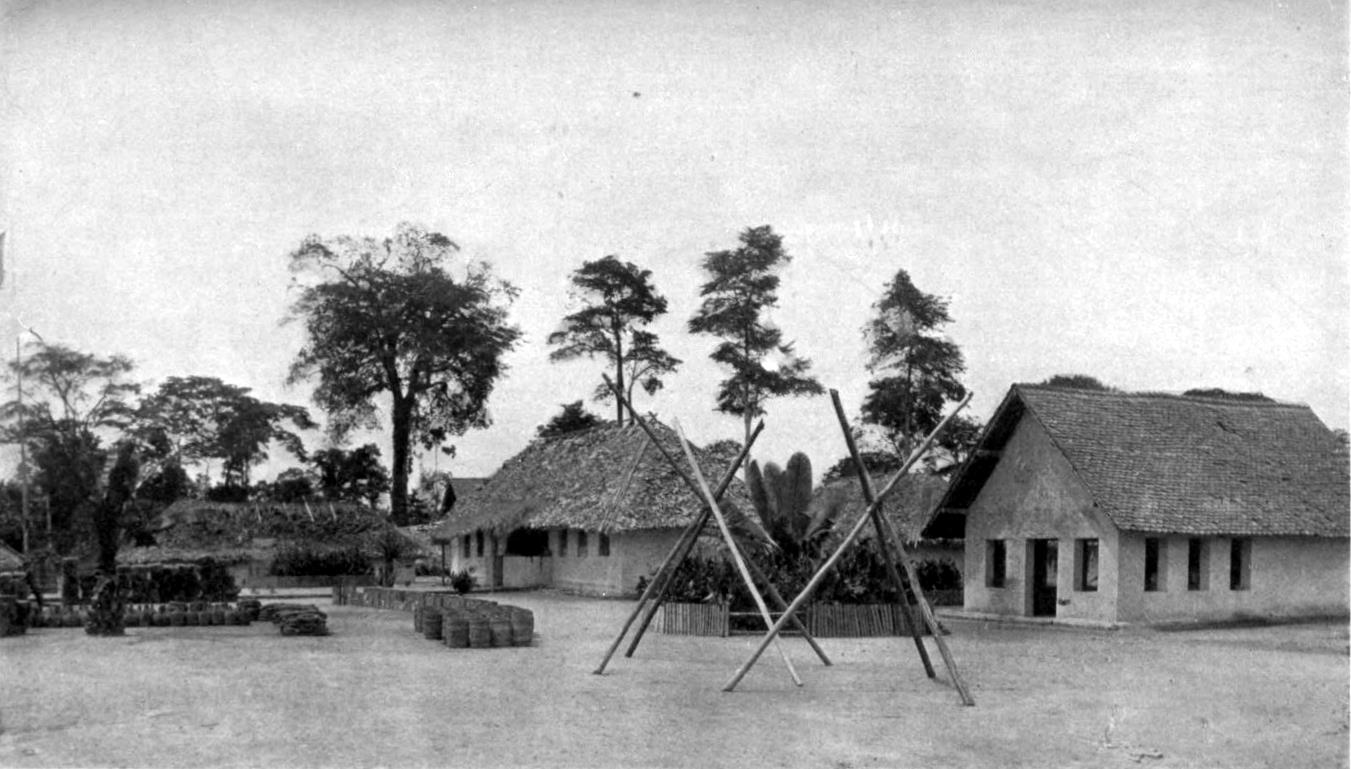
- Bumba in the Congo Free State, c. 1905

- Location within the Democratic Republic of the Congo Location within Africa
- Coordinates: 2°11′04″N 22°28′13″E
- Country: DR Congo
- Province: Mongala
- Territory: Bumba
- Elevation: 409 m (1,342 ft)

Population (2012)
  - Total: 107,307
- National Language: Lingala
- Climate: Af

Bumba is a town and river port in the Mongala Province of the Democratic Republic of the Congo. Lying on the Congo River, it is the administrative centre of the Bumba Territory. As of 2009, it has an estimated total population of 107,626 people. The town has neither electricity nor running water.

== Infrastructure ==
As of 2007, the 600 mm (1 ft 11 5/8 in) narrow-gauge Vicicongo line from Bumba to Isiro is not operational (see Transport in the DR Congo). The town is served by Bumba Airport. The Congo River serves as the main transportation artery.

== Notable people ==
- Marcel Lihau

== Climate ==
Climate data for Bumba, elevation 361 m (1,184 ft), (1971–2000)
Month	Jan	Feb	Mar	Apr	May	Jun	Jul	Aug	Sep	Oct	Nov	Dec	Year
Mean daily maximum °C (°F)	30.9 (87.6)	31.4 (88.5)	31.4 (88.5)	30.9 (87.6)	30.6 (87.1)	29.8 (85.6)	29.1 (84.4)	29.2 (84.6)	29.8 (85.6)	29.5 (85.1)	29.7 (85.5)	29.9 (85.8)	30.2 (86.3)
Mean daily minimum °C (°F)	20.1 (68.2)	20.0 (68.0)	20.6 (69.1)	21.0 (69.8)	21.0 (69.8)	20.5 (68.9)	20.4 (68.7)	20.4 (68.7)	20.1 (68.2)	20.2 (68.4)	20.3 (68.5)	19.8 (67.6)	20.4 (68.7)
Average precipitation mm (inches)	83.0 (3.27)	92.0 (3.62)	160.0 (6.30)	156.0 (6.14)	167.0 (6.57)	149.0 (5.87)	180.0 (7.09)	154.0 (6.06)	180.0 (7.09)	230.0 (9.06)	153.0 (6.02)	91.0 (3.58)	1,795 (70.67)
Average relative humidity (%)	85	82	84	84	85	86	88	87	87	86	86	85	85
Source: FAO

== See also ==
- List of railway stations in the Democratic Republic of the Congo
- Dr. Ngoy Mushola, the first person to record a description of Ebola
- AS Lokole, a Congolese football club in Bumba
