= Isiro =

Town in the Democratic Republic of the Congo

- Provincial capital and city
- Ville d'Isiro
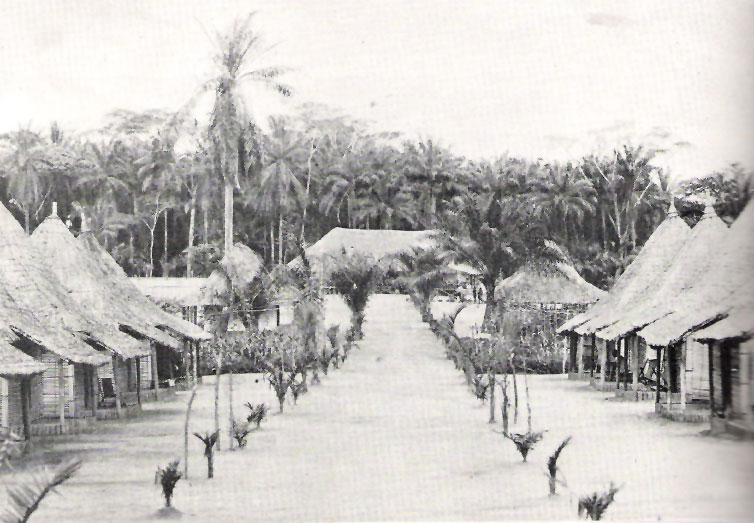
- Isiro, circa 1942

- Location in Democratic Republic of the Congo
- Coordinates: 2°46′N 27°37′E
- Country: DR Congo
- Province: Haut-Uele
- Communes: Kupa, Mambaya, Mendambo

Government
  - Mayor: Guillaume Lola
- Elevation: 730 m (2,400 ft)

Population (2012)
  - Total: 182,900
- Time zone: UTC+2 (CAT)
- Climate: Af
- National language: French, Lingala and Pa-Zande

Isiro (pronounced [iˈsiro]), formerly known as Paulis, is the capital of Haut-Uele Province in the northeastern part of the Democratic Republic of the Congo. It lies between the equatorial forest and the savannah and its main resource is coffee. Isiro's population is estimated at approximately 182,000. Most people speak Pa-Zande (Zande language), Lingala and Swahili.

== History ==
Isiro was named Paulis after colonel, later diplomat, Albert Paulis when it was part of the Belgian Congo. The city was developed in 1934 and reached its peak in 1957. In the troubled days of Congo's independence and its aftermath, operation Black Dragoon brought fighting between Belgian paratroopers and local Simba militias.

In 1998, Isiro became the home of a newly created Dominican-operated university called Université de l'Uélé. It is the third city in Orientale province (after Kisangani and Bunia) to welcome a university.

In 2015 Isiro became the capital of the Province of Haut-Uele, under governor Jean-Pierre Lola Kisanga 2015-2019.

In 2024 Isiro's population rose to over 400.000.

== Transport ==
Isiro is served by Matari Airport, a national airport with flights to Kinshasa, the capital. The isolated narrow gauge Vicicongo line to the river port of Bumba on the Congo River is not currently operational. The dirt roads to and from Isiro allow commercial trade with Uganda and South Sudan, in principle, but may be impassable in the wet season.

== People ==
- Marie Daulne (born 1964), singer
- Jean Bakomito Gambu (politician) Governor of Haut-Uele 2024-

== See also ==
- Roman Catholic Diocese of Isiro–Niangara
