= Bas-Uélé =

Province of the Democratic Republic of the Congo

Bas-Uélé Province du Bas-Uélé (French) Wɛlɛ ya Nsé (Lingala)
- Province
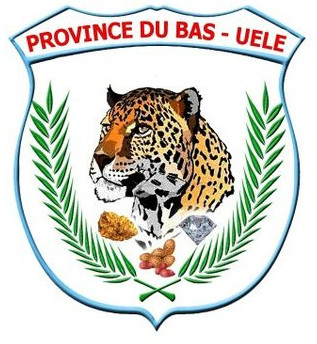
- Seal

- Coordinates: 2°48′8.84″N 24°44′1.17″E
- Country: DR Congo
- Established: 2015
- Named for: Uélé River
- Capital: Buta

Government
  - Governor: Mike Mokeni

Area
  - Total: 148,331 km^{2} (57,271 sq mi)

Population (2020 est.)
  - Total: 1,369,600
  - Density: 9.2334/km^{2} (23.914/sq mi)

Ethnic groups
  - Native: Azande • Mangbetu • Baboa • Ngombe • Bakango • Ngbandi • Asua • Barambo Babenza • Balele • Bakere
- Time zone: UTC+2 (CAT)
- License Plate Code: (Democratic Republic of the Congo) CGO / 02
- Official language: French
- National language: Pa-Zande (Zande language) and Lingala
- Website: https://bas-uele.gouv.cd/

Bas-Uélé (French for "Lower Uélé") is one of the 21 provinces of the Democratic Republic of the Congo created in the 2015 repartitioning. Bas-Uélé, Haut-Uélé, Ituri, and Tshopo provinces are the result of the dismemberment of the former Orientale Province. Bas-Uélé was formed from the Bas-Uele District whose town of Buta was elevated to capital city of the new province.

== Administration ==
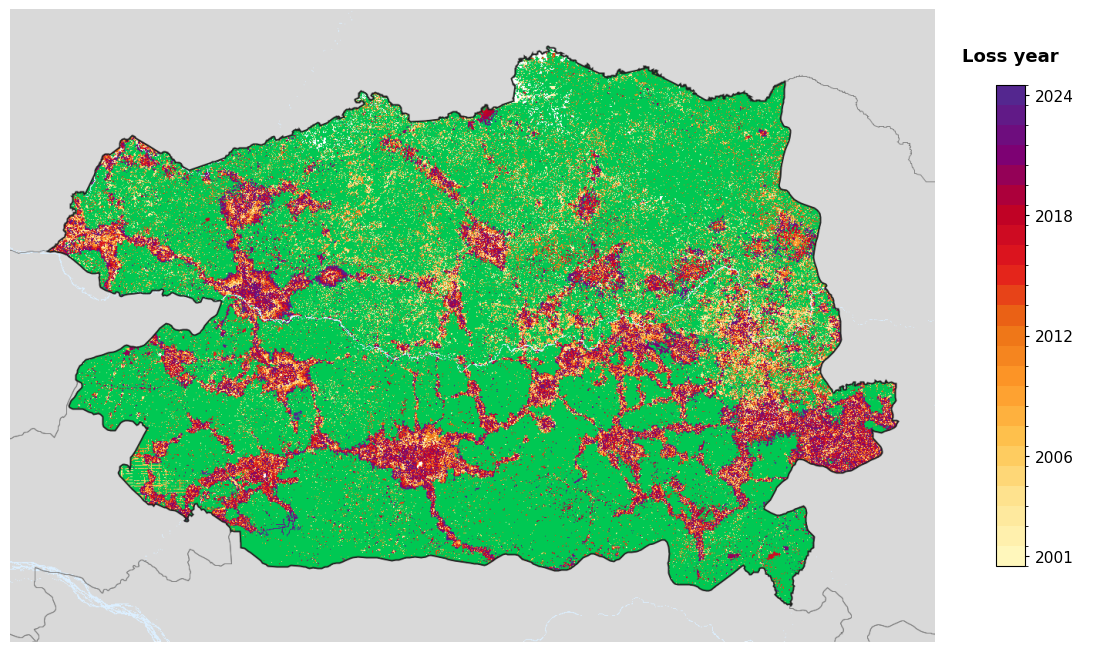
Tree-cover loss year in Bas-Uélé, 2001-2024, from the Global Forest Change dataset.

Bas-Uélé lies in the north-east of DRC on the Uélé River. The province is divided in to six territories and one independently administered city.

| Administrative divisions | Type | Map |
|---|---|---|
| Buta | City | Buta |
| Aketi | Territory | Aketi |
| Ango | Territory | Ango |
| Bambesa | Territory | Bambesa |
| Bondo | Territory | Bondo |
| Buta | Territory | Buta |
| Poko | Territory | Poko |

== People ==
Most of the inhabitants of the Bas-Uélé Province, with a population of 900,000 in 2007, are Azandé people. There are other peoples such as the Boa, Bakere, Balele, Bakango, Babenza, etc., who are also present in this province. They live mainly through subsistence farming and hunting, with some river commerce.

== Ebola ==
in 2017, three people were reported dead and six suspected with the Ebola virus. The nation declared an Ebola outbreak. Since the authentic announcement of the epidemic by the country's Ministry of Health on 12 May, two people were declared Ebola-positive, one died from the disease. In order to forestall the unfolding of the disease, all people with hemorrhagic fever began being tracked, their blood analyzed, and the fitness state of affairs of all people who had been in contact with a suspected case are intently monitored.
