= Chiefdoms and sectors of the Democratic Republic of the Congo =

Administrative divisions of the Democratic Republic of the Congo

In the Democratic Republic of the Congo, chiefdoms (fr. chefferies) and sectors (fr. secteurs) are rural administrative divisions of territories (fr. territoires). They are further subdivided into groupings (fr. groupements) which themselves are divided into villages. Chiefdoms and groupings are led by traditional leaders officially recognized by the government, whereas sector chiefs are appointed directly by the government.

== History ==
The decree of 2 May 1910 consolidated Belgian colonial control in the Congo, as it formalized the administrative system of chiefdoms and sectors. The decree also established a dual judicial system by separating the legal framework applied to colonized populations from that applied to European colonizers. Although chiefs and sub-chiefs were permitted to exercise authority, their decisions were only valid insofar as they complied with colonial regulations.

While colonial administrators claimed that the system preserved customary law, in reality it transformed chiefs into intermediaries of colonial authority. They were tasked with enforcing colonial policies, including the collection of taxes, the recruitment of forced labor, and the redistribution of land. According to historian Jacques Depelchin, the system created an institutional buffer between rulers and the ruled local population. Other scholars have argued that this arrangement produced a form of "decentralized despotism" that granted chiefs broad and often unchecked authority over communities that were sometimes ethnically diverse and had limited means to challenge their rule. This structure also contributed to the territorialization of identity. Historian John Iliffe, in his 1995 socio-historical study Africans: The History of a Continent, notes that communities that resisted this administrative restructuring often became the nucleus of early twentieth-century armed resistance movements, including the Batetela rebellions in the Congo, the Mau Mau uprising in Kenya, the First and Second Matabele Wars in Zimbabwe, and the Anglo-Ashanti wars in Ghana, which reflected widespread opposition to colonial systems that undermined traditional political structures and imposed new forms of authority.

Post-colonial legislation largely retained the foundations of this colonial system, with Article 124 of Ordinance-Law No. 82-006 of 25 February 1982 (Republic of Zaire) and Decree-Law No. 081 of 2 July 1998 (Democratic Republic of the Congo) define the chiefdoms and sectors as decentralized administrative entities composed of a generally homogeneous group of traditional communities organized according to custom and led by a customary chief recognized by public authorities. The 2006 Constitution of the Democratic Republic of the Congo, like earlier constitutions following the Colonial Charter of 1908, dedicates only a single provision to customary authority. Article 207 recognizes customary authority and stipulates that it must be exercised in accordance with local custom, provided that such customs do not contradict the Constitution, statutory law, public order, or moral standards. It also states that customary chiefs who wish to hold elected public office must submit themselves to election and that customary authorities have a duty to promote national unity and cohesion.

Chiefdoms and sectors are administered according to customary practices, provided that such customs do not conflict with public law, legislation, or regulatory provisions. In essence, this definition largely reproduces the colonial model of governance by organizing indigenous populations into chiefdoms and sectors, while assigning the provincial governor the authority to determine the number and designation of these administrative divisions within each territory. Within customary systems themselves, succession to chiefdoms and sectors typically follows two principal modes: hereditary succession and rotational succession. In hereditary systems, succession is vertical. In patriarchal societies, such as among the Luba, authority usually passes from father to son or, failing that, to a brother. In matrilineal societies, such as among the Kongo, Bemba, and Yaka, succession may pass from a man to his sister's son or, alternatively, to a brother. The rotational system operates on a horizontal principle of succession, and, in this arrangement, leadership rotates among two or more clans according to agreements established between the communities concerned. In many societies, the ruling family council plays an important role in determining succession. This council may approve or reject the candidate designated by custom, which thus ensures that the chosen leader is accepted by the broader lineage. Some traditions also recognize the possibility of women inheriting customary authority, though such cases are less common.

== List of chiefdoms and sectors ==
According to the Independent National Electoral Commission (CENI), as of 2018 there are a total of 734 chiefdoms and sectors. Other sources give 735 in 2017 and 737 for 2020.

Chiefdom / Sector	Territory	Province
Avuru-Duma Chiefdom	Aketi Territory	Bas-Uélé Province
Avuru-Gatanga Chiefdom	Aketi Territory	Bas-Uélé Province
Bondongola Chiefdom	Aketi Territory	Bas-Uélé Province
Mabinza Chiefdom	Aketi Territory	Bas-Uélé Province
Mobati-Boyele Chiefdom	Aketi Territory	Bas-Uélé Province
Mongwandi Chiefdom	Aketi Territory	Bas-Uélé Province
Gbandi Sector	Aketi Territory	Bas-Uélé Province
Yoko Sector	Aketi Territory	Bas-Uélé Province
Ezo Chiefdom	Ango Territory	Bas-Uélé Province
Mopoy Chiefdom	Ango Territory	Bas-Uélé Province
Ngindo Chiefdom	Ango Territory	Bas-Uélé Province
Sasa Chiefdom	Ango Territory	Bas-Uélé Province
Aluru Chiefdom	Aru Territory	Ituri Province
Kakwa Chiefdom	Aru Territory	Ituri Province
Kaliko-Omi Chiefdom	Aru Territory	Ituri Province
Lu Chiefdom	Aru Territory	Ituri Province
Ndo-Okebo Chiefdom	Aru Territory	Ituri Province
Nio-Kamule Chiefdom	Aru Territory	Ituri Province
Otso Chiefdom	Aru Territory	Ituri Province
Zaki Chiefdom	Aru Territory	Ituri Province
Bafwandaka Sector	Bafwasende Territory	Tshopo Province
Bakumu d'Angumu Sector	Bafwasende Territory	Tshopo Province
Bakundumu Sector	Bafwasende Territory	Tshopo Province
Barumbi-Opienge Sector	Bafwasende Territory	Tshopo Province
Bekeni-Kondolole Sector	Bafwasende Territory	Tshopo Province
Bemili Sector	Bafwasende Territory	Tshopo Province
Kidzweme Sector	Bagata Territory	Kwilu Province
Kwango-Kasai Sector	Bagata Territory	Kwilu Province
Kwilu-Ntobere Sector	Bagata Territory	Kwilu Province
Manzasay Sector	Bagata Territory	Kwilu Province
Wamba-Fatundu Sector	Bagata Territory	Kwilu Province
Bakere Bakete Chiefdom	Bambesa Territory	Bas-Uélé Province
Bokapo Chiefdom	Bambesa Territory	Bas-Uélé Province
Bokiba Chiefdom	Bambesa Territory	Bas-Uélé Province
Bulungwa Chiefdom	Bambesa Territory	Bas-Uélé Province
Makere I Chiefdom	Bambesa Territory	Bas-Uélé Province
Makere II Chiefdom	Bambesa Territory	Bas-Uélé Province
Makere-Bakeke Chiefdom	Bambesa Territory	Bas-Uélé Province
Mange Chiefdom	Bambesa Territory	Bas-Uélé Province
Mondwangali Chiefdom	Bambesa Territory	Bas-Uélé Province
Baboa de Kole Sector	Banalia Territory	Tshopo Province
Baboro Sector	Banalia Territory	Tshopo Province
Bamanga Sector	Banalia Territory	Tshopo Province
Banalia Bangba Sector	Banalia Territory	Tshopo Province
Popoy Sector	Banalia Territory	Tshopo Province
Basankusu Sector	Basankusu Territory	Équateur Province
Gombalo Sector	Basankusu Territory	Équateur Province
Waka-Bokeka Sector	Basankusu Territory	Équateur Province
Bangelema-Mongandjo Sector	Basoko Territory	Tshopo Province
Bomenge Sector	Basoko Territory	Tshopo Province
Lukutu Sector	Basoko Territory	Tshopo Province
Mobango-Itimbiri Sector	Basoko Territory	Tshopo Province
Turumbu Sector	Basoko Territory	Tshopo Province
Yaliwasa Chiefdom	Basoko Territory	Tshopo Province
Yamandundu Chiefdom	Basoko Territory	Tshopo Province
Wahanga Chiefdom	Basoko Territory	Tshopo Province
Befumbo Sector	Befale Territory	Tshuapa Province
Duale Sector	Befale Territory	Tshuapa Province
Lomako Sector	Befale Territory	Tshuapa Province
Bashu Chiefdom	Beni Territory	North Kivu Province
Beni Sector	Beni Territory	North Kivu Province
Ruwenzori Sector	Beni Territory	North Kivu Province
Watalinga Chiefdom	Beni Territory	North Kivu Province
Ekonda Sector	Bikoro Territory	Équateur Province
Elanga Sector	Bikoro Territory	Équateur Province
Lac Ntomba Sector	Bikoro Territory	Équateur Province
Bolua Sector	Boende Territory	Tshuapa Province
Djera Sector	Boende Territory	Tshuapa Province
Lofoy Sector	Boende Territory	Tshuapa Province
Wini Sector	Boende Territory	Tshuapa Province
Loombo Sector	Bokungu Territory	Tshuapa Province
Lolaka Sector	Bokungu Territory	Tshuapa Province
Luando Sector	Bokungu Territory	Tshuapa Province
Luay Sector	Bokungu Territory	Tshuapa Province
Nkole Chiefdom	Bokungu Territory	Tshuapa Province
Bateke-Nord Chiefdom	Bolobo Territory	Mai-Ndombe Province
Bolomba Sector	Bolomba Territory	Équateur Province
Busira Sector	Bolomba Territory	Équateur Province
Dianga Chiefdom	Bolomba Territory	Équateur Province
Lusanganya Sector	Bolomba Territory	Équateur Province
Mampoko Sector	Bolomba Territory	Équateur Province
Djamba Sector	Bomongo Territory	Équateur Province
Ngiri Sector	Bomongo Territory	Équateur Province
Bongandanga Sector	Bongandanga Territory	Mongala Province
Boso-Djanoa Sector	Bongandanga Territory	Mongala Province
Boso-Melo Sector	Bongandanga Territory	Mongala Province
Boso-Simba Sector	Bongandanga Territory	Mongala Province
Biamange Chiefdom	Bondo Territory	Bas-Uélé Province
Boso Chiefdom	Bondo Territory	Bas-Uélé Province
Deni Chiefdom	Bondo Territory	Bas-Uélé Province
Duaru Chiefdom	Bondo Territory	Bas-Uélé Province
Gama Chiefdom	Bondo Territory	Bas-Uélé Province
Gaya Chiefdom	Bondo Territory	Bas-Uélé Province
Goa Chiefdom	Bondo Territory	Bas-Uélé Province
Kasa Chiefdom	Bondo Territory	Bas-Uélé Province
Mobenge-Mondila Chiefdom	Bondo Territory	Bas-Uélé Province
Soa Chiefdom	Bondo Territory	Bas-Uélé Province
Bandas Sector	Bosobolo Territory	Nord-Ubangi Province
Bosobolo Sector	Bosobolo Territory	Nord-Ubangi Province
Bili Sector	Bosobolo Territory	Nord-Ubangi Province
Banza Sector	Budjala Territory	Sud-Ubangi Province
Bolingo Sector	Budjala Territory	Sud-Ubangi Province
Mongala Motima Sector	Budjala Territory	Sud-Ubangi Province
Ndolo-Liboko Sector	Budjala Territory	Sud-Ubangi Province
Ngombe-Doko de Lekimi Sector	Budjala Territory	Sud-Ubangi Province
Butumba Chiefdom	Bukama Territory	Haut-Lomami Province
Kabondo Dianda Chiefdom	Bukama Territory	Haut-Lomami Province
Kapamayi Chiefdom	Bukama Territory	Haut-Lomami Province
Kibanda Chiefdom	Bukama Territory	Haut-Lomami Province
Kinkondja Chiefdom	Bukama Territory	Haut-Lomami Province
Lualaba Sector	Bukama Territory	Haut-Lomami Province
Umpungu Chiefdom	Bukama Territory	Haut-Lomami Province
Dwe Sector	Bulungu Territory	Kwilu Province
Imbongo Sector	Bulungu Territory	Kwilu Province
Kilunda Sector	Bulungu Territory	Kwilu Province
Kipuka Sector	Bulungu Territory	Kwilu Province
Kwenge Sector	Bulungu Territory	Kwilu Province
Kwilu-Kimbata Sector	Bulungu Territory	Kwilu Province
Luniungu Sector	Bulungu Territory	Kwilu Province
Mikwi Sector	Bulungu Territory	Kwilu Province
Niadi Nkara Sector	Bulungu Territory	Kwilu Province
Nko Sector	Bulungu Territory	Kwilu Province
Banda Yowa Sector	Bumba Territory	Mongala Province
Itimbiri Sector	Bumba Territory	Mongala Province
Loeka Sector	Bumba Territory	Mongala Province
Molua Sector	Bumba Territory	Mongala Province
Monzamboli Sector	Bumba Territory	Mongala Province
Yandongi Sector	Bumba Territory	Mongala Province
Bodangabo Sector	Businga Territory	Nord-Ubangi Province
Businga Sector	Businga Territory	Nord-Ubangi Province
Karawa Sector	Businga Territory	Nord-Ubangi Province
Barisi-Mongingita Chiefdom	Buta Territory	Bas-Uélé Province
Bayeu-Bogongia Chiefdom	Buta Territory	Bas-Uélé Province
Bayeu-Bogbama Chiefdom	Buta Territory	Bas-Uélé Province
Mobati Chiefdom	Buta Territory	Bas-Uélé Province
Monganzolo Chiefdom	Buta Territory	Bas-Uélé Province
Nguru Chiefdom	Buta Territory	Bas-Uélé Province
Ndengese-Ikolombe Chiefdom	Dekese Territory	Kasaï Province
Yaelima Chiefdom	Dekese Territory	Kasaï Province
Diofwa Sector	Demba Territory	Kasaï-Central Province
Lombelo Sector	Demba Territory	Kasaï-Central Province
Lusonge Sector	Demba Territory	Kasaï-Central Province
Bena-Mamba Sector	Demba Territory	Kasaï-Central Province
Muanza-Ngoma Sector	Demba Territory	Kasaï-Central Province
Tshibote Sector	Demba Territory	Kasaï-Central Province
Tshibungu Sector	Demba Territory	Kasaï-Central Province
Dibanda Sector	Dibaya Territory	Kasaï-Central Province
Dibataie Sector	Dibaya Territory	Kasaï-Central Province
Kamwandu Sector	Dibaya Territory	Kasaï-Central Province
Kasangidi Sector	Dibaya Territory	Kasaï-Central Province
Tshishilu Sector	Dibaya Territory	Kasaï-Central Province
Luena Sector	Dilolo Territory	Lualaba Province
Lulua-Lukoshi Sector	Dilolo Territory	Lualaba Province
Mutanda Sector	Dilolo Territory	Lualaba Province
Muyeye Chiefdom	Dilolo Territory	Lualaba Province
Mwakandala Chiefdom	Dilolo Territory	Lualaba Province
Mwatshisenge Chiefdom	Dilolo Territory	Lualaba Province
Ndumba Chiefdom	Dilolo Territory	Lualaba Province
Saluseke Chiefdom	Dilolo Territory	Lualaba Province
Tshisangana Chiefdom	Dilolo Territory	Lualaba Province
Kunduyi Sector	Dimbelenge Territory	Kasaï-Central Province
Lubi Sector	Dimbelenge Territory	Kasaï-Central Province
Lubudi Sector	Dimbelenge Territory	Kasaï-Central Province
Lukibu Sector	Dimbelenge Territory	Kasaï-Central Province
Mashala Sector	Dimbelenge Territory	Kasaï-Central Province
Djolu Sector	Djolu Territory	Tshuapa Province
Lingomo Sector	Djolu Territory	Tshuapa Province
Luo Sector	Djolu Territory	Tshuapa Province
Yala Sector	Djolu Territory	Tshuapa Province
Bahema Badjere Chiefdom	Djugu Territory	Ituri Province
Bahema Baguru Chiefdom	Djugu Territory	Ituri Province
Bahema Banywagi Chiefdom	Djugu Territory	Ituri Province
Bahema Nord Chiefdom	Djugu Territory	Ituri Province
Banyali-Kilo Sector	Djugu Territory	Ituri Province
Mabendi Chiefdom	Djugu Territory	Ituri Province
Mambisa Chiefdom	Djugu Territory	Ituri Province
Ndo-Okebo Chiefdom	Djugu Territory	Ituri Province
Walendu Djatsi Sector	Djugu Territory	Ituri Province
Walendu Pitsi Sector	Djugu Territory	Ituri Province
Walendu-Tatsi Sector	Djugu Territory	Ituri Province
Ndolomo Chiefdom	Dungu Territory	Haut-Uélé Province
Malingindu Chiefdom	Dungu Territory	Haut-Uélé Province
Wando Chiefdom	Dungu Territory	Haut-Uélé Province
Dongo Chiefdom	Faradje Territory	Haut-Uélé Province
Kakwa Chiefdom	Faradje Territory	Haut-Uélé Province
Logo-Bagela Chiefdom	Faradje Territory	Haut-Uélé Province
Logo-Doka Chiefdom	Faradje Territory	Haut-Uélé Province
Logo-Lolia Chiefdom	Faradje Territory	Haut-Uélé Province
Logo-Obeleba Chiefdom	Faradje Territory	Haut-Uélé Province
Logo-Ogambi Chiefdom	Faradje Territory	Haut-Uélé Province
Mondo Chiefdom	Faradje Territory	Haut-Uélé Province
Feshi Sector	Feshi Territory	Kwango Province
Ganaketi Sector	Feshi Territory	Kwango Province
Kobo Sector	Feshi Territory	Kwango Province
Mukoso Sector	Feshi Territory	Kwango Province
Lulenge Sector	Fizi Territory	South Kivu Province
Mutambala Sector	Fizi Territory	South Kivu Province
Ngandja Sector	Fizi Territory	South Kivu Province
Tanganyika Sector	Fizi Territory	South Kivu Province
Banga-Kungu Sector	Gemena Territory	Sud-Ubangi Province
Bowase Sector	Gemena Territory	Sud-Ubangi Province
Mbari Sector	Gemena Territory	Sud-Ubangi Province
Nguya Sector	Gemena Territory	Sud-Ubangi Province
Gungu Sector	Gungu Territory	Kwilu Province
Kandale Sector	Gungu Territory	Kwilu Province
Kilamba Sector	Gungu Territory	Kwilu Province
Kilemba Sector	Gungu Territory	Kwilu Province
Kisunzu Sector	Gungu Territory	Kwilu Province
Kobo Sector	Gungu Territory	Kwilu Province
Kondo Sector	Gungu Territory	Kwilu Province
Mudikalunga Sector	Gungu Territory	Kwilu Province
Mungindu Sector	Gungu Territory	Kwilu Province
Lozo Sector	Gungu Territory	Kwilu Province
Lukamba Sector	Gungu Territory	Kwilu Province
Ngudi Sector	Gungu Territory	Kwilu Province
Banga Sector	Idiofa Territory	Kwilu Province
Belo Sector	Idiofa Territory	Kwilu Province
Bulwem Sector	Idiofa Territory	Kwilu Province
Kalanganda Sector	Idiofa Territory	Kwilu Province
Kanga Sector	Idiofa Territory	Kwilu Province
Kapia Sector	Idiofa Territory	Kwilu Province
Kipuku Sector	Idiofa Territory	Kwilu Province
Madimbi Sector	Idiofa Territory	Kwilu Province
Mateko Sector	Idiofa Territory	Kwilu Province
Musanga-Idiofa Sector	Idiofa Territory	Kwilu Province
Sedzo Sector	Idiofa Territory	Kwilu Province
Yasa-lokwa Sector	Idiofa Territory	Kwilu Province
Ntambuka Chiefdom	Idjwi Territory	South Kivu Province
Rubenga Chiefdom	Idjwi Territory	South Kivu Province
Loile Sector	Ikela Territory	Tshuapa Province
Lofome Sector	Ikela Territory	Tshuapa Province
Lokina Sector	Ikela Territory	Tshuapa Province
Tumbenga Sector	Ikela Territory	Tshuapa Province
Tshuapa Sector	Ikela Territory	Tshuapa Province
Basongo Sector	Ilebo Territory	Kasaï Province
Mapangu Sector	Ilebo Territory	Kasaï Province
Malu-Malu Sector	Ilebo Territory	Kasaï Province
Sud-Banga Sector	Ilebo Territory	Kasaï Province
Bokatola Sector	Ingende Territory	Équateur Province
Duali Sector	Ingende Territory	Équateur Province
Eungu Sector	Ingende Territory	Équateur Province
Basengele Sector	Inongo Territory	Mai-Ndombe Province
Bolia Sector	Inongo Territory	Mai-Ndombe Province
Inongo Sector	Inongo Territory	Mai-Ndombe Province
Andisoma Chiefdom	Irumu Territory	Ituri Province
Babelebe Chiefdom	Irumu Territory	Ituri Province
Baboa-Bakoe Chiefdom	Irumu Territory	Ituri Province
Bahema-Boga Chiefdom	Irumu Territory	Ituri Province
Bahema d'Irumu Chiefdom	Irumu Territory	Ituri Province
Bahema Mitego Chiefdom	Irumu Territory	Ituri Province
Bahema Sud Chiefdom	Irumu Territory	Ituri Province
Baniari-Tchabi Chiefdom	Irumu Territory	Ituri Province
Basili Chiefdom	Irumu Territory	Ituri Province
Mobala Chiefdom	Irumu Territory	Ituri Province
Walendu Bindi Chiefdom	Irumu Territory	Ituri Province
Walese Vonkutu Chiefdom	Irumu Territory	Ituri Province
Baluolambila Chiefdom	Isangi Territory	Tshopo Province
Bambelota Sector	Isangi Territory	Tshopo Province
Bolomboki Chiefdom	Isangi Territory	Tshopo Province
Kombe Chiefdom	Isangi Territory	Tshopo Province
Liutua Sector	Isangi Territory	Tshopo Province
Lokombe Sector	Isangi Territory	Tshopo Province
Lueta Sector	Isangi Territory	Tshopo Province
Turumbu Sector	Isangi Territory	Tshopo Province
Yalihila Chiefdom	Isangi Territory	Tshopo Province
Yalikandja-Yanongo Sector	Isangi Territory	Tshopo Province
Yalikoka-Mboso Chiefdom	Isangi Territory	Tshopo Province
Yaokandja Sector	Isangi Territory	Tshopo Province
Yawembe-Basoa Sector	Isangi Territory	Tshopo Province
Luela-Luvunguye Sector	Kabalo Territory	Tanganyika Province
Lukuswa Sector	Kabalo Territory	Tanganyika Province
Babuyu Sector	Kabambare Territory	Maniema Province
Bahemba Sector	Kabambare Territory	Maniema Province
Bahombo Sector	Kabambare Territory	Maniema Province
Lulindi Sector	Kabambare Territory	Maniema Province
Saramabila Sector	Kabambare Territory	Maniema Province
Wamaza Sector	Kabambare Territory	Maniema Province
Kabare Chiefdom	Kabare Territory	South Kivu Province
Nindja Chiefdom	Kabare Territory	South Kivu Province
Kalela Sector	Kabeya-Kamwanga Territory	Kasaï-Oriental Province
Lac Munkamba Sector	Kabeya-Kamwanga Territory	Kasaï-Oriental Province
Mpemba Sector	Kabeya-Kamwanga Territory	Kasaï-Oriental Province
Ndomba Sector	Kabeya-Kamwanga Territory	Kasaï-Oriental Province
Baluba-Lubangule Sector	Kabinda Territory	Lomami Province
Kabinda Sector	Kabinda Territory	Lomami Province
Ludimbi-Lukula Sector	Kabinda Territory	Lomami Province
Lufubu-Lomami Sector	Kabinda Territory	Lomami Province
Lukashi-Lualu Sector	Kabinda Territory	Lomami Province
Vunayi Sector	Kabinda Territory	Lomami Province
Nord-Baluba Sector	Kabongo Territory	Haut-Lomami Province
Kabongo Chiefdom	Kabongo Territory	Haut-Lomami Province
Kayamba Chiefdom	Kabongo Territory	Haut-Lomami Province
Kulindji Sector	Kahemba Territory	Kwango Province
Bindu Sector	Kahemba Territory	Kwango Province
Bangu Sector	Kahemba Territory	Kwango Province
Muloshi Chiefdom	Kahemba Territory	Kwango Province
Mwa-Mushiko Chiefdom	Kahemba Territory	Kwango Province
Mwendjila Chiefdom	Kahemba Territory	Kwango Province
Buhavu Chiefdom	Kalehe Territory	South Kivu Province
Buloho Chiefdom	Kalehe Territory	South Kivu Province
Benze Chiefdom	Kalemie Territory	Tanganyika Province
Rutuku Chiefdom	Kalemie Territory	Tanganyika Province
Tumbwe Chiefdom	Kalemie Territory	Tanganyika Province
Basanga Chiefdom	Kambove Territory	Haut-Katanga Province
Lufira Sector	Kambove Territory	Haut-Katanga Province
Sources du fleuve Congo Sector	Kambove Territory	Haut-Katanga Province
Kamiji Sector	Kamiji Territory	Lomami Province
Luekeshi Sector	Kamiji Territory	Lomami Province
Kasongo Nyembo Chiefdom	Kamina Territory	Haut-Lomami Province
Kinda Sector	Kamina Territory	Haut-Lomami Province
Mutombo-Mukulu Chiefdom	Kaniama Territory	Haut-Lomami Province
Mwant-Yav Chiefdom	Kapanga Territory	Lualaba Province
Kasangulu Sector	Kasangulu Territory	Kongo Central Province
Luila Sector	Kasangulu Territory	Kongo Central Province
Lukunga-Mputu Sector	Kasangulu Territory	Kongo Central Province
Bakunda Sector	Kasenga Territory	Haut-Katanga Province
Kafira Sector	Kasenga Territory	Haut-Katanga Province
Kisamamba Sector	Kasenga Territory	Haut-Katanga Province
Luapula Sector	Kasenga Territory	Haut-Katanga Province
Bakwange Chiefdom	Kasongo Territory	Maniema Province
Basonge 1 Chiefdom	Kasongo Territory	Maniema Province
Basonge 2 Mweho Sector	Kasongo Territory	Maniema Province
Benia Samba Chiefdom	Kasongo Territory	Maniema Province
Mamba-Kasenga Sector	Kasongo Territory	Maniema Province
Nonda Chiefdom	Kasongo Territory	Maniema Province
Wagenia Chiefdom	Kasongo Territory	Maniema Province
Wazimba-Maringa Sector	Kasongo Territory	Maniema Province
Wazimba wa Mulu Sector	Kasongo Territory	Maniema Province
Wazula Chiefdom	Kasongo Territory	Maniema Province
Kasa Chiefdom	Kasongo Lunda Territory	Kwango Province
Kasongo-Lunda Chiefdom	Kasongo Lunda Territory	Kwango Province
Kibunda Sector	Kasongo Lunda Territory	Kwango Province
Kingulu Sector	Kasongo Lunda Territory	Kwango Province
Kizamba Sector	Kasongo Lunda Territory	Kwango Province
Mawanga Sector	Kasongo Lunda Territory	Kwango Province
Panzi Sector	Kasongo Lunda Territory	Kwango Province
Swa Tenda Sector	Kasongo Lunda Territory	Kwango Province
Lukumbe Sector	Katako-Kombe Territory	Sankuru Province
Ngandu Sector	Katako-Kombe Territory	Sankuru Province
Ukulungu Sector	Katako-Kombe Territory	Sankuru Province
Watambulu-Nord Sector	Katako-Kombe Territory	Sankuru Province
Watambulu-Sud Sector	Katako-Kombe Territory	Sankuru Province
Baluba-Lubilanji Sector	Katanda Territory	Kasaï-Oriental Province
Mutuayi Sector	Katanda Territory	Kasaï-Oriental Province
Nsangu Sector	Katanda Territory	Kasaï-Oriental Province
Tshitolo Sector	Katanda Territory	Kasaï-Oriental Province
Bashi-Mboie Sector	Kazumba Territory	Kasaï-Central Province
Bena-Ngoshi Sector	Kazumba Territory	Kasaï-Central Province
Bulungu Sector	Kazumba Territory	Kasaï-Central Province
Kafuba Sector	Kazumba Territory	Kasaï-Central Province
Kavula Sector	Kazumba Territory	Kasaï-Central Province
Matamba Sector	Kazumba Territory	Kasaï-Central Province
Miao Sector	Kazumba Territory	Kasaï-Central Province
Muswaswa Sector	Kazumba Territory	Kasaï-Central Province
Tshitadi Sector	Kazumba Territory	Kasaï-Central Province
Bukanga-Lonzo Sector	Kenge Territory	Kwango Province
Dinga Sector	Kenge Territory	Kwango Province
Kolokoso Sector	Kenge Territory	Kwango Province
Mosamba Sector	Kenge Territory	Kwango Province
Pelende-Nord Chiefdom	Kenge Territory	Kwango Province
Benga Sector	Kimvula Territory	Kongo Central Province
Lubisi Sector	Kimvula Territory	Kongo Central Province
Lula-Lumene Sector	Kimvula Territory	Kongo Central Province
Ambwe Sector	Kailo Territory	Maniema Province
Balanga Sector	Kailo Territory	Maniema Province
Bangengele Chiefdom	Kailo Territory	Maniema Province
Wasongola Sector	Kailo Territory	Maniema Province
Aluba Chiefdom	Kibombo Territory	Maniema Province
Ankutshu Chiefdom	Kibombo Territory	Maniema Province
Bahina Chiefdom	Kibombo Territory	Maniema Province
Bakongola Chiefdom	Kibombo Territory	Maniema Province
Matapa Chiefdom	Kibombo Territory	Maniema Province
Bukanda Sector	Kipushi Territory	Haut-Katanga Province
Kaponda Chiefdom	Kipushi Territory	Haut-Katanga Province
Kinyama Chiefdom	Kipushi Territory	Haut-Katanga Province
Beronge Sector	Kiri Territory	Mai-Ndombe Province
Lutoy Sector	Kiri Territory	Mai-Ndombe Province
Pendjwa Sector	Kiri Territory	Mai-Ndombe Province
Atshuru Sector	Kole Territory	Sankuru Province
Bankutshu-Dibele Sector	Kole Territory	Sankuru Province
Bankutshu-Lukenie Sector	Kole Territory	Sankuru Province
Basho Sector	Kole Territory	Sankuru Province
Batetela-Dibele Sector	Kole Territory	Sankuru Province
Ohindo Sector	Kole Territory	Sankuru Province
Baluba Sector	Kongolo Territory	Tanganyika Province
Basonge Sector	Kongolo Territory	Tanganyika Province
Bayashi Chiefdom	Kongolo Territory	Tanganyika Province
Bena-Nyembo Chiefdom	Kongolo Territory	Tanganyika Province
Lubunda Chiefdom	Kongolo Territory	Tanganyika Province
Mambwe Chiefdom	Kongolo Territory	Tanganyika Province
Munono Chiefdom	Kongolo Territory	Tanganyika Province
Nkuvu Chiefdom	Kongolo Territory	Tanganyika Province
Yambula Chiefdom	Kongolo Territory	Tanganyika Province
Bomboma Sector	Kungu Territory	Sud-Ubangi Province
Dongo Sector	Kungu Territory	Sud-Ubangi Province
Lua Sector	Kungu Territory	Sud-Ubangi Province
Mwanda Sector	Kungu Territory	Sud-Ubangi Province
Songo Sector	Kungu Territory	Sud-Ubangi Province
Badia Chiefdom	Kutu Territory	Mai-Ndombe Province
Batere Chiefdom	Kutu Territory	Mai-Ndombe Province
Kemba Sector	Kutu Territory	Mai-Ndombe Province
Luabu Sector	Kutu Territory	Mai-Ndombe Province
Mfimi Sector	Kutu Territory	Mai-Ndombe Province
Bateke-Sud/TWA Sector	Kwamouth Territory	Mai-Ndombe Province
Bekalebwe Sector	Lubao Territory	Lomami Province
Kisengwa Sector	Lubao Territory	Lomami Province
Lubao Sector	Lubao Territory	Lomami Province
Tshofa Sector	Lubao Territory	Lomami Province
Libenge-Nord Sector	Libenge Territory	Sud-Ubangi Province
Libenge-Centre Sector	Libenge Territory	Sud-Ubangi Province
Libenge-Sud Sector	Libenge Territory	Sud-Ubangi Province
Mongala-Motima Sector	Lisala Territory	Mongala Province
Ngombe-Doko Sector	Lisala Territory	Mongala Province
Ngombe-Mombangi Sector	Lisala Territory	Mongala Province
Ahamba-Mange Sector	Lodja Territory	Sankuru Province
Batetela Lukenie Sector	Lodja Territory	Sankuru Province
Kondo-Tshumbe Sector	Lodja Territory	Sankuru Province
Lutshimba Sector	Lodja Territory	Sankuru Province
Lukfungu Sector	Lodja Territory	Sankuru Province
Nambelu-Luhembe Sector	Lodja Territory	Sankuru Province
Olemba Sector	Lodja Territory	Sankuru Province
Vungi Sector	Lodja Territory	Sankuru Province
Watambulu Sector	Lodja Territory	Sankuru Province
Bahamba I Sector	Lomela Territory	Sankuru Province
Bahamba II Sector	Lomela Territory	Sankuru Province
Bakela Sector	Lomela Territory	Sankuru Province
Batetela-Lomela Sector	Lomela Territory	Sankuru Province
Djonga Chiefdom	Lomela Territory	Sankuru Province
Okutu Sector	Lomela Territory	Sankuru Province
Basonge Sector	Lubefu Territory	Sankuru Province
Mondja-Ngandu Sector	Lubefu Territory	Sankuru Province
Ndjovu Sector	Lubefu Territory	Sankuru Province
Ngandu-Wuna Sector	Lubefu Territory	Sankuru Province
Bamate Chiefdom	Lubero Territory	North Kivu Province
Bapere Sector	Lubero Territory	North Kivu Province
Baswaga Chiefdom	Lubero Territory	North Kivu Province
Batangi Chiefdom	Lubero Territory	North Kivu Province
Bayeke Chiefdom	Lubudi Territory	Lualaba Province
Mazangule Chiefdom	Lubudi Territory	Lualaba Province
Mulumbu Chiefdom	Lubudi Territory	Lualaba Province
Mwana-Muadi Chiefdom	Lubudi Territory	Lualaba Province
Bitule Sector	Lubutu Territory	Maniema Province
Obokote Sector	Lubutu Territory	Maniema Province
Luebo-Kabambaie Sector	Luebo Territory	Kasaï Province
Luebo-Lulengele Sector	Luebo Territory	Kasaï Province
Luebo-Wedi Sector	Luebo Territory	Kasaï Province
Ndjoko-Punda Sector	Luebo Territory	Kasaï Province
Kanda-Kanda Sector	Luilu Territory	Lomami Province
Kanutshina Chiefdom	Luilu Territory	Lomami Province
Katshisungu Chiefdom	Luilu Territory	Lomami Province
Mulundu Chiefdom	Luilu Territory	Lomami Province
Bambaie Sector	Luiza Territory	Kasaï-Central Province
Bushimaie Sector	Luiza Territory	Kasaï-Central Province
Kabalekese Sector	Luiza Territory	Kasaï-Central Province
Kalunga Sector	Luiza Territory	Kasaï-Central Province
Loatshi Sector	Luiza Territory	Kasaï-Central Province
Lueta Sector	Luiza Territory	Kasaï-Central Province
Lusanza Sector	Luiza Territory	Kasaï-Central Province
Banunu Sector	Lukolela Territory	Équateur Province
Lusakani Sector	Lukolela Territory	Équateur Province
Mpama Sector	Lukolela Territory	Équateur Province
Fubu Sector	Lukula Territory	Kongo Central Province
Kakongo Sector	Lukula Territory	Kongo Central Province
Patu Sector	Lukula Territory	Kongo Central Province
Tsanga-Sud Sector	Lukula Territory	Kongo Central Province
Tsundi-Sud Sector	Lukula Territory	Kongo Central Province
Balari Sector	Luozi Territory	Kongo Central Province
Kenge Sector	Luozi Territory	Kongo Central Province
Kimbanza Sector	Luozi Territory	Kongo Central Province
Kimumba Sector	Luozi Territory	Kongo Central Province
Kinkenge Sector	Luozi Territory	Kongo Central Province
Kivunda Sector	Luozi Territory	Kongo Central Province
Mbanza Mona Sector	Luozi Territory	Kongo Central Province
Mbanza-Mwembe Sector	Luozi Territory	Kongo Central Province
Mbanza Ngoyo Sector	Luozi Territory	Kongo Central Province
Mongo Luala Sector	Luozi Territory	Kongo Central Province
Kabala Sector	Lupatapata Territory	Kasaï-Oriental Province
Mudiba Sector	Lupatapata Territory	Kasaï-Oriental Province
Mukumbi Sector	Lupatapata Territory	Kasaï-Oriental Province
Mulenda Sector	Lupatapata Territory	Kasaï-Oriental Province
Batetela Sector	Lusambo Territory	Sankuru Province
Basonge Sector	Lusambo Territory	Sankuru Province
Entre Kunduye Mal Sector	Lusambo Territory	Sankuru Province
Entre Lubi Kunduye Sector	Lusambo Territory	Sankuru Province
Kashindi Sector	Lusambo Territory	Sankuru Province
Lubi Sector	Lusambo Territory	Sankuru Province
Pania-Mutombo Sector	Lusambo Territory	Sankuru Province
Sankuru Sector	Lusambo Territory	Sankuru Province
Luidi Sector	Madimba Territory	Kongo Central Province
Mfidi Malele Sector	Madimba Territory	Kongo Central Province
Mfuma Kibambi Sector	Madimba Territory	Kongo Central Province
Ngeba Sector	Madimba Territory	Kongo Central Province
Ngufu Sector	Madimba Territory	Kongo Central Province
Wungu Sector	Madimba Territory	Kongo Central Province
Alur-Djuganda Chiefdom	Mahagi Territory	Ituri Province
Anghal 1 & 2 Chiefdom	Mahagi Territory	Ituri Province
Djukoth 1 & 2 Chiefdom	Mahagi Territory	Ituri Province
Mokambo Chiefdom	Mahagi Territory	Ituri Province
Pandoro Chiefdom	Mahagi Territory	Ituri Province
Walendu Watsi Chiefdom	Mahagi Territory	Ituri Province
Wangongo Chiefdom	Mahagi Territory	Ituri Province
War-Palara Sector	Mahagi Territory	Ituri Province
Badia Sector	Malemba-Nkulu Territory	Haut-Lomami Province
Kayumba Chiefdom	Malemba-Nkulu Territory	Haut-Lomami Province
Mulongo Chiefdom	Malemba-Nkulu Territory	Haut-Lomami Province
Museka Chiefdom	Malemba-Nkulu Territory	Haut-Lomami Province
Mwanza Sector	Malemba-Nkulu Territory	Haut-Lomami Province
Nkulu Chiefdom	Malemba-Nkulu Territory	Haut-Lomami Province
Bombo Chiefdom	Mambasa Territory	Ituri Province
Bandaka Chiefdom	Mambasa Territory	Ituri Province
Babila-Babombi Chiefdom	Mambasa Territory	Ituri Province
Mambasa Chiefdom	Mambasa Territory	Ituri Province
Walese-Dese Chiefdom	Mambasa Territory	Ituri Province
Walese-Karo Chiefdom	Mambasa Territory	Ituri Province
Bakwanza Chiefdom	Mambasa Territory	Ituri Province
Bangala Sector	Mankanza Territory	Équateur Province
Mweko Sector	Mankanza Territory	Équateur Province
Ndobo Sector	Mankanza Territory	Équateur Province
Bakongolo Chiefdom	Manono Territory	Tanganyika Province
Kamalondo Chiefdom	Manono Territory	Tanganyika Province
Kiluba Chiefdom	Manono Territory	Tanganyika Province
Kyofwe Sector	Manono Territory	Tanganyika Province
Luvua Sector	Manono Territory	Tanganyika Province
Niemba Sector	Manono Territory	Tanganyika Province
Bindungi Sector	Masi-Manimba Territory	Kwilu Province
Kibolo Sector	Masi-Manimba Territory	Kwilu Province
Kinzenga Sector	Masi-Manimba Territory	Kwilu Province
Kinzenzengo Sector	Masi-Manimba Territory	Kwilu Province
Kitoy Sector	Masi-Manimba Territory	Kwilu Province
Masi-Manimba Sector	Masi-Manimba Territory	Kwilu Province
Mokamo Sector	Masi-Manimba Territory	Kwilu Province
Mosango Sector	Masi-Manimba Territory	Kwilu Province
Pay-Kongila Sector	Masi-Manimba Territory	Kwilu Province
Sungu Sector	Masi-Manimba Territory	Kwilu Province
Bahunde Chiefdom	Masisi Territory	North Kivu Province
Bashali Chiefdom	Masisi Territory	North Kivu Province
Osso Sector	Masisi Territory	North Kivu Province
Katoyi Sector	Masisi Territory	North Kivu Province
Boko Sector	Mbanza-Ngungu Territory	Kongo Central Province
Gombe-Matadi Sector	Mbanza-Ngungu Territory	Kongo Central Province
Gombe-Sud Sector	Mbanza-Ngungu Territory	Kongo Central Province
Kivulu Sector	Mbanza-Ngungu Territory	Kongo Central Province
Kwilu-Ngongo Sector	Mbanza-Ngungu Territory	Kongo Central Province
Lunzadi Sector	Mbanza-Ngungu Territory	Kongo Central Province
Ntimansi Sector	Mbanza-Ngungu Territory	Kongo Central Province
Kakangayi Sector	Miabi Territory	Kasaï-Oriental Province
Movo-Nkatshia Sector	Miabi Territory	Kasaï-Oriental Province
Tshijiba Sector	Miabi Territory	Kasaï-Oriental Province
Tshilundu Sector	Miabi Territory	Kasaï-Oriental Province
Balomotwa Sector	Mitwaba Territory	Haut-Katanga Province
Banweshi Sector	Mitwaba Territory	Haut-Katanga Province
Kiona-Ngoie Chiefdom	Mitwaba Territory	Haut-Katanga Province
Assolongo Sector	Moanda Territory	Kongo Central Province
Boma-Bungu Sector	Moanda Territory	Kongo Central Province
La Mer Sector	Moanda Territory	Kongo Central Province
Bena-Kamanya Sector	Moba Territory	Tanganyika Province
Bena-Tanga Chiefdom	Moba Territory	Tanganyika Province
Kansabala Chiefdom	Moba Territory	Tanganyika Province
Kayabala Chiefdom	Moba Territory	Tanganyika Province
Manda Chiefdom	Moba Territory	Tanganyika Province
Nganye Chiefdom	Moba Territory	Tanganyika Province
Otto-Banza Sector	Mobayi-Mbongo Territory	Nord-Ubangi Province
Mobayi-Mbongo Sector	Mobayi-Mbongo Territory	Nord-Ubangi Province
Bianga Sector	Monkoto Territory	Tshuapa Province
Monkoto Sector	Monkoto Territory	Tshuapa Province
Nongo Sector	Monkoto Territory	Tshuapa Province
Baboma-Nord Chiefdom	Mushie Territory	Mai-Ndombe Province
Lufupa Sector	Mutshatsha Territory	Lualaba Province
Luilu Sector	Mutshatsha Territory	Lualaba Province
Mukuleshi Sector	Mutshatsha Territory	Lualaba Province
Bakuba Chiefdom	Mweka Territory	Kasaï Province
Basile Chiefdom	Mwenga Territory	South Kivu Province
Burhinyi Chiefdom	Mwenga Territory	South Kivu Province
Luindi Chiefdom	Mwenga Territory	South Kivu Province
Luwindja Chiefdom	Mwenga Territory	South Kivu Province
Itombwe Sector	Mwenga Territory	South Kivu Province
Wamuzima Chiefdom	Mwenga Territory	South Kivu Province
Baluba-Shankadi Sector	Ngandajika Territory	Lomami Province
Bakwa Mulumba Chiefdom	Ngandajika Territory	Lomami Province
Gandajika Sector	Ngandajika Territory	Lomami Province
Kalambayi Chiefdom	Ngandajika Territory	Lomami Province
Tshiyamba Sector	Ngandajika Territory	Lomami Province
Boemi Chiefdom	Niangara Territory	Haut-Uélé Province
Mangbetu-Mabisanga Chiefdom	Niangara Territory	Haut-Uélé Province
Mangbele Chiefdom	Niangara Territory	Haut-Uélé Province
Manziga Chiefdom	Niangara Territory	Haut-Uélé Province
Okondo Chiefdom	Niangara Territory	Haut-Uélé Province
Kereboro Chiefdom	Niangara Territory	Haut-Uélé Province
Kopa Chiefdom	Niangara Territory	Haut-Uélé Province
Bukumu Chiefdom	Nyiragongo Territory	North Kivu Province
Nord-Lukuga Sector	Nyunzu Territory	Tanganyika Province
Sud-Lukuga Sector	Nyunzu Territory	Tanganyika Province
Balinga-Lindja Sector	Opala Territory	Tshopo Province
Yawende-Loolo Sector	Opala Territory	Tshopo Province
Yeyango Chiefdom	Opala Territory	Tshopo Province
Yomale Chiefdom	Opala Territory	Tshopo Province
Yalingo Chiefdom	Opala Territory	Tshopo Province
Iye Sector	Opala Territory	Tshopo Province
Yapandu Chiefdom	Opala Territory	Tshopo Province
Mongo Chiefdom	Opala Territory	Tshopo Province
Kembe Chiefdom	Opala Territory	Tshopo Province
Lobaie Sector	Opala Territory	Tshopo Province
Tooli Sector	Opala Territory	Tshopo Province
Entre Lukenie-Lokoro Nkaw Sector	Oshwe Territory	Mai-Ndombe Province
Kangara Sector	Oshwe Territory	Mai-Ndombe Province
Lokolama Sector	Oshwe Territory	Mai-Ndombe Province
Lukenie Sector	Oshwe Territory	Mai-Ndombe Province
Babene Chiefdom	Pangi Territory	Maniema Province
Beia Sector	Pangi Territory	Maniema Province
Ikama Sector	Pangi Territory	Maniema Province
Wakabango Sector	Pangi Territory	Maniema Province
Abarambo Sector	Poko Territory	Bas-Uélé Province
Babena Chiefdom	Poko Territory	Bas-Uélé Province
Bakengaie Chiefdom	Poko Territory	Bas-Uélé Province
Gamu Chiefdom	Poko Territory	Bas-Uélé Province
Kembisa Sector	Poko Territory	Bas-Uélé Province
Kipate Chiefdom	Poko Territory	Bas-Uélé Province
Kumendeni Chiefdom	Poko Territory	Bas-Uélé Province
Mabanga Chiefdom	Poko Territory	Bas-Uélé Province
Madi Chiefdom	Poko Territory	Bas-Uélé Province
Malele Chiefdom	Poko Territory	Bas-Uélé Province
Ngbaradi Chiefdom	Poko Territory	Bas-Uélé Province
Soronga Chiefdom	Poko Territory	Bas-Uélé Province
Zune Chiefdom	Poko Territory	Bas-Uélé Province
Lufuna Sector	Popokabaka Territory	Kwango Province
Popokabaka Sector	Popokabaka Territory	Kwango Province
Yonso Sector	Popokabaka Territory	Kwango Province
Babira Bakwame Sector	Punia Territory	Maniema Province
Baleka Sector	Punia Territory	Maniema Province
Ulindi Sector	Punia Territory	Maniema Province
Kiona-Nzini Chiefdom	Pweto Territory	Haut-Katanga Province
Moero Sector	Pweto Territory	Haut-Katanga Province
Mwenge Sector	Pweto Territory	Haut-Katanga Province
Pweto Chiefdom	Pweto Territory	Haut-Katanga Province
Azanga Chiefdom	Rungu Territory	Haut-Uélé Province
Mayogo-Mabozo Chiefdom	Rungu Territory	Haut-Uélé Province
Mayogo-Magbay Chiefdom	Rungu Territory	Haut-Uélé Province
Mboli Chiefdom	Rungu Territory	Haut-Uélé Province
Medje-Mango Chiefdom	Rungu Territory	Haut-Uélé Province
Mongo-Masi Chiefdom	Rungu Territory	Haut-Uélé Province
Ndey Chiefdom	Rungu Territory	Haut-Uélé Province
Bwito Chiefdom	Rutshuru Territory	North Kivu Province
Bwisha Chiefdom	Rutshuru Territory	North Kivu Province
Balala Sector	Sakania Territory	Haut-Katanga Province
Balamba Sector	Sakania Territory	Haut-Katanga Province
Baushi-Mwenda Sector	Sakania Territory	Haut-Katanga Province
Kayembe-Mukulu Chiefdom	Sandoa Territory	Lualaba Province
Lumanga Chiefdom	Sandoa Territory	Lualaba Province
Mbako Chiefdom	Sandoa Territory	Lualaba Province
Muteba Chiefdom	Sandoa Territory	Lualaba Province
Sakundundu Chiefdom	Sandoa Territory	Lualaba Province
Samutoma Chiefdom	Sandoa Territory	Lualaba Province
Tshibamba Chiefdom	Sandoa Territory	Lualaba Province
Tshipao Chiefdom	Sandoa Territory	Lualaba Province
Bundi Sector	Seke-Banza Territory	Kongo Central Province
Isangila Sector	Seke-Banza Territory	Kongo Central Province
Lufu Sector	Seke-Banza Territory	Kongo Central Province
Mbavu Sector	Seke-Banza Territory	Kongo Central Province
Sumbi Sector	Seke-Banza Territory	Kongo Central Province
Bakisi Chiefdom	Shabunda Territory	South Kivu Province
Wakabango Chiefdom	Shabunda Territory	South Kivu Province
Bamboma Sector	Songololo Territory	Kongo Central Province
Kimpese Sector	Songololo Territory	Kongo Central Province
Luima Sector	Songololo Territory	Kongo Central Province
Palabala Sector	Songololo Territory	Kongo Central Province
Wombo Sector	Songololo Territory	Kongo Central Province
Bula-Naku Sector	Tshela Territory	Kongo Central Province
Lubolo Sector	Tshela Territory	Kongo Central Province
Lubuzi Sector	Tshela Territory	Kongo Central Province
Loango Sector	Tshela Territory	Kongo Central Province
Maduda Sector	Tshela Territory	Kongo Central Province
Ngana-Sundi Sector	Tshela Territory	Kongo Central Province
Nzobe-Luzi Sector	Tshela Territory	Kongo Central Province
Tshela-Banga Sector	Tshela Territory	Kongo Central Province
Bakwa-Nyambi Sector	Kamonia Territory	Kasaï Province
Bapende Sector	Kamonia Territory	Kasaï Province
Kasadisadi Sector	Kamonia Territory	Kasaï Province
Kasai-Kabambaie Sector	Kamonia Territory	Kasaï Province
Kasai-Lunyeka Sector	Kamonia Territory	Kasaï Province
Kasai-Longatshimo Sector	Kamonia Territory	Kasaï Province
Lovua-Longatshimo Sector	Kamonia Territory	Kasaï Province
Lovua-Lutshiku Sector	Kamonia Territory	Kasaï Province
Tshikapa Sector	Kamonia Territory	Kasaï Province
Kalelu Sector	Tshilenge Territory	Kasaï-Oriental Province
Kalondji-Sud Sector	Tshilenge Territory	Kasaï-Oriental Province
Kampatshi Chiefdom	Tshilenge Territory	Kasaï-Oriental Province
Lukalaba Sector	Tshilenge Territory	Kasaï-Oriental Province
Tshipuka Sector	Tshilenge Territory	Kasaï-Oriental Province
Bakumu-Kilinga Sector	Ubundu Territory	Tshopo Province
Bakumu-Mandombe Sector	Ubundu Territory	Tshopo Province
Bakumu-Mangongo Sector	Ubundu Territory	Tshopo Province
Bakumu-d'Obiatuku Sector	Ubundu Territory	Tshopo Province
Kirundu Chiefdom	Ubundu Territory	Tshopo Province
Mituku-Bamoya Sector	Ubundu Territory	Tshopo Province
Mituku-Basikate Sector	Ubundu Territory	Tshopo Province
Walengola-Babira Sector	Ubundu Territory	Tshopo Province
Walengola-Baleka Sector	Ubundu Territory	Tshopo Province
Walengola Lilo Sector	Ubundu Territory	Tshopo Province
Walengola Lowa Sector	Ubundu Territory	Tshopo Province
Bafuliiru Chiefdom	Uvira Territory	South Kivu Province
Bavira Chiefdom	Uvira Territory	South Kivu Province
Plaine de la Ruzizi Chiefdom	Uvira Territory	South Kivu Province
Wanianga Sector	Walikale Territory	North Kivu Province
Bakano Sector	Walikale Territory	North Kivu Province
Kaziba Chiefdom	Walungu Territory	South Kivu Province
Ngweshe Chiefdom	Walungu Territory	South Kivu Province
Mabudu-Malika-Baberu Chiefdom	Wamba Territory	Haut-Uélé Province
Bafwakoy Chiefdom	Wamba Territory	Haut-Uélé Province
Balika-Toriko Chiefdom	Wamba Territory	Haut-Uélé Province
Malika Chiefdom	Wamba Territory	Haut-Uélé Province
Bafwagada Chiefdom	Wamba Territory	Haut-Uélé Province
Wadimbisa-Mabudu Chiefdom	Wamba Territory	Haut-Uélé Province
Timoniko Chiefdom	Wamba Territory	Haut-Uélé Province
Makoda Chiefdom	Wamba Territory	Haut-Uélé Province
Mangbele Chiefdom	Wamba Territory	Haut-Uélé Province
Malamba Chiefdom	Wamba Territory	Haut-Uélé Province
Maha Chiefdom	Wamba Territory	Haut-Uélé Province
Andobi Chiefdom	Watsa Territory	Haut-Uélé Province
Kebo Chiefdom	Watsa Territory	Haut-Uélé Province
Ateru Chiefdom	Watsa Territory	Haut-Uélé Province
Andikofa Chiefdom	Watsa Territory	Haut-Uélé Province
Gombari Sector	Watsa Territory	Haut-Uélé Province
Mari-Minza Chiefdom	Watsa Territory	Haut-Uélé Province
Walese Chiefdom	Watsa Territory	Haut-Uélé Province
Mangbutu Sector	Watsa Territory	Haut-Uélé Province
Kibali Sector	Watsa Territory	Haut-Uélé Province
Bolinga Sector	Yahuma Territory	Tshopo Province
Bosoku Sector	Yahuma Territory	Tshopo Province
Buma Sector	Yahuma Territory	Tshopo Province
Mombesa Chiefdom	Yahuma Territory	Tshopo Province
Abumombazi Sector	Yakoma Territory	Nord-Ubangi Province
Wapinda Sector	Yakoma Territory	Nord-Ubangi Province
Yakoma Sector	Yakoma Territory	Nord-Ubangi Province
Mongama Sector	Yumbi Territory	Mai-Ndombe Province
