= Watsa =

- Location within Democratic Republic of the Congo
- Coordinates: 3.03716°N 29.53551°E
- Country: Democratic Republic of the Congo
- Province: Haut-Uele
- Territory: Watsa Territory
- Climate: Am
- National language: Lingala

Watsa is a community in the Haut-Uele Province of the Democratic Republic of the Congo, administrative center of the Watsa Territory. It is served by Watsa Airport, a grass airstrip 4 kilometres (2.5 mi) south of the town.

Watsa was the location of the VI battalion of the Force Publique in the 1940s and 1950s.

Between 1998 and 2000, co-circulating Marburg virus and Ravn virus caused 154 cases of Marburg virus disease and 128 deaths among illegal gold miners in Watsa and the nearby Durba Mine. In January and February 2011 the Lords Resistance Army attacked people in the territories of Dungu, Faradje, Niangara and Watsa, causing 33,000 people to be displaced. They were slow to return due to the feeble response of government security forces.

== Climate ==
Köppen-Geiger climate classification system classifies its climate as tropical monsoon (Am).

Climate data for Watsa
Month	Jan	Feb	Mar	Apr	May	Jun	Jul	Aug	Sep	Oct	Nov	Dec	Year
Mean daily maximum °C (°F)	30.8 (87.4)	31.1 (88.0)	30.5 (86.9)	29.6 (85.3)	28.7 (83.7)	27.8 (82.0)	26.6 (79.9)	26.7 (80.1)	27.7 (81.9)	28.5 (83.3)	29.5 (85.1)	30.2 (86.4)	29.0 (84.2)
Daily mean °C (°F)	24.2 (75.6)	24.5 (76.1)	24.4 (75.9)	24 (75)	23.3 (73.9)	22.7 (72.9)	22 (72)	21.9 (71.4)	22.3 (72.1)	22.9 (73.2)	23.5 (74.3)	23.9 (75.0)	23.3 (74.0)
Mean daily minimum °C (°F)	17.7 (63.9)	18 (64)	18.3 (64.9)	18.4 (65.1)	18 (64)	17.6 (63.7)	17.4 (63.3)	17.2 (63.0)	17 (63)	17.3 (63.1)	17.5 (63.5)	17.6 (63.7)	17.7 (63.8)
Average precipitation mm (inches)	45 (1.8)	57 (2.2)	122 (4.8)	196 (7.7)	193 (7.6)	179 (7.0)	184 (7.2)	234 (9.2)	201 (7.9)	213 (8.4)	126 (5.0)	50 (2.0)	1,800 (70.8)
Source: Climate-Data.org (altitude: 1022m)
