= Luama River =

River in Democratic Republic of the Congo

- The Lualaba River, in red

Location
- Country: Democratic Republic of the Congo

Physical characteristics
- Mouth
  - location: Lualaba River in Maniema province
  - coordinates: 4.7579°S 26.8814°E

The Luama River (Swahili: Mto Luama) is a tributary of the Lualaba River in the Democratic Republic of the Congo (DRC).

== Location ==
The Luama rises in the mountains to the west of Lake Tanganyika, in the Kalemie Territory of Tanganyika District. It flows north and northwest into Kabambare Territory of Maniema, then turns to the southwest, entering the Lualaba above Kasongo. The river has five sources in the mountains, two of which are above 2,000 metres (6,600 ft) in altitude. The headwater regions upstream of Pene Mende include a system of wetlands about 130 kilometres (81 mi) in length and covering about 60,000 hectares (150,000 acres). Below these wetlands the river drops down three waterfalls and includes several minor rapids. The Luama enters the Lualaba from the east after the rapids below Kangolo and just before the Lualaba turns northwest in the stretch above Kibombo.

The Luama River defines the southern boundary of the range of eastern gorillas, which is bounded by the Lualaba river to the west, the Albertine rift to the east and the Lindi River to the north.

== European exploration ==
The explorer Henry Morton Stanley visited the river in October 1876. He said of the people: "They are tolerably hospitable, and permit strangers the free use of their dwellings. The bananas and plantains are very luxuriant, while the Guinea palms supply the people with oil and wine; the forests give them fuel, the rivers fish, and the gardens cassava, groundnuts, and Indian corn". He said of the lower reaches of the river that as far as the Lualaba the current was from three to six knots and the river was about 5 feet (1.5 m) deep, with a shaly bed. Stanley followed the river down to the Lualaba, and then followed the Lualaba downstream as it curved away to the west, determining that it was not the Nile as David Livingstone had surmised, but was the upper part of the Congo River.

The Arab war in the Congo Free State was concluded by a victory by the Force Publique led by Dhanis and Pnthier on the Luama River on 20 October 1893.

== Sources ==
- Blaes, X. (October 2008). "Découpage administratif de la République Démocratique du Congo" (PDF). PNUD-SIG. Archived from the original (PDF) on 2010-04-01.
- Hughes, R. H.; Hughes, J. S. (1992). A directory of African wetlands. IUCN. ISBN 2-88032-949-3.
- O'Brien, Gerard (2008). A Mighty Big River. Lulu.com. ISBN 978-1-4092-1802-9.
- Stanley, Henry Morton (1878). Through the Dark continent: or, The sources of the Nile around the great lakes of equatorial Africa, and down the Livingstone river to the Atlantic ocean. Harper.
- Taylor, Andrea Beth; Goldsmith, Michele Lynn (2003). Gorilla biology: a multidisciplinary perspective. Cambridge University Press. ISBN 0-521-79281-9.
- Vandervort, Bruce (1998). Wars of imperial conquest in Africa, 1830-1914. Indiana University Press. ISBN 0-253-21178-6.
