= Lele language (Bantu) =

Bantu language spoken in DR Congo

Lele
- Native to: Democratic Republic of the Congo
- Ethnicity: Lele people
- Native speakers: (26,000 cited 1971)
- Language family: Niger–Congo?: Atlantic–Congo; Volta-Congo; Benue–Congo; Bantoid; Southern Bantoid; Bantu (Zone C); Bushoong languages (C.80); Lele

Language codes
- ISO 639-3: lel
- Glottolog: lele1265
- Guthrie code: C.84

Lele (also called Bashilele or Usilele) is a Bantu language belonging to the Bushoong group of languages. It is spoken mainly in the west edge of Kasaï Province, in Ilebo and Tshikapa territories; the extreme east of Kwilu Province, in Idiofa and Gungu territories of the Democratic Republic of the Congo.
