= Bulungu, Kasai-Central =

Town and sector in the Kasaï-Central Province of the Democratic Republic of the Congo

Bulungu
- Sector
- Location within Democratic Republic of the Congo
- Coordinates: 6°4′S 21°54′E
- Country: DR Congo
- Province: Kasaï-Central
- Territory: Kazumba

Population (2009)
  - Total: 54,424
- Time zone: UTC+2 (Central Africa Time)
- Climate: Aw

Bulungu (or Mbulungu) is a town and sector in Kasai-Central province of southern Democratic Republic of the Congo. It is part of the Kazumba Territory.
