= Ango Territory =

- Territory
- Interactive map of Ango Territory
- Coordinates: 4°0′N 26°0′E
- Country: Democratic Republic of Congo
- Province: Bas-Uele

Area
  - Total: 34,734 km^{2} (13,411 sq mi)

Population (2015)
  - Total: 153,117
  - Density: 4.4083/km^{2} (11.417/sq mi)
- Time zone: UTC+2 (CAT)
- National language: Lingala

Ango Territory is a territory in the Bas-Uele Province of the Democratic Republic of the Congo. The administrative capital is located at Ango. The territory borders Bondo Territory to the west, Central African Republic to the north, Bambesa Territory to the southwest, Poko Territory to the southeast and Dungu Territory in Haut-Uele Province to the east.

== Subdivisions ==
The territory contains the following chiefdoms:

- Ezo Chiefdom
- Mopoi Chiefdom
- Ngindo Chiefdom
- Sasa Chiefdom
