= Faradje =

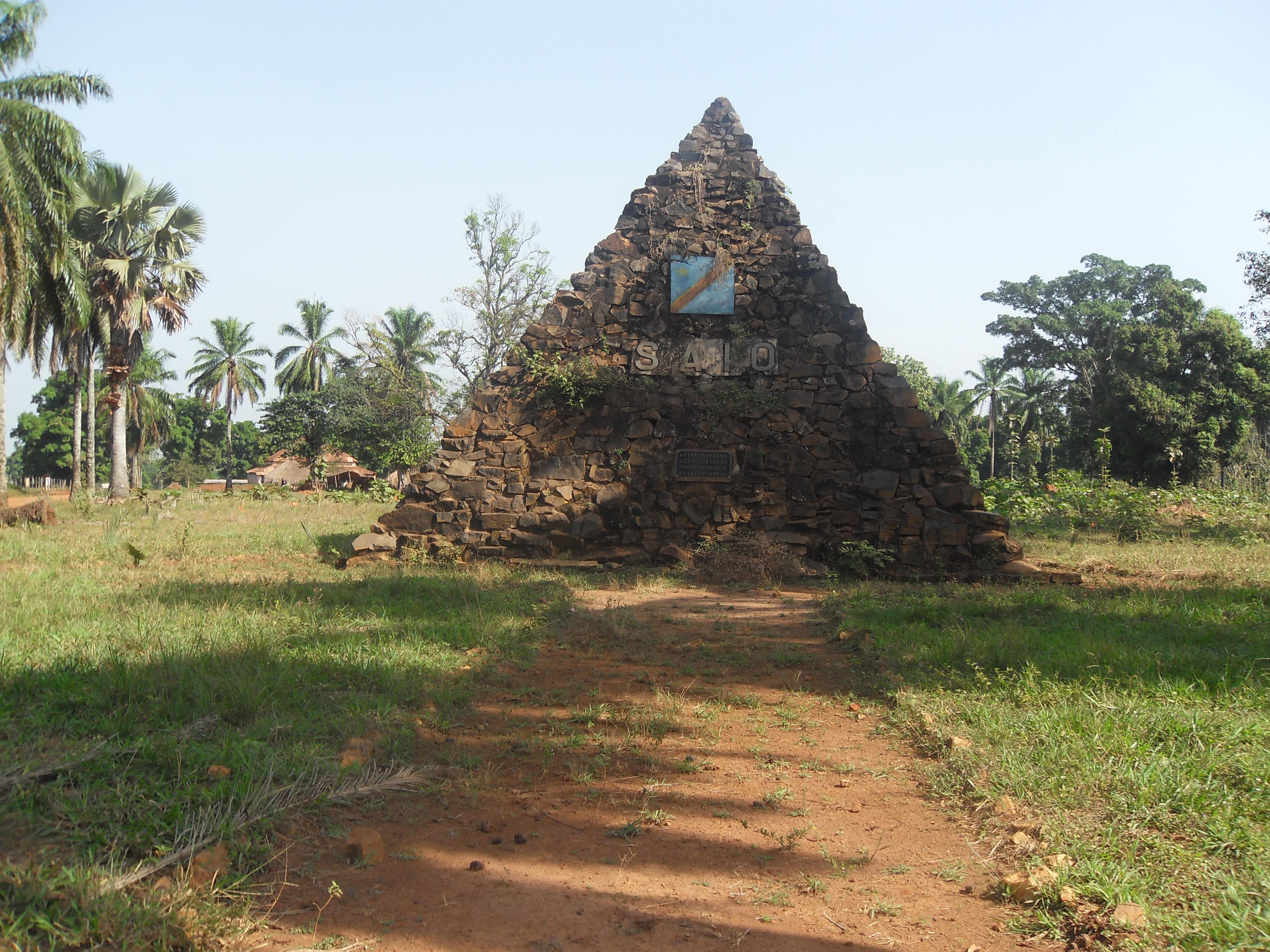
- Memorial to Congolese participation in the East African Campaign during World War II in Faradje

- Location within Democratic Republic of the Congo
- Coordinates: 3.73503°N 29.70997°E
- Country: Democratic Republic of Congo
- Province: Haut-Uele
- Territory: Faradje
- Climate: Aw
- National Language: Lingala

Faradje is a town in the Haut-Uele province of the Democratic Republic of the Congo and is the administrative center of Faradje Territory. It lies on the Dungu River.

It had a population of about 25,000 in 2009. It has dirt streets, a police station and a market. There is a small airstrip (code FZJK). It lies at an elevation of 2,690 feet (820 m) above sea level.

== History ==
=== Lord's Resistance Army presence in the area ===
On 25 December 2008, rebels in the Lord's Resistance Army (LRA), fleeing from a multinational military offensive, struck Faradje, killing 40 people. The LRA also attacked the villages of Doruma and Durba in the next two days, killing another 149 people. Most of the victims were women and children, who were cut into pieces. In January and February 2011 the Lord's Resistance Army again attacked people in the territories of Dungu, Faradje, Niangara and Watsa, causing 33,000 people to be displaced. The people were slow to return due to the feeble response of government security forces.
