= Moba Territory =

Moba Territory Wilaya ya Moba (Swahili)
- Interactive map of Moba Territory
- Coordinates: 7.03982°S 29.766147°E
- Country: DR Congo
- Province: Tanganyika

Area
  - Total: 24,500 km^{2} (9,500 sq mi)

Population (2015)
  - Total: 609,406
  - Density: 24.9/km^{2} (64.4/sq mi)
- Time zone: UTC+2 (CAT)

Moba Territory is a territory in the Tanganyika Province of the Democratic Republic of the Congo. The administrative center is Moba port. The territory has an estimated area of 24,500 square kilometres (9,500 sq mi) and a population of almost 610,000.

== History ==
The territory has been damaged by a series of rebellions and civil wars, the last being the Second Congo War (1998-2003). Since then the destroyed or damages villages are slowly being rebuilt. On 1 August 2007 a mob of demonstrators assaulted United Nations military observers and damaged offices belonging to the UNHCR and sister agencies. The United Nations withdrew from the town and ceased repatriation of refugees living in Zambia. After the situation stabilized and the UN was able to return, it was expected that the great majority of the 43,000 Congolese refugees who were still living in Zambian camps would return home to Moba territory.

In December 2024, Mai Mai Kata Katanga rebels attacked four villages and burned over 50 houses in Moba Territory, causing around 4,000 civilians to flee.

== Geography and climate ==
The west of the territory is bounded by Lake Tanganyika and the south by Zambia. To the north is Kalemie Territory and to the east Manono Territory and Pweto Territory. Rivers flowing through the territory include the Mulobozi River, Lufako River, Mulondi River, Lunangwa River and the Tshama River. Moba-Port has a tropical climate, with a dry season from June to August. Temperatures range from around 70 °F (21 °C) to 90 °F (32 °C), but may fall as low as 50 °F (10 °C) in June or July. Inland and at higher elevations the climate is cooler.

=== Subdivisions ===
The territory contains the following chiefdoms or sectors:

- Bena-Kamanya Sector
- Bena-Tanga Chiefdom
- Kansabala Chiefdom
- Kayabala Chiefdom
- Manda Chiefdom

== Economy ==
Lake Tanganyika is of great importance as a source of fish. The land is rich is minerals. Gold is mined on a small scale, and copper, iron and diamonds have yet to be exploited. The soil is fertile. Crops include corn, beans, cassava, potato, wheat, rice, sweet potatoes, sorghum, coffee, Eleusine, onions, garlic, peas, peanut, tomato, banana, sugarcane, different types of fruit trees and palm oil. Road communications are poor. Few people have television and none have internet access.

== Health and education ==
There are five secondary schools for the territory, specializing in biochemistry, fishing, business, and teaching. All schools are poorly equipped. Kirungu has a College of Rural Development.
