= Faradje Territory =

- Interactive map of Faradje Territory
- Coordinates: 3.73503°N 29.70997°E
- Country: DR Congo
- Province: Haut-Uele

Area
  - Total: 13,138 km^{2} (5,073 sq mi)

Population (2020)
  - Total: 607,845
  - Density: 46.266/km^{2} (119.83/sq mi)
- Time zone: UTC+2 (CAT)

Faradje Territory is an administrative area in the Haut-Uele Province of the Democratic Republic of the Congo. The main town is Faradje, lying on the Dungu River.

In January and February 2011 the Lords Resistance Army attacked people in the territories of Dungu, Faradje, Niangara and Watsa, causing 33,000 people to be displaced. The people were slow to return due to the feeble response of government security forces.
