= Nangazizi =

- Town
- Location within Democratic Republic of the Congo
- Coordinates: 3.0442°N 27.7698°E
- Country: Democratic Republic of the Congo
- Province: Haut-Uélé
- Territory: Rungu Territory
- Elevation: 736 m (2,415 ft)
- Area codes: for multiple area codes

Nangazizi is a settlement in the province of Haut-Uélé in the Democratic Republic of the Congo.

== Location ==
Nangazizi is in the Azanga chiefdom of the Rungu Territory in Haut-Uélé. Niangara is further to the north on the Uele River. It is on the RP426 highway between Isiro to the southwest and Rungu to the north on the Bomokandi River. The elevation is 736 metres (2,415 ft). The Köppen climate classification is "Aw": Tropical savanna, wet.

The Mangbetu language is spoken in Nangazizi and Rungu.

== History ==
On 1 May 1872 the Italian explorer Giovanni Miani arrived at Nangazizi, the base of chief Mbunza, where he rested until 25 May 1872. In the second half of November that year Miani's expedition returned to Nangazizi. Miani died there on 21 November 1872 from a combination of fatigue, dysentery and necrosis of the arm. He was buried there, but his tomb was soon dug up again by the local people. Later Romolo Gessi managed to obtain the bones, which were given to the Italian Geographic Society.

== Sources ==
- Blaes, X. (October 2008), Découpage administratif de la République Démocratique du Congo (PDF) (in French), PNUD-SIG, archived from the original (PDF) on 2010-04-01
- Demolin, Didier (1992), Le Mangbetu: etude phonétique et phonologique (dissertation) (in French), vol. 1–2, Brussels: Faculté de Philosophie et Lettres, Université libre de Bruxelles
- "Nangazizi, Haut Uele, Democratic Republic of the Congo", Mindat.org
- "Nangazizi", Mapcarta
- Omasombo Tshonda, Jean (2011), Haut-Uele : Trésor (PDF) (in French), Musée royal de l’Afrique centrale, ISBN 978-2-8710-6578-4
- Surdich, Franceso (2010), "Miani, Giovanni", Dizionario biografico degli italiani, vol. 74, pp. 100–104
- "Town Nangazizi, Upper Uele, Democratic Republic of the Congo", OpenStreetMap
