= Kabeya =

Kabeya is a surname. Notable people with the surname include:

- Christian Tshimanga Kabeya (born 1987), Belgian footballer
- Guy Kabeya Muya (born 1970), DR Congolese filmmaker
- Jean-Claude Mukanya (born 1968), Swiss footballer
- Sadia Kabeya (born 2002), English rugby player

== See also ==
- Kabeya-Kamwanga, city
