= Aru, Democratic Republic of the Congo =

Aru
- Commune
- Location in the Democratic Republic of the Congo
- Coordinates: 2°51′42″N 30°50′00″E
- Country: DR Congo
- Province: Ituri
- Territory: Aru

Population (2004)
  - Total: 26,290
- Time zone: UTC+2 (CAT)
- Climate: Aw
- National language: Swahili

Aru is a town and the seat of Aru Territory in the Ituri Province of the Democratic Republic of the Congo. In 2004 its population was estimated to be 26,290. Aru has a small airport but no public electricity grid as of 2010.
