= Faradje Airport =

- IATA: none; ICAO: FZJK

Summary
- Airport type: Public
- Serves: Faradje, Democratic Republic of the Congo
- Elevation AMSL: 2,690 ft / 820 m
- Coordinates: 3°42′55″N 29°42′45″E

Map
- Location of airport in the Democratic Republic of the Congo

Runways
Direction	Length		Surface
Direction	m	ft	Surface
17/35	1,050	3,445	Dirt
- Source: Google Maps GCM

Faradje Airport (ICAO: FZJK) is an airport serving the town of Faradje, Haut-Uélé Province, Democratic Republic of the Congo.

== See also ==
- Transport in the Democratic Republic of the Congo
- List of airports in the Democratic Republic of the Congo
