= Kabeya-Kamwanga =

City of the Democratic Republic of the Congo

- Commune
- Commune de Kabeya-Kamwanga
- Location within Democratic Republic of the Congo
- Coordinates: 6.00°S 23.25°E
- Country: DR Congo
- Province: Kasaï-Oriental
- Territory: Kabeya-Kamwanga

Population (2012)
  - Total: 31,408

Kabeya-Kamwanga is a town of the Democratic Republic of the Congo and is the administrative center of Kabeya-Kamwanga territory of Kasaï-Oriental province. As of 2012, it had an estimated population of 31,408.
