= Luozi =

- Location within Democratic Republic of the Congo
- Coordinates: 4.948°S 14.133°E
- Country: Democratic Republic of the Congo
- Province: Bas-Congo
- District: Cataractes
- Territory: Luozi Territory

Population (2012 estimate)
  - Total: 13,855

Luozi is a community in Kongo Central province of the Democratic Republic of the Congo. It is the seat of the Luozi Territory within Cataractes District. As of 2012 the town's population was estimated to be 13,855.

== History ==
The station of Luozi was established in 1885 by the Belgian colonial authorities at the point where the Luozi River flows into the Congo. The first colonial administrator was Albert Van Duerne, who laid out the boundaries of the chiefdoms in the territory and ordered that small villages be consolidated into larger ones. A chapel was built at Luozi by missionaries between 1903 and 1906. The chapel and the administrative buildings were burned down in 1909 in violence that followed an outbreak of smallpox and sleeping sickness, for which the whites were blamed.

A military station was established at Luozi. A trading post was opened in 1927 by the Compagnie Belge du Commerce and an airstrip was built, with the first flight landing in December 1928. In February 1933 Luozi was made capital of the Manianga Territory, and in 1949 capital of Luozi Territory. In 1949 a hospital was opened, with wards for men and women, an operating room, administrative building and staff quarters. The same year, a paved road was opened linking Luozi to Matadi and Boma.

== Today ==
The city of Luozi today has a number of churches, and these sponsor primary, secondary and vocational schools. The city is home to the Free University of Luozi and other higher educational institutions.
