= Lisala Territory =

Lisala
- Territory
- Interactive map of Lisala
- Coordinates: 2°26′0″N 20°58′55″E
- Country: DR Congo
- Province: Mongala
- HQ: Bobala

Area
  - Total: 18,417 km^{2} (7,111 sq mi)

Population (2020)
  - Total: 812,089
  - Density: 44.095/km^{2} (114.20/sq mi)
- Time zone: UTC+1 (West Africa Time)

Lisala is a territory of Mongala province in the Democratic Republic of the Congo. After the town of Lisala became a separately administered city, it was decided to move the territory's administrative center from there to Bobala.

The population is made up of several different ethnic groups, notably Ngombe with minorities of Mongo, Ngandi, Ngwaka and Budja.

The area is crossed by the N6 road, of the Route Nationale and is bordered to the west by the Mongala River and to the south by the Congo River.
