= Dilolo Territory =

Dilolo Wilaya ya Dilolo (Swahili)
- Territory
- Interactive map of Dilolo
- Location within Democratic Republic of the Congo
- Coordinates: 10.6866°S 22.3435°E
- Country: DR Congo
- Province: Lualaba

Area
  - Total: 24,963 km^{2} (9,638 sq mi)

Population (2020)
  - Total: 333,852
  - Density: 13.374/km^{2} (34.638/sq mi)
- Time zone: UTC+2 (CAT)

Dilolo is a territory in the Lualaba Province of the Democratic Republic of the Congo.

Communities: Dilolo
