= Mongala River =

River in Democratic Republic of the Congo

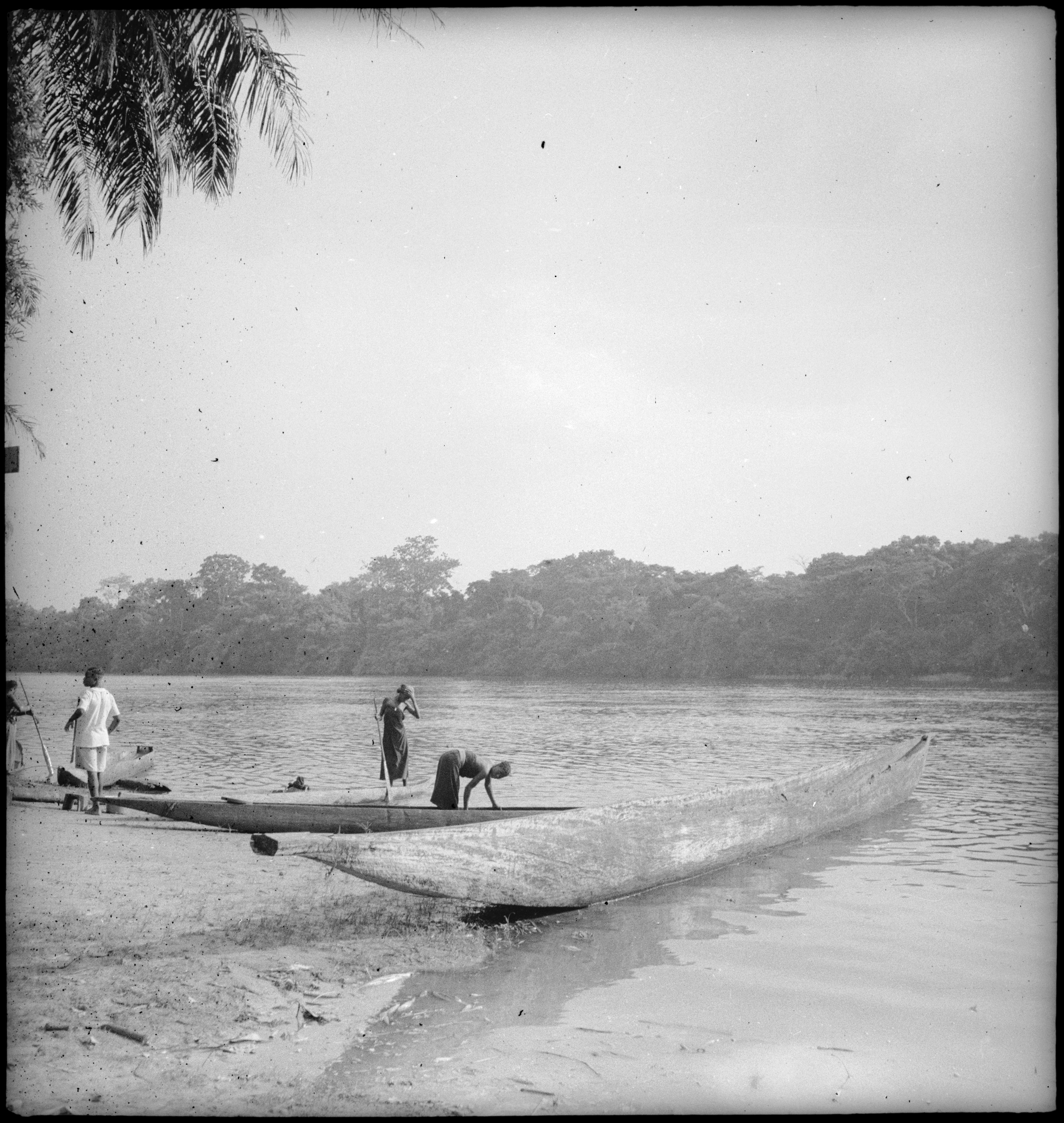
- Dug-outs on the Mongala c. 1941

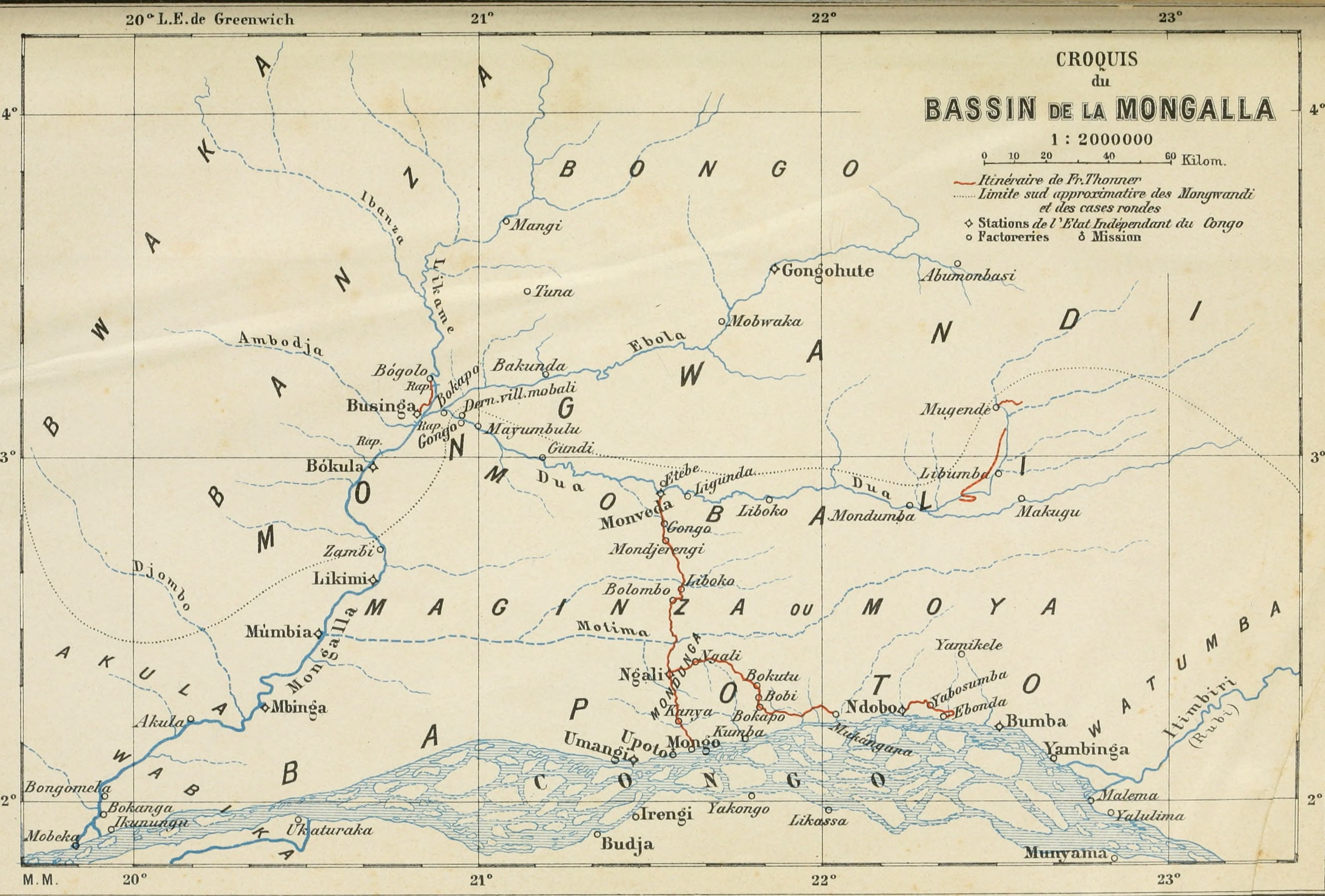
- 1899 map of the Mongala

- Location within Democratic Republic of the Congo

Location
- Country: Democratic Republic of the Congo

Physical characteristics
- Source
  - coordinates: 3°19′24″N 20°57′38″E
- Mouth: Congo River
  - coordinates: 1.890231°N 19.774108°E
- Length: 285 km (177 mi)
- Basin size: 52,200 km^{2} (20,200 mi^{2})

Basin features
- Tributaries
  - left: Dwa River, Motima River
  - right: Ebola River, Likame River, Libala River, Banga-Melo River

The Mongala River (Swahili: Mto Mongala) in the northern Democratic Republic of the Congo is a right tributary of the Congo River.

== Course ==
The Mongala River is 285 kilometres (177 mi) long, or 510 kilometres (320 mi) long if the Ebola tributary is included. It is formed by the confluence of the Dwa River and the Ebola River in Nord-Ubangi province upstream from Businga.

It flows southwest and then south past Likimi on its right bank, then turns to flow west past Binga on its left bank and then southwest to its confluence with the right bank of the Congo River at Mobeka. For most of its course it defines the western boundary between Mongala province and Sud-Ubangi province. Near its mouth the last short section runs between Mongala and Équateur province.

== History ==
The Belgian soldier Ernest Baert undertook two explorations of the Mongala River despite the hostility of the local people, who attempted to capture the steamers.

He left Bangala on 23 November 1886 and ascended the Mongala on the A.I.A. for 66 hours to the furthest point reached by his predecessors George Grenfell and Camille Coquilhat, where he found a large local population that became increasingly hostile as the expedition advanced and attacked several times. He reached Mongandi and the Ebola–Dwa confluence on 1 December 1886, and founded a station at Moboika before returning to Bangalas.

== Sources ==
- Coosemans, M. (1948b), "BAERT (Ernest)", Biographie Coloniale Belge (in French), vol. I, Inst. roy. colon. belge, pp. col. 54–57
- "Relation: Mongala (1212884)", OpenStreetMap
- Van den Bossche, J.-P.; Bernacsek, G.M. (1990), Source Book for the Inland Fishery Resources of Africa, vol. 1, Rome: Food and Agriculture Organization of the United Nations, ISBN 9789251029831
