= Boende Territory =

Coordinates: 0°29′40″S 20°59′57″E

Boende
- Territory
- Interactive map of Boende
- Country: DR Congo
- Province: Tshuapa
- HQ: Wema

Area
  - Total: 19,718 km^{2} (7,613 sq mi)

Population (2019)
  - Total: 357,250
  - Density: 18.118/km^{2} (46.925/sq mi)
- Time zone: UTC+1 (West Africa Time)

Boende is a territory of Tshuapa province in the Democratic Republic of the Congo. After the town of Boende became a separately administered city, it was decided to move the territory's administrative center from there to Wema.
