= Kasongo Lunda =

- Commune
- Location in Democratic Republic of the Congo
- Coordinates: 6.478342°S 16.816592°E
- Country: DR Congo
- Province: Kwango
- Territory: Kasongo Lunda

Population (2012)
  - Total: 23,820

Kasongo Lunda is a town and the seat of Kasongo Lunda Territory, in the Kwango Province of the Democratic Republic of the Congo. The town lies near the border with Angola to the east, here defined by the Kwango River. As of 2012, the town was estimated to have a population of 23,820.
