= Bongandanga =

- Location in the Democratic Republic of the Congo
- Coordinates: 1°30′36″N 21°3′0″E
- Country: Democratic Republic of the Congo
- Province: Mongala

Population (2009)
  - Total: 4,625
- Time zone: UTC+1 (Kinshasa Time)
- National language: Lingala
- Climate: Af

Bongandanga is a small town in Mongala Province in the northwestern part of the Democratic Republic of the Congo. In 2009, it had an estimated population of 4625. It is the administrative center of the Bongandanga Territory.
