= Luebo Territory =

Luebo
- Territory
- Interactive map of Luebo
- Country: DR Congo
- Province: Kasaï

Area
  - Total: 8,450 km^{2} (3,260 sq mi)

Population
  - Total: 938,985
  - Density: 111/km^{2} (288/sq mi)
- Time zone: UTC+2 (CAT)

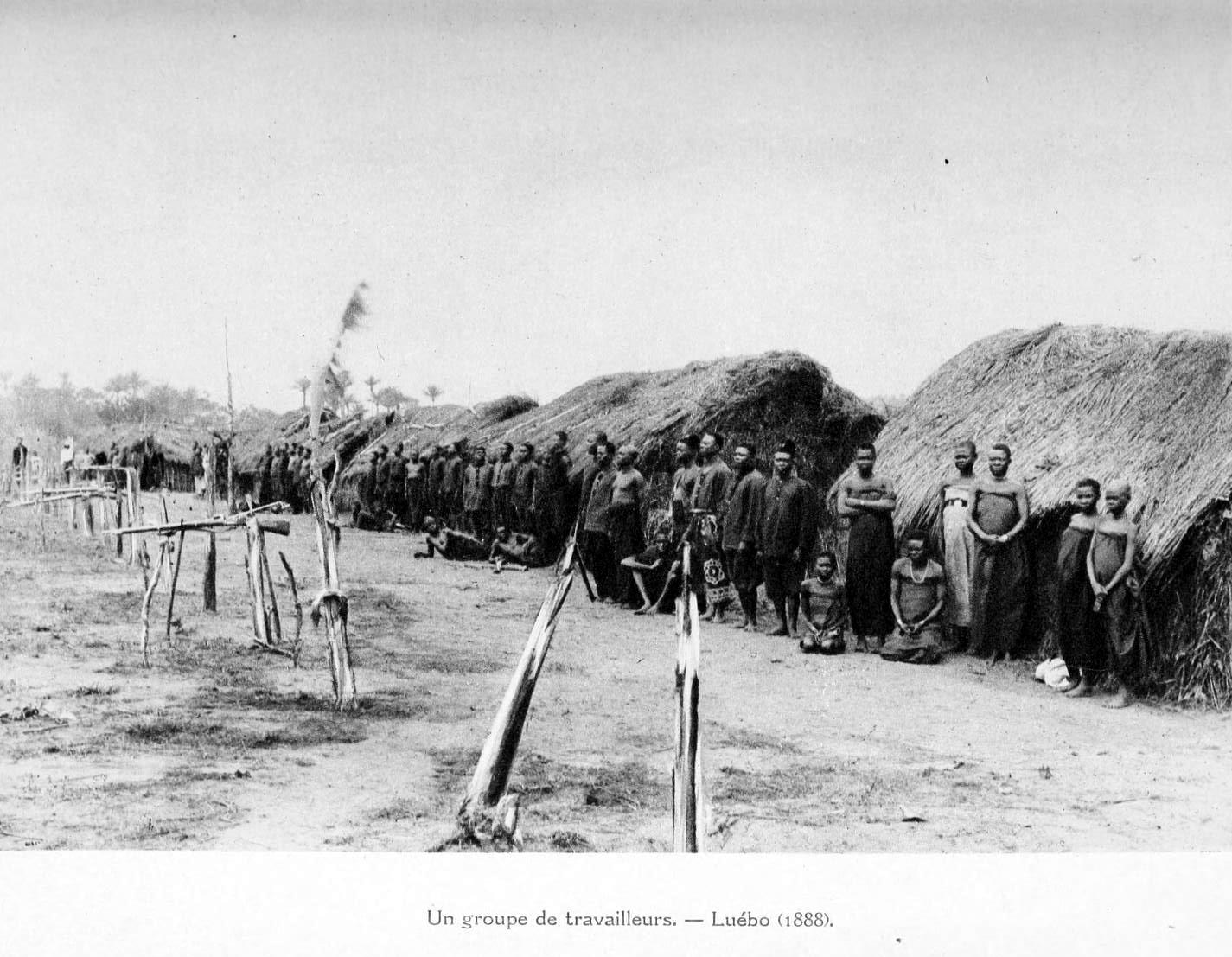
A group of workers, Luébo (1888)

Luebo is a territory of Kasai province of the Democratic Republic of the Congo.
