= Aru Territory =

Aru Wilaya ya Aru (Swahili)
- Territory
- Territoire d‘Aru (French)
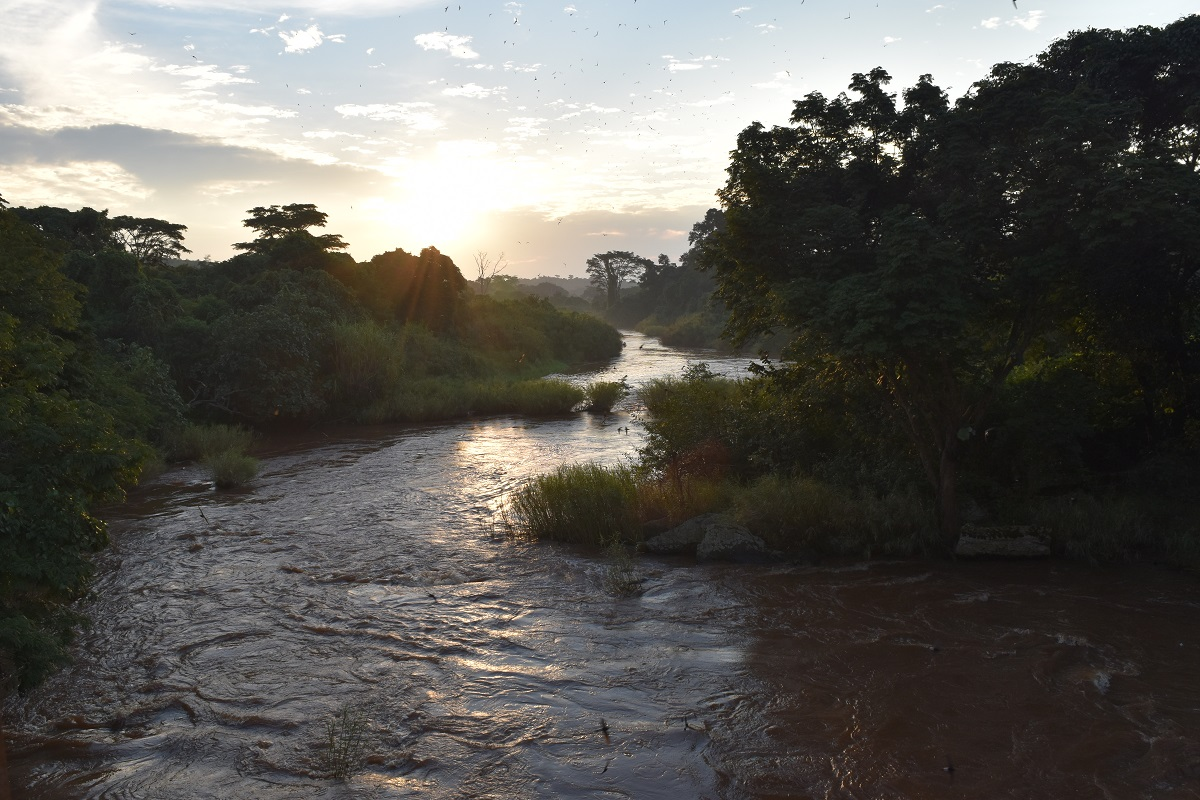
- Aru territory, Province of Ituri, DR Congo: Sunset on the Aru River in Aru territory, Ituri Province
- Interactive map of Aru
- Location in DR Congo
- Coordinates: 2°52′N 30°51′E
- Country: DR Congo
- Province: Ituri
- Seat: Aru

Area
  - Total: 6,749 km^{2} (2,606 sq mi)

Population (2020)
  - Total: 1,633,142
  - Density: 242.0/km^{2} (626.7/sq mi)
- Time zone: UTC+2 (CAT)
- National language: Swahili

Aru is a territory of Ituri province, Democratic Republic of the Congo, and the name of the territory's administrative capital, Aru Town. The territory is located at the northern edge of the province, on the border with Uganda to the east and South Sudan to the north.

During the 1998-2006 war in the Congo, Aru was the base of the Ugandan-backed Armed Forces of the Congolese People (FAPC) group, headed by Jérôme Kakwavu. While the war had a severe impact on the region, Aru was spared the atrocities that ravaged the rest of Ituri district. This was, in part, due to the territory's diversity of tribes who had been accustomed to living peacefully together.

While Aru Town is the administrative capital of the territory, Ariwara, which is close to Arua, Uganda, is its economic hub where businesspeople from DRC, Southern Sudan and Uganda meet to trade cows, manufactured goods and other products. Smuggling of ivory and other contraband also occurs.

Aru has a small airport but no public electricity grid, although UNHCR was up until recently supplying electricity to Aru Town using electric generators. The United Nations peacekeeping force in the Congo, MONUC, maintained a base of operations in Aru in the later stages of the war to assist with the conduct of elections in the area. The operation was successful with over 85% of voters registering and voting; no serious incidents were registered in the territory.
