= Masi-Manimba Territory =

Masi-Manimba
- Territory
- Interactive map of Masi-Manimba
- Coordinates: 4.778995°S 17.907715°E
- Country: DR Congo
- Province: Kwilu
- Seat: Masi-Manimba

Area
  - Total: 14,327 km^{2} (5,532 sq mi)
- Elevation: 595 m (1,952 ft)

Population (2016)
  - Total: 1,571,503
  - Density: 109.69/km^{2} (284.09/sq mi)
- Time zone: UTC+1 (WAT)
- National language: Kikongo

Masi-Manimba Territory is an administrative area of Kwilu province, Democratic Republic of the Congo. Its headquarters are in the town of Masi-Manimba, on the Lukula River, a tributary of the Kwilu River. The Luie and Kafi rivers also run from south to north through the territory, tributaries of the Lukula. The territory is divided into ten sectors: Bindungi, Kibolo, Kinzenga, Kinzenzengo, Kitoy, Masi-Manimba, Mokamo, Mosango, Pay-Kongila and Sungu.
