= Bukama Territory =

Bukama Wilaya ya Bukama (Swahili)
- Territory
- Interactive map of Bukama
- Location within Democratic Republic of the Congo
- Coordinates: 8.89°S 26.11°E
- Country: DR Congo
- Province: Haut-Lomami
- Time zone: UTC+2 (CAT)

Bukama is a territory in the Haut-Lomami province of the Democratic Republic of the Congo. The territory contains town of Bukama, as well as the eastern half of Upemba National Park.

== History ==
In January 2024, a group of 40 Mai Mai Kata Katanga fighters stormed the police station in Bukama Territory's Luena village, raising the separatist Katangese flag and demanding the release of a militia member arrested at the location. However, the local policemen were able to easily repel the raid with some reinforcements. From 7 to 8 December 2024, 80 Mai Mai Kata Katanga militants raided the village of Kapando, Bukama Territory, where they killed two civilians and stole 500,000 Congolese francs. Many civilians fled the area in response.

== Politics ==
Bukama Territory is represented in the National Assembly by five deputies:

- Prosper Kabila (GSCO)
- Edmond Kabongo (UDCO)
- Ida Kitwe (FSIR)
- Émile Christophe Mota (UNAFEC)
- Paul Mutonkole (ECT)
