= Ubundu =

- Commune
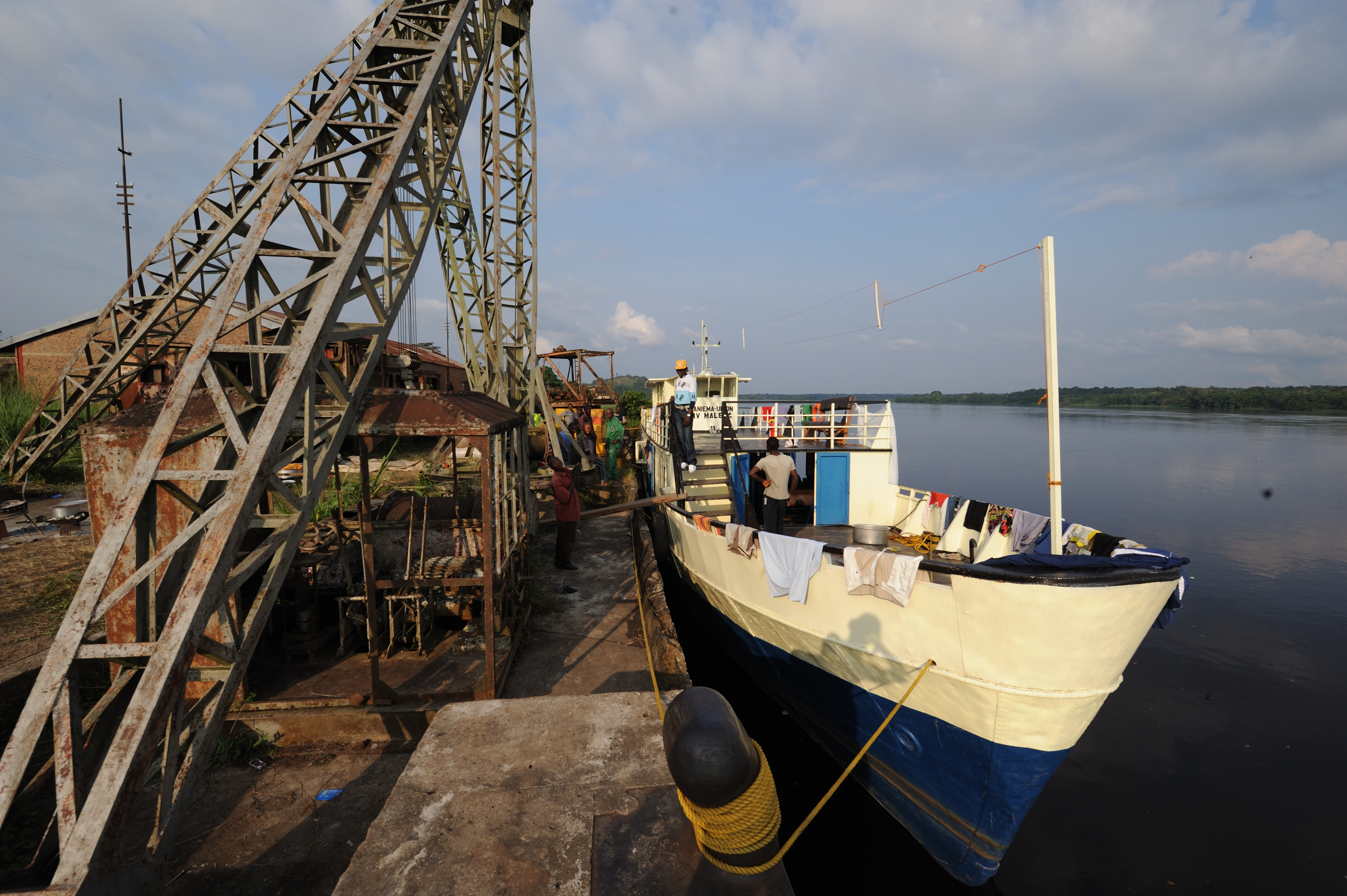
- Ubundu is a port on the Congo River, about a 100 km up a muddy road from Kisangani.

- Location within Democratic Republic of the Congo
- Coordinates: 0.358813°S 25.433221°E
- Country: DR Congo
- Province: Tshopo
- Territory: Ubundu
- Time zone: UTC+2 (CAT)
- Climate: Tropical raninforest (Af)
- National language: Swahili

Ubundu, formerly known as Ponthierville or Ponthierstad, is a town located in the Tshopo Province of the Democratic Republic of the Congo and is the administrative center of the territory of the same name. It is on the Lualaba River, or Upper Congo, just above the Boyoma Falls.

== Transport links ==
Upstream from Ubundu the river is navigable as far as Kasongo. Downstream, the river from Ubundu to Kisangani is not navigable because of a series of rapids. During the colonial era a portage railway was built to link the settlement to Kisangani. It was built and operated by the Compagnie du chemin de fer du Congo supérieur aux Grands Lacs africains of CFL (1902-1960) whose rail and river steamer service connected Kisangani with Katanga. By 2000 the rail track had fallen into disuse and become completely overgrown and unusable. The road to Kisangani was a dirt track, only passable by motorbike.

In July of 2025, the DRC signed a $257 million concession contract to revamp the 115 kilometre long Kisangani–Ubundu railway segment, expected for completion in 2028.

== History ==
In 1951, Katharine Hepburn, Humphrey Bogart and the crew of the film The African Queen arrived in Ubundu by train for filming in the jungle. In those days, the town was described as a "pretty colonial outpost".

The area saw some of the worst fighting during the Second Congo War and in early 1997 many Hutu refugees fleeing from the Battle of Kisangani were massacred between Kisangani and Ubundu.

By around 2003, the town was described as a "very dangerous" place with no electricity and very few facilities.

== See also ==
- Transport in DRC
