= Kahemba Territory =

Kahemba
- Interactive map of Kahemba
- Coordinates: 7°18′20″S 18°57′55″E
- Country: Democratic Republic of the Congo
- Province: Kwango

Population
  - Total: 18,061
- Time zone: UTC+1 (WAT)

Kahemba is a territory of the Democratic Republic of the Congo. It is located in Kwango Province. Divisions are:

- Kulindji Sector
- Bindu Sector
- Bangu Sector
- Muloshi Chiefdom
- Mwa-Mushiko Chiefdom
- Mwendjila Chiefdom
