= Luozi Territory =

Luozi
- Territory
- Interactive map of Luozi
- Location within Democratic Republic of the Congo
- Coordinates: 4.916902°S 14.154897°E
- Country: DR Congo
- Province: Kongo Central

Area
  - Total: 7,772 km^{2} (3,001 sq mi)

Population
  - Total: 214,397
  - Density: 27.59/km^{2} (71.45/sq mi)
- Time zone: UTC+1 (WAT)

Luozi Territory is an administrative area in Kongo Central province of the Democratic Republic of the Congo. The headquarters are in the city of Luozi. The Luozi territory is also known as the Manianga.

== Overview ==
The territory is divided into sectors: Kinkenge, Mbanza-Mwembe, Mbanza Mona, Mbanza Ngoyo, Mongo Luala, Kimumba, Kenge, Kimbanza, Kivunda and Balari. It extends north from the Congo River, and is bordered by the Republic of the Congo to the north. The town of Luozi lies on the north bank of Congo River.

The territory has an area of 7,502 square kilometres (2,897 sq mi). Plateaus in the east and west of the territory rise to 800 metres (2,600 ft), divided by the Luala valley in the center at 235 metres (771 ft) which extends from the town of Luozi to Nkunda. The climate is tropical, with temperatures between 16 °C (61 °F) and 35 °C (95 °F). Annual rainfall is between 500 millimetres (20 in) and 1,000 millimetres (39 in), falling during the 8-month wet season. As of 2002 the territory had a population of 192,004.

The economy is mainly agricultural, with women working the fields and men engaged in hunting, fishing, forestry, construction and furniture-making. Products include cassava, peanuts and corn, fruits such as avocado, pineapple, guava, sugar cane, mango, lemon and mandarin orange, coffee, pumpkins, oil palm and a wide variety of vegetables. There are some minerals including gold, diamonds, copper and iron but these have not been exploited.
