= Banalia Territory =

Banalia Wilaya ya Banalia (Swahili)
- Territory
- Interactive map of Banalia
- Coordinates: 1.533333°N 25.333333°E
- Country: Democratic Republic of the Congo
- Province: Tshopo
- Seat: Banalia

Area
  - Total: 24,430 km^{2} (9,430 sq mi)

Population
  - Total: 493,697
  - Density: 20.21/km^{2} (52.34/sq mi)
- Time zone: UTC+2 (Central Africa Time)
- National language: Lingala

Banalia is a territory and a locality of Tshopo province in the Democratic Republic of the Congo. It is located in the north-central part of the country, 1,300 km northeast of the capital Kinshasa.

The locality was one of the milestones during the Emin Pasha relief expedition.

The region is also rich in iron ore, which was to feed the Maluku steel plant.

In the surroundings around Banalia grows mainly clean green deciduous forest. Around Banalia, it is very sparsely populated, with 6 inhabitants per square kilometer. Tropical monsoon climate prevails in the area. Annual average temperature in the funnel is 21 °C. The warmest month is May, when the average temperature is 22 °C, and the coldest is March, at 20 °C. Average annual rainfall is 1,540 millimeters. The rainy month is October, with an average of 236 mm rainfall, and the driest is January, with 28 mm rainfall.
