= Malemba-Nkulu Territory =

Malemba-Nkulu Wilaya ya Malemba-Nkulu (Swahili)
- Territory
- Interactive map of Malemba-Nkulu
- Country: DR Congo
- Province: Haut-Lomami
- Time zone: UTC+2 (CAT)

Malemba-Nkulu is a territory in the Haut-Lomami province of the Democratic Republic of the Congo.

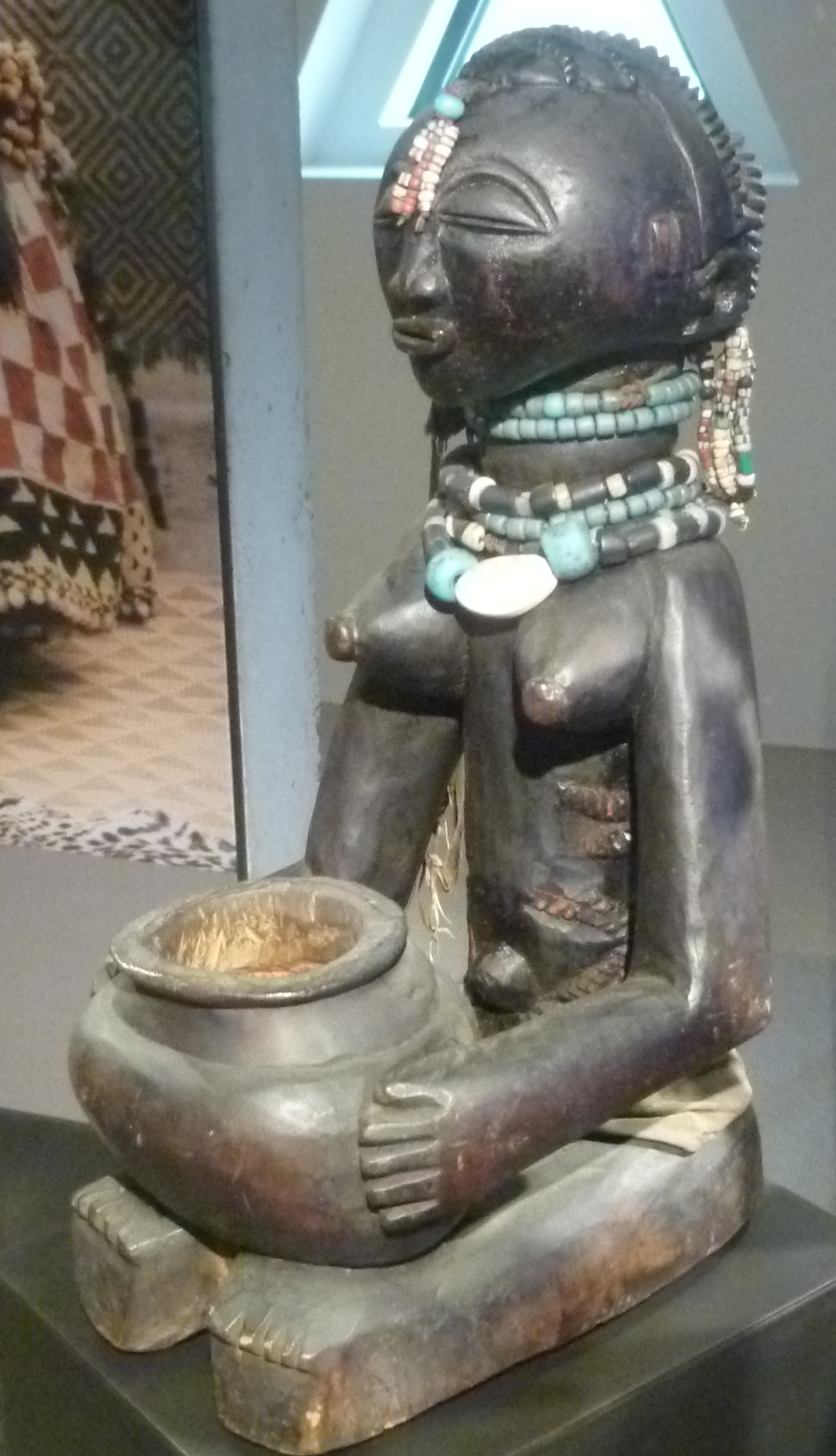
"Woman with a bowl", art of the Malemba Nkulu
