= Bulungu, Kwilu =

Bulungu
- Commune
- Location in the Democratic Republic of the Congo
- Coordinates: 4.55°S 18.6°E
- Country: DR Congo
- Province: Kwilu
- Territory: Bulungu
- Elevation: 1,276 ft (389 m)

Population (2012)
  - Total: 57,168
- Time zone: UTC+1 (WAT)
- Climate: Aw
- National language: Kikongo

Bulungu is a community in the Kwilu Province of the Democratic Republic of the Congo. The town lies on the southwestern bank of the Kwilu River, downstream from Kikwit. Bulungu is the headquarters of the Bulungu Territory. As of 2012 the population was estimated to be 57,168.

== Climate ==
Köppen-Geiger climate classification system classifies its climate as tropical wet and dry (Aw).

Climate data for Bulungu
Month	Jan	Feb	Mar	Apr	May	Jun	Jul	Aug	Sep	Oct	Nov	Dec	Year
Mean daily maximum °C (°F)	29.7 (85.5)	30.4 (86.7)	30.5 (86.9)	30.7 (87.3)	30.6 (87.1)	30.5 (86.9)	30.1 (86.2)	30.7 (87.3)	30.4 (86.7)	30 (86)	29.7 (85.5)	29.6 (85.3)	30.2 (86.5)
Daily mean °C (°F)	25.1 (77.2)	25.5 (77.9)	25.6 (78.1)	25.8 (78.4)	25.4 (77.7)	24.4 (75.9)	24.1 (75.4)	24.9 (76.8)	25.1 (77.2)	25.1 (77.2)	25 (77)	25.1 (77.2)	25.1 (77.2)
Mean daily minimum °C (°F)	20.6 (69.1)	20.7 (69.3)	20.7 (69.3)	20.9 (69.6)	20.2 (68.4)	18.3 (64.9)	18.1 (64.6)	19.1 (66.4)	19.9 (67.8)	20.3 (68.5)	20.3 (68.5)	20.6 (69.1)	20.0 (68.0)
Source: Climate-data.org
