= Kasongo Lunda Territory =

Kasongo Lunda
- Territory
- Interactive map of Kasongo Lunda
- Coordinates: 6°28′S 16°49′E
- Country: Democratic Republic of the Congo
- Province: Kwango

Area
  - Total: 26,648 km^{2} (10,289 sq mi)

Population
  - Total: 1,705,168
  - Density: 63.989/km^{2} (165.73/sq mi)
- Time zone: UTC+1 (WAT)

Kasongo Lunda is a territory in the Democratic Republic of Congo, located in Kwango Province. The capital lies at Kasongo Lunda. It is the second biggest territory in Congo, located near to the border with Angola.

== Politics ==
The traditional title for a local ruler was kiamfu or kyambvu. During the colonization of Congo in the 1940s, the Kiamfu's represented the political opposition and resistance against Europeans. The heads of the political hierarchy and apparatus of the Kasongo-Lunda have been often forced to flee the area, mainly to the territories of today's Angola.

The territory is divided into Chiefdoms and Sectors:

- Kasa Chiefdom
- Kasongo-Lunda Chiefdom
- Kibunda Sector
- Kingulu Sector
- Kizamba Sector
- Mawanga Sector
- Panzi Sector
- Swa Tenda Sector

== Economy ==
Kasongo Lunda has a number of development problems: the road infrastructure is in a bad condition, because of permanent erosion, the lack of money and political will to change the situation. Another major problem is the shortage of drinking water, and electricity. As for education, Kasongo Lunda has a good reputation with the famous jesuit N'temo college, which offers secondary education to about 430 students.

== List of rulers of Kasongo-Lunda ==
Term	Incumbent	Notes
c.1700	Foundation of Kasongo Lunda	
???? to 1859	Muteeba Kadi; Muteeba Nzuzi; Mbaala	
1859 to 1886	Naweesi	
1886 to 1894	Tsiimba Mukuumbi	
1894 to 1902	Lukookisa	
1902 to 1904	Muloombo	
1904 to 1915	Mwaana Koko; Kodi Pwaanga	1st Term
1915 to 1922	Mulumbi Mbisi	
1922 to 1925	Kabeya	
1925 to 1929	Bivula Bangi	
1929 to 1939	Mwaana Koko; Kodi Pwaanga	2nd Term
1939 to 1941	Kambaamba	
1941 to 1945	Mukulu Désiré	
1945 to 19??	Paandzu Pfumukulu	
