= Dimbelenge Territory =

Dimbelenge
- Territory
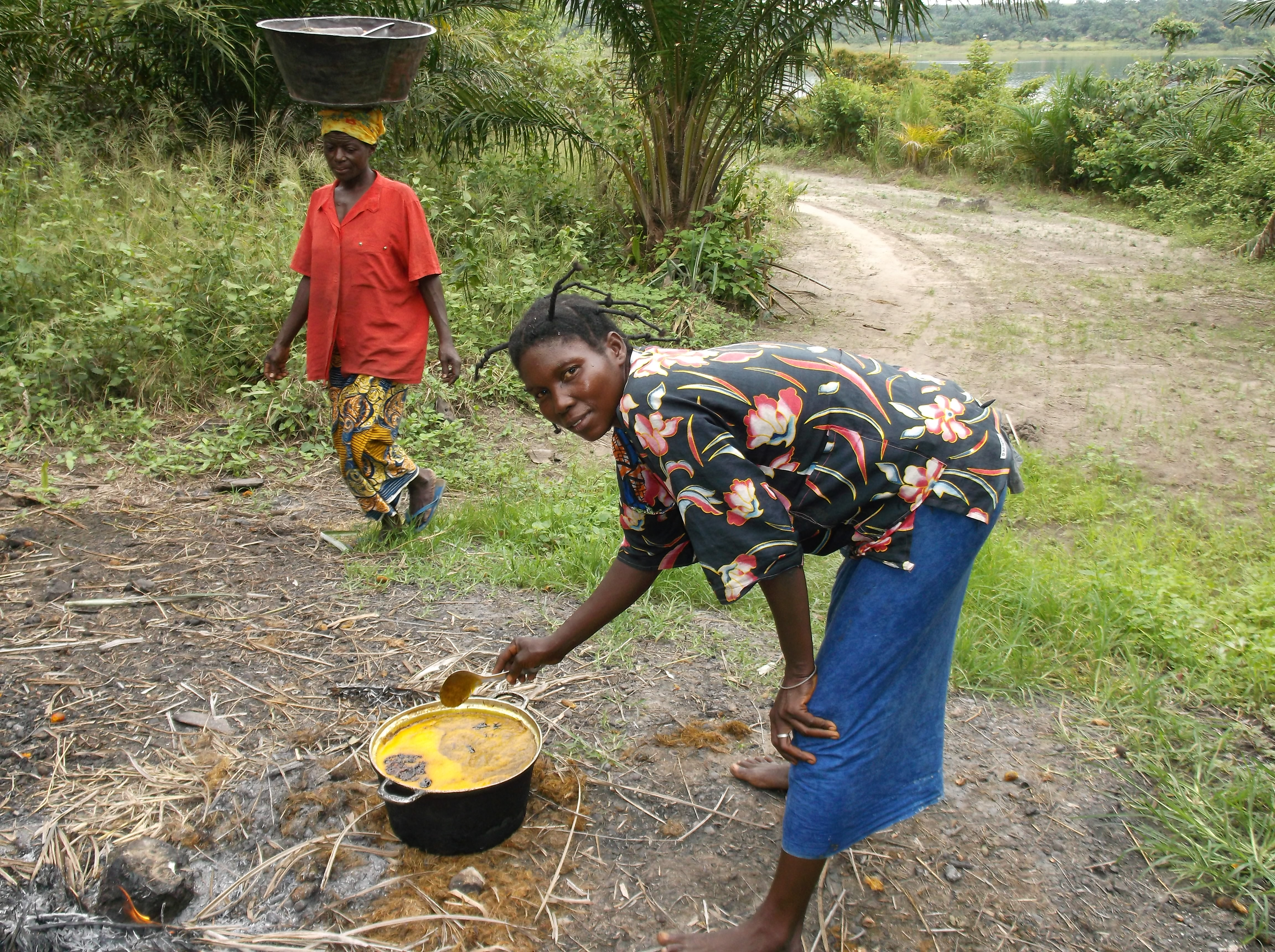
- Interactive map of Dimbelenge
- Country: DR Congo
- Province: Kasaï-Central

Area
  - Total: 22,165 km^{2} (8,558 sq mi)

Population
  - Total: 482,275
  - Density: 21.758/km^{2} (56.354/sq mi)
- Time zone: UTC+2 (CAT)

Dimbelenge is a territory in Kasai-Central province of the Democratic Republic of the Congo.
