= Luiza Territory =

Luiza
- Territory
- Interactive map of Luiza
- Coordinates: 7.2°S 22.41667°E
- Country: DR Congo
- Province: Kasaï-Central

Area
  - Total: 14,702 km^{2} (5,676 sq mi)

Population (2020)
  - Total: 1,515,339
  - Density: 103.07/km^{2} (266.95/sq mi)
- Time zone: UTC+2 (CAT)

Luiza is a territory of Kasai-Central province of the Democratic Republic of the Congo. It covers an area of 14,702 square kilometers. As of March 2021, its inhabitants numbered 1,515,339. It is represented in the National Assembly by four elected deputies.

The climate designation is tropical savannah with dry winters.
