= Demba Territory =

Demba
- Territory
- Interactive map of Demba
- Country: DR Congo
- Province: Kasaï-Central

Area
  - Total: 8,825 km^{2} (3,407 sq mi)

Population
  - Total: 921,497
  - Density: 104.4/km^{2} (270.4/sq mi)
- Time zone: UTC+2 (CAT)

Demba is one of the five territories in Kasai-Central province of the Democratic Republic of the Congo.
