= Yahuma =

Coordinates: 1°08′N 23°07′E

Yahuma is a territory of the Democratic Republic of the Congo. It is located in Tshopo Province.
