= Mahagi (territory) =

Mahagi Territory Wilaya ya Mahagi (Swahili)
- Territory
- Territoire de Mahagi
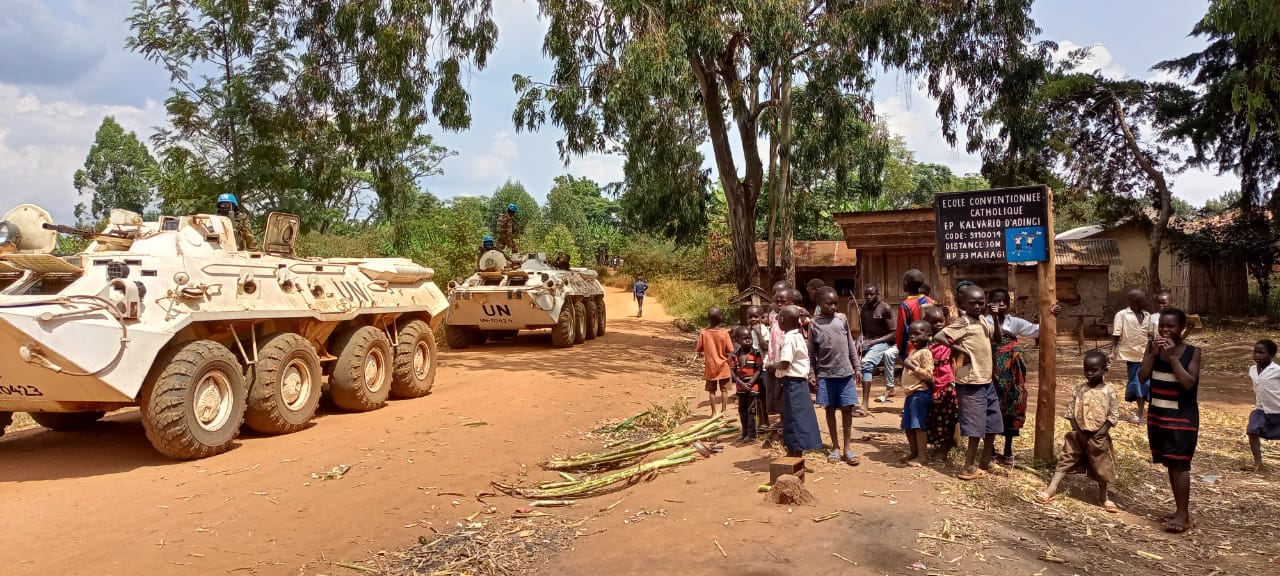
- Amee-based MONUSCO peacekeepers from Bangladesh organized in January 2022 on a long-range patrol towards Aungba.
- Interactive map of Mahagi Territory
- Location in DR Congo
- Coordinates: 2.30033°N 30.99174°E
- Country: DR Congo
- Province: Ituri
- Seat: Mahagi

Area
  - Total: 5,216 km^{2} (2,014 sq mi)

Population (2020)
  - Total: 3,647,508
  - Density: 699.3/km^{2} (1,811/sq mi)
- Time zone: UTC+2 (Central Africa Time)

Mahagi is a territory and a locality of Ituri province in the Democratic Republic of the Congo. It is located in the northeastern part of the country, 1,900 km east of the capital Kinshasa.

The surroundings around Mahagi are a mosaic of farmland and natural vegetation. Around Mahagi, it is quite densely populated, with 172 inhabitants per square kilometer. The region has a savanna climate. Annual average temperature in the funnel is 21 °C. The warmest month is February, when the average temperature is 24 °C, and the coldest is August, with 18 °C. Average annual rainfall is 1,057 millimeters. The rainy month is September, with an average of 182 mm rainfall, and the driest is January, with 8 mm rainfall.
