= Bafwasende =

- Town
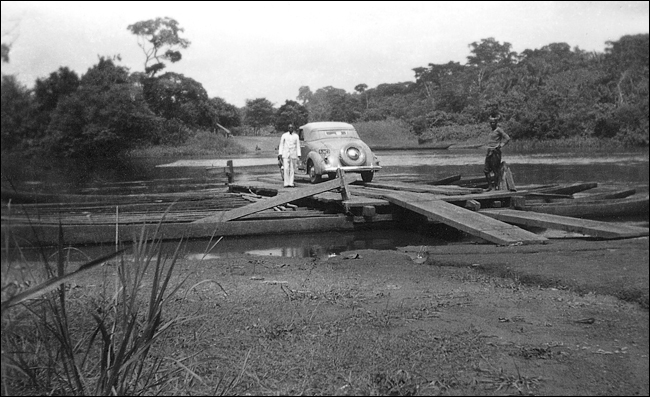
- Crossing the Lindi River at Bafwasende, sometime between 1938 and 1958.

- Location within Democratic Republic of the Congo
- Coordinates: 1°0′37″N 27°9′42″E
- Country: Democratic Republic of the Congo
- Province: Tshopo
- Time zone: UTC+2 (CAT)
- Climate: Af
- National language: Swahili

Bafwasende is a town in the Tshopo Province of the Democratic Republic of the Congo. It lies on the Lindi River.

== Climate ==
Climate data for Bafwasende, elevation 524 m (1,719 ft), (1971–2000)
Month	Jan	Feb	Mar	Apr	May	Jun	Jul	Aug	Sep	Oct	Nov	Dec	Year
Mean daily maximum °C (°F)	30.6 (87.1)	31.3 (88.3)	31.3 (88.3)	30.9 (87.6)	30.4 (86.7)	29.6 (85.3)	27.9 (82.2)	28.3 (82.9)	29.9 (85.8)	30.2 (86.4)	30.6 (87.1)	30.1 (86.2)	30.1 (86.2)
Mean daily minimum °C (°F)	18.8 (65.8)	18.9 (66.0)	19.7 (67.5)	20.2 (68.4)	20.1 (68.2)	19.6 (67.3)	19.2 (66.6)	19.2 (66.6)	19.4 (66.9)	19.6 (67.3)	19.5 (67.1)	19.6 (67.3)	19.5 (67.1)
Average precipitation mm (inches)	68.0 (2.68)	88.0 (3.46)	173.0 (6.81)	176.0 (6.93)	185.0 (7.28)	128.0 (5.04)	148.0 (5.83)	200.0 (7.87)	170.0 (6.69)	198.0 (7.80)	168.0 (6.61)	84.0 (3.31)	1,786 (70.31)
Average relative humidity (%)	86	84	85	86	87	89	92	90	87	86	85	87	87
Source: FAO
