= Kasenga Territory =

Territory in the south-eastern part of the DRC

Kasenga Wilaya ya Kasenga (Swahili)
- Territory
- Interactive map of Kasenga
- Country: DR Congo
- Province: Haut-Katanga Province3
- Time zone: UTC+2 (CAT)

Kasenga is a territory in the Haut-Katanga Province of the Democratic Republic of the Congo. It is located in the southeastern portion of the country, and borders Zambia to the east.

The territory has suffered from significant deforestation as loggers have exploited the forests of Pterocarpus tinctorius for their wood, known as padauk. A significant pressure that has led to increased logging is the difficulty of performing effective or profitable agricultural work in the region. At least one reforestation program is planned for the territory.
