= Businga =

- Commune
- Location in the Democratic Republic of the Congo
- Coordinates: 3°20′23″N 20°52′12″E
- Country: DR Congo
- Province: Nord-Ubangi
- Territory: Businga

Population (2009)
  - Total: 32,584
- Time zone: UTC+1 (West Africa Time)

Businga is a town in Nord-Ubangi Province of north-western Democratic Republic of the Congo. It is the administrative center of the territory of the same name. In 2009 it had an estimated population of 32,584.

== Topography ==
Businga is located on the Mongala River, approximately 120 miles northeast of its confluence with the Congo River. 6 miles further to the east, the Mongala River bifurcates into the Ebola River to the north – the namesake of the deadly Ebola virus.
