= Bosobolo =

- Commune
- Location in the Democratic Republic of the Congo
- Coordinates: 4°11′N 19°54′E
- Country: DR Congo
- Province: Nord-Ubangi
- Territory: Bosobolo

Population (2009)
  - Total: 16,397
- Time zone: UTC+1 (West Africa Time)

Bosobolo is a small town in Nord-Ubangi Province of northern Democratic Republic of the Congo. As of 2009 it had an estimated population of 16,397. It is the administrative center of Bosobolo territory.
