= Sandoa Territory =

Sandoa Wilaya ya Sandoa (Swahili)
- Territory
- Interactive map of Sandoa
- Location within Democratic Republic of the Congo
- Coordinates: 9.7°S 22.867°E
- Country: DR Congo
- Province: Lualaba
- Time zone: UTC+2 (CAT)

Sandoa is a territory in the Lualaba Province of the Democratic Republic of the Congo.
