= Miabi Territory =

Territory in the Democratic Republic of the Congo

Miabi
- Territory
- Interactive map of Miabi
- Coordinates: 6.2000°S 23.3830°E
- Country: DR Congo
- Province: Kasaï-Oriental

Area
  - Total: 1,747 km^{2} (675 sq mi)

Population (2020)
  - Total: 984,703
  - Density: 563.7/km^{2} (1,460/sq mi)
- Time zone: UTC+2 (CAT)

Miabi is a territory in Kasai-Oriental province of the Democratic Republic of the Congo.
