= Lupatapata Territory =

Lupatapata
- Territory
- Interactive map of Lupatapata
- Coordinates: 5°59′S 23°33′E
- Country: DR Congo
- Province: Kasaï-Oriental
- Time zone: UTC+2 (CAT)

Lupatapata or Luhatahata is a territory in Kasai-Oriental province of the Democratic Republic of the Congo.
