= Niangara =

- Location within Democratic Republic of the Congo
- Coordinates: 3.691°N 27.896°E
- Country: Democratic Republic of the Congo
- Province: Haut-Uele
- Territory: Niangara Territory
- Climate: Aw
- National language: Lingala

Niangara is a town in the Haut-Uele Province of the Democratic Republic of the Congo, lying on both sides of the Uele River. It is the headquarters of the Niangara Territory.

The town has a hospital operated by Médecins Sans Frontières. As of April 2010 the United Nations peacekeeping mission in Congo had a base in Niangara town. However, the peacekeepers had few troops and the roads in the area are poor, so they rarely leave the town. They have neither prevented nor responded to a series of attacks in the territory by the Lord's Resistance Army.

In December 2010 a group of 600 women, children and elderly of the Mbororo people set up camp on the edge of town. They had been driven out of a nearby district by the army, and had come to the town to avoid being raped or killed in the bush. The Médecins sans Frontières doctors provided emergency care. In January 2011, the Mbororo disappeared from their camp, driven out by the army.

== See also ==
- Roman Catholic Diocese of Isiro-Niangara
