= Kabambare Territory =

Territory in Maniema province, Democratic Republic of the Congo

Kabambare Wilaya ya Kabambare (Swahili)
- Territory
- Territoire de Kabambare
- Interactive map of Kabambare
- Coordinates: 4°30′S 27°45′E
- Country: DR Congo
- Province: Maniema
- Time zone: UTC+2 (CAT)

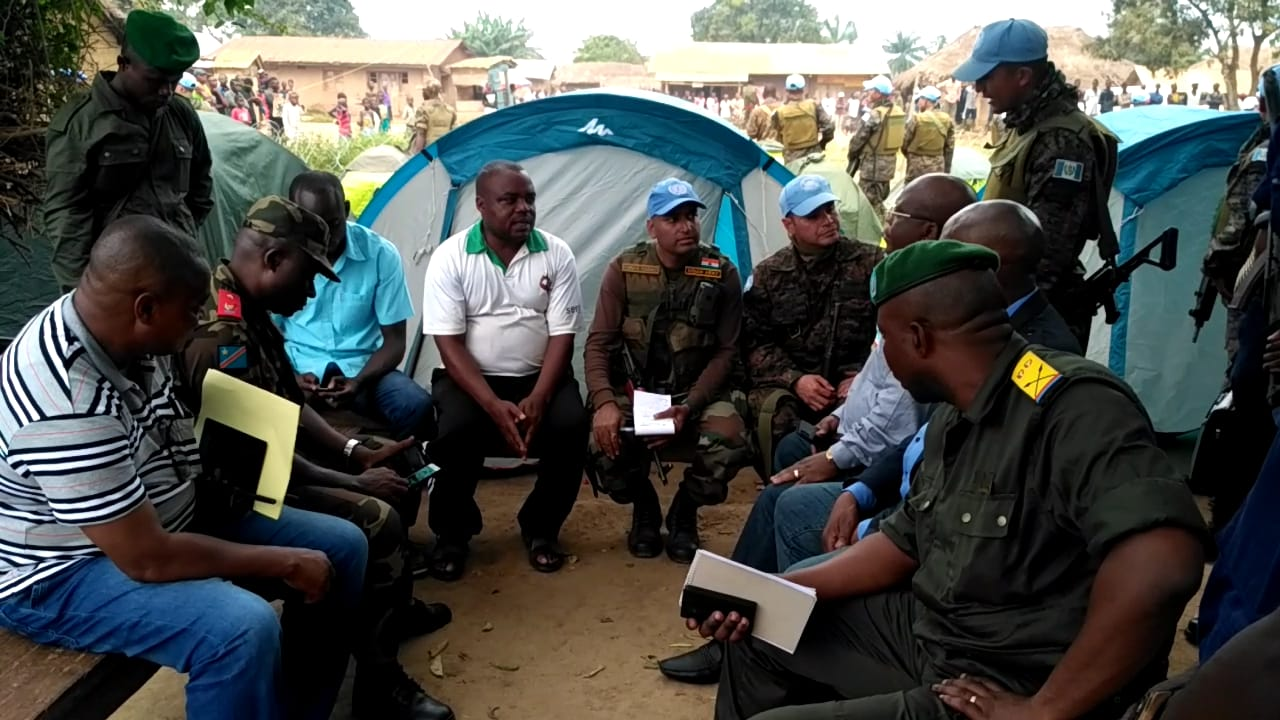
Kabambare territory, Maniema Province, DRC: A debrief in response to an attack on FARDC by approximately 200 MM Malaika and Yakutumba armed cadres on 24 May 2018.

Kabambare is a territory in Maniema province of the Democratic Republic of the Congo. It comprises six collectivities: Babuyu, Bahemba (Kibangula), Bahombo (Kabambare), Lulindi, Saramabila, and Wamaza. The majority of the residents are speakers of Bangubangu. Buyu, and Hemba.
