= Poko (territory) =

- Territory
- Interactive map of Poko
- Coordinates: 3.1°N 26.9°E
- Country: DR Congo
- Province: Bas-Uele
- Seat: Poko

Area
  - Total: 22,909 km^{2} (8,845 sq mi)

Population (2016)
  - Total: 436,293
  - Density: 19.045/km^{2} (49.325/sq mi)
- Time zone: UTC+2 (Central Africa Time)

Poko is a territory and a locality of Bas-Uele province in the Democratic Republic of the Congo.

== Composition ==
It is composed of 13 collectivities (Chiefdoms and sectors):

Sector or Chiefdom	Type
Abarambo	Sector
Babena	Chiefdom
Bakengaie	Chiefdom
Gamu	Chiefdom
Kembisa	Sector
Kipate	Chiefdom
Kumendeni	Chiefdom
Mabanga	Chiefdom
Madi	Chiefdom
Malele	Chiefdom
Ngbaradi	Chiefdom
Soronga	Chiefdom
Zune	Chiefdom
