= Gungu =

- Town
- Location in the Democratic Republic of the Congo
- Coordinates: 5.73333°S 19.31667°E
- Country: DR Congo
- Province: Kwilu
- Territory: Gungu

Government
  - Mayor: Cristóbal Nguie

Population (2012)
  - Total: 23,893
- Time zone: UTC+1 (WAT)
- National language: Kikongo

Gungu is a town in Kwilu Province, Democratic Republic of the Congo (DRC). It is the capital of Gungu Territory as well as Gungu Sector. The town lies west of the Kwilu River and is situated between the streams Lukunia in the south-east and Kitembo in the north-west. The estimated population as of 2012 was 23,893. Gungu is connected to the Congolese Road Network via the RP230 and RP231. Both roads are in a bad condition and the town is only reachable by 4x4 vehicles. As of July 2018, none of the roads in Gungu are paved and the large alleys are overgrown with grass. Only small paths remain that are regularly used by motorcycles. Water supply is provided by pumping water into the town from a nearby stream. There is an electricity network, but as of July 2018, it is not in operation, leaving the town with nearly no power.

Gungu is served by a small airfield, Gungu Airport. It is not continuously maintained but can easily be put into operation when arrivals are announced.

Adolphe Muzito, appointed Prime Minister of the DRC in October 2008, was born in Gungu.

Gungu is well known for the annual national festival of Gungu.
