= Kazumba Territory =

Kazumba
- Territory
- Interactive map of Kazumba
- Country: DR Congo
- Province: Kasaï-Central

Area
  - Total: 12,881 km^{2} (4,973 sq mi)

Population
  - Total: 2,252,285
  - Density: 174.85/km^{2} (452.87/sq mi)
- Time zone: UTC+2 (CAT)

Kazumba is a territory in Kasai-Central province of the Democratic Republic of the Congo.

This Territory has the following Catholic Church Missions such as Mikalayi with a big High School that trained many teachers of primary school; -Mission of Kabwe with High School for the training of priests that trained many Congolese boys among them the first President of the Democratic Republic of Congo, His Excellency Joseph Kasa-vubu;-Mission of Ndekesha located at 10 kilometers from the territorial office of the Territory Administrator; -Mission Tshibala Saint Mary and the Mission of Bilomba etc.
