= Watsa Territory =

Watsa
- Territory
- Interactive map of Watsa
- Coordinates: 3.03716°N 29.53551°E
- Country: DR Congo
- Province: Haut-Uélé
- Seat: Watsa
- Time zone: UTC+2 (Central Africa Time)

Watsa Territory is an administrative area in the Haut-Uélé province of the Democratic Republic of the Congo. The administrative center is the town of Watsa.

== Security issues ==
During the Second Congo War (1998-2003), in August 1998, Ugandan troops occupied areas of Haut-Uélé including the town of Durba, the site of the Gorumbwa, Durba and Agbarabo gold mines. Almost one ton of gold was extracted during the four-year period of occupation, worth about $9 million at the time.

At the end of September 2009, fighters from the Lord's Resistance Army LRA combatants were said to have attacked a number of villages in the Durba/Watsa mining area. As of April 2010 Watsa Territory was thought to have about 13,960 Internally Displaced People.

== Divisions ==
The territory is divided into sectors and chiefdoms:

- Andobi Chiefdom
- Kebo Chiefdom
- Ateru Chiefdom
- Andikofa Chiefdom
- Gombari Sector
- Mari-Minza Chiefdom
- Walese Chiefdom
- Mangbutu Sector
- Kibali Sector
