= Kibombo Territory =

Territory in the Democratic People's Republic of the Congo

Kibombo Wilaya ya Kibombo (Swahili)
- Territory
- Interactive map of Kibombo
- Country: DR Congo
- Province: Maniema

Area
  - Total: 24,953 km^{2} (9,634 sq mi)

Population (2020)
  - Total: 221,247
  - Density: 8.8665/km^{2} (22.964/sq mi)
- Time zone: UTC+2 (CAT)

Kibombo is a territory in Maniema province of the Democratic Republic of the Congo.
