= Rungu (territory) =

- Territory
- Interactive map of Rungu
- Coordinates: 3°11′0″N 27°52′0″E
- Country: DR Congo
- Province: Haut-Uele
- Seat: Rungu
- Time zone: UTC+2 (Central Africa Time)

Rungu is a territory and a locality of Haut-Uele province in the Democratic Republic of the Congo.

Settlements include Rungu and Nangazizi.

== Notable people ==
Micheline Ombae who became the Minister for Gender in 2025 comes from Rungu.
