= Kamonia Territory =

Kamonia
- Territory
- Interactive map of Kamonia
- Coordinates: 6°25′S 20°48′E
- Country: DR Congo
- Province: Kasaï
- Time zone: UTC+2 (CAT)

Kamonia is a territory in Kasaï province of the Democratic Republic of the Congo. Formerly it was named Tshikapa territory.
