= Kabeya-Kamwanga Territory =

Kabeya-Kamwanga
- Territory
- Interactive map of Kabeya-Kamwanga
- Coordinates: 5.96558°S 23.17809°E
- Country: DR Congo
- Province: Kasaï-Oriental

Area
  - Total: 4,500 km^{2} (1,700 sq mi)

Population (2020)
  - Total: 708,679
  - Density: 160/km^{2} (410/sq mi)
- Time zone: UTC+2 (CAT)

Kabeya-Kamwanga is a territory in Kasai-Oriental province of the Democratic Republic of the Congo.
