= Ilebo Territory =

Ilebo
- Territory
- Interactive map of Ilebo
- Country: DR Congo
- Province: Kasaï
- Time zone: UTC+2 (CAT)

Ilebo is a territory in Kasai province of the Democratic Republic of the Congo.
