= Kalemie Territory =

Kalemie Wilaya ya Kalemie (Swahili)
- Territory
- Interactive map of Kalemie
- Coordinates: 5°56′0″S 29°12′0″E
- Country: DR Congo
- Province: Tanganyika
- HQ: Kabimba

Area
  - Total: 30,512 km^{2} (11,781 sq mi)

Population
  - Total: 763,373
  - Density: 25.019/km^{2} (64.798/sq mi)
- Time zone: UTC+2 (Central Africa Time)

Kalemie is a territory of Tanganyika province in the Democratic Republic of the Congo. After the town of Kalemie became a separately administered city, it was decided to move the territory's administrative center from there to Kabimba.
