= Niangara Territory =

Niangara
- Territory
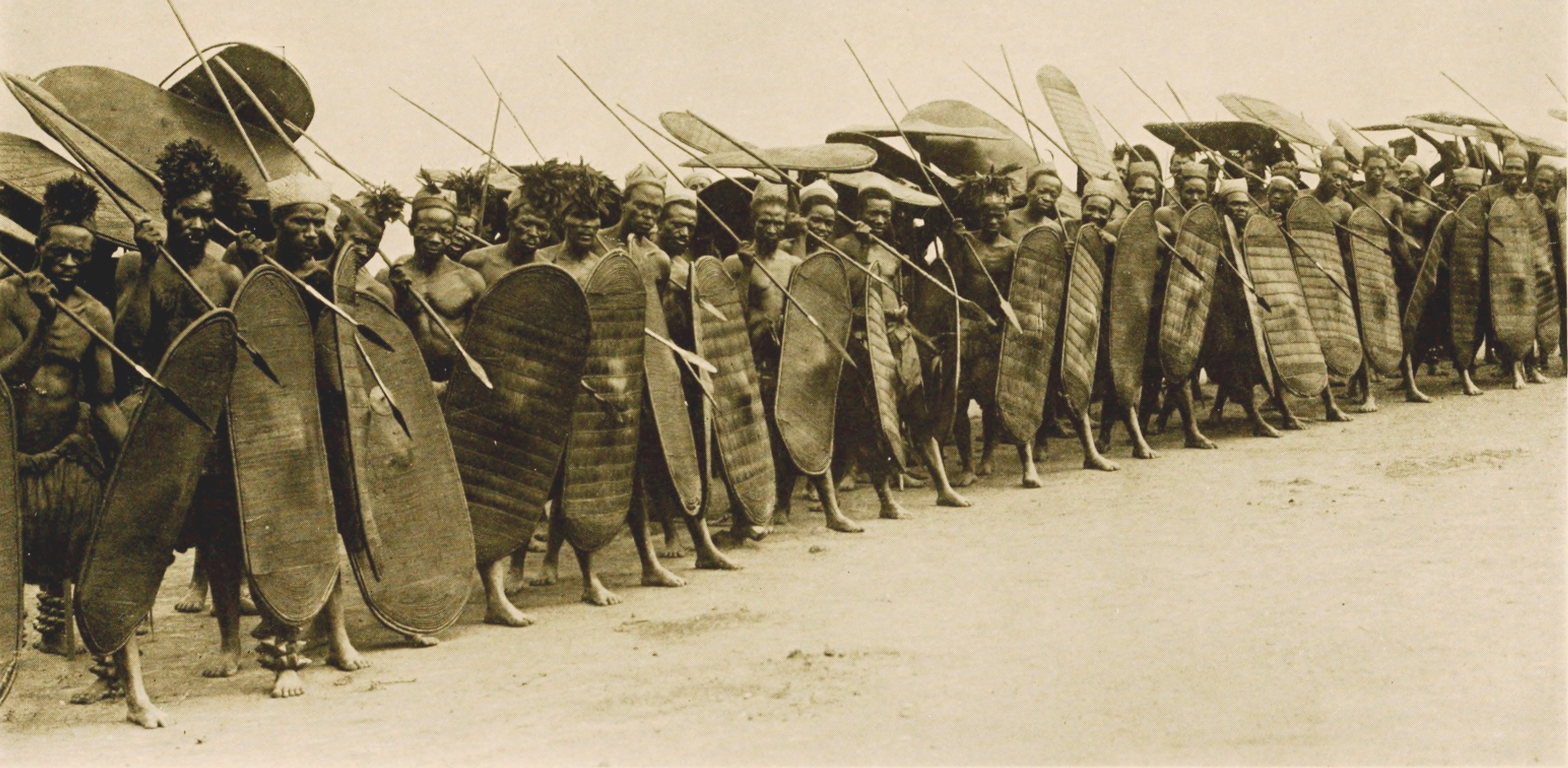
- Azande, warriors of the Bomokandi region, showing off in Manziga's village, near Niangara, c.1900-1918
- Interactive map of Niangara
- Coordinates: 3.692196°N 27.89506°E
- Country: DR Congo
- Province: Haut-Uele
- Seat: Niangara
- Time zone: UTC+2 (Central Africa Time)

Niangara Territory is an administrative region in the Haut-Uele province of the Democratic Republic of the Congo. Its headquarters is the town of Niangara, lying on both sides of the Uele River.

== Economy ==
At least 33,000 people in the territory have no local access to clean water.

== Security problems ==
In January 2010, attacks by the Lord's Resistance Army (LRA) in Niangara Territory displaced about 45,000 people to Rungu Territory in the Haut-Uélé District. It was reported that the Internally Displaced People were living in schools and other public buildings. In May 2010 a group calling itself "The human rights defenders of Niangara" published an appeal to U.S. President Barack Obama to take more effective action against the LRA. There are many other stories of brutality by the LRA, which holds the territory in a reign of fear. As of April 2010 the United Nations peacekeeping mission in Congo had a base in Niangara town. However, the peacekeepers had few troops and the roads in the area are poor, so they rarely leave the town. They have neither prevented nor responded to the attacks by the LRA.

In October 2010 it was reported that several villages in the territory had been invaded by "Mbororo" nomadic pastoralists. These people originally came from the Central African Republic, settling in the DRC during the civil war. They are armed, and drove away the villagers whose land they occupied.

== Divisions ==
The territory is divided into chiefdoms:

- Boemi Chiefdom
- Mangbetu-Mabisanga Chiefdom
- Mangbere Chiefdom
- Manziga Chiefdom
- Okondo Chiefdom
- Kereboro Chiefdom
- Kopa Chiefdom
