= Dungu Territory =

Dungu
- Interactive map of Dungu
- Coordinates: 3.6172°N 28.5714°E
- Country: Democratic Republic of Congo
- Province: Haut-Uele

Area
  - Total: 32,446 km^{2} (12,527 sq mi)

Population
  - Total: 344,300
  - Density: 10.61/km^{2} (27.48/sq mi)
- Time zone: UTC+2 (CAT)
- National language: Lingala

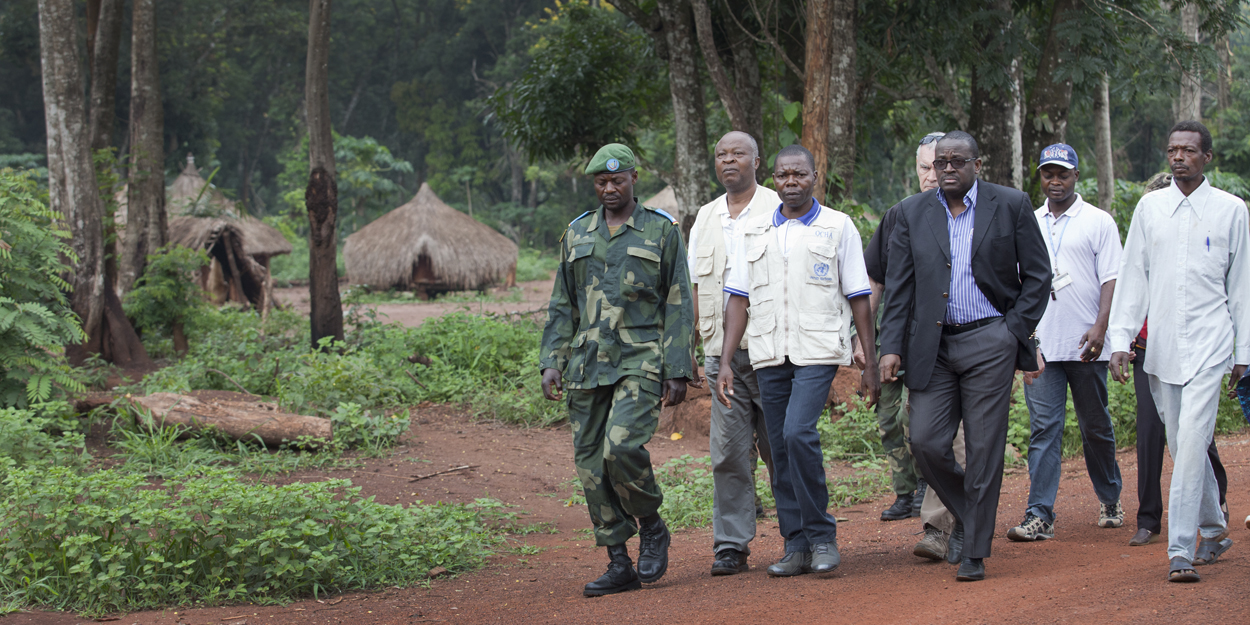
Humanitarian experts in Dungu in 2012

Dungu is a territory in the Haut-Uele Province of the Democratic Republic of the Congo. The administrative center is the town of Dungu, which lies on both sides of the Uele River. The territory is divided into the Ndoromo, Maringindo and Wandu chiefdoms.

Starting in September 2008, the Lord's Resistance Army (LRA) conducted a series of attacks on civilians in Dungu territory. By December that year there are more than 83,000 Internally Displaced Persons in the territory. An attack on Dungu city on 1 November 2008 caused 57,000 of its inhabitants to flee. The next month some had returned to the south of the city, but the northern section was deserted.

As of December 2008, the center of Dungu was isolated. Several access roads were not usable either due to their poor condition or for security reasons. The northern Dungu–Bitima axis (132 km) was unsafe. The southern axis towards Isiro was only accessible by bicycles, motorbikes or small vehicles. 180 kilometres (110 mi) of the road connecting Dungu to Bunia was in a poor condition.
