= Léon Roget =

Belgian soldier and colonial administrator

- Born: 21 June 1858; Brussels, Belgium
- Died: 4 February 1909 (aged 50); Brussels, Belgium
- Occupations: Soldier, colonial administrator
- Known for: Founder of the Force Publique

Léon Roget (21 June 1858 – 4 February 1909) was a Belgian soldier and colonial administrator who was active in the Congo Free State. He was the first commander of the Force Publique, the armed force used to police the colony.

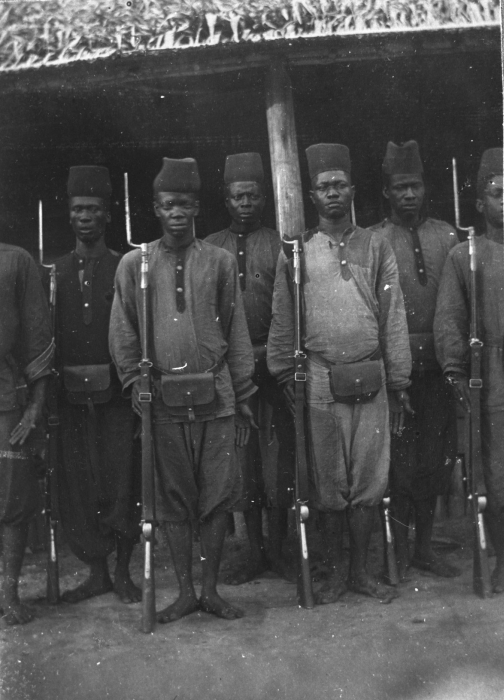
Force Publique troops

== Early years (1858–1886) ==
Léon Roget was born in Brussels on 21 June 1858. His parents were Théodore Roget and Antoinette Meganck. He joined the army on 28 September 1873. He entered the Military School on 4 April 1876, and graduated with the rank of infantry second lieutenant on 4 June 1878. After serving for several years he entered the War School, where he studied for three years and graduated as adjoint d'état-major on 8 December 1885. Soon after he was promoted to staff captain.

== First Congo term (1886–1888) ==
Roget was admitted to the service of the Congo Free State on 15 April 1886, and left for Africa on 28 June 1886. On 17 August 1886 he was appointed the first commander of the Force Publique. During his first term of service Roget stayed in Boma and devoted all his energy to creating and organizing the Force Publique, and to creating an artillery battery in Boma. Willem Frans Van Kerckhoven sent a first contingent of recruits for the Force Publique from the Bangalas. Camille Van den Plas led the first contingent of 84 Bangala soldiers, with 11 women, to Boma. Van den Plas was made responsible for training the Bangalas recruits under the orders of Roget. Henri Avaert reached Banana on 13 March 1886 and was assigned to Vivi. Soon after he was sent to Boma and was made deputy to Roget to help organize the first Bangalas contingent of the Force Publique.

The number of troops grew quickly, and they proved capable of maintaining order, escorting supply caravans and supporting expeditions of exploration. By the time Roget returned for his second term of service there were 600 trained soldiers. They included volunteers and forced recruits from annual levies. They were organized into eight companies, distributed among the districts, with three training centers charged with supplying men to the companies. Roget left for leave in Belgium on 21 October 1888.

== Second Congo term (1889–1890) ==
King Leopold II wanted to prevent the constant incursions of Arab slave traders, and decided to create an entrenched camp on the Aruwimi River and another on the Lomami River. Jules Alexandre Milz arrived in Boma on 25 July 1888 as an officer of the Force Publique and was assigned to the Bangala District, where Van Kerckhoven was preparing an expedition to establish entrenched camps on the Aruwimi River and Sankuru River for defense against Arab slavers. Milz left Bangala on 24 October 1888 with the column led by Francis Dhanis. The column founded posts at Umangi, Upoto and Yambuya. On 8 February 1889 the column was at the confluence of the Aruwimi with the Congo River, where the Basoko station was established, capital of the new Aruwimi-Uele District. The expedition then founded the posts of Bomane, Bassoa and Yambisi. (Note: Yambisi. This village was destroyed by a punitive Belgian expedition in June 1895. Louis Leclercq, a Force Publique officer, reported that he found the village abandoned, but when his soldiers scoured the area they returned with 11 heads and 9 prisoners. More heads and prisoners were taken before they burned the village.)

Roget was appointed district commissioner 1st class on 23 March 1889. He left for the Congo on 11 April 1889 and reached Boma on 15 May 1889. Roget was charged with building the camp at Basoko. It was intended to block further westward movement by the Arabs, and to serve as a base for offensive action against them. Roget took command there on 28 July 1889. Roget created a model entrenched camp at Basoko. Strong defenses were developed quickly, including batteries of artillery. However, from this base Roget could not prevent the Arabs from circulating through the vast territory of the eastern Congo Basin. He was instructed to use Arab guides to travel to the north of the Uele, and to establish friendly relations with the sultans of that region to prevent them from allying with the Zanzibari Arabs.

In April 1890 Milz and Joseph Duvivier accompanied Roget to found a post in Djabir (Bondo (Note: At the time, towns and villages were given the names of their chiefs. Djabir, named after the Sultan Djabir, was later called Bakango and today is called Bondo.)) on the Uele. They established the Ibembo station on the Itimbiri River, where they left Duvivier in command. Milz went on with Roget to the Go rapids, then overland to the Likati River where they founded the Ekwangatana post. They entrusted this post to an African officer. They returned to Ibembo, then went NNE towards the upper Likati and Djabir, crossing the Tinda River basin. They founded Mopocho between Ibembo and the Likati on 23 May 1890, which they also entrusted to an African officer. On 25 May 1890 they crossed the Likati and on 27 May 1890 reached the Uele River opposite Sultan Djabir's village. Sultan Djabir signed a treaty with Milz and a post was established on the site of the former Egyptian zeriba of Deleb.

Milz began construction of the station while Roget, guided by Sultan Djabir, tried unsuccessfully to join Alphonse van Gèle in Yakoma. Roget had gone north as far as Mbili and Gangu, having heard that the country downstream was too dangerous. On 9 June 1890 he returned to Djabir. Roget left Djabir in July to return to Basoko, leaving Milz in command with instructions to attempt the liaison with Yakoma. He returned to Basoko suffering from bouts of haematuric fever, and was ordered by the doctor to return to the coast. He embarked at Boma on 25 October 1890 and reached Belgium on 12 December 1890.

== Later career (1890–1909) ==
Roget returned to the army, and taught at the War School. He was then appointed to represent Belgian interests in the Compagnie à charte du Mozambique. He was made managing director of this company in Lisbon, made two visits to the company's territories as inspector general of the company, then took over the general direction in Lisbon. He returned to Africa between December 1905 and August 1906 as administrator of the Compagnie des Magasins Généraux du Congo to inspect and organize the company's establishments. He was also appointed an administrator of the Compagnie pour le Commerce et l'Industrie. He was the first secretary general of the Belgian Society for Colonial Studies. In 1908 he went to Katanga via Cape Town and Rhodesia for the Compagnie Intertropicale. He contracted a respiratory disease on this trip from which he died in Brussels on 4 February 1909.

== Sources ==
- Hennequin, E. (November 1947), "ROGET (Léon)" (PDF), Biographie Coloniale Belge (in French), vol. I, Inst. roy. colon. belge, pp. col.788–792
- Coosemans, M. (20 May 1946), "MILZ (Jules-Alexandre)", Biographie Belge d'Outre-Mer (in French), vol. I, Académie Royale des Sciences d'Outre-Mer, pp. 697–701
- Coosemans, Marthe; Jadot, J. M. (15 June 1954), "AVAERT (Henri-Michel-Eugène)" (PDF), Biographie Coloniale Belge (in French), vol. V, Inst. roy. colon. belge, pp. col.20–24
- Hochschild, Adam (1999), "15. A Reckoning", King Leopold's Ghost: A Story of Greed, Terror and Heroism in Colonial Africa
- Kjerland, Kirsten Alsaker; Bertelsen, Bjørn Enge (1 November 2014), Navigating Colonial Orders: Norwegian Entrepreneurship in Africa and Oceania, Berghahn Books, ISBN 978-1-78238-540-0
- Lotar, R. P. L. (1937), La Grande Chronique de l'Ubangi (PDF), Institut Royal Colonial Beige
- Omasombo Tshonda, Jean, ed. (2011), Huat Uele : Trésor (PDF), Le Cri édition, Musée royal de l’Afrique centrale, ISBN 978-2-8710-6578-4
- Pardoen, A. (15 July 1947), "PLAS (VAN DEN) (Camille - ThéodoreJoseph)", Biographie Coloniale Belge (in French), vol. I, Inst. roy. colon. belge, pp. col. 758–760
