= Willem Frans Van Kerckhoven =

Belgian soldier, explorer and colonial administrator (1853–1892)

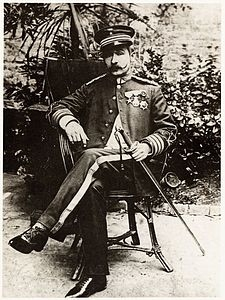
- Van Kerckhoven in the Congo
- Born: 28 January 1853; Mechelen, Belgium
- Died: 10 August 1892 (aged 39); Jebel Watti, Congo Free State
- Cause of death: Gunshot wound
- Occupations: Soldier, explorer, colonial administrator

Willem Frans Van Kerckhoven, or Guillaume François van Kerckhoven (28 January 1853 – 10 August 1892) was a Belgian soldier, explorer, colonial administrator who was active in the service of the International Association of the Congo and the subsequent Congo Free State. He is known for his extended expedition through the Uele River basin and onward towards the Nile, which was responsible for the deaths of over 1,800 people and established a Belgian presence in the region. Van Kerckhoven died in an accident before reaching the Nile.

== Early years (1853–1883) ==
Willem Frans Van Kerckhoven was born in Mechelen, Belgium, on 28 January 1853. His parents were Frans Van Kerckhoven and Jeanne-Catherine Miller. On 22 February 1869 he enlisted in the 6th line regiment. He was named second lieutenant in the 3rd line regiment on 17 April 1875. On 29 August 1878 he was admitted to the War College. On 21 February 1883, as a deputy staff lieutenant, he was seconded to the Military Cartographic Institute for service in the Congo.

== First Congo term: Bas Congo and Bangalas (1883–1886) ==
Van Kerckhoven left Liverpool on 7 March 1883 on the steamer Biafra, bound for the Congo. At Vivi on 24 April 1883 he was entrusted with transporting some material for the artillery to the upper Congo River. Henri Avaert was in command of the post in Isangila, which was to be the base for the Niari-Kwilu expedition led by Edmond Hanssens. Avaert's health was poor, and on 16 August 1883 he was replaced by Van Kerckhoven. Due to his energy and capability Van Kerckhoven was assigned various missions including purchase of land in Bas-Congo, recruitment of krooboys in Liberia and a 3-month exploration of the territory to the right of the Congo between Manyanga and Brazzaville. Guillaume Casman arrived in the Congo in January 1884, traveled up the right bank of the Congo to Mukumbi's huts which he reached on 19 February 1884. On 3 August 1884 he was visited there by Lieutenant Van Kerckhoven who had been relieved of his command at Isangila and was concluding treaties with the tribes around Mukumbi.

Van Kerckhoven passed through Léopoldville in April 1885, and was sent to succeed Camille Coquilhat in command of the Bangalas station, which he reached on 7 August 1885. The post had few soldiers and its position on the river bank was precarious. It was attacked by the local people, whom he managed to repel, and he strengthened the palisades. He managed to gain the support of the Iboko and Mabali chiefs. He began agricultural work, and the local Bangala people (Note: In the 19th century, before the creation of the Congo Free State, the Bangala (literally: 'river people') were a group of similar Bantu peoples living and trading along the bend of the Congo River that reached from Irebu at the mouth of the Ubangi River to the Mongala River.) gradually began to help with this.

Van Kerckhoven had gained enough confidence from the Bangalas that by the next year he was able to send a strong contingent of Bangala soldiers to Léopoldville. Ten of them went down to Boma to become the first Africans in the Force Publique, and later another 75 went down. Camille Van den Plas was responsible for leading the first contingent of 84 Bangala soldiers, with 11 women to Boma. Van Kerckhoven also sent a contingent to the Falls under his deputy Walter Deane to defend the post there, which was in danger of falling to Tippu Tip's Arabs. They did not succeed, and Deane and Dubois were forced to withdraw on 28 August 1886. Van Kerckhoven had left Bangalas by then. On 8 June 1886 he embarked in Boma to return to Europe at the end of his term of service.

== Bangalas District (1886–1890) ==
Van Kerckhoven applied for a second term, and in December 1886 passed through Lisbon on the Cabo Verde. He had been appointed district commissioner of Léopoldville. This base was well organized and required little attention. He was sent to organize and expand the territory around the Bangalas station that had recently been taken over by the state. In December 1888 he was appointed district commissioner 1st class. With the help of Ernest Baert and Francis Dhanis he began a large expansion in the region of rice, coffee and cocoa cultivation, built the first brick buildings and created new government posts.

Jules Alexandre Milz arrived in Boma on 25 July 1888 and was assigned to the Bangalas District, where Van Kerckhoven was preparing for the Léon Roget expedition to the north. The task was to establish entrenched camps on the Aruwimi River for defense against Arab slavers. Always on the move on the small steamer Association Internationale Africaine, Van Kerckhoven was the first European to ascend the Itimbiri River. He founded posts as far as the mouth of the Aruwimi, some headed by his deputies and some with small African garrisons. Van Kerckhoven was able to sign treaties with the local people throughout the territory, and to put an end to the influence of the Arabs.

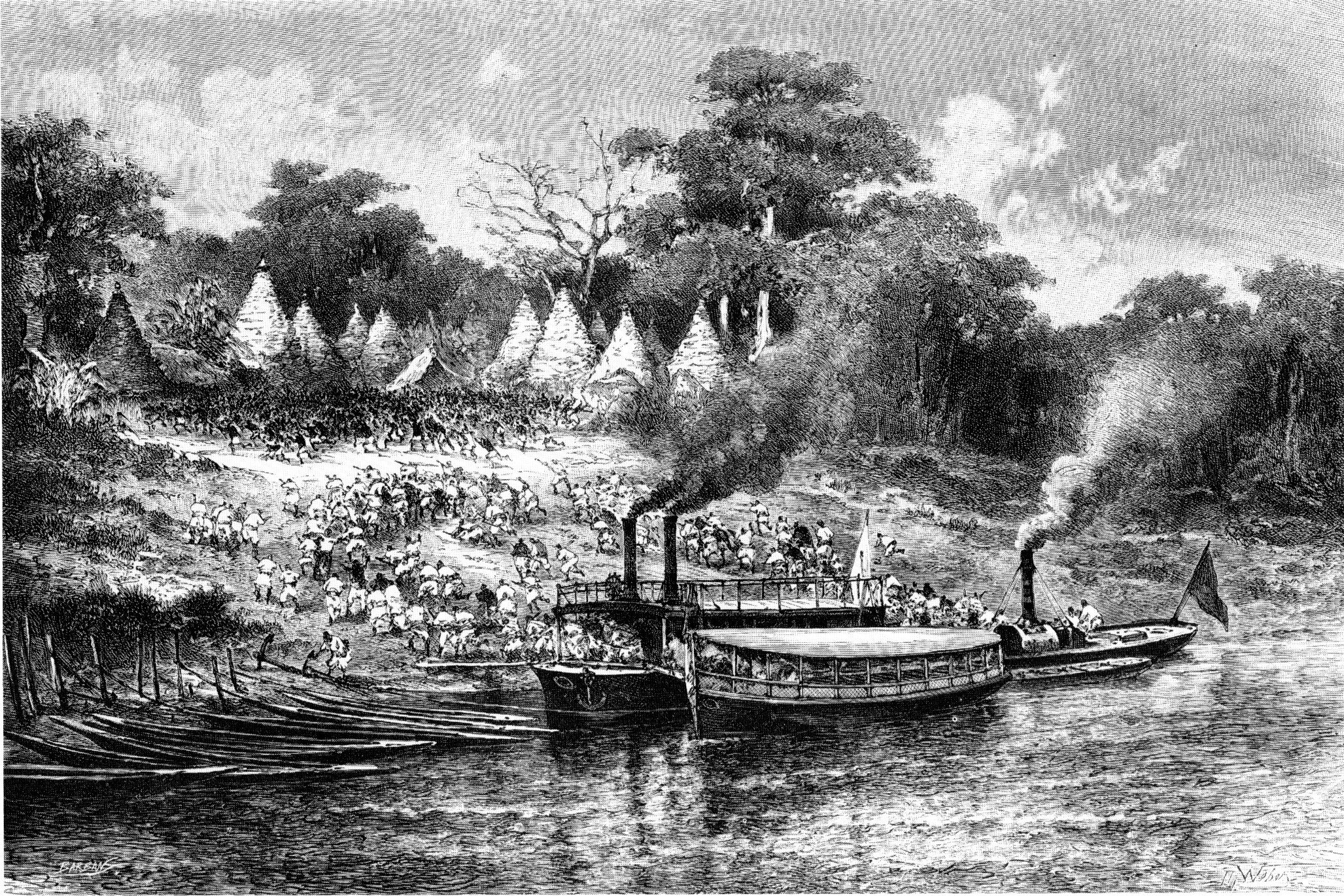
Relief expedition troops landing at Yambuya

Van Kerckhoven came to the aid of the rearguard of the Emin Pasha Relief Expedition under Major Edmund Musgrave Barttelot, in Yambuya on the Aruwimi, and gave it supplies so it could continue its journey. Van Kerckhoven met Tippu Tip (Note: The Arab Tippu Tip of Zanzibar had made successful slave raids in the eastern Congo basin, which attracted large numbers of Arabs. In an effort to stop their penetration, Henry Morton Stanley founded the Stanley Falls station in 1883, but in 1886 it was attacked and taken by the Arabs. In 1887 Tippu Tip was appointed governor of the Stanley Falls District, assisted by a resident European officer. In a second agreement that year, he undertook to provide porters to the Emin Pasha Relief Expedition.) in 1888, following which 400 porters were supplied for Barttelot. In his report to the governor general Van Kerckhoven recommended temporizing with the Arabs, but making every effort to prevent them from conquering territory upstream from the Bangalas, including a fortified camp at the mouth of the Aruwimi. In 1889 he supervised construction of this camp at Basoko. Later he accompanied Governor General Janssens to the Falls, where he acted as a mediator in the discussions. After this trip he returned via Léopoldville and Boma to Belgium, where he arrived on 2 January 1890.

== Nile expedition (1890–1892) ==
=== Preparation ===
At the time of Van Kerckhoven's Congo-Nile expedition, Arab slavers had occupied the Falls and were advancing northwest from there towards Djabir on the Uele River. King Léopold II had ordered Captain Roget to establish an entrenched fortification in Basoko, at the mouth of the Aruwimi, and from there to extend a line of protective post north. Roget and Milz had founded the Ibembo station on the Itimbiri, then had reached the Uele in Djabir at about the same time that Alphonse van Gèle had sailed up the Ubangi River to Yakoma, 180 kilometres (110 mi) downstream from Djabir. They had been unable to meet up, however, and Roget had returned to Europe. Léopold II now decided to send a strong expedition from the new bases to the Nile, blocking the north route to the Arabs and opening up a region that was still largely unexplored by Europeans since Wilhelm Junker's visit in 1871. Van Kerchhoven, now a captain-commandant, was named inspector of state and given command of the expedition. The force of about 500 well-armed African troops with artillery included 14 European officers and non-commissioned officers, two doctors, two clerks and three interpreters.

=== Journey to Djabir ===
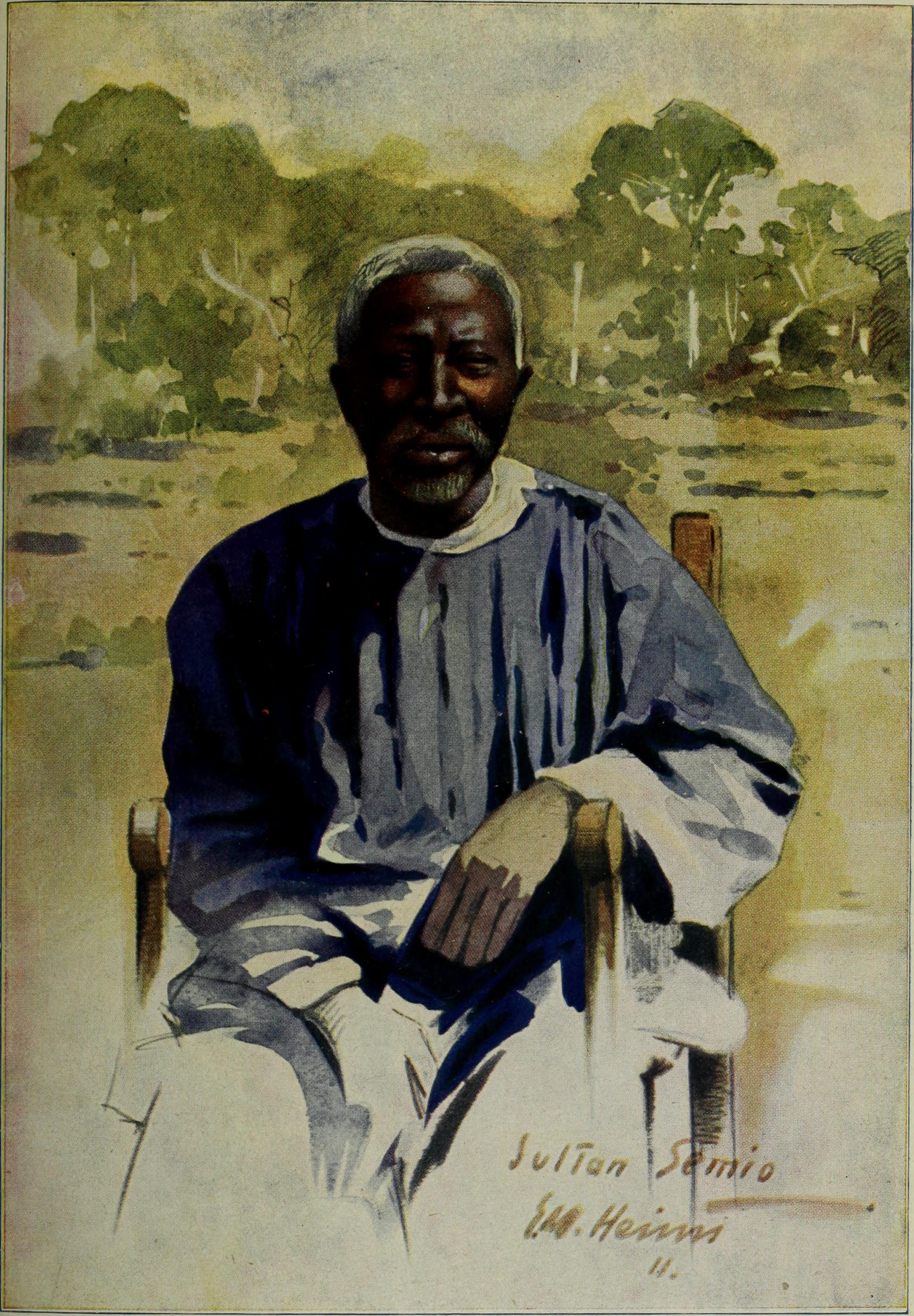
Semio, Sultan of the Asande Avungura. Water-colour by E. M. Heims, 1911

Van Kerckhoven reached Boma on 2 December 1890 and led the main body of troops to the concentration point at the Bumba River, a little downstream from the Itimbiri. Van Kerckhoven met Milz at Stanley Pool in March 1891. Milz's term was over, but agreed to accompany Van Kerckhoven back to the Uele as second in command of his expedition to the Nile. The expedition left Léopoldville on 4 February 1891. The vanguard under Captain Pierre Ponthier was sent by land to Djabir. Along the way he was attacked by Arabs supported by local people, who badly slowed his progress. Van Kerckhoven made a short visit to the Falls to try to allay the fears of the Arab Rachid, then took the bulk of his men to Djabir. At Ibembo he sent Milz to the Mbomou River to make every effort to gain the allegiance of Sultan Semio, who had been dealing with the Arab bands. At the start of July most of the Van Kerckhoven expedition had gathered in Djabir.

=== Djabir to Bomokandi ===
On 8 July the vanguard, still under Ponthier, began the march east through uncharted territory along the Uele. He established relay stations at points on both banks of the river with relatively little opposition from the local people or Arab slavers. He reached Bima and then the mouth of the Bomokandi River, where he established himself solidly. Van Kerckhoven had a more difficult journey. At the start, he had a fight with slavers who were defeated after reinforcements were supplied by Adhémar Daenen. Then he was attacked by the Ababuas along the river, and again had to call for help by Daenen, who met him with 40 men at the Bima.

Before going further Ponthier, with the approval of Van Kerckhoven, had to clear the country of Arabs. They had settled on the Makongo and on islands in the Bomokandi. He defeated them in some sharp engagements, helped by local people who could no longer tolerate the slavers. Van Kerckhoven also obtained political and military support from the local chiefs on the Mbomou. Lieutenant de la Kéthulle was sent to Rafaï in southern Darfur, and Lieutenant Foulon created a post in Sultan Sassa's territory. Milz sent Van Kerckhoven a message on 25 November announcing that Semio was now an ally, and on 25 November Milz and Semio arrived at Bomokandi camp with 600 soldiers and 500 porters.

=== Bomokandi to Niangara ===
Orders were given for the march to the Nile. Ponthier, Semio and his soldiers would go by land, while Milz would accompany Van Kerckhoven with the provisions by water. The columns left on 12 December 1891 and rejoined at Amadi on 22 December, where they started to build a post. The land force went through swampy country, covered with grassy hills along the ridge that separates the Uele and Bomokandi basins. The local people were not hostile, and when the Barambo chief found the expedition was not an Arab band he entered into an alliance and let Captain Daenen establish a station. The column led by Van Kerckhoven and Milz reached the location of Amadi on 22 December 1891 where they started to build a post. A column led by Milz traveled by land along the south bank of the Uele selecting sites for new posts, and reached the confluence of the Gada River with the Uele on 18 March 1892, where they chose to build a new station at the village of Mbegu, named Niangara. Van Kerckhoven arrived there on 25 March 1892, and Jean-Hubert Cloesen was placed in charge of the post.

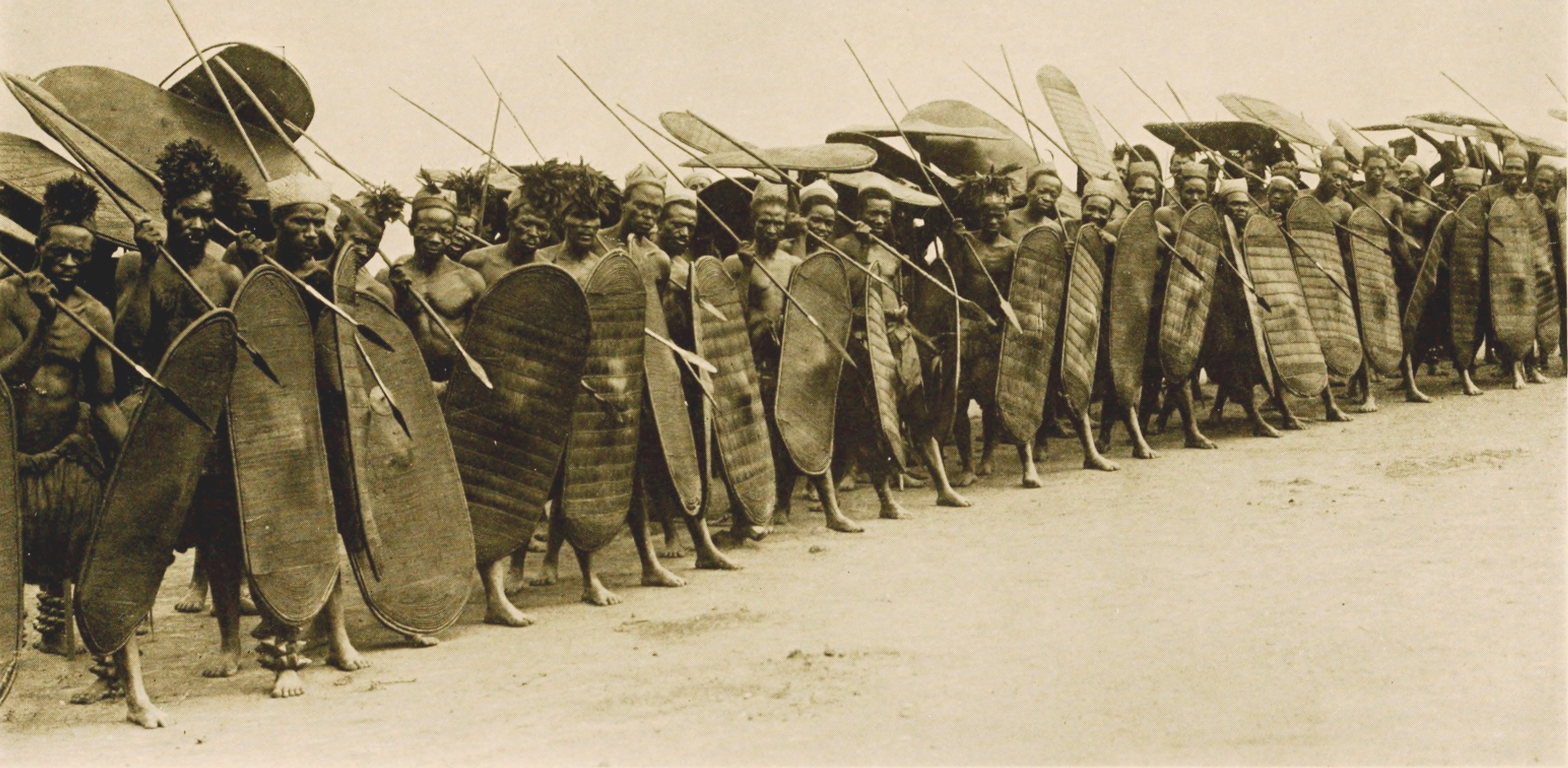
Azande, or "Niam-Niam", warriors of the Bomokandi region, showing off in Manziga's village, near Niangara

On 30 December 1891 Van Kerckhoven, Milz, Ponthier and others left Amadi and headed south. They were at the Mbe-Bomokandi confluence on 1 January 1892, where Ponthier fell sick and had to return via Djabir to Boma. After having obtained the submission of the main chiefs of the region, who had given them enough canoes, the expedition returned to Amadis on 24 January and moved out on 29 January. The flotilla was on the Bomokandi on 2 February 1892. Milz, Gustave Gustin, Clément-François Vande Vliet and Semio, who had traveled by land along the south bank of the Uele, were attacked by the Barambo. They continued, making contact with the local chiefs and selecting sites for new posts, and reached the confluence of the Gada River with the Uele on 18 March, where they chose to build a new station at the village of Mbegu, named Niangara. Van Kerckhoven arrived there on 25 March 1892, and Jean-Hubert Cloesen was placed in charge of the post.

=== Onward from Niangara ===
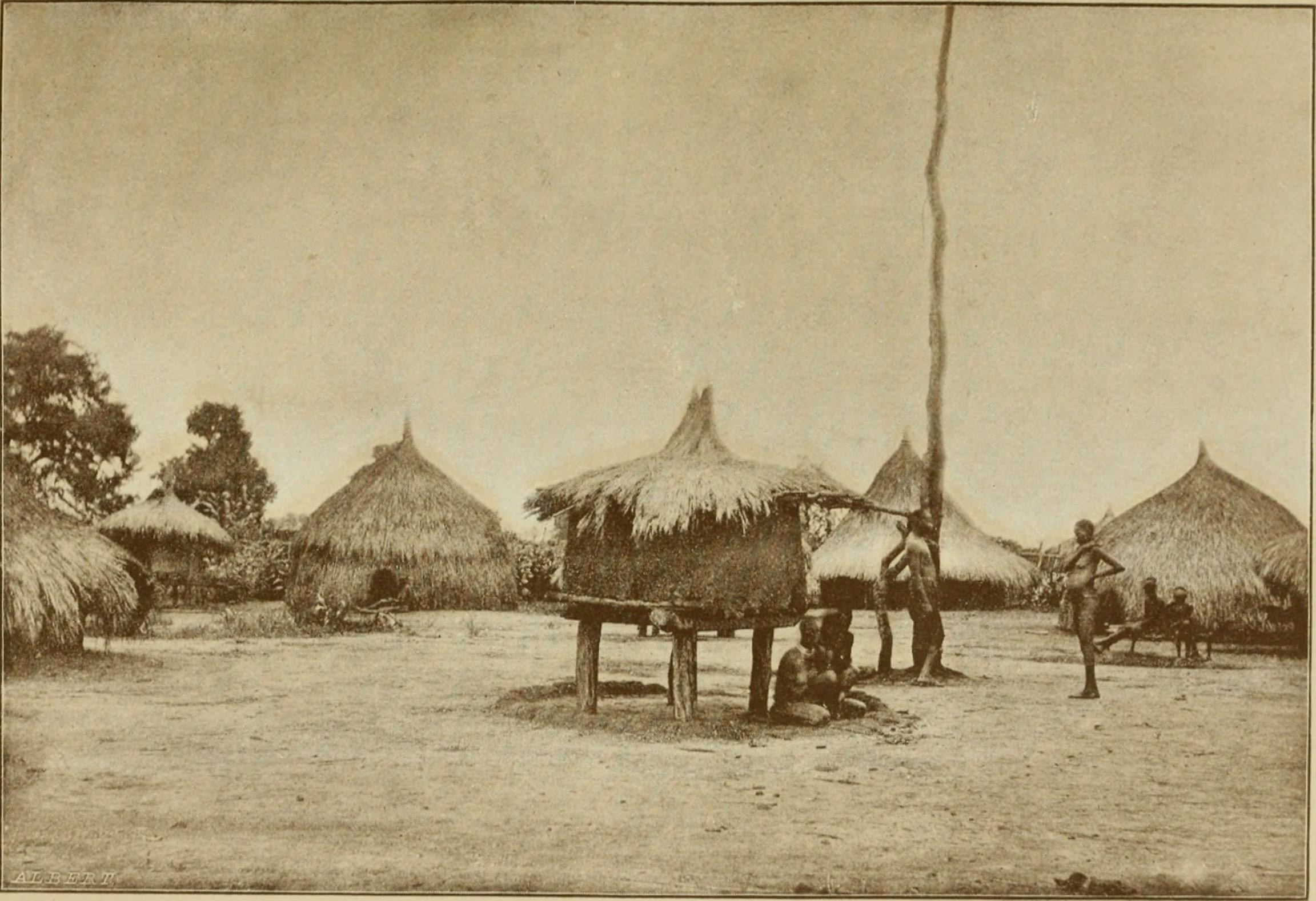
Village of the Logo people

On April 7 the vanguard continued its march. It was led by Gustin, with four Europeans, 250 soldiers, and Semio with his force. It left Van Kerckhoven, who was bedridden, behind in Niangara. He was suffering from haematuric fever, and was unable to leave until 18 April 1892. He reached the Kibali-Dungu confluence on 28 April 1892, and on 28 April 1892 reached the Mbittima zériba, at 29°E on the south bank of the Kibali. There he received the submission of Wanfo, an old Vongar chief. On 6 June Van Kerckhoven, Milz, Montangie and Van de Vliet left Mbittima by canoe. On 10 June 1892 they reached Surur at the confluence of the Kibali and the Nzoro River, and decided to ascend the Nzoro. The country became mountainous. Although the Nzoro was 50–75 metres (164–246 ft) wide, only short sections were navigable, interrupted by falls and rapids that often extended for several kilometres. There were some skirmishes with the Logos of the north of the Nzoro.

The leading column under Gustin and Semio lost contact with the rear column on 300 men under Van Kerckhoven, Milz, Montangie and Van de Vliet. Gustin and Semio often had to fight, and found the local people had destroyed all food supplies. Supplies and porterage presented problems to Van Kerckhoven's main column. It was divided, leaving 200 of the less able-bodied men at the foot of the rapids, while the others went ahead in search of the Gustin-Semio advance guard. Some of the baggage had to be returned to Mbittima, and the column had to force its way through. On 11 July Van Kerckhoven and Milz left by land along the south bank of the Nzoro through difficult country, with the soldiers carrying their loads for lack of porters. They reached Tagomolanghi on 25 July 1892.

On 2 August 1892, short of food, the expedition pushed on towards the Kibbi, which was said to be close to Wadelai, near the Nile. After 20 kilometres (12 mi) the expedition passed the headwaters of the Kibbi and left the Uele basin. Supplies of food were found, and the column pushed on to the east. On 9 August 1892 they were about 15 kilometres (9.3 mi) south of Mount Beka on the Congo-Nile watershed, near Mount Wati. Kerckhoven died in Djebel Watti on 10 August 1892. On that day the column was attacked by local people at daybreak. During the skirmish the boy who carried Van Kerckhoven's rifle accidentally fired it while reloading, and shot Van Kerckhoven in the back at level of his heart. He died almost immediately. Van Kerckhoven was buried there and Milz took command. He continued to the Nile, and reached the final goal of the journey in Wadelai on 4 October 1892.

== Legacy ==
A governor general of the Congo described Van Kerckhoven as "a hurricane which passed through the countryside leaving nothing but devastation behind it." In 1887 Van Kerckhoven told a fellow passenger on a steamboat, Roger Casement, that he paid his African soldiers a small fee for every rebel head they brought him after a battle, "to stimulate their prowess in the face of the enemy." Casement later became known for exposing the brutal regime in the Congo Free State. He was a close friend of Joseph Conrad, and his account may have influenced Conrad's depiction of Kurtz in his Heart of Darkness. The Uele-Nile expedition confiscated ivory worth hundreds of thousands of francs, for which it became notorious, and killed about 1,800 men. The subsequent "Arab Wars" that lasted until 1894 were in part due to its actions. However, the historian Albert Chapaux considered that Van Kerckhoven was among the leading figures in the "development" of the Congo Free State.

== Sources ==
- Boulger, Demetrius Charles (2012), The Congo State: Or, the Growth of Civilisation in Central Africa, Cambridge University Press, ISBN 978-1-108-05069-2
- Bradshaw, Richard; Fandos-Rius, Juan (2016), Historical Dictionary of the Central African Republic, Rowman & Littlefield Publishers, ISBN 978-0-8108-7992-8
- Coosemans, M. (20 May 1946), "Milz (Jules-Alexandre)", Biographie Belge d'Outre-Mer (in French), vol. I, Académie Royale des Sciences d'Outre-Mer, pp. 697–701
- Coosemans, M. (21 May 1948), "Casman (Guillaume-Camille)" (PDF), Biographie Belge d'Outre-Mer (in French), vol. II, Académie Royale des Sciences d'Outre-Mer, pp. 143–147
- Coosemans, Marthe; Jadot, J. M. (15 June 1954), "Avert (Henri-Michel-Eugène)" (PDF), Biographie Coloniale Belge (in French), vol. V, Inst. roy. colon. belge, pp. col.20–24
- Firchow, Peter Edgerly (2014), Envisioning Africa: Racism and Imperialism in Conrad's Heart of Darkness, University Press of Kentucky, ISBN 978-0-8131-4975-2
- Gambier, R. (26 November 1947), "Kerckhoven (Van) (Guillaume François)", Biographie Coloniale Belge (in French), vol. I, Inst. roy. colon. belge, pp. col. 566–573
- Hochschild, Adam (2012), "Introduction", Heart of Darkness by Joseph Conrad: (Penguin Classics Deluxe Edition), Penguin Publishing Group, ISBN 978-1-101-61368-9
- Kennedy, Pagan (2013), Black Livingstone: A True Tale of Adventure in the Nineteenth-Century Congo, Santa Fe Writer's Project, ISBN 978-0-9882252-4-4
- Pardoen, A. (15 July 1947), "PLAS (VAN DEN) (Camille – ThéodoreJoseph)", Biographie Coloniale Belge (in French), vol. I, Inst. roy. colon. belge, pp. col. 758–760
- Salmon, Pierre (1979), "Reviewed Work(s): Le voyage de Van Kerckhoven aux Stanley Falls et au camp de Yambuya (1888)", Studia Diplomatica (in French), 32 (6), Egmont Institute: 682, JSTOR 44839234
- Samarin, William J. (1982), "Colonization and Pidginization on the Ubangi River", Journal of African Languages and Linguistics, 4 (1): 1–42, doi:10.1515/jall.1982.4.1.1, hdl:1807/67139, ISSN 0167-6164, S2CID 143587867
