= Ernest Baert =

Belgian soldier, explorer and colonial administrator (1860–1894)

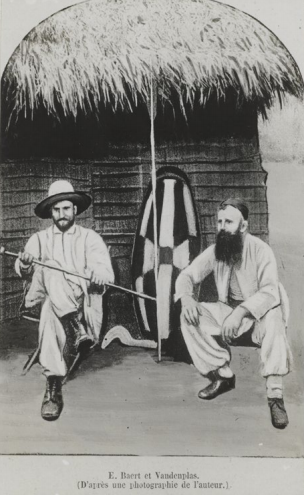
- Baert and Camille Van den Plas from Camille Coquilhat, Sur le Haut Congo 1882–1886, Paris, 1888
- Born: 12 August 1860; Brussels, Belgium
- Died: 15 August 1894 (aged 34); Dungu, Congo Free State
- Occupations: Soldier, explorer and colonial administrator

Ernest Baert (12 August 1860 – 15 August 1894) was a Belgian soldier, explorer and colonial administrator who was active in the Congo Free State.

== Early years (1860–1885) ==
Ernest Baert was born in Brussels on 12 August 1860. His parents were Polydore Baert and Emilie-Bernardine Duvieusart. He entered the Ecole Militaire on 4 December 1876. He was appointed second lieutenant on 22 December 1878 and assigned on 19 April 1881 to the 5th artillery regiment. He was seconded to the Military Cartographic Institute, and entered service with the International Association of the Congo on 16 June 1885.

== First Congo term (1885–1888) ==
Baert embarked on 29 June 1885 at Antwerp on the Baltimore and arrived at Banana on 28 July 1885 He reached Vivi on 2 August 1885. He was assigned to the study of the Bas-Congo railway line, then assigned to the topographic brigade. He spent the first part of his term in the Bas-Congo. He was appointed to replace Willem Frans Van Kerckhoven at the Bangalas station, which he reached on 28 April 1886.

The former station head, Camille Coquilhat, was fairly diplomatic and had relied on agreements with the local people and the protection of the chief Mata-Boike, with whom he had exchanged blood.After Mata-Boike's death in 1886, the inhabitants of the station felt threatened and began to use force against the neighboring villages. The European leaders at the time, Baert and Van Kerckhoven, were no longer bound by blood pacts. They set out to bring the local population into total submission. Baert attacked the Bapoto of Lisala on the pretext of the release of the soldiers captured by the Bapoto. Van Kerckhoven subdued the villages in the South to end the slave trade on the Lulonga River.

Baert undertook two explorations of the Mongala River despite the hostility of the local people, who attempted to capture the steamers. He left Bangala on 23 November 1886 and ascended the Mongala on the A.I.A. for 66 hours to the furthest point reached by his predecessors George Grenfell and Camille Coquilhat. The large local population became increasingly hostile as the expedition advanced, and attacked it several times. He reached Mongwandi (Businga) and the Ebola-Dua confluence on 1 December 1886, and founded a station at Moboika before returning to Bangalas. He had shown that the Mongala could be used as a route to reach the Ubangi and Uele rivers. Baert made many improvements to the post of Bangalas. He set up sites for the manufacture of tiles and paving stones, and increased the cultivation of coffee and cotton. He was replaced at Bangalas by Hubert Lothaire.

Accompanied by Tippu Tip Baert traveled by land, in a particularly marshy region, from Yambuya on the Aruwimi River to Yangambi on the Congo River in four stages of 8–11 hours of walking. He reached Yangambi on 17 January 1888. At the end of his term of service he went down to Boma, then to Banana on 20 June 1888, where he embarked for Europe. On his return to Belgium he was received by the king and queen, who congratulated him on his explorations.

== Second Congo term (1889–1892) ==

Baert was appointed a district commissioner, left Antwerp on 18 May 1889 on the Lualaba and reached Boma on 19 June 1889. He took over the Bangalas district from Van Kerkhoven on 8 October 1889. He continued his predecessor's system of using rivers to expand power into the interior. At the start of 1890 he went up the Lulonga River to the Maringa River, ascended the Maringa and founded a post in Bauru "to combat and prevent incursions by bands of slavers." He founded the Basankusu post at the confluence of the Maringa and the Lopori in May 1890 to stop the Arab raids and put an end to cannibalism and the slave trade. He left Lothaire in command of the post. At first the local people fully supported the pacification of the region, but later the Belgians began a policy of oppression and terror against villages that did not harvest the required amount of rubber.

In 1890 he founded the post of Mongwandi at Businga on the Mongala. During an exploration of the Itimbiri River, below the Go Rapids Baert met Jérôme Becker and Sultan Djabir who were going to Djabir's residence on the Zagiri River, a tributary of the Uele River. Baert explored the Lopori River and founded a station at the confluence of this river and the Maringa, at Basankusu. He then handed over command to Lieutenant Lothaire at the end of his second term, and returned to Europe on 30 April 1892.

== Last Congo term (1892–1894) ==
Baert was promoted to state inspector. He left Antwerp on the Lualaba on 6 January 1893, and reached Boma on 1 February 1893. When news came than Van Kerckhoven had died, he was appointed to take over the Haut Uele Expedition and planned to reach the Nile by way of Lake Albert. He arrive in Djabir on 2 June 1893. Florimond Delanghe had succeeded Jules Alexandre Milz as commander of the Haut-Uele Expedition, and had reached the Nile. Hearing of Baert's arrival, Delanghe left Laboré on 17 August 1893 to take Aléma and Ganda, taking with him the contingents of the Force Publique that Baert had requested. Baert had been ordered by the king to evacuate the posts from the Nile and focus on consolidating the positions acquired in the Uele basin. However, Baert intended to settle at Kavalli on Lake Albert as soon as possible, to forestall Gerald Portal advancing from Uganda.

Rather than travel to the Nile at Dufilé and then ascend to Lake Albert, Baert decided to take a short route from Ganda to Kavalli through the mountains, risking supply problems and hostile local people. Baert and Ray left Dungu on 14 August 1893 with 86 African soldiers. At Bokoyo they were joined by 350 Azande auxiliaries. They reached Mundu on 28 August 1893. On 21 September 1893 Delanghe was in Ganda, where he heard that Baert was preparing to leave Mundu for Magora and Ganda with Bonvallet, Van Holsbeek, Delmotte and Ray. At Magora difficulties began with the irregulars, some of whom deserted. The Azande from Bokoyo refused to march. On 15 November he wrote to Delange saying he would not advance from Magora.

Delanghe, who was recovering from hematuria, therefore had himself carried in a hammock from Ganda to join Baert in Magora. He reached there on 4 December 1893 to find that Baert and Gustin had left for Mundu. Delanghe reached Mundu on 11 December 1893. The forces there were suffering from famine. Baert disarmed the Azande irregulars, but some revolted and attacked the station head Dautzenberg, who required aid from Bonvalet to escape. On 1 January 1894, Baert decided to return to Niangara to prepare a new program for occupying Haut Uele, and to give up maintenance of garrisons in the Lado Enclave and perhaps even on the upper Dungu River. With almost all the garrisons of Haut Uele in revolt, Baert left Mundu for Niangara on 22 January 1894. The Bonvalet-Devos column, which had been told to evacuate the posts east of Dungu, was massacred on 2 March 1894.

Baert waited at Niangara for reinforcements so he could again move east, but all available forces were fighting the Arabs in the north of Maniema. Baert therefore decided to abandon all the posts upstream from Djabir and Ibembo apart from Dungu, Akka, Mundu and Gombari. He planned to supply Gombari by a route from the Ituri River to serve as a supply base for operations towards Lake Albert and Bahr-el-Djebel that could be used to reoccupy the Enclave. Baert reached Dungu on 7 July 1894 with Francqui, who was to take over command of Uele District from Delanghe and assist the Nile expedition. Exhausted and suffering from hematuria, Baert died in Dungu on 15 August 1894. In November 1894 Paul Lemarînel succeeded him in command of the Uele region.

== Sources ==
- Boelaert, Edmond; Vinck, H. (1988), "Les Debuts de la S.A.B. a l'Equateur (Zaïre)", Annales Aequatoria (in French), 9, Honoré Vinck: 51–69, JSTOR 25836481
- Coosemans, M. (1948b), "Baert (Ernest)", Biographie Coloniale Belge (in French), vol. I, Inst. roy. colon. belge, pp. col. 54–57
- Lonkama, Ekonyo Bandɛngɔ (1990), "Elements pour une ethno-histoire de Basankusu (Equateur, Zaire) En marge d'un centenaire (1890–1990)", Annales Aequatoria (in French), 11, Honoré Vinck: 365–408, JSTOR 25836579
- Omasombo Tshonda, Jean (2015), Mongala (PDF) (in French), Musée royal de l’Afrique centrale
