= Jules Alexandre Milz =

Belgian soldier (1861–1902)

- Born: 10 September 1861; Virton, Belgium
- Died: 1 October 1902 (aged 41); Brussels, Belgium
- Occupations: Soldier, explorer

Jules Alexandre Milz (10 September 1861 – 1 October 1902) was a Belgian soldier who was active in exploring the northeast of the Congo Free State. He traveled extensively in Uele District, where he resolved the question of whether the Uele River was the upper portion of the Ubangi River. He was second in command of an expedition to the Nile in 1891–1892, and took over command after the leader died.

== Early years (1861–1888) ==
Jules Alexandre Milz was born in Virton in Belgian Lorraine on 10 September 1861. His parents were Jacques Milz and Joséphine Philippart. He joined the 2nd Mounted Chasseurs on 20 August 1880, and was appointed second lieutenant to the 4th Lancers on 29 June 1883. He entered the service of the Congo Free State in 1888.

== Roget Expedition (1888–1891) ==
Locations in the Congo

On 17 June 1888 Milz left Antwerp as an officer of the Force Publique. He arrived in Boma on 25 July 1888 and was assigned to the Bangalas District, where Willem Frans Van Kerckhoven was preparing the vanguard of the Léon Roget expedition. The task was to establish entrenched camps on the Aruwimi River and Sankuru River for defense against Arab slavers. Milz left Bangala on 24 October 1888 with the column led by Francis Dhanis. The column founded posts at Umangi, Upoto and Yambuya. On 8 February 1889 the column was at the confluence of the Aruwimi with the Congo River, where the Basoko station was established, capital of the new Aruwimi-Uele District. Roget took command there on 28 July 1889.

The expedition then founded the posts of Bomane, Bassoa and Yambisi. (Note: Yambisi. This village was destroyed by a punitive Belgian expedition in June 1895. Louis Leclercq, a Force Publique officer, reported that he found the village abandoned, but when his soldiers scoured the area they returned with 11 heads and 9 prisoners. More heads and prisoners were taken before they burned the village.) Milz was put in charge of Bomane, then of Bassoa. In April 1890 Milz and Joseph Duvivier accompanied Roget to found a post in Djabir (Bondo (Note: At the time, towns and villages were given the names of their chiefs. Djabir, named after the Sultan Djabir, was later called Bakango and today is called Bondo.)) on the Uele. They established the Ibembo station on the Itimbiri River, where they left Duvivier in command. Milz went on with Roget to the Go rapids, then overland to the Likati River where they founded the Ekwangatana post. They entrusted this post to an African officer. They returned to Ibembo, then went NNE towards the upper Likati and Djabir, crossing the Tinda River basin. They founded Mopocho between Ibembo and the Likati on 23 May 1890, which they also entrusted to an African officer. On 25 May 1890 they crossed the Likati and on 27 May 1890 reached the Uele River opposite Sultan Djabar's village. Sultan Djabir signed a treaty with Milz and a post was established on the site of the former Egyptian zeriba of Deleb.

Milz began construction of the station while Roget, guided by Sultan Djabir, tried unsuccessfully to join Alphonse van Gèle in Yakoma. Roget had gone north as far as Mbili and Gangu, having heard that the country downstream was too dangerous. On 9 June 1890 he returned to Djabir. Roget left Djabir in July to return to Basoko, the Pool and Boma, leaving Milz in command with instructions to attempt the liaison with Yakoma. In July–August 1890 Milz and his assistant Mahutte and Sultan Djabir led 100 fusiliers and 400 lancers in an attempt to push through the non-submissive people along the right bank, but were forced to return to Djabir after nine days.

In September Milz had to repel an attack by the Arabs under Kipanga-Panga. There are conflicting reports about who took the initiative, but it seems that Van Gèle heard of the presence of a European in Djabar on November 18 and set out via a roundabout route up the Uele, reaching the village of Gamanza on 2 December. The next day he met Milz, who was coming to meet him. This resolved the Ubangi-Uele question. (Note: It had earlier been thought possible that the Uele might feed the Benue River or perhaps Lake Chad, but now it was thought likely that it was the upper part of the Ubangi. Milz and Van Gèle showed that was the case.) Milz and Van Gèle heard that the Arabs were operating in the lower Bima River and on the Rubi River and set out for that region. In December 1890 they succeeded in expelling the Muslim traders.

== Nile Expedition (1891–1892) ==
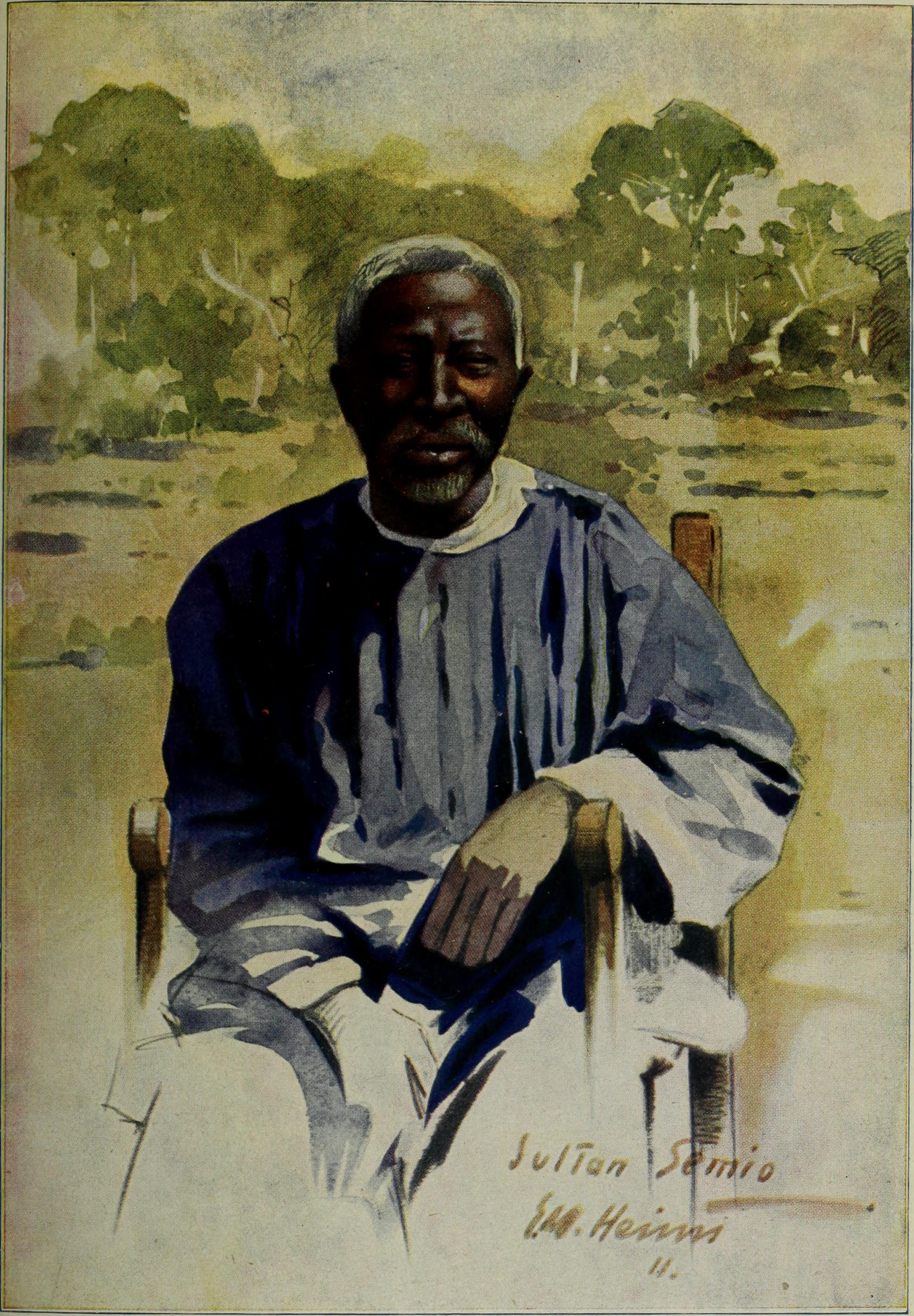
Semio, Sultan of the Asande Avungura. Water-colour by E. M. Heims, 1911

When Milz's term was over he went to Stanley Pool. There, in March 1891, Van Kerckhoven asked him to return to the Uele to become second in command of his expedition to the Nile. Milz accepted and was in Basoko by 26 March 1891. At the start of July most of the Van Kerckhoven expedition had gathered in Djabir, consisting of 15 Europeans and 500 Africans of the Force Publique. The vanguard, led by Pierre Ponthier, set off upstream on 7 July 1891. In August Milz was sent to visit Sultan Semio to obtain his help for the expedition. Milz sent Van Kerckhoven a message on 25 November announcing that Semio was now an ally, and on 25 November Milz and Semo arrived at Bomokandi camp with 600 soldiers and 500 porters.

Orders were given for the march to the Nile. Ponthier, Semio and his soldiers would go by land, while Milz would accompany Van Kerckhoven with the provisions by water. The columns left on 12 December and rejoined at Amadi on 22 December, where they started to build a post. On 30 December 1891 Van Kerckhoven, Milz, Ponthier and others left Amadi and headed south. They were at the Mbe-Bomokandi confluence on 1 January 1892, where Ponthier fell sick and had to return via Djabir to Boma. After having obtained the submission of the main chiefs of the region, who had given them enough canoes, the expedition returned to Amadis on 24 January and moved out on 29 January. The flotilla was on the Bomokandi on 2 February 1892. Milz, Gustave Gustin, Clément-François Van de Vliet and Semio, who had traveled by land along the south bank of the Uele, were attacked by the Barambo. They continued, making contact with the local chiefs and selecting sites for new posts, and reached the confluence of the Gada River with the Uele on 18 March, where they chose to build a new station at the village of Mbegu, named Niangara. Van Kerckhoven arrived there on 25 March 1892, and Jean-Hubert Cloesen was placed in charge of the post.

On April 7 the vanguard continued its march, leaving Van Kerckhoven, who was bedridden, behind in Niangara. Milz and Van de Vliet, who had come from Niangara to Bomokandi, left Bomokandi on 22 April and reached Mbittima on 2 June. Semio was sent in advance to prepare the populations. On 6 June Van Kerckhoven, Milz, Montangie and Van de Vliet left Mbittima by canoe. They reached Surur on 10 June and decided to go up the Nzoro River, but found it blocked by rapids, which were called the Milz Falls. The column was divided, leaving 200 of the less able-bodied men at the foot of the rapids, while the others went ahead in search of the Gustin-Semio advance guard. On 11 July Van Kerckhoven and Milz left by land along the south bank of the Nzoro through difficult country, with the soldiers carrying their loads for lack of porters. They reached Tagomolanghi on 25 July 1892.

Van Kerckhoven died in Djebel Watti on 10 August 1892. He was accidentally killed by a shot from the gun his boy was reloading. He was buried there and Milz took command. Leaving Mount Beka on 12 August 1892, the expedition soon reached the Khor Arave, a tributary of the Nile. They made camp and sent a scouting party towards the Nile. On 19 August Milz was at Mount Lehmin, among the Kakwas. On 24 August he found the Kibbi River, where he set up a camp named Fort Lehmin. He continued northeast, and reached the old Egyptian zeriba of Ganda where he installed Gustin. In October 1892 he reached Wadelai on the Nile to the north of Lake Albert. He enlisted soldiers of Emin Pasha whom he found remaining in the region, but they proved unreliable. Under pressure from the Mahdists he was forced to withdraw.

Milz made his way west towards the Dungu River. He left Semio in Ndirfi, and continued towards Faraki on the upper Dungu. He set up the Faradje post a small distance upstream from Mundu. On 18 December 1892 he reached the Dungu-Kibali confluence, the head of the Uele, where Florimond Delanghe was waiting to take over command of the expedition. Milz began to develop a post that was named Dungu.

== Later career (1893–1901) ==
On 20 January 1893 Milz officially handed over command of the Nile and Haut-Uele posts to Delanghe. (Note: Delanghe made a fresh advance to the Nile and established several posts there in the summer of 1892, but also had to retreat from the Mahdists and return to Dungu while under attack by hostile local tribesmen.) He went with Delanghe to Niangara, which he reached on 17 February. He returned to Boma on 23 October 1893, and embarked from Cabinda on 28 October. Milz was appointed captain of the 1st Regiment of Guides. On 30 June 1900 he left again for Africa, charged with a special mission to delimit the Belgian-German border in Kivu. He returned to Europe on 27 July 1901. He died in Brussels of angina pectoris on 1 October 1902.

== Sources ==
- Bradshaw, Richard; Fandos-Rius, Juan (27 May 2016), Historical Dictionary of the Central African Republic, Rowman & Littlefield Publishers, ISBN 978-0-8108-7992-8
- Coosemans, M. (20 May 1946), "MILZ (Jules-Alexandre)", Biographie Belge d'Outre-Mer (in French), vol. I, Académie Royale des Sciences d'Outre-Mer, pp. 697–701
- Ewans, Martin (28 July 2017), European Atrocity, African Catastrophe: Leopold II, the Congo Free State and its Aftermath, Taylor & Francis, ISBN 978-1-317-84907-0
- Hochschild, Adam (1999), "15. A Reckoning", King Leopold's Ghost: A Story of Greed, Terror and Heroism in Colonial Africa
- Kjerland, Kirsten Alsaker; Bertelsen, Bjørn Enge (1 November 2014), Navigating Colonial Orders: Norwegian Entrepreneurship in Africa and Oceania, Berghahn Books, ISBN 978-1-78238-540-0
- Lotar, R. P. L. (1937), La Grande Chronique de l'Ubangi (PDF), Institut Royal Colonial Beige
- Omasombo Tshonda, Jean, ed. (2011), Huat Uele : Trésor (PDF), Le Cri édition, Musée royal de l’Afrique centrale, ISBN 978-2-8710-6578-4
