= Adhémar Daenen =

Adhémar Marcel Guillaume Daenen
- Born: 8 September 1853; Brussels, Belgium
- Died: 1 October 1930 (aged 77); Ixelles, Belgium
- Occupations: Soldier, administrator

Adhémar Marcel Guillaume Daenen (8 September 1853 – 1 October 1930) was a Belgian soldier and colonial administrator who was active in the Congo Free State. He provided logistic support to the Congo–Nile expedition under Willem Frans Van Kerckhoven and fought in the Congo–Arab War.

== Early years ==
Adhémar Marcel Guillaume Daenen was born on 8 September 1853 in Brussels. His parents were Marcel Daenen and Elisabeth Castaing. He enlisted in the Belgian army on 11 October 1869. During the Franco-Prussian War of 1870 he was a quartermaster sergeant (sergent-fourrier) in the mobilized Belgian army. On 25 September 1877 he was promoted to second lieutenant.

== Congo Free State ==
=== First term ===
Locations in the Congo

On 15 August 1885 Daenen joined the Congo Free State and embarked in Antwerp on the San Thomé. He arrived in Banana on 26 September 1885, and on 1 October 1885 was appointed deputy of the transport service in Boma. On 22 January 1887, he was appointed district commissioner in Banana. On 20 July 1887 he was made a judicial police officer, and in 20 January 1888 became deputy judge near the court of first instance of Bas-Congo District. On 9 April 1888, he was assigned to the Bangalas and appointed district commissioner. At the end of his term he left the Bangalas on 13 July 1889 and embarked at Banana on the Afrikaan on 1 September 1889 to return to Europe.

=== Congo-Nile expedition ===
Daenen left Antwerp for a second term on 11 May 1890. He arrived in Boma on 18 June 1890, was promoted to captain-commander and was assigned to the Nile expedition of Willem Frans Van Kerckhoven. He was to accompany the vanguard. Daenen reached Ibembo in October 1890 with 50 men. He established a new transit post commanded by Joseph Duvivier in the upstream angle of the confluence of the Elongo River and Itimbiri River. On 8 July 1891 Daenen left for Djabir on the Uele River with the last loads for the Nile expedition, arriving on 8 August 1891. He left Djabir on 18 August 1891 and reached Angu by 31 August 1891 with 30 canoes.

The vanguard of the expedition under Pierre Ponthier had begun the march east on 8 July 1891 through uncharted territory along the Uele. He established relay stations at points on both banks of the river with relatively little opposition from the local people or Arab slavers. He reached Bima and then the mouth of the Bomokandi River, where he established himself solidly. Van Kerckhoven had a more difficult journey. At the start, he had a fight with slavers who were defeated after reinforcements were supplied by Daenen. Then he was attacked by the Ababuas along the river, and again had to call for help by Daenen, who met him with 40 men at the Bima River.

On 3 October 1891 Daenen was sent to locate a detachment sent on reconnaissance towards the Rubi River by Van Kerckhoven. He found it on 6 October 1891 in an Ababua village. The natives had detained it to protect themselves against Arab traders from the South. Daenen established a small post at Woma to defend the region. He then left Bima with a convoy of canoes to go up the Bomokandi River and join Ponthier, who was struggling with the Arabs at Makongo.

=== Congo–Arab War ===
Daenen was given charge of the Rubi–Uele region to replace Jules Alexandre Milz, while remaining responsible for transport. The stations of Djabir, Angu, Bima, Engwettra and Ibembo came under his control. Arab traders resumed their attacks in the Rubi basin towards the end of 1892 during the Congo–Arab War. Helped by Ababua chiefs, Daenen attacked an Arab force in a stockade near the village of Djombi. Daenen inflicted heavy losses, but received a spear wound in his thigh on 27 October 1892. In December 1892, he inflicted a defeat on the Ababua force led by Chicoti.

On 7 May 1893 Daenen left Uele and went to Bumba to go on to the Stanley Falls. Daenen, Joshua Henry and Jacobs placed themselves under the orders of Gaspard Edouard Fivé to take part in the Arab campaign in this region. En route to the Falls on 25 May 1893 they took Isanghi and on 26 May 1893 took the camp of Arab leader Chibou. Daenen successfully stormed a well-defended Arab position at Yatuka on the banks of the Romée River.

== Later career ==
Daenen returned to Lisbon on 5 September 1893, then to Belgium. He remained active in various colonial societies, where he held important positions. He served in the Belgian army during World War I (1914–1918). Adhémar Daenen died in Ixelles, Belgium, on 1 October 1930 aged 77.

== Sources ==
- Coosemans, M. (11 July 1946), "Daenen (Adhémar . Marcel - Guillaume)", Biographie Coloniale Belge (in French), vol. 1, Inst. roy. colon. belge
- Gambier, R. (26 November 1947), "KERCKHOVEN (VAN) (Guillaume François)", Biographie Coloniale Belge (in French), vol. I, Inst. roy. colon. belge, pp. col. 566–573
