= ASO =

ASO or Aso may refer to:

- Aso clan, a historic Japanese clan

== Geography ==
- Aso (river), a river in Italy
- Aso River, in Democratic Republic of the Congo
- Aso, Kumamoto, Japan
- Asō, Ibaraki, a former Japanese town located in Namegata District that is now part of the city of Namegata
- Mount Aso, a mountain in Japan
- Aso Rock, a large outcrop on the outskirts of Abuja, Nigeria

== Ships ==
- Japanese cruiser Aso (1905–1932)
- Aso-class patrol vessel, a class of large patrol vessels of the Japan Coast Guard, named after Mount Aso

== As abbreviation ==
=== Medicine ===
- Allele-specific oligonucleotide
- Antisense oligonucleotide
- Anti-streptolysin O
- Arterial switch operation
- Arteriosclerosis obliterans
- Annals of Surgical Oncology, a peer-reviewed medical journal

=== Orchestras ===
- Adelaide Symphony Orchestra
- Albany Symphony Orchestra
- American Symphony Orchestra
- Amman Symphony Orchestra (since 2015, the JOrchestra)
- Annapolis Symphony Orchestra
- Antwerp Symphony Orchestra
- Appalachian Symphony Orchestra
- Arkansas Symphony Orchestra
- Atlanta Symphony Orchestra
- Austin Symphony Orchestra

=== Technology ===
- Analogue switch/sign-off, part of the digital television transition
- App store optimization

=== Other uses ===
- ASO, general secondary education (Algemeen Secundair Onderwijs in Dutch) in Belgium
- Aso, a story arc in the Philippine comic strip Pugad Baboy
- Aso, standard mineral abbreviation for Arsenolite – Toxic arsenic oxide mineral
- ASO, another name for the arcade game Alpha Mission
- Academy Sports + Outdoors, American retail chain
- Address Supporting Organization, an Internet-protocol advisory group affiliated with ICANN
- Administrative services organization, a company that provides human-resources and other administrative functions to client companies
- Amaury Sport Organisation, organiser of the Tour de France and other sporting events
- ASO or "anvil-shaped object", a cheap anvil made of inferior materials
- Arbitrary slice ordering, an algorithm for loss prevention during image or video compression
- App store optimization, a process of improving the visibility of a mobile app in an App Store
- Areostationary orbit, a circular synchronous orbit around Mars in the equatorial plane
- Aso ebi – Yoruba dressing style
- Aso Kujū National Park – National Park in Kyūshū, Japan
- Aso Villa – Official residence of the Nigerian president
- Australian Screen Online, online database of the Australian National Film and Sound Archive
- ASO Chlef – Algerian football club
- August, September, October, a 3-month season period

== People with the surname ==
- Aso (surname)

== See also ==
- Aso Villa, the office and residence of the Nigerian President
