= Aketi =

Aketi may refer to:

== People ==
- Oluwarotimi Odunayo Akeredolu

== Places ==
- Aketi Airport
- Aketi (town), Democratic Republic of the Congo
- Aketi Territory
- A community in Guria region, Georgia.

== Other ==
- Aketi River
