= Lese =

Lese may refer to:

== People ==
- Grigore Leșe (born 1954), Romanian musician

== Places ==
- Leše, Litija, Slovenia
- Leše, Prevalje, Slovenia
- Leše, Tržič, Slovenia
- Lese River, Democratic Republic of the Congo

== Other ==
- Lese language

== See also ==
- Lèse-majesté
