= Gombari =

- Location within Democratic Republic of the Congo
- Coordinates: 2.716339°N 29.047399°E
- Country: Democratic Republic of the Congo
- Province: Haut-Uélé

Gombari is a populated place in the Democratic Republic of the Congo.

== Location ==
Gombari is in the south of the Haut-Uélé province. It is on the left (south) bank of the Bomokandi River where the river is crossed by the RN26 highway.

== History ==
The Belgian colonists created a post at Gombari. During a period of widespread rebellion in the Uele District in 1886, Ernest Baert decided to abandon all the posts upstream from Djabir and Ibembo apart from Dungu, Akka, Mundu and Gombari. He planned to supply Gombari by a route from the Ituri River to serve as a supply base for operations towards Lake Albert and Bahr-el-Djebel that could be used to reoccupy the Lado Enclave.

== Sources ==
- Coosemans, M. (1948b), "BAERT (Ernest)", Biographie Coloniale Belge (in French), vol. I, Inst. roy. colon. belge, pp. col. 54–57
- "Node: Gombari (1729932919)", OpenStreetMap
