= Amadi, Congo =

Amadi
- Town
- Location within Democratic Republic of the Congo
- Coordinates: 3.633264°N 26.767463°E
- Country: DR Congo
- Province: Bas-Uélé
- Elevation: 626 m (2,054 ft)
- Time zone: UTC+1 (West Africa Time)

Amadi is a town in the Bas-Uélé province of the Democratic Republic of the Congo (DRC).

== Location ==
Amadi lies on the left bank of the Uele River where it was crossed by the RS438 road. It is in the Poko Territory. The Amadi clan are "zandéizéd people who speak the Zande language. They are named after a former leader.

== History ==
A Belgian exploratory column led by Willem Frans Van Kerckhoven and Jules Alexandre Milz reached the location of Amadi on 22 December 1891 where they started to build a post.

Some Premonstratensian missionaries left the Ibembo mission in December 1899 and arrived in Amadi on 10 January 1900, where they founded the first Catholic mission in Haut-Uele. In 1911 the Premonstratensians ceded the eastern part of their apostolic prefecture to the Dominicans. The first Dominicans arrived on 12 January 1912. In 1952 Amadi was ceded to the Augustinians, who formed the apostolic prefecture of Doruma on 24 February 1958. The mission of Amadi Saint-Herman today depends on the Roman Catholic Diocese of Doruma–Dungu.

== Sources ==
- "Amadi", Geonames.org
- Blaes, X. (October 2008). "Découpage administratif de la République Démocratique du Congo" (PDF). PNUD-SIG. Archived from the original (PDF) on 2010-04-01.
- Coosemans, M. (20 May 1946), "MILZ (Jules-Alexandre)", Biographie Belge d'Outre-Mer (in French), vol. I, Académie Royale des Sciences d'Outre-Mer, pp. 697–701
- Omasombo Tshonda, Jean, ed. (2011), Haut Uele : Trésor (PDF), Le Cri édition, Musée royal de l’Afrique centrale, ISBN 978-2-8710-6578-4
