= Zoki =

Zoki may refer to:

- Zoki River in the northern Democratic Republic of the Congo
- A hypocorism of the Slavic given name Zoran
- Zōki, a Japanese Heian-era monk who wrote The Master of the Hut; see Travelers of a Hundred Ages
