= Netpeak =

- Industry: Marketing, IT
- Founder: Artem Borodatiuk; Andriy Chumachenko; Dmytro Piskarev
- Products: Search engine optimisation (SEO), pay-per-click advertising (PPC), mobile app promotion, email marketing, YouTube advertising, web analytics, consultancy
- Parent: Netpeak Group (Inweb, Serpstat, Ringostat, Netpeak Software, Octopus Events, Academy Ocean, Tonti Laguna)
- Website: https://netpeak.ua/

Netpeak (ukr. Нетпік) is a Ukrainian digital marketing agency and one of the largest in Eastern Europe. It was founded in 2006 in Odesa. The company has offices in Ukraine, the USA, Bulgaria and Kazakhstan.

A number of Netpeak’s products have become separate businesses, which are united under the Netpeak Group holding company, comprising: Inweb, Serpstat, Ringostat, Netpeak Software, Octopus Events, Academy Ocean and Tonti Laguna. In 2025, Netpeak Group announced a rebranding and a change of name to FRACTAL.

== History ==
Netpeak was founded on 9 June 2006 in Odessa by Artem Borodatiuk, Andriy Chumachenko and Dmytro Piskarev. Initially, the company focused solely on SEO, but as it expanded into new regions, it added pay-per-click advertising and other digital marketing services to its portfolio.

In 2009, an office was opened in Kyiv; at that time, Netpeak already had 300 clients. In 2014, offices were opened in Bulgaria and Kazakhstan.

In 2014, Netpeak acquired a 10 per cent stake in Q-Page.ru, a start-up specialising in the rapid creation of business card websites, for $100,000, and a 20 per cent stake in the start-up HTraffic. The following year, Serpstat, a competitor analysis service developed by Netpeak, raised $250,000 from the investment firm Digital Future to expand the service’s functionality and enter new markets.

In 2025, the products were officially brought together under a single holding company called Netpeak Group.

In 2020, Netpeak acquired a controlling stake in the Ukrainian company RadASO, which specialises in ASO.

In the summer of 2020, the company’s CEO, Artem Borodatyuk, announced the closure of some of the company’s offices and a switch to remote working until the end of 2020.

In autumn 2018, Netpeak launched the Netpeak Cluster educational project, aimed at helping small businesses establish an online presence. In 2020, the Netpeak Cluster project evolved into SaaS.

In August 2020, Netpeak, in collaboration with the Ministry of Digital Transformation, launched a free educational course on online marketing for entrepreneurs.

Since 2012, Netpeak has been organising an internet marketing conference in Odessa — 8P.

== Achievements ==
- A Premier Google Partner in Ukraine across all specialisation categories for contextual advertising.
- Ranked 3031st in the Inc. 5000 international ranking in 2018, with a growth rate of 172 per cent
- It was ranked as Ukraine’s first and best digital agency in the ‘performance’ category by IAB Ukraine and the BRC in 2020.
- Official website
- Netpeak on Facebook
