= Aso (surname) =

Asō (Japanese: 麻生), also spelled Asou or Asoh, is a Japanese surname. People with this surname include:

- Haro Aso (麻生羽呂), Japanese manga artist
- Hiromi Asō (麻生 ひろみ, born 1972), an alternate stage name of Marina Ōno, a Japanese voice actress and singer
- Izumi Aso (麻生 いずみ, born 1960), Japanese manga artist
- Kaori Asoh (麻生 かほ里, born 1967), Japanese theatre and voice actress
- Aso Koremitsu (阿蘇 惟光, 1582–1593), Japanese nobleman of the Azuchi-Momoyama era
- Kumiko Asō (麻生 久美子, born 1978), Japanese actress
- Mamiko Asō (麻生 真宮子, born 1964), Japanese singer and businesswoman
- Miyoko Asō (麻生 美代子, 1926–2018), Japanese voice actress
- Natsuko Aso (麻生 夏子, born 1990), Japanese actress and singer
- Takeharu Asō – Japanese cross-country skier (1899–1993)
- Tarō Asō (麻生 太郎, born 1940), politician and 59th Prime Minister of Japan
- Vince Aso – New Zealand rugby union player
- Wataru Asō (麻生 渡, 1939–2025), Japanese governor of Fukuoka prefecture from 1995 to 2011
- Yumi Asō (奥村 由美, born 1963), Japanese actress

== See also ==
- ASO
