= Bondo Territory =

- Territory
- Interactive map of Bondo Territory
- Coordinates: 3.8°N 23.7°E
- Country: Democratic Republic of Congo
- Province: Bas-Uele

Area
  - Total: 38,075 km^{2} (14,701 sq mi)

Population (2016)
  - Total: 435,549
  - Density: 11.439/km^{2} (29.627/sq mi)
- Time zone: UTC+2 (CAT)

Bondo Territory is a territory in the Bas-Uele Province of the Democratic Republic of the Congo. The administrative capital is the town of Bondo.

== Location ==
The territory borders Central African Republic to the north and west, Ango Territory to the east, Buta Territory to the southeast, Aketi Territory to the south and Yakoma Territory in Nord-Ubangi District to the southwest. Rivers include the Duma River, the Bomu River, which flows along the Central African Republican border, Ngwane River, Aso River, Dume River and the Uere River.

== Subdivisions ==
The territory contains the following chiefdoms:

- Biamange Chiefdom
- Boso Chiefdom
- Deni Chiefdom
- Duaru Chiefdom
- Gama Chiefdom
- Gaya Chiefdom
- Goa Chiefdom
- Kasa Chiefdom
- Mobenge-Mondila Chiefdom
- Soa Chiefdom
