= Duma River =

Watercourse in Kasai-Oriental, DRC

Duma River is a river of the Democratic Republic of the Congo. It flows through Bondo Territory in Bas-Uele District.
