= Gada River (Uele) =

- Location within Democratic Republic of the Congo

Location
- Country: Democratic Republic of the Congo
- Province: Haut-Uélé

Physical characteristics
- Mouth: Uele River
  - coordinates: 3.675612°N 27.827085°E

The Gada River (French: Rivière Gada) is a left tributary of the Uele River, which it joins downstream from Niangara in the Haut-Uélé province of the Democratic Republic of the Congo.

== Course ==
The Gada River forms to the southwest of Ndedu and flows in a generally northwest direction with many meanders to join the Uele downstream from Niangara. Niangara is built on a clay plateau between the Uele and the Gada. There is one large set of rapids, the Chute Itelengi.

The river contains some gold, which the indigenous population extracts through artisanal methods. The river also provides a source of fish for the riverine population. In the colonial era the Belgians developed some fish ponds, but these have been abandoned.

== History ==
A Belgian expedition led by Jules Alexandre Milz traveled by land along the south bank of the Uele selecting sites for new posts, and reached the confluence of the Gada River with the Uele on 18 March 1892, where they chose to build a new station at the village of Mbegu, named Niangara. Willem Frans Van Kerckhoven arrived there on 25 March 1892, and Jean-Hubert Cloesen was placed in charge of the post.

== Sources ==
- Charrier, François (2010), Évaluation de la sécurité alimentaire de la population du Territoire de Niangara, District du Haut-Uélé, & de la région de Dingila, (Territoires de Ango et Bambesa), District du Bas-Uélé (PDF), Action Contre la Faim
- Coosemans, M. (20 May 1946), "MILZ (Jules-Alexandre)", Biographie Belge d'Outre-Mer (in French), vol. I, Académie Royale des Sciences d'Outre-Mer, pp. 697–701
- Mathieu, F.F. (1921–1922), "Note sur les calcaires de l 'Intimbiri, de l'Uélé et del' Aruwimi", Annales de la Société Géologique de Belgique, Publications relatives au Congo Belge et aux régions voisines (in French), vol. 45, pp. C25–C33
- "Relation: Gada (2683771)", OpenStreetMap
- "Territoire de Niangara : Le centre géographique de l'Afrique (Province Haut-Uele)", Congo Autrement, 24 October 2017
