= Aketi Territory =

Aketi
- Territory
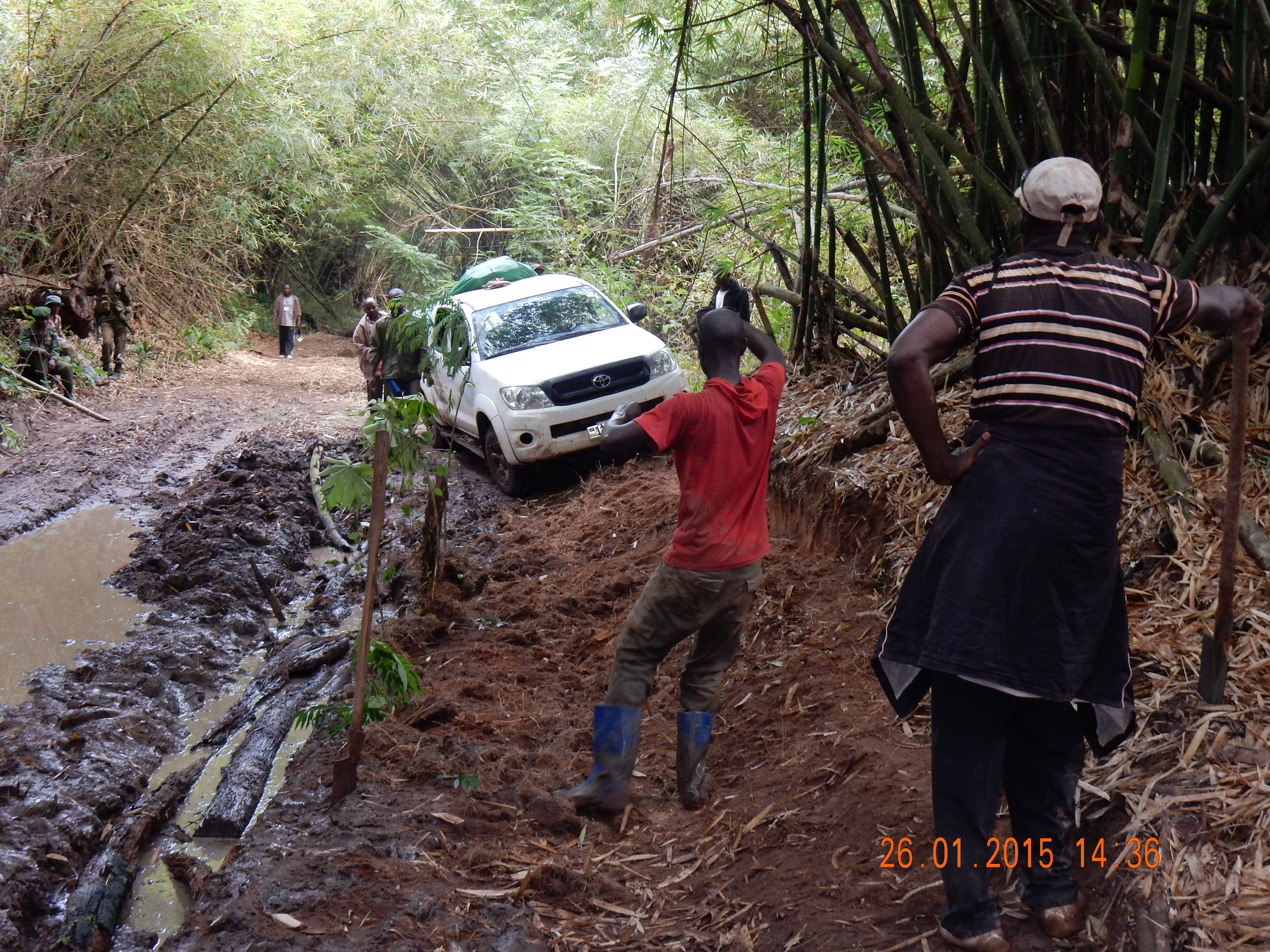
- Interactive map of Aketi
- Location within Democratic Republic of the Congo
- Coordinates: 2.7°N 23.8°E
- Country: Democratic Republic of Congo
- Province: Bas-Uele

Area
  - Total: 25,415 km^{2} (9,813 sq mi)

Population (2016)
  - Total: 150,502
  - Density: 5.9218/km^{2} (15.337/sq mi)
- Time zone: UTC+2 (CAT)
- National language: Lingala

Aketi Territory is a territory in the Bas-Uele Province of the Democratic Republic of the Congo. The administrative capital is located at Aketi. The territory borders Bondo Territory to the north, Buta Territory to the east, Basoko Territory to the south, Bumba Territory to the west in Mongala Province and Yakoma Territory in Nord-Ubangi Province to the northwest. Rivers include the Likati River, Zoki River, Maze River, Tinda River, Tshimbi River, Elongo River, Aketi River, Yoko River and Lese River along the southern territorial border.

== Subdivisions ==
The territory contains the following chiefdoms/sectors:

- Avuru-Duma
- Avuru-Gatanga
- Bondongola
- Mabinza
- Mobati-Boyele
- Mongwandi
- Gbandi
- Yoko
