= Bomane =

- Location within Democratic Republic of the Congo
- Coordinates: 1.3028°N 23.81738°E
- Country: Democratic Republic of the Congo
- Province: Tshopo
- Elevation: 375 m (1,230 ft)

Bomane is a village on the Aruwimi River in the Tshopo province of the Democratic Republic of the Congo.

Bomane was among the posts founded in 1889–1890 by a Belgian expedition led by Léon Roget. Jules Alexandre Milz was placed in charge.

== Sources ==
- "Bomane", Geonames.org
- Coosemans, M. (20 May 1946), "MILZ (Jules-Alexandre)", Biographie Belge d'Outre-Mer (in French), vol. I, Académie Royale des Sciences d'Outre-Mer, pp. 697–701
