= Ngwane River =

Ngwane River is a river of northern Democratic Republic of the Congo. It flows through Bondo Territory in Bas-Uele District.
