= Tshimbi River =

Tshimbi River is a river located in the northern Democratic Republic of the Congo. It flows through Aketi Territory in Bas-Uele District.
