= Maze River (Democratic Republic of the Congo) =

River in Congo

Maze River is a river of northern Democratic Republic of the Congo. It flows through Aketi Territory in Bas-Uele District.
