= Bokoyo =

- Location within Democratic Republic of the Congo
- Coordinates: 4.3396°N 28.7605°E
- Country: Democratic Republic of the Congo
- Province: Haut-Uélé
- Territory: Dungu Territory
- Time zone: UTC+2 (Central Africa Time)

Bokoyo is a settlement in Dungu Territory, Haut-Uélé, Democratic Republic of the Congo.

== Location ==
Bokoyo is in Dungu Territory, Haut-Uélé, Democratic Republic of the Congo. It is about 80 kilometres (50 mi) NNE of Dungu and just west of the Réserve de chasse d'Azande. The Köppen climate classification is Aw: Tropical savanna, wet.

== History ==
On 14 August 1893 a Belgian expedition under Ernest Baert with 86 African soldiers reached Bokoyo from Dungu. At Bokoyo they were joined by 350 Azande auxiliaries. They continued on to Mundu en route to the Nile.

== Sources ==
- "Bokoyo, Haut Uele, Democratic Republic of the Congo", Mindat.org
- Coosemans, M. (1948b), "BAERT (Ernest)", Biographie Coloniale Belge (in French), vol. I, Inst. roy. colon. belge, pp. col. 54–57
- "mlat=4.3396&mlon=28.7605", OpenStreetMap
