= Artem Borodatiuk =

Ukrainian army volunteer and entrepreneur

Borodatiuk Artem Ihorovych
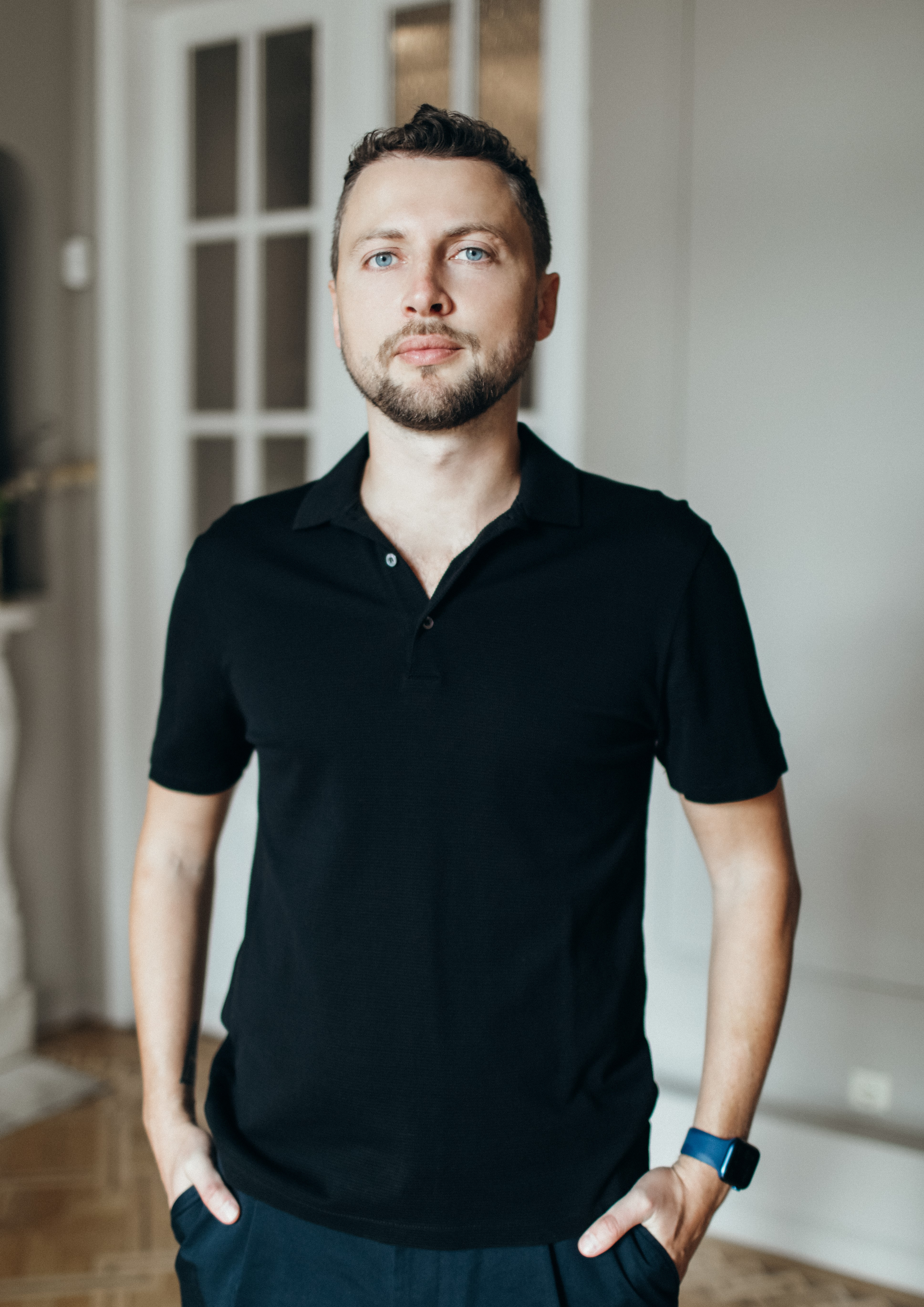
- Born: May 20, 1985 (age 41); Odesa, Ukrainian SSR, USSR
- Education: Odesa National Polytechnic University
- Occupation: businessman

Artem Ihorovych Borodatiuk (born May 20, 1985, in Odesa, Ukraine) is a Ukrainian entrepreneur, volunteer, and civic figure.

He is the founder of FRACTAL (known as Netpeak Group until August 2025), an IT and business ecosystem uniting 30 companies, two non-profit organizations, and approximately 1,700 professionals. He is also a co-founder of Serpstat, Ringostat, and various SaaS and EdTech projects, a recipient of the Order of Merit, 3rd Class (awarded in November 2024), a member of the Council on Support of Entrepreneurship under the President of Ukraine (since 2024), and a member of the Strategic Council of the Diia.City United association.

== Biography ==
He was born on May 20, 1985, in Odesa. In 2007, he graduated from the Institute of Computer Systems of Odesa National Polytechnic University.

=== Business Career ===
In June 2006, Borodatiuk founded the digital marketing agency Netpeak in Odesa, specializing in search engine optimization (SEO), pay-per-click advertising (PPC), and web promotion. In 2011, the digital agency Inweb was launched, and in 2012, he co-founded the business incubator WannaBiz.

In 2013, internal technological tools developed at Netpeak — the search marketing platform Serpstat and the call-tracking and analytics service Ringostat — were spun off as independent commercial businesses.

In 2015, the umbrella brand Netpeak Group was formed. On August 19, 2025, the holding rebranded under the name FRACTAL. Borodatiuk noted that a primary driver for the rebranding was persistent market confusion between Netpeak as a single marketing agency and Netpeak Group as a diversified group of companies. The name FRACTAL references the mathematical concept of self-similarity: individual businesses operate autonomously while replicating shared group-wide frameworks for management, corporate culture, and organizational values.

The ecosystem's growth model combined internal startup incubation with strategic partnerships and mergers and acquisitions (M&A). Over the years, companies such as AcademyOcean (2017), Tonti Laguna Group, Saldo Apps, RadASO (2020), Choice31 (2021), Core, CoreHR, and others joined or were founded across SaaS, digital marketing, mobile software, recruitment, education, and corporate services.

As of 2026, according to official company data, FRACTAL comprises 30 commercial businesses, two public non-profit organizations, and approximately 1,700 employees. The ecosystem spans B2B SaaS products, digital and marketing agencies, recruitment and financial consulting services, educational ventures, and product/venture studios.

=== Ecosystem Expansion in 2025–2026 ===
In 2025, FRACTAL continued expanding through both internal project incubation and M&A deals. Within the Netpeak agency, the marketing agency BASE and the international export promotion initiative Prosto Export were launched. The group also acquired the financial consulting firm fint8, while Tonti Laguna Group purchased an equity stake in the video production studio LOCATION, making LOCATION the 30th business within FRACTAL.

In October 2025, FRACTAL announced a $1 million investment in Finerd, a fintech tool designed for personal, family, and corporate financial management. Finerd originated as a spin-off from Saldo Finance before being established as an independent venture within the ecosystem.

In January 2026, educational company Choice31 acquired IAMPM, an online academy specializing in non-technical IT roles. IAMPM's course catalog and personnel were integrated into Choice31, with the unified business presented as Choice31 & IAMPM.

During the same month, the recruitment agency Netpeak Talent underwent a rebranding and was renamed talanovyti. The rebranding reflected the entity's evolution from an internal talent acquisition arm into an independent agency providing recruitment services to external corporate clients.

Throughout 2026, other internal divisions updated their brand identities: Netpeak New was renamed FRACTAL New, and Netpeak Event Agency (established in 2025) was relaunched as ROKOSH Event Agency, specializing in corporate, public, and promotional events, including the launch of Borodatiuk's management book.

In March 2026, coinciding with its 20th anniversary, the core Netpeak agency introduced a comprehensive rebranding, overhauling its visual identity and expanding its market positioning from a performance-focused digital agency into a full-cycle strategic marketing partner.

Through these initiatives in 2025–2026, the group progressively phased out the "Netpeak" name for standalone businesses that operated independently from the original marketing agency.

=== Educational Initiatives and For Managers Book ===
Borodatiuk began developing the "For Managers" educational system as an internal executive training curriculum for department heads within his companies. The first lesson was introduced in January 2022; the program was expanded to FRACTAL's executive leadership and external entrepreneurs in 2023, and on March 6, 2025, an open, abridged version was made accessible to the public. The curriculum includes 8 modules and 38 text and video lessons covering situational leadership, goal-setting, delegation, Product-Market Fit, and business metrics.

According to FRACTAL's submission for the "Business That Changes the Country" CSR competition, over 10,925 users had enrolled in the course by October 2025, and its methodology had been integrated into the employee training programs of dozens of companies. The complete management methodology formed the basis of Borodatiuk's three-volume print work, For Managers, which he developed over 3.5 years, compiling approximately 40 actionable algorithms and frameworks for managerial decision-making and operational problem-solving. Pre-orders opened on December 18, 2025, and public sales launched on February 2, 2026 (establishing 2026 as the formal publication year for the print edition).

On January 29, 2026, Borodatiuk held the official book presentation at the Parkovy Exhibition and Convention Center in Kyiv. According to Forbes Ukraine, the event drew approximately 1,000 in-person attendees and over 1,500 livestream viewers. The presentation was produced by FRACTAL's event arm, Rokosh Event Agency; according to its CEO Dmytro Buhlak, the overall expenditure on the presentation totaled nearly UAH 3.6 million. The first print run of the three-volume edition sold out in under six months.

In 2025–2026, elements of Borodatiuk's management curriculum were adapted for Ukraine's secondary education system. The Ministry of Education and Science of Ukraine approved elective model educational programs authored by Borodatiuk for 10th–12th grades: "Next-Generation Leader: Foundations of Management" and "Startup Generation: From Idea to Success," along with "Artificial Intelligence and Society" (co-authored with Serhii Sauta).

In 2026, the holding launched FRACTAL Talks, an interview series hosted by Borodatiuk featuring in-depth conversations with CEOs across the ecosystem on corporate finance, recruitment, performance marketing, brand architecture, and client service.

=== Management Philosophy and the "III > I" Mission ===
Across his books, training programs, and public columns, Borodatiuk advocates a management doctrine centered on systematic structure, measurable metrics, personal accountability, and continuous employee development. In a 2025 column for NV, he synthesized these views into 19 principles drawn from 19 years of entrepreneurial practice.

A foundational thesis of Borodatiuk's philosophy is transforming companies from informal, ad-hoc groupings dependent on key individuals into repeatable, resilient systems. This concept is reflected in the name FRACTAL, under which independent businesses replicate common management guidelines, organizational standards, and corporate values ("self-similarity"). Key elements include prioritizing personnel over abstract strategy ("who" before "what" and "how"), adopting Hersey–Blanchard situational leadership, maintaining high performance standards without micromanagement ("power in balance"), and applying First Principles Thinking.

Borodatiuk treats goal-setting and performance reporting as an integrated management loop. His proprietary frameworks include SMARTCBP (an expanded goal-setting model) and ROAIP (ROI-Oriented Approach to the Improvement Process), which evaluates operational changes and automation through quantifiable economic returns (such as cost reductions or added revenue). Another proprietary framework, SH (Shit Happens), structures operational problems and organizational friction into defined, solvable tasks. Other methodologies include ARCV for note-taking, ETI for execution under resource constraints, BLR for marketing architecture, LAC for client service delivery, and the CBI communication model.

Borodatiuk defined FRACTAL's overarching mission as "transitioning from the Third World to the First World economically and mentally within one generation, without changing geographical location" (abbreviated as "III > I"). Originating during the Netpeak Group era, this mission is pursued across three levels: enhancing client business profitability, shaping corporate culture and critical thinking through social and educational initiatives, and driving systemic macroeconomic transformation in Ukraine.

=== Public and State Activities ===
In 2017, Borodatiuk co-founded the social restaurant "4City" in Odesa, directing the majority of its profits toward urban community development projects.

Following the beginning of Russia's full-scale invasion of Ukraine in 2022, he initiated assistance programs for volunteer funds, partnered with the Ministry of Digital Transformation to launch the "Be Brave Like Ukraine" course, and contributed financial donations to the Armed Forces of Ukraine and humanitarian projects.

In November 2024, President Volodymyr Zelenskyy awarded Borodatiuk the Order of Merit, 3rd Class, recognizing his significant contribution to the development of Ukrainian entrepreneurship, national defense support, and charitable initiatives during wartime.

In January 2024, Borodatiuk was appointed to the Council on Support of Entrepreneurship under Martial Law under the President of Ukraine (Presidential Decree No. 30/2024). In 2026, he was reappointed to the council's updated composition (Presidential Decree No. 268/2026). In July 2024, Borodatiuk and fellow council members participated in negotiations with government officials regarding taxation policy, advocating for deregulation and curbing the shadow economy as alternatives to raising statutory tax rates on formal businesses.

Borodatiuk is a co-founder and member of the Strategic Council of the Diia.City United public union. At the Ukraine Recovery Conference 2026, he highlighted the Diia.City special legal regime as a cornerstone of the Ukrainian tech industry and called for preserving its key provisions and regulatory stability during Ukraine's European Union accession process.

=== Recognition and Awards ===
- Order of Merit, 3rd Class (awarded by President Volodymyr Zelenskyy, November 2024).
- Medal of the Ministry of Defence of Ukraine "For Assistance to the Armed Forces of Ukraine" (2022).
- Honorary badge of the Commander-in-Chief of the Armed Forces of Ukraine "For Assistance to the Army" (2023).
- Commemorative badge of the State Service of Special Communications and Information Protection of Ukraine.
- In DOU's 2025 Best IT Employers ranking, FRACTAL ranked 4th in its respective company category.
- In the Forbes Ukraine "Employer of the Year 2026" ranking, FRACTAL placed 3rd overall with a score of 85 points (moving up 19 positions) and received the special "Breakthrough of the Year" distinction.
