= Aketi River =

Coordinates: 2.7275°N 23.7858°E

- Location of mouth

Location
- Country: Democratic Republic of the Congo
- District: Bas-Uele District

Aketi River is a river of the northern Democratic Republic of the Congo. It flows through Aketi Territory in Bas-Uele District.
