= Zoki River =

- Location of mouth

Location
- Country: Democratic Republic of the Congo
- Territory: Aketi Territory

Physical characteristics
- Mouth
  - coordinates: 3.380303017352695°N 23.898929770026424°E

Zoki River is a river of northern Democratic Republic of the Congo. It flows through Aketi Territory in Bas-Uele District.
