= Elongo River =

River in the Democratic Republic of the Congo

Elongo River is a river of northern Democratic Republic of the Congo. It flows through Aketi Territory in Bas-Uele District.
