= Ekwangatana =

- Location within Democratic Republic of the Congo
- Coordinates: 2.8865°N 24.0889°E
- Country: Democratic Republic of the Congo
- Province: Bas-Uélé
- Elevation: 417 m (1,368 ft)

Ekwangatana is the location of a post established by Belgian officers in what is now Bas-Uélé province in the Democratic Republic of the Congo.

== Location ==
Ekwangatana is near the present settlement of Djamba where the Rubi River and Likati River converge to form the Itimbiri River. It is at an elevation of 417 metres (1,368 ft).

== History ==
Ekwangatana was founded as a government post in May 1890 by Léon Roget and Jules Milz, who entrusted it to an African officer. The Belgian limited company Société Commerciale et Minière de l´Uelé (COMUELE) was created in June 1919 as a joint venture between the Société commerciale et Minière du Congo (Cominière) and the English Lever Brothers. In 1926 it established the Ekwangatana coffee plantations.

A station was set up in Ekwangatana for a magnetic survey of the Belgian Congo in 1936–1937. It was on the left bank of the Itimbiri (Rubi), in front of the workers' camp of the Comuele Ekwangatana plantation, in a small clearing in the forest about 250 meters south-southwest of the coffee pulping plant. This survey gave an altitude of 375 metres (1,230 ft).

== Sources ==
- "Ekwangatana", MapCarta
- Ergo, André-Bernard, La COMUELE (PDF), archived from the original (PDF) on 2020-10-30
- Hermans, L. (1951), Carte Magnétique Du Congo Belge (PDF) (in French), Institut Royal Colonial Belge
- Omasombo Tshonda, Jean, ed. (2011), Huat Uele : Trésor (PDF), Le Cri édition, Musée royal de l’Afrique centrale, ISBN 978-2-8710-6578-4
