= Nzoro River =

River in Democratic Republic of the Congo

- Location within Democratic Republic of the Congo

Location
- Country: Democratic Republic of the Congo
- Province: Haut-Uélé

Physical characteristics
- Mouth: Kibali River
  - coordinates: 3.29348°N 29.42869°E

Basin features
- River system: Uele River, Congo Basin

The Nzoro River (or Nzaro, Obi, Zoro) is a river in the Democratic Republic of the Congo. It is a right tributary of the Kibali River. It is used to supply hydroelectric power to the Kibali Gold Mine.

== Course ==
The Nzoro River originates in the extreme northeast of the country, near where the border with South Sudan joins the border with Uganda. It follows a meandering course in a generally west direction to its junction with the Kibali downstream from Durba. The Köppen climate classification is Aw: Tropical savanna, wet.

== Human impact ==
The Logo people and Lugbara people live in the river basin.

In 1891 Guillaume Van Kerkhoven, Pierre Ponthier and Jules Milz travelled from Bumba up the Itimbiri and Likati, rivers, then overland to the Uele River in the region of Djabir. They then explored the Kibali and the Zoro. They reached the Nile, but had to retreat to the Dungu region when they were attacked by Mahdists.

The Kibali Gold Mine, operated by Randgold, started operations in 2009. The company installed a 20 MW hydroelectric power plant on the Nzoro River, and planned to install three more. The power plants are on cataracts and provide run-of-the-river hydroelectricity, avoiding the need for dams.

== Sources ==
- Alsdorf, Douglas; Beighley, Ed; Laraque, Alain; Lee, Hyongki; Tshimanga, Raphael; et al. (14 April 2016), "Opportunities for hydrologic research in the Congo Basin" (PDF), Reviews of Geophysics, vol. 54, no. 2, doi:10.1002/2016RG000517
- Ergo, André-Bernard (2013), "Les postes fortifiés de la frontière Nord de l'État Indépendant du Congo", Histoire du Congo (PDF)
- "Nzoro, Haut Uele, Democratic Republic of the Congo", Mindat.org
- "Relation: Nzoro (2683773)", OpenStreetMap
- Tucker, A. N. (22 September 2017), The Eastern Sudanic Languages, Taylor & Francis, ISBN 978-1-351-61006-3
