= Aso River =

River in the Democratic Republic of Congo

Aso River is a river of northern Democratic Republic of Congo. It flows through Bondo Territory in Bas-Uele District.
