= Mamiko Asō =

Japanese musician

Mamiko Aso
- Born: 麻生真美子 (Asō Mamiko); February 5, 1964 (age 62); Fukuoka, Japan
- Origin: Turin, Italy
- Genres: Eurodance, J-pop, synthpop, hardstyle, Eurodance, Italo dance
- Occupations: Musician, Actress
- Instrument: Vocals
- Years active: 1980s–present
- Labels: Victor Entertainment, Great Dance Records, Vibrative Records, Euronoize, Dance Or Die Records
- Formerly of: (麻生真美子＆キャプテン, Asō Mamiko & Captain)
- Past members: (Kiyoko Kitazawa, Keiko Yamamoto. 1984–1987)

Mamiko Aso (麻生 真宮子, Asō Mamiko; born February 5, 1964), whose real name is Miwa Tajima (田島 みわ, Tajima Miwa), is a former Japanese idol, singer and actress of the 1980s, who is currently a businesswoman.

== Idol career ==
Aso started her career in 1984, forming the group Asō Mamiko & Captain (or Aso Mamiko & Captain), with the duo of dancers and singers Captain.

After their separation in 1987, she continued her solo career as Mamiko Asō, releasing two singles in Japan, and a few plays in drama and film.

In the 1990s, she released three singles in Italy, including Drive me crazy to Love in 1995, which peaked #21 in the local charts. In 1998, she created a company name, TAJIMA, she directs and produces its own among other Italian wine. Now using the artist Mamiko name, she released a new single in 2000, Walking in the Sunshine, and then, Your Lies that she released in 2004, and a book on Italy in 2006, Turin.

== Post-idol career. ==
Retiring from her idol career, she resumed her real name, Miwa Tajima, and entered politics, standing for election for the House of Councillors in July 2010. However, she failed to win election.

== Discography ==
=== Singles ===
Year	Single	Peak chart positions	
Year	Single	ITA	JPN
1987	"Sasayaki wa Destiny (ささやきはデスティニー)"	—	22*
1988	"Dakara Nakanaide Otoko (男だから泣かないで)"	—	17*
1995	"Drive Me Crazy To Love"	21	21
1997	"My Girl" (Paul Diamond Vs. Mamiko)	—	—
2000	"Walking in the Sunshine"	—	—
2004	"Your Lies"	—	—

- *"Sasayaki wa Destiny" and, "Dakara Nakanaide Otoko" did not originally appear on the Japanese Oricon charts in Japan, but were released as singles only in Japan in 1987.
