= Dume River =

- Location within Democratic Republic of the Congo

Location
- Country: Democratic Republic of the Congo
- Province: Bas-Uélé
- Territory: Bondo Territory

Physical characteristics
- Mouth: Mbomou River
  - coordinates: 4°54′41″N 24°41′17″E

The Dume River is a river of northern Democratic Republic of the Congo. It flows through Bondo Territory in Bas-Uele District. It is a left tributary of the Mbomou River-
