= Bilious fever =

18th-19th-century medical diagnosis

- Differential diagnosis: malaria, viral hepatitis

Bilious fever was a medical diagnosis of fever associated with excessive bile or bilirubin in the blood stream and tissues, causing jaundice (a yellow color in the skin or sclera of the eye). The most common cause was malaria. Viral hepatitis and bacterial infections of the blood stream (sepsis) may have caused a few of the deaths reported as bilious fever.

The term is obsolete and no longer used, but was used by medical practitioners in the 18th and 19th centuries for any fever that exhibited the symptom of nausea or vomiting in addition to an increase in internal body temperature and strong diarrhea, which were thought to arise from disorders of bile, the two types of which were two of the four humours of traditional Galenic medicine. It was often cited as a cause on death certificates.
