= Tinda River =

Tinda River is a river of northern Democratic Republic of the Congo. It flows through Aketi Territory in Bas-Uele District.
