= Umangi =

- Location within Democratic Republic of the Congo
- Coordinates: 2.11623°N 21.39509°E
- Country: Democratic Republic of the Congo
- Province: Mongala
- Elevation: 347 m (1,138 ft)

Umangi is a village on the right bank of the Congo River downstream from Lisala in the Mongala province of the Democratic Republic of the Congo.

== History ==
Umangi was among the posts founded in 1888–1889 by a Belgian expedition led by Francis Dhanis.

== Sources ==
- "Umangi", Geonames.org
- Coosemans, M. (20 May 1946), "MILZ (Jules-Alexandre)", Biographie Belge d'Outre-Mer (in French), vol. I, Académie Royale des Sciences d'Outre-Mer, pp. 697–701
