= Upoto =

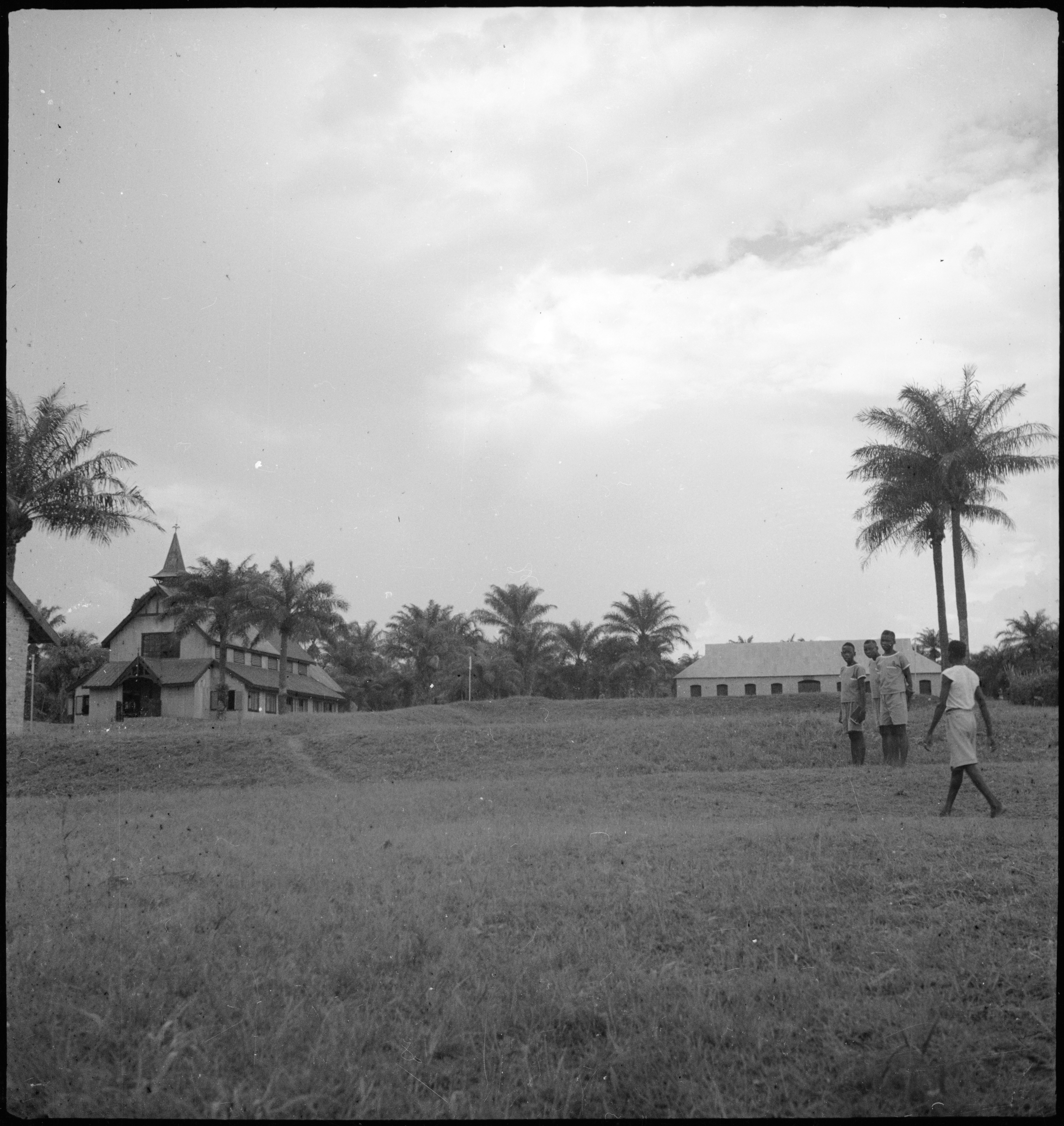
- Upoto Mission Building

- Location within Democratic Republic of the Congo
- Coordinates: 2.14082°N 21.49432°E
- Country: Democratic Republic of the Congo
- Province: Mongala
- Elevation: 399 m (1,309 ft)

Upoto was a village on the right bank of the Congo River, now a district of Lisala in the Mongala province of the Democratic Republic of the Congo.

== History ==
Captain Hanssens of the International Association of the Congo founded the Upoto station, on the right bank of the Congo above the confluence of the Mongala River, in June 1884. A military post was founded there in 1888–1889 by a Belgian expedition led by Francis Dhanis.

== Sources ==
- Bartholomew, John George (1885), "International Congo Association : Lists of its 45 Stations", Scottish Geographical Magazine, 1 (1–3), The Scottish Geographical Society: 47–49, doi:10.1080/14702548508553946
- Coosemans, M. (20 May 1946), "MILZ (Jules-Alexandre)", Biographie Belge d'Outre-Mer (in French), vol. I, Académie Royale des Sciences d'Outre-Mer, pp. 697–701
- "Upoto", Geonames.org
