= App store optimization =

Optimization for app store visibility

App store optimization (ASO) is the process of increasing an app or game’s visibility in an app store, with the objective of increasing organic app downloads. Apps are more visible when they rank highly on a wide variety of search terms (keyword optimization), maintain a high position in the top charts, or get featured on the store. Additionally, app store optimization encompasses activities that aim to increase the conversion of app impressions into downloads (conversion rate optimization).

The two largest distribution channels for mobile apps are the App Store (iOS) and Google Play (Android). Other alternatives for downloading apps include the Huawei App Gallery, Amazon App Store and Samsung Galaxy Store.

== History ==
On July 10, 2008, Apple's App Store was launched along with the release of the iPhone 3G. It offered users the possibility to download over 500 native applications for free. Since then, the popularity of the App Store has risen immensely, counting around 1.82 million apps available in the store in 2020. A variety of Apple devices currently offer store use, including the iPhone, iPad, Mac, Apple TV, and Apple Watch.

The Google Play Store, originally called Android Market, was released on October 22, 2008, alongside the T-Mobile G1. Over 50 apps were initially available, with this number rising to around 2.8 million in 2020. Google Play is currently supported on Android smartphones & tablets, ChromeOS, Android TV, Wear OS, and the web.

ASO has begun to develop into an established procedure. The term gained recognition in the industry, with sites such as Search Engine Watch and TechCrunch advocating the practice by February 2012. As store guidelines have become increasingly strict in recent years, ASO has steadily become more relevant.

== Methods ==
=== Goals ===
Depending on a company’s priorities, goals and key performance indicators (KPI), ASO can consist of:

- Executing keyword research to optimize metadata with the most searched keywords.
- Optimizing creative assets, such as icons, screenshots and videos, to encourage more users to download your app.
- Localizing the app’s product page into foreign languages worldwide.
- Implementing a review strategy to ensure a steady stream of positive reviews.
- Increasing the app’s visibility in editorial content, featured stories or ‘Similar Apps’ placements.
- Monitoring app store changes and competitor updates to maintain visibility.

=== Keyword optimization ===
Keyword optimization is one of the most substantial ASO tasks. It involves the selection of highly optimal and relevant keywords which will subsequently be included in an app’s metadata (title, subtitle, description, keyword field).

According to Apple, 65% of app downloads occur directly after a search on the App Store.

=== Conversion rate optimization ===
Conversion rate optimization aims to increase an app’s downloads. As both the App Store and the Google Play store require developers to comply with specific guidelines (size, content) for each asset, it is essential to stay up to date with the stores’ specifications.

It is recommended to measure the impact of creative optimizations through A/B testing. This process involves creating different variations of a visual asset (e.g. two screenshot alternatives), randomly showing each variation to separate groups of users, and then comparing the conversion rates. Google Play facilitates this process, providing ASO marketers with a built-in A/B testing platform on the Google Play Console.

For other platforms such as the Apple App Store, ASO marketers can run A/B tests via third-party A/B testing tools; run a pre/post test (directly releasing new assets in the store and measuring the impact pre- and post-change); a country-by-country experiment (testing different asset variations across similar countries), or testing different variations via ad platforms such as Facebook Ads.

An app’s visibility can also be increased by being featured on the app store. Being ‘featured’ refers to being promoted by store editors as a particularly relevant, high-quality, and engaging app. While it is notoriously difficult to be featured on the app stores, studies show that it drives visibility, traffic and downloads significantly.

=== ASO tools ===
Many companies choose to utilize specific ASO tools on the market. Such tools contain a number of features which can facilitate an app marketer’s ASO strategy. The main features of ASO tools include:

- Keyword research: Keyword suggestions, volume, installs, chance & difficulty (of ranking)
- Keyword tracking & monitoring: ranking history, keyword update impact
- Competitive analysis: Download & revenue estimates, metadata updates, rankings
- Featured Apps
- Ratings and reviews: Sentiment analysis

== White hat versus black hat ==
‘White hat’ ASO refers to ASO strategies that are generally accepted, approved of and recommended by app stores, app marketers and developers. These practices maintain the integrity of an app, staying within the realms of the app stores’ terms of services. However, app marketers may alternatively engage in ‘black hat’ ASO strategies. ‘Black hat’ ASO practices are those that are forbidden by the stores, breaching rules and/or guidelines with the aim of driving further exposure under the guise of a more ‘popular’ app.

While some marketers attempt to manipulate app stores with black hat strategies, the success of such techniques has become increasingly difficult through the years. In February 2012, Apple released a statement, reported by The New York Times, "warning app makers that using third-party services to gain top placement in App Store charts could get them banned from the store.”

Google followed Apple in 2015 and started manually reviewing apps, enforcing app quality and reducing black hat practices.
