= Yambuya =

- Location within Democratic Republic of the Congo
- Coordinates: 1.263669°N 24.552813°E
- Country: DR Congo
- Province: Tshopo
- Territory: Banalia
- Time zone: UTC+2 (Central Africa Time)

Yambuya is a community in the Democratic Republic of the Congo, on the Aruwimi River, roughly due north of Yangambi. The river is navigable as far as Yambuya, but is blocked by cataracts further upstream.

Yambuya was made a base for the Emin Pasha Relief Expedition of 1886 to 1889, when an expedition led by Henry Morton Stanley went cross-country to the relief of Emin Pasha, General Charles Gordon's besieged governor of Equatoria, threatened by Mahdist forces.

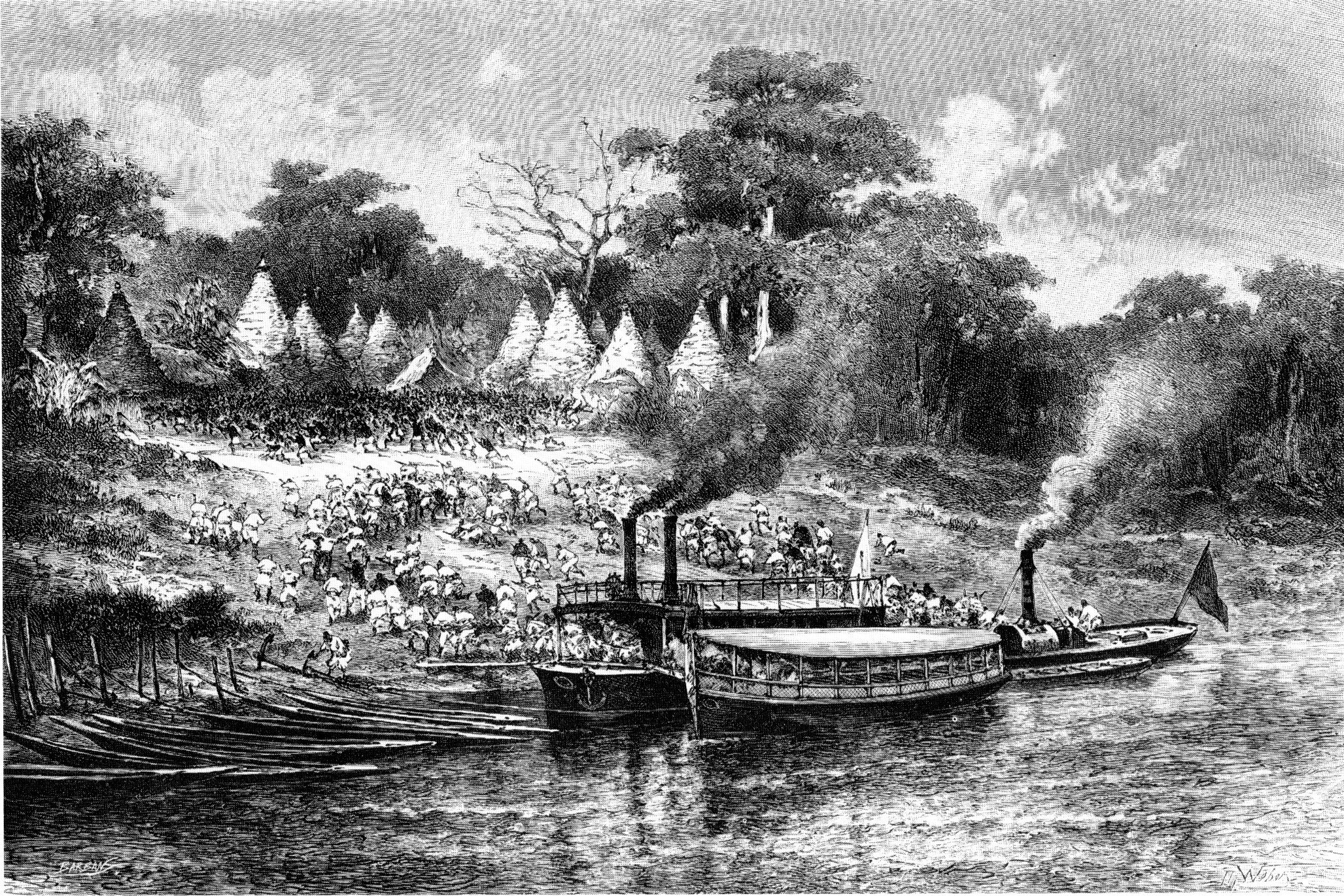
Relief expedition troops landing at Yambuya

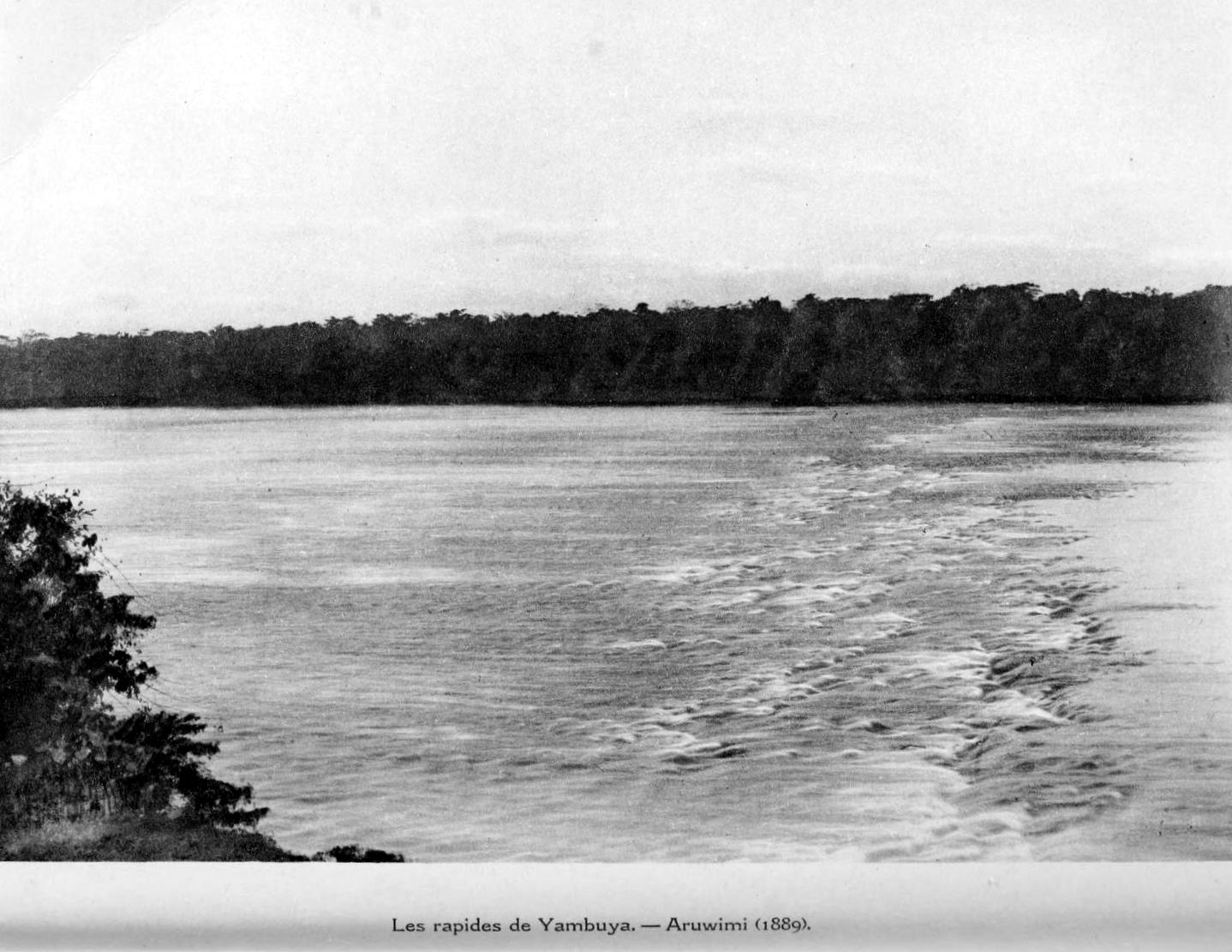
Rapids of Yambuya. - Aruwimi (1889)
