= Basoko =

- Commune
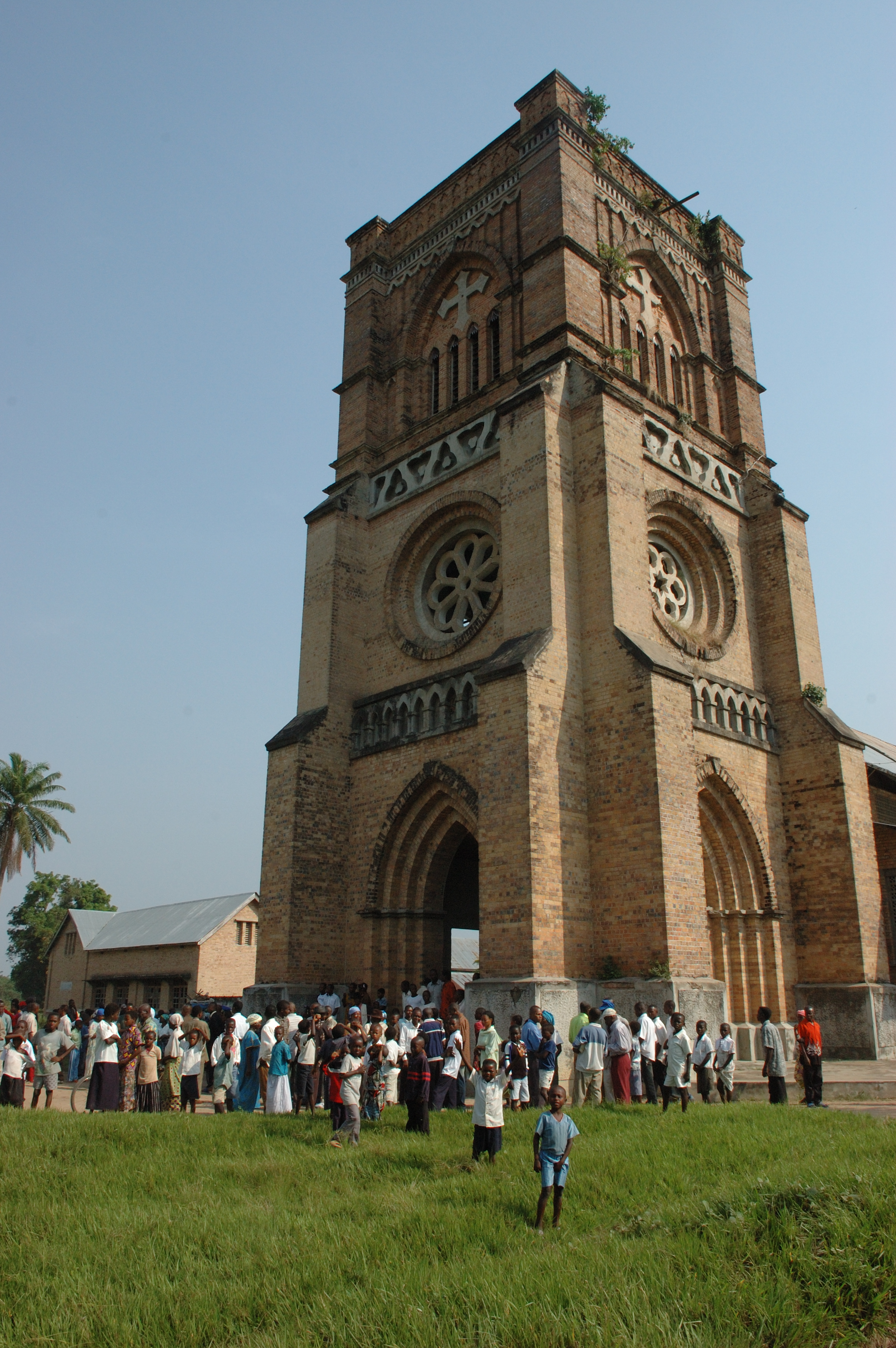

- Location in the Democratic Republic of the Congo
- Coordinates: 1°14′N 23°36′E
- Country: DR Congo
- Province: Tshopo
- Territory: Basoko

Population (2009)
  - Total: 47,970
- Time zone: UTC+2 (Central Africa Time)
- Climate: Af
- National language: Lingala

Basoko is a town on the Congo River in the Tshopo Province of the Democratic Republic of the Congo and is the administrative center of Basoko Territory. As of 2009 it had an estimated population of 47,970.

== Climate ==
Climate data for Basoko, elevation 366 m (1,201 ft), (1971–2000)
Month	Jan	Feb	Mar	Apr	May	Jun	Jul	Aug	Sep	Oct	Nov	Dec	Year
Mean daily maximum °C (°F)	31.0 (87.8)	31.7 (89.1)	31.6 (88.9)	30.9 (87.6)	30.6 (87.1)	29.8 (85.6)	29.1 (84.4)	29.2 (84.6)	29.9 (85.8)	29.9 (85.8)	29.9 (85.8)	30.0 (86.0)	30.3 (86.5)
Mean daily minimum °C (°F)	20.6 (69.1)	20.6 (69.1)	21.3 (70.3)	21.4 (70.5)	21.2 (70.2)	20.9 (69.6)	20.5 (68.9)	20.6 (69.1)	20.6 (69.1)	20.7 (69.3)	20.7 (69.3)	20.4 (68.7)	20.8 (69.4)
Average precipitation mm (inches)	66.0 (2.60)	86.0 (3.39)	150.0 (5.91)	186.0 (7.32)	180.0 (7.09)	111.0 (4.37)	137.0 (5.39)	147.0 (5.79)	175.0 (6.89)	215.0 (8.46)	177.0 (6.97)	95.0 (3.74)	1,725 (67.92)
Source: FAO

== Notable people ==
- George Grenfell, missionary
