= Ibembo =

- Location within Democratic Republic of the Congo
- Coordinates: 2.64964°N 23.61497°E
- Country: Democratic Republic of the Congo
- Province: Tshopo
- Elevation: 388 m (1,273 ft)

Ibembo is a village on the Itimbiri River in the Tshopo province of the Democratic Republic of the Congo.

== History ==
Ibembo was among the posts founded in 1890 by a Belgian expedition led by Léon Roget. Joseph Duvivier was placed in charge. Later, Ibembo was connected to Buta and Djabir by a railway track.

Jacques Mbali, Bishop of Buta, was born in Ibembo in 1921.

== Sources ==
- "Ibembo", Geonames.org
- Coosemans, M. (20 May 1946), "MILZ (Jules-Alexandre)", Biographie Belge d'Outre-Mer (in French), vol. I, Académie Royale des Sciences d'Outre-Mer, pp. 697–701
- Omasombo Tshonda, Jean (2014), Bas-Uele Pouvoirs locaux et économie agricole : héritages d’un passé brouillé (PDF) (in French), Musée royal de l’Afrique centrale, ISBN 978-9-4916-1586-3
