= List of lakes of the Democratic Republic of the Congo =

This is a list of lakes fully or partially within the borders of the Democratic Republic of the Congo.

- Lake albar
- Lake Albert (Lake Mobutu Sese Seko)
- Lake Ambale
- Lake Balukila
- Lake Batuli
- Lake Benaît
- Lake Bita
- Lake Boya
- Lake Delcommune (Lake Nzilo)
- Lake Dikolongo
- Lake Édouard (Lake Idi Amin)
- Lake Fwa
- Lake Gongalo
- Lake Kabamba
- Lake Kabele
- Lake Kabumba
- Lake Kabwe
- Lake Kalenga
- Lake Kalombwe
- Lake Kalumbe
- Lake Kana
- Lake Kapandwe
- Lake Kapondwe
- Lake Kapumbwe
- Lake Kasuku
- Lake Kayumba
- Lake Kazibaziba
- Lake Kibala
- Lake Kibunga
- Lake Kifukulu
- Lake Kilombwe
- Lake Kilumbe
- Lake Kinda
- Lake Kirwa
- Lake Kisale
- Lake Kishiba-Pande
- Lake Kitombole
- Lake Kitoponti
- Lake Kitulu
- Lake Kiubo
- Lake Kivu
- Lake Kuibo
- Lake Kwada
- Lake Libanda
- Lake Lukanga
- Lake Lukulu
- Lake Lunda
- Lake Lungwe
- Lake Lutembale
- Lake Mai-Ndombe (Lake Léopold II)
- Lake Makamba
- Lake Makambe
- Lake Mankamba
- Lake Mayumbwe
- Lake Molanda
- Lake Mugumba
- Lake Mukushi
- Lake Mulenda
- Lake Munkamba (Lake Mukamba)
- Lake Musala
- Lake Muyumbwe
- Lake Mwaba
- Lake Mwero
- Lake Mwipotondo
- Lake Nanu
- Lake Ndalaga
- Lake Niange
- Lake Nyangwe
- Lake Nyeba
- Lake Ondo
- Lake Paku
- Lake Showa
- Lake Tambe
- Lake Tanganyika
- Lake Tshangalele (Lake de Retenue de la Lufira)
- Lake Tukanga
- Lake Tukenga
- Lake Tumba
- Lake Tungwe
- Lake Upemba
- Lake Vundu
- Lake Zibanza
- Lake Ziba-Ziba
- Lake Zimbambo
