= Lualaba River =

River in the Democratic Republic of the Congo

Coordinates: 2°8′52″N 22°28′55″E

The Lualaba River, in red

The Lualaba River (French: Rivière Lualaba, Kongo: Nzâdi Luâlâmba, Swahili: Mto Lualamba) is a river within the Congo River watershed that flows entirely within the eastern part of Democratic Republic of the Congo. Although the Chambeshi River is recognized as the source of the Congo, the Lualaba provides the greatest streamflow to the Congo. The Lualaba is 1,800 kilometres (1,100 mi) long. Its headwaters are in the country's far southeastern corner near Musofi and Lubumbashi in Katanga Province, next to the Zambian Copperbelt.

== Course ==
The source of the Lualaba River is on the Katanga plateau, at an elevation of 1,400 metres (4,600 ft) above sea level. The river flows northward to end near Kisangani, where the name Congo River officially begins. From the Katanga plateau it drops, with waterfalls and rapids marking the descent, to the Manika plateau. As it descends through the upper Upemba Depression (Kamalondo Trough), 457 metres (1,499 ft) in 72 kilometres (45 mi). Near Nzilo Falls it is dammed for hydroelectric power at the Nzilo Dam.

At Bukama in Haut-Lomami District the river becomes navigable for about 640 kilometres (400 mi) through a series of marshy lakes in the lower Upemba Depression, including Lake Upemba and Lake Kisale. Ankoro lies on the west bank of the Lualaba River, opposite its confluence with the Luvua River from the east. Some geographers call the combined river below this point the "Upper Congo".

Below Kongolo, the river becomes unnavigable as it enters the narrow gorge of Portes d'Enfer (Gates of Hell). Between Kasongo and Kibombo, the river is navigable for about 100 kilometres (62 mi), before rapids make it unnavigable again between Kibombo and Kindu (Port-Empain). From Kindu up to the Boyoma Falls at Ubundu, the stream is navigable again for more than 300 kilometres. The Boyoma Falls or Stanley Falls are made up of seven cataracts, over a stretch of 100 kilometres (62 mi) of the river, between Ubundu and Kisangani. The river's end is marked after the seventh cataract, near Kisangani, where it becomes the Congo River.

The Lualaba River serves as the northern and western boundary of Upemba National Park, protecting habitats on the Kibara Plateau in Katanga Province of the southeastern Democratic Republic of the Congo.

=== Tributaries ===
The largest tributaries of the Lualaba River are:

- Ulindi River
- Luama River
- Lukuga River — drains Lake Tanganyika.
- Lufira River
- Lubudi River
- Luvua River
- Elila River
- Lowa
- Kilungutwe River

=== Cities and towns ===
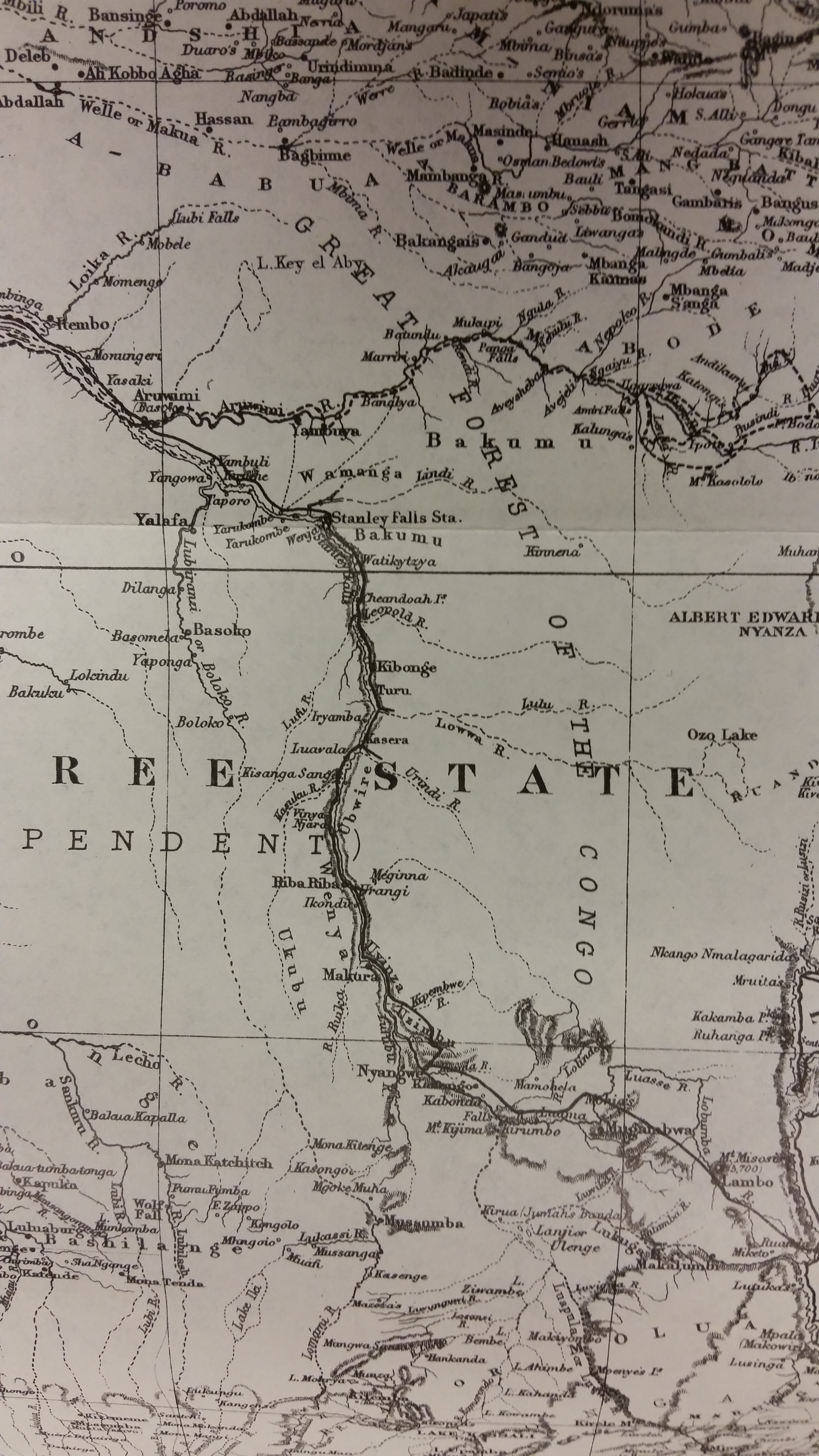
The black line indicates Stanley's route.

Cities and towns along and near the Lualaba River include:

- Ankoro —on west bank, opposite confluence with Luvua River.
- Bukama
- Kabalo
- Kasongo
- Kongolo
- Kisangani — near the seventh cataract of Boyoma Falls.
- Ubundu — just above first cataract of Boyoma Falls.

== History ==
The Lualaba River was once considered a possible source of the Nile, until Henry Morton Stanley journeyed down it and proved that it drained into the Atlantic Ocean. Stanley referred to it as the Livingstone. "Had not Livingstone spoken of the river at Nyangwe as the Lualaba, I should not have mentioned the word except as a corruption by the Waguha of the Wenya term Lu-al-ow-wa..."

French colonial governor Pierre Savorgnan de Brazza also explored the Lualaba.
