= List of World Heritage Sites in the Democratic Republic of the Congo =

Location of World Heritage Sites in Democratic Republic of the Congo

The United Nations Educational, Scientific and Cultural Organization (UNESCO) World Heritage Sites are places of importance to cultural or natural heritage as described in the UNESCO World Heritage Convention, established in 1972. Cultural heritage consists of monuments (such as architectural works, monumental sculptures, or inscriptions), groups of buildings, and sites (including archaeological sites). Natural features (consisting of physical and biological formations), geological and physiographical formations (including habitats of threatened species of animals and plants), and natural sites which are important from the point of view of science, conservation or natural beauty, are defined as natural heritage. The Democratic Republic of the Congo accepted the convention on 23 September 1974, making its historical sites eligible for inclusion on the list.

There are five World Heritage Sites in the country, all of them listed for their natural significance. Virunga National Park was the first site in DRC to be listed, in 1979. Four sites are currently listed as endangered because of threats such as poaching and deforestation. Salonga National Park was listed as endangered between 1999 and 2021. There are also four sites on the tentative list.

== World Heritage Sites ==
UNESCO lists sites under ten criteria; each entry must meet at least one of the criteria. Criteria i through vi are cultural, and vii through x are natural.

† In danger

World Heritage Sites
Site	Image	Location (province)	Year listed	UNESCO data	Description
Virunga National Park†	A mountain gorilla	North Kivu, Ituri	1979	63; vii, viii, x (natural)	Virunga National Park spans an active chain of volcanoes in the Rwenzori Mountains, the highest of which reach above 5,000 m (16,000 ft) and are covered by permanent glaciers. They are part of the East African Rift. With a wide range of different habitats, from Afromontane forests to marshes, steppes, and lowland forests, it is rich in biodiversity and home to species such as the mountain gorilla (pictured), eastern lowland gorilla, chimpanzee, large numbers of hippopotamus, as well as endangered species such as the okapi and Ruwenzori duiker. Since 1994, the site has been listed as endangered because of threats to wildlife, including poaching and deforestation.
Garamba National Park†	An aerial look at the savanna and river scenery	Haut-Uele	1980	136bis; ix, x (natural)	The park is located at the transition between tropical forests and the West Sudanian savanna. It comprises a mosaic of habitats, including savanna, gallery forest, swamps, and grasslands. Large mammals in the park include the elephant, giraffe, hippopotamus, lion, spotted hyena, and several antelope species. At the time of the inscription, the park was home to the last wild population of the northern white rhinoceros (possibly extinct in the wild now). Mainly because of threats to rhinos due to poaching, the site was listed as endangered in 1984. As the situation improved, it was removed from the list in 1992 and then relisted again in 1996 when poaching resumed.
Kahuzi-Biéga National Park†	Aerial view at a tropical forest	North Kivu, South Kivu, Maniema	1980	137; x (natural)	Located in the East African Rift, the park is mainly covered by tropical forest that is home to the endangered eastern lowland gorilla, as well as threatened primates such as the chimpanzee, black-and-white colobus, L'Hoest's monkey, and Hamlyn's monkey. Other mammals in the park include the giant forest hog, aquatic genet, giant forest genet, and bongo. The park comprises subalpine habitats on the slopes of two extinct volcanoes. Since 1997, the site has been listed as endangered because of the political instability of the region, an influx of refugees, and increasing wildlife exploitation.
Salonga National Park	An aerial view of a river in a tropical forest	Tshuapa, Sankuru, Kasaï, Mai-Ndombe	1984	280; viii, ix (natural)	The national park covers large, mostly undisturbed, and largely inaccessible areas covered with tropical rainforests, marshlands, and gallery forests. Some parts have never been scientifically explored. The park is composed of two distinct sections, thus in future connecting corridors will need to be established between them. Some of the animals that live in the park include the bonobo, Congo peafowl, African forest elephant, and Central African slender-snouted crocodile. From 1999 to 2021, the site was listed as endangered because of increased poaching, illegal encroachment, and impact due to armed conflict.
Okapi Wildlife Reserve†	A zoo specimen of okapi	Haut-Uele, Ituri	1997	718; x (natural)	The wildlife reserve is located in the Ituri Rainforest. As a Pleistocene refugium, the forest contains dense evergreen and semi-evergreen forests dominated by Mbau trees (Gilbertiodendron dewevrei). It is home to okapi (a zoo specimen pictured), as well as six species of duiker, aquatic genet, giant forest genet, and 17 species of primates, including chimpanzee. The reserve is also home to the traditional nomadic Mbuti and Efé pygmy people. Since 1997, the site has been listed as endangered because of poaching, looting, and illegal gold mining in the area.

== Tentative list ==
In addition to sites inscribed on the World Heritage List, member states can maintain a list of tentative sites that they may consider for nomination. Nominations for the World Heritage List are only accepted if the site was previously listed on the tentative list. The Democratic Republic of the Congo maintains five properties on its tentative list.

Tentative sites
Site	Image	Location (province)	Year listed	UNESCO criteria	Description
Dimba and Ngovo caves		Kongo Central	1997	(mixed)	Dimba and Ngovo caves are archaeological sites with a long archaeological sequence of finds. Excavations have uncovered remains of lithic tools and pottery fragments from the Late Stone Age (from 18,050 to 650 BCE), as well as pottery fragments from the 16th and 17th centuries.
Matupi Cave		Ituri	1997	(mixed)	The cave is an archaeological site with traces of human occupation spanning over 40,000 years over the Late Stone Age. The cave has some of the earliest evidence in the world for microlithic tool technologies.
Upemba Depression	Satellite image, false colour, of a lake in a depression	Haut-Lomami	1997	(mixed)	Upemba Depression (satellite image pictured) has the largest cemeteries in Subsaharan Africa, with more than 40 archaeological sites, six of which have been partially explored. They span from around 2300 BCE to the 20th century. They include the Kisalian Graves and illustrate the history of the Luba people who live in the area.
Lomami National Park	A monkey with a black face in a forest	Maniema, Tshopo	2024	ix, x (natural)	The national park is located in the eastern part of the Congo Basin. It is covered by dense tropical forests and savannas. The Lomami River, that forms the western barrier of the park, acts as a biogeographical barrier and has influenced the evolution of animals; for example, the bonobo populations on the two banks of the river are genetically and morphologically different. Other animals that live in the park include the okapi, Congo peafowl, African forest elephant, Dryas monkey (pictured), and lesula, a monkey species that was discovered as recently as in 2012.
Garamba National Park		Haut-Uélé	2024	ix, x (natural)	[icon]
