= Pagria liturata =

Scientific classification
- Kingdom: Animalia
- Phylum: Arthropoda
- Clade: Pancrustacea
- Class: Insecta
- Order: Coleoptera
- Suborder: Polyphaga
- Infraorder: Cucujiformia
- Family: Chrysomelidae
- Genus: Pagria
- Species: P. liturata

Binomial name
- Pagria liturata Lefèvre, 1891

Species of beetle

Pagria liturata is a species of leaf beetle distributed in Angola, the Democratic Republic of the Congo (Garamba and Upemba National Parks), Ethiopia and South Sudan. It was described by Édouard Lefèvre in 1891. Its host plants include Vitex doniana and Sporobolus pyramidalis.
