= Scopula nipha =

Scientific classification
- Domain: Eukaryota
- Kingdom: Animalia
- Phylum: Arthropoda
- Class: Insecta
- Order: Lepidoptera
- Family: Geometridae
- Genus: Scopula
- Species: S. nipha

Binomial name
- Scopula nipha D. S. Fletcher, 1955

Species of geometer moth in subfamily Sterrhinae

Scopula nipha is a moth of the family Geometridae. It was described by David Stephen Fletcher in 1955. It is found in the Democratic Republic of the Congo.

The male has a wingspan of 21–23 mm. This species was described from a specimen collected at the Upemba National Park
