= Pagria =

Scientific classification
- Kingdom: Animalia
- Phylum: Arthropoda
- Clade: Pancrustacea
- Class: Insecta
- Order: Coleoptera
- Suborder: Polyphaga
- Infraorder: Cucujiformia
- Family: Chrysomelidae
- Subfamily: Eumolpinae
- Tribe: Typophorini
- Genus: Pagria; Lefèvre, 1884

Type species
- Pagria suturalis Lefèvre, 1884

Synonyms
- Colposcelis Chevrolat in Dejean, 1836 (nec Dejean, 1834); Odontionopa Motschulsky, 1866 (nec Chevrolat in Dejean, 1836); Aphthonesthis Weise, 1895

Genus of leaf beetles

Pagria is a genus of leaf beetles in the subfamily Eumolpinae. It is known from Africa, Asia and Australia.

== Species ==
The following species are placed in the genus:

- Pagria annulicornis Pic, 1950 – mainland Southeast Asia
- Pagria apicalis Pic, 1940 – Angola
- Pagria australis Bryant, 1942 – Australia
- Pagria bengalensis Moseyko & Medvedev, 2005 – India
- Pagria bipustulata (Baly, 1867) – Borneo
- Pagria bisignata Pic, 1949
- Pagria brevenotata Pic, 1952 – Benin
- Pagria burmanica Jacoby, 1908 – Myanmar
- Pagria camerunensis (Jacoby, 1904) – Cameroon
- Pagria ceylonica Pic, 1929 – Sri Lanka
- Pagria concinna (Weise, 1895) – Ghana, Ivory Coast
- Pagria concolor (Motschulsky, 1866) – Java
- Pagria conglomerata Jacoby, 1908 – Southern India
- Pagria consimilis (Baly, 1874) – Japan, South Korea, Russian Far East, Taiwan, Lombok, Sumatra
- Pagria dahomeyensis Pic, 1952 – Benin
- Pagria donckieri Pic, 1950 – Sumatra
- Pagria fossulata Pic, 1952 – Ethiopia
- Pagria gossypii Bryant, 1933 – Nigeria
- Pagria grata (Baly, 1867) – India, Nepal, China, Taiwan, Japan, North Korea, South Korea, Laos, Vietnam, Thailand, Myanmar, Philippines, Sumatra, Java, New Britain
- Pagria ingibbosa Pic, 1929 – India, Nepal, China, Japan, Ryukyu Islands, Vietnam, Thailand, Singapore, Malaysia, Sumba, Lombok
- Pagria laotica Moseyko, 2013 – Laos
- Pagria liturata Lefèvre, 1891 – Angola, DR Congo, Ethiopia, South Sudan
- Pagria maculata Moseyko & Medvedev, 2005 – Vietnam
- Pagria mahembensis (Selman, 1965) – Rwanda
- Pagria maynei Burgeon, 1941 – DR Congo
- Pagria minuta Pic, 1949 – Ivory Coast
- Pagria muiri Bryant, 1942 – Tanimbar Islands (Larat), Philippines
- Pagria nigrosuturalis (Bryant, 1960) – Tanzania
- Pagria pici Moseyko & Medvedev, 2005 – Vietnam
- Pagria porosicollis (Jacoby, 1898) – Cameroon
- Pagria pseudograta Moseyko, 2012 – Sri Lanka
- Pagria restituens (Walker, 1859) – Sri Lanka
- Pagria ruficeps Pic, 1949 – Sierra Leone, Benin
- Pagria rufoscutellaris Pic, 1940 – Angola
- Pagria ruwenzoriensis Selman, 1972 – DR Congo
- Pagria sexmaculata Kimoto & Gressitt, 1982 – Thailand, Laos
- Pagria signata (Motschulsky, 1858) – Southwestern China (Yunnan: Xishuangbanna), India, Vietnam, Laos, Thailand, Myanmar, Malaysia
- Pagria sumatrensis Lefèvre, 1887 – Sumatra, Borneo (Sabah)
- Pagria suturalis Lefèvre, 1884 – East Africa, DR Congo, Uganda, South Sudan
- Pagria ussuriensis Moseyko & Medvedev, 2005 – Russian Far East, Northeast China, North Korea, South Korea, Japan
- Pagria varians Lefèvre, 1884 – East Africa, DR Congo, South Sudan, Ivory Coast
- Pagria vietnamica Moseyko & Medvedev, 2005 – Vietnam, Thailand
- Pagria viridiaenea (Gyllenhal, 1808) – "East India", Sri Lanka

Species moved to other genera:

- Pagria aenescens Jacoby, 1908: moved to Cleoporus
- Pagria laevifrons Jacoby, 1908: moved to Cleoporus
- Pagria minor Pic, 1929: moved to Basilepta
- Pagria monardi Pic, 1940: moved to Sarum
- Pagria pallidicolor Pic, 1929: moved to Basilepta
- Pagria plicata Pic, 1929: moved to Basilepta
- Pagria recticollis Pic, 1929: moved to Cleoporus

Other synonyms:

- Pagria aenea (Motschulsky, 1866): synonym of Pagria restituens (Walker, 1859)
- Pagria aeneicollis Lefèvre, 1890: synonym of Pagria grata (Baly, 1867)
- Pagria bipunctata Lefèvre, 1891: synonym of Pagria signata (Motschulsky, 1858)
- Pagria ceylonensis Jacoby, 1908: synonym of Pagria viridiaenea (Gyllenhal, 1808)
- Pagria costatipennis Jacoby, 1887: synonym of Pagria restituens (Walker, 1859)
- Pagria diversepunctata Pic, 1950: synonym of Pagria signata (Motschulsky, 1858)
- Pagria flavopustulata (Baly, 1874): synonym of Pagria grata (Baly, 1867)
- Pagria kanarensis (Jacoby, 1895): synonym of Pagria grata (Baly, 1867)
- Pagria lineolata Pic, 1949: synonym of Pagria ingibbosa Pic, 1929
- Pagria nodieri Pic, 1949: synonym of Pagria grata (Baly, 1867)
- Pagria vignaphila Bryant, 1942: synonym of Pagria grata (Baly, 1867)
- Pagria xanthopus (Harold, 1874): synonym of Pagria grata (Baly, 1867)
