= Pagria varians =

Scientific classification
- Kingdom: Animalia
- Phylum: Arthropoda
- Clade: Pancrustacea
- Class: Insecta
- Order: Coleoptera
- Suborder: Polyphaga
- Infraorder: Cucujiformia
- Family: Chrysomelidae
- Genus: Pagria
- Species: P. varians

Binomial name
- Pagria varians Lefèvre, 1884

Species of beetle

Pagria varians is a species of leaf beetle distributed in East Africa (Kenya, Tanzania), the Democratic Republic of the Congo (Garamba and Upemba National Parks), South Sudan, and Ivory Coast. It was described by Édouard Lefèvre in 1884. Its host plants include Combretum spp.
