= Pagria suturalis =

Scientific classification
- Kingdom: Animalia
- Phylum: Arthropoda
- Clade: Pancrustacea
- Class: Insecta
- Order: Coleoptera
- Suborder: Polyphaga
- Infraorder: Cucujiformia
- Family: Chrysomelidae
- Genus: Pagria
- Species: P. suturalis

Binomial name
- Pagria suturalis Lefèvre, 1884

Synonyms
- Pagria suturalis ab. maculata Weise, 1909

Species of beetle

Pagria suturalis is a species of leaf beetle distributed in East Africa (including Kenya and Tanzania), the Democratic Republic of the Congo (Garamba and Upemba National Parks), Uganda and South Sudan. It was described by Édouard Lefèvre in 1884. Its host plants include Erythrophleum guineense.
