= Lake Kisale =

Body of water

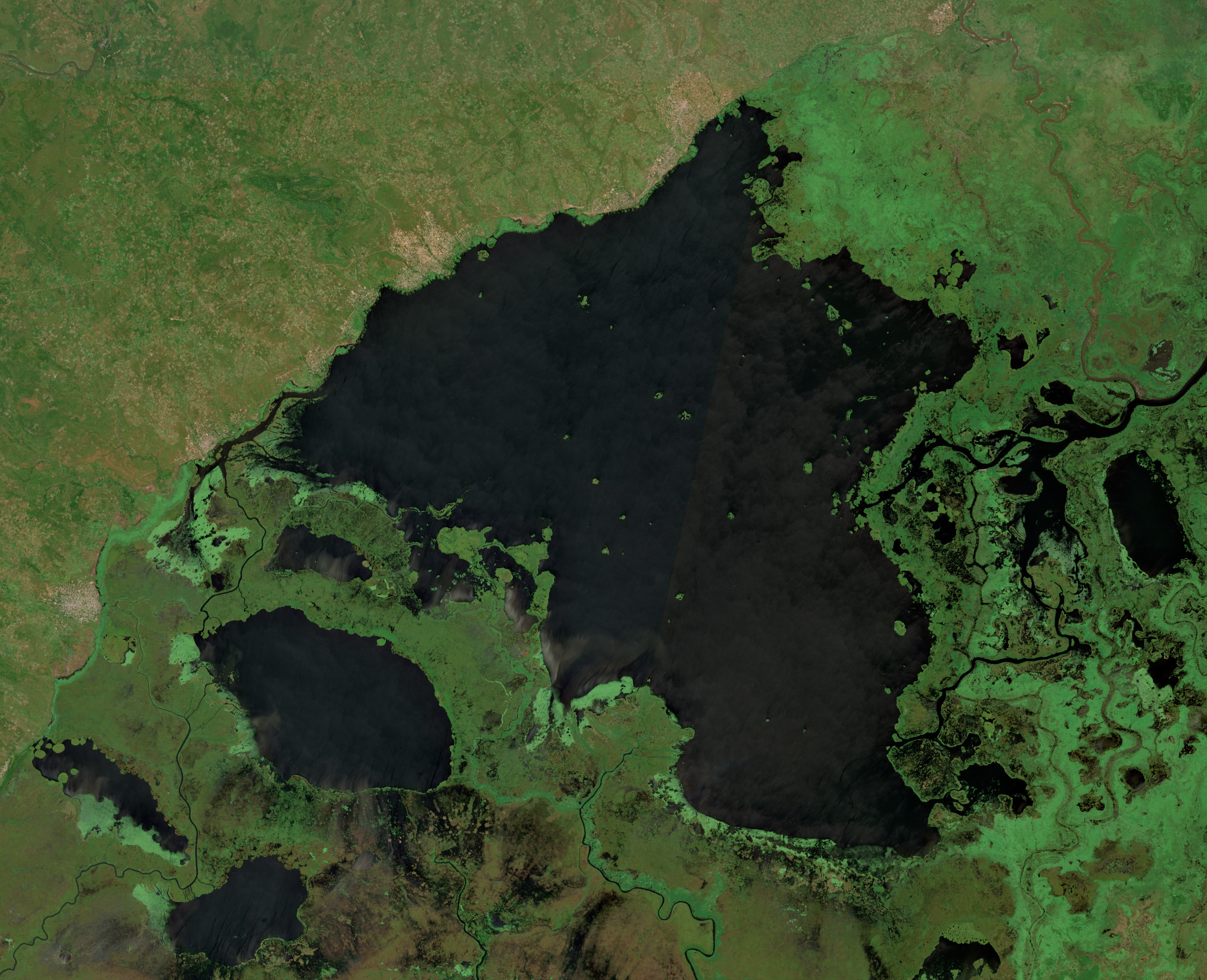
- Lake Kasale in May 2026. The meandering Lualaba River flows out of the lake to the east.

- Location within Democratic Republic of the Congo Location within Africa
- Coordinates: 8°15′28″S 26°30′14″E
- Basin countries: Democratic Republic of the Congo
- Surface area: 300 km^{2} (120 sq mi)
- Settlements: Kikondja, Buya Bwa Dalamba

Lake Kisale is a lake in the Democratic Republic of the Congo (DRC), in Bukama Territory, Haut-Lomami District. At about 300 square kilometres (120 sq mi) in area, it is the second largest of the lakes in the Upemba Depression (Kamolondo Depression), an extensive marshy area partly within the Upemba National Park.

== Geography ==
The Lualaba River enters the Upemba Depression about 40 kilometres (25 mi) after leaving Lake Nzilo (Delcommune reservoir). The depression is a trough-like graben about 400 kilometres (250 mi) long and 100 kilometres (62 mi) wide, running from the southwest to the northeast. The trough is about 1,000 metres (3,300 ft) above sea level at its southwest end, sloping steeply down to an elevation of 610 metres (2,000 ft), where it flattens out and is filled by lakes and marshes for a distance of 225 kilometres (140 mi) in a belt that is 37 kilometres (23 mi) wide on average. The river generally flows through the marshes between the lakes, to which it is connected by narrow channels. However, as it flows through lakes Lake Kabwe and Lake Kisale, these may be seen as expansions of the river bed.

== History ==
In 1957 pottery and metal objects were excavated from an Iron Age cemetery discovered at Sanga on the northern shore of the lake. The site provides evidence for the origins of the Luba people of present-day Zambia and the DRC, thought to be one of the first groups to work with iron in Central Africa. By 800 CE they were living in permanent settlements by the lakes, marshes and rivers of the region.

The soil is fertile, supporting productive farms for crops such as sorghum and millet, while fish and game provided sources of protein. The population grew and society became more complex. Grave goods include copper artifacts which must have been obtained by trading with people of the copper belt further to the south.
