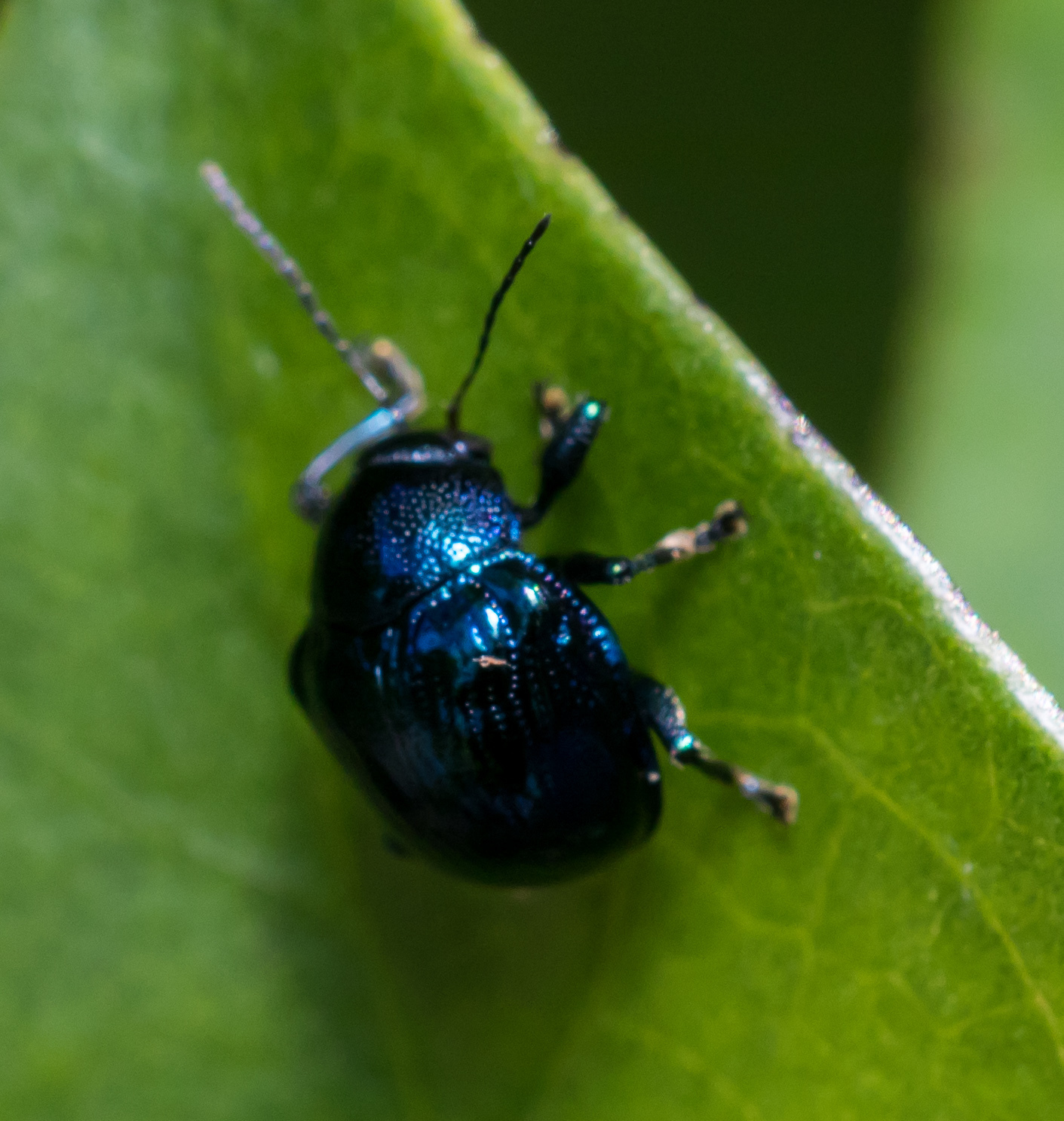
- Cleorina janthina

Scientific classification
- Kingdom: Animalia
- Phylum: Arthropoda
- Clade: Pancrustacea
- Class: Insecta
- Order: Coleoptera
- Suborder: Polyphaga
- Infraorder: Cucujiformia
- Family: Chrysomelidae
- Subfamily: Eumolpinae
- Tribe: Typophorini
- Genus: Cleorina; Lefèvre, 1885

Type species
- Cleorina aulica (= Nodostoma aeneomicans Baly, 1867) Lefèvre, 1885

Synonyms
- Basilepta Weise, 1923 (nec Baly, 1860)

= Cleorina =

Genus of leaf beetles

Cleorina is a genus of leaf beetles in the subfamily Eumolpinae. It is distributed in South, East and Southeast Asia, New Guinea and Australia.

Cleorina modiglianii, a species found in Sumatra, was considered as a potential biological control agent for the giant bramble (Rubus alceifolius), an invasive plant species in La Réunion, but was rejected after testing its host specificity.

== Species ==
Species include:

- Cleorina aeneomicans (Baly, 1867) – Peninsular Malaysia, Java
- Cleorina andamanensis Jacoby, 1908 – Andaman Islands
- Cleorina assamensis Jacoby, 1908 – India (Assam, Sikkim, Darjeeling district)
- Cleorina basalis (Baly, 1867) – Java
- Cleorina basipennis Medvedev, 1995 – Philippines (Mindanao)
- Cleorina bevani (Baly, 1877) – India (Sikkim), Southern India
- Cleorina bicolor Jacoby, 1908 – Myanmar (Tanintharyi Region)
- Cleorina bicoloripes Pic, 1937 – Vietnam
- Cleorina borneoensis Medvedev & Romantsov, 2014 – Borneo (Sabah)
- Cleorina bosi Medvedev, 2008 – Sulawesi
- Cleorina bryanti Medvedev, 2009 – Papua New Guinea
- Cleorina buechi Medvedev, 2008 – Sulawesi
- Cleorina castanea Lefèvre, 1885 – Philippines
- Cleorina chlorina Takizawa, 1988 – Nepal, India (Sikkim)
- Cleorina collaris (Baly, 1867) – Borneo (Sarawak)
- Cleorina costata Tan & Wang, 1981 – China (Xizang)
- Cleorina costatella Medvedev, 2009 – Vietnam
- Cleorina cyrtopus (Lefèvre, 1885) – Philippines
- Cleorina dohertyi Jacoby, 1908 – Myanmar (Tanintharyi Region)
- Cleorina dura (Weise, 1923) – Australia
- Cleorina femorata Medvedev, 2009 – Western New Guinea
- Cleorina flavipes Medvedev, 2009 – Western New Guinea, Papua New Guinea
- Cleorina flavoornata Medvedev, 1995 – Philippines (Luzon)
- Cleorina fulva Jacoby, 1908 – Southern India, Nepal
- Cleorina fulvicornis Medvedev, 2008 – Sulawesi
- Cleorina fulvipes Lefèvre, 1890 – Sulawesi
- Cleorina fulvitarsis Lefèvre, 1887 – Peninsular Malaysia, Sumatra
- Cleorina gestroi Jacoby, 1896 – Sumatra
- Cleorina gorbunovi Medvedev, 2008 – Sulawesi
- Cleorina grandis Eroshkina, 1988 – Vietnam
- Cleorina hainana Gressitt & Kimoto, 1961 – China (Hainan), Thailand, Laos, Vietnam
- Cleorina hirticollis Bryant, 1950 – Western New Guinea, Papua New Guinea
- Cleorina imperialis (Baly, 1867) – Peninsular Malaysia, Sumatra
- Cleorina indica Jacoby, 1908 – Myanmar (Tanintharyi Region)
- Cleorina instriata Pic, 1937 – China (Yunnan)
- Cleorina jacobyi Duvivier, 1892 – India (Sikkim), Nepal
- Cleorina janthina Lefèvre, 1885 – China, Nepal, Bhutan, India, Myanmar, Indochina
- Cleorina laeta Medvedev, 1995 – Philippines (Luzon)
- Cleorina longicornica Tan, 1992 – China (Yunnan)
- Cleorina longicornis Jacoby, 1908 – Myanmar (Tanintharyi Region)
- Cleorina luzonica Medvedev, 1995 – Philippines (Luzon)
- Cleorina major Kimoto & Gressitt, 1982 – Laos
- Cleorina malayana Jacoby, 1896 – Sumatra
- Cleorina manipurensis Jacoby, 1908 – India (Manipur)
- Cleorina metallica Lefèvre, 1885 – Java
- Cleorina metallica Shukla, 1960 (homonym) – India (Himachal Pradesh)
- Cleorina mimica Medvedev & Eroshkina, 1983 – Vietnam
- Cleorina mjoebergi (Weise, 1923) – Australia
- Cleorina modesta Jacoby, 1908 – India (Naga Hills)
- Cleorina modiglianii Jacoby, 1896 – Sumatra
- Cleorina morosa Lefèvre, 1885 – Philippines
- Cleorina nepalensis (Chûjô, 1966) – India (Sikkim, Darjeeling district), Nepal
- Cleorina nigricornis Medvedev, 2009 – Western New Guinea
- Cleorina nigrita Jacoby, 1895 – Borneo
- Cleorina nigroviridis Jacoby, 1908 – India (Assam)
- Cleorina nitidia Tan, 1981 – China (Xizang)
- Cleorina nitidicollis Tan & Wang, 1981 – China (Xizang)
- Cleorina nobilis Lefèvre, 1885 – India, Myanmar
- Cleorina oblonga Jacoby, 1908 – Myanmar (Karen Hills)
- Cleorina ornata Jacoby, 1896 – Sumatra
- Cleorina papuana Bryant, 1950 – Papua New Guinea
- Cleorina philippinensis Jacoby, 1898 – Philippines
- Cleorina pulchella Lefèvre, 1885 – Australia
- Cleorina pulchra Medvedev, 2009 – Western New Guinea
- Cleorina puncticollis Jacoby, 1894 – Peninsular Malaysia
- Cleorina punctipleuris Medvedev, 2008 – Sulawesi
- Cleorina punctisterna Medvedev & Eroshkina, 1983 – Vietnam
- Cleorina purpurea Lea, 1915 – Australia
- Cleorina purpureipennis (Baly, 1867) – Peninsular Malaysia
- Cleorina riedeli Medvedev, 2009 – Papua New Guinea
- Cleorina robusta Takizawa & Basu, 1987 – India (Sikkim)
- Cleorina schawalleri Medvedev, 2009 – Papua New Guinea
- Cleorina sculpturata (Motschulsky, 1860) – Myanmar
- Cleorina semipurpurea Jacoby, 1905 – Papua New Guinea (Ighibirei)
- Cleorina splendida Bryant, 1950 – Papua New Guinea (Kokoda)
- Cleorina splendida Tan, 1992 (homonym) – China (Yunnan)
- Cleorina strigicollis Medvedev & Eroshkina, 1983 – Vietnam
- Cleorina strigosipleuris Medvedev, 2015 – China (Yunnan)
- Cleorina subnodosa Gressitt & Kimoto, 1961 – China (Hainan)
- Cleorina substriata Medvedev, 2016 – Peninsular Malaysia
- Cleorina sulawensis Medvedev, 2008 – Sulawesi
- Cleorina sumatrana Jacoby, 1899 – Peninsular Malaysia, Sumatra
- Cleorina sumatrensis Lefèvre, 1885 – Sumatra
- Cleorina suturata Jacoby, 1899 – Bengal
- Cleorina takizawai Medvedev & Sprecher-Uebersax, 1999 – India (Sikkim, Darjeeling district), Nepal
- Cleorina tibialis Lefèvre, 1885 – Philippines
- Cleorina verrucosa Medvedev, 2008 – Sulawesi
- Cleorina vietnamica Medvedev & Eroshkina, 1983 – Vietnam
- Cleorina viridis (Baly, 1867) – Sumatra
- Cleorina viridissima Jacoby, 1905 – Western New Guinea, Papua New Guinea
- Cleorina xizangensis Tan & Wang, 1981 – China (Xizang)

Synonyms:

- Cleorina bella (Jacoby, 1892): synonym of Cleorina janthina Lefèvre, 1885
- Cleorina bhamoensis (Jacoby, 1892): synonym of Cleorina sculpturata (Motschulsky, 1860)
- Cleorina capitata (Jacoby, 1892): synonym of Cleorina sculpturata (Motschulsky, 1860)
- Cleorina lefevrei Jacoby, 1890: synonym of Cleorina janthina Lefèvre, 1885
- Cleorina purpureipennis var. purpureicollis Pic, 1937: synonym of Cleorina janthina Lefèvre, 1885
- Cleorina purpureipennis var. violaceipennis Pic, 1937: synonym of Cleorina janthina Lefèvre, 1885

Renamed species:

- Cleorina costata Medvedev & Eroshkina, 1983: renamed to Cleorina costatella Medvedev, 2009
- Cleorina nepalensis Takizawa, 1985 (preoccupied by Cleorina nepalensis (Chûjô, 1966)): renamed to Cleorina takizawai Medvedev & Sprecher-Uebersax, 1999
