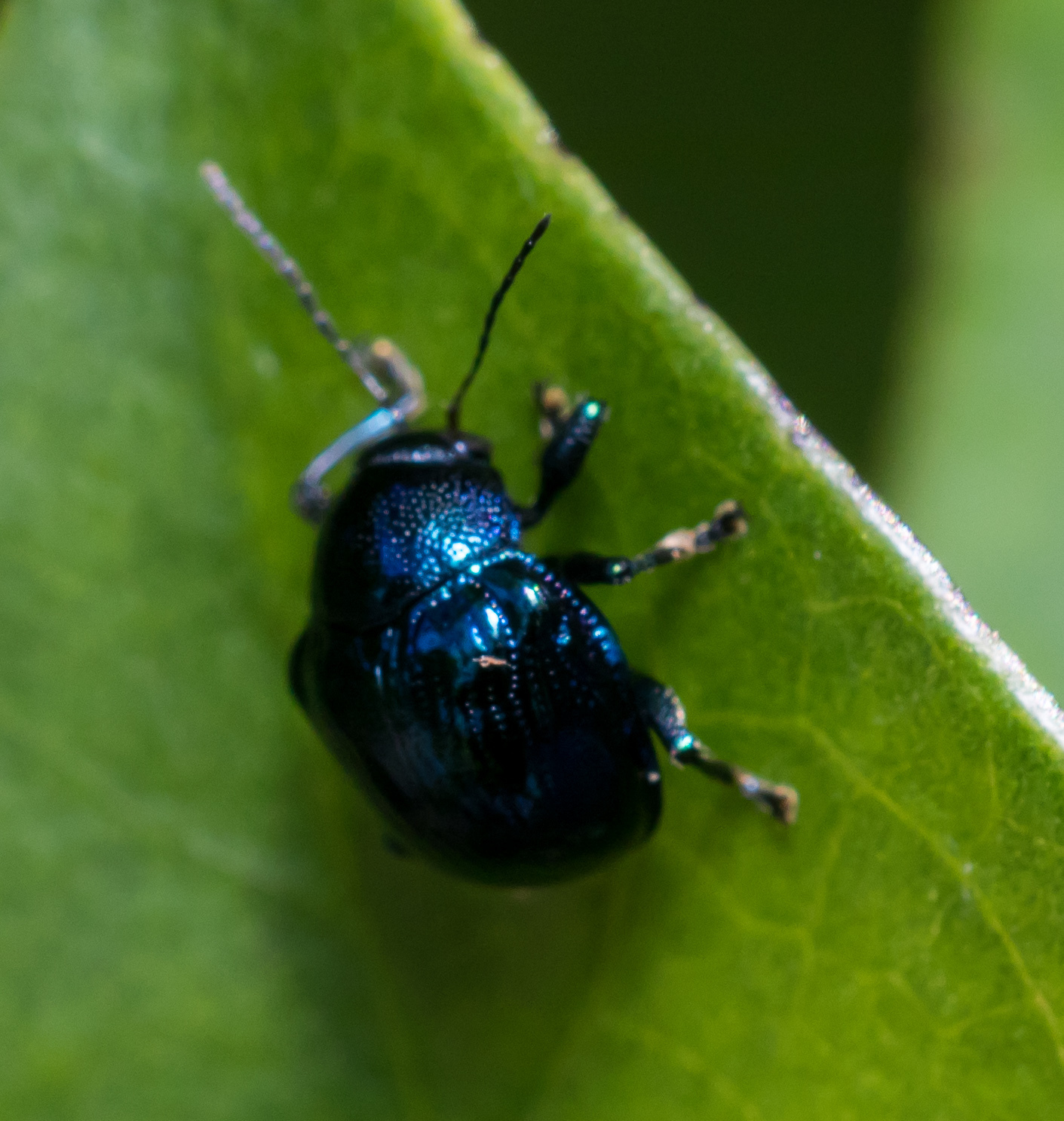
- Cleorina janthina

Scientific classification
- Kingdom: Animalia
- Phylum: Arthropoda
- Clade: Pancrustacea
- Class: Insecta
- Order: Coleoptera
- Suborder: Polyphaga
- Infraorder: Cucujiformia
- Family: Chrysomelidae
- Genus: Cleorina
- Species: C. janthina

Binomial name
- Cleorina janthina Lefèvre, 1885

Synonyms
- Cleorina lefevrei Jacoby, 1890; Nodostoma bellum Jacoby, 1892; Cleorina purpureipennis var. purpureicollis Pic, 1937; Cleorina purpureipennis var. violaceipennis Pic, 1937

= Cleorina janthina =

Species of beetles

Cleorina janthina is a species of beetle in the leaf beetle family (Chrysomelidae), distributed in India, Nepal, China, Bhutan, Myanmar and Indochina. The scientific name of the species was published in 1885 by Édouard Lefèvre, who described it from Hong Kong.
