= Lake Zimbambo =

Lake in the Democratic Republic of the Congo

Zimbambo
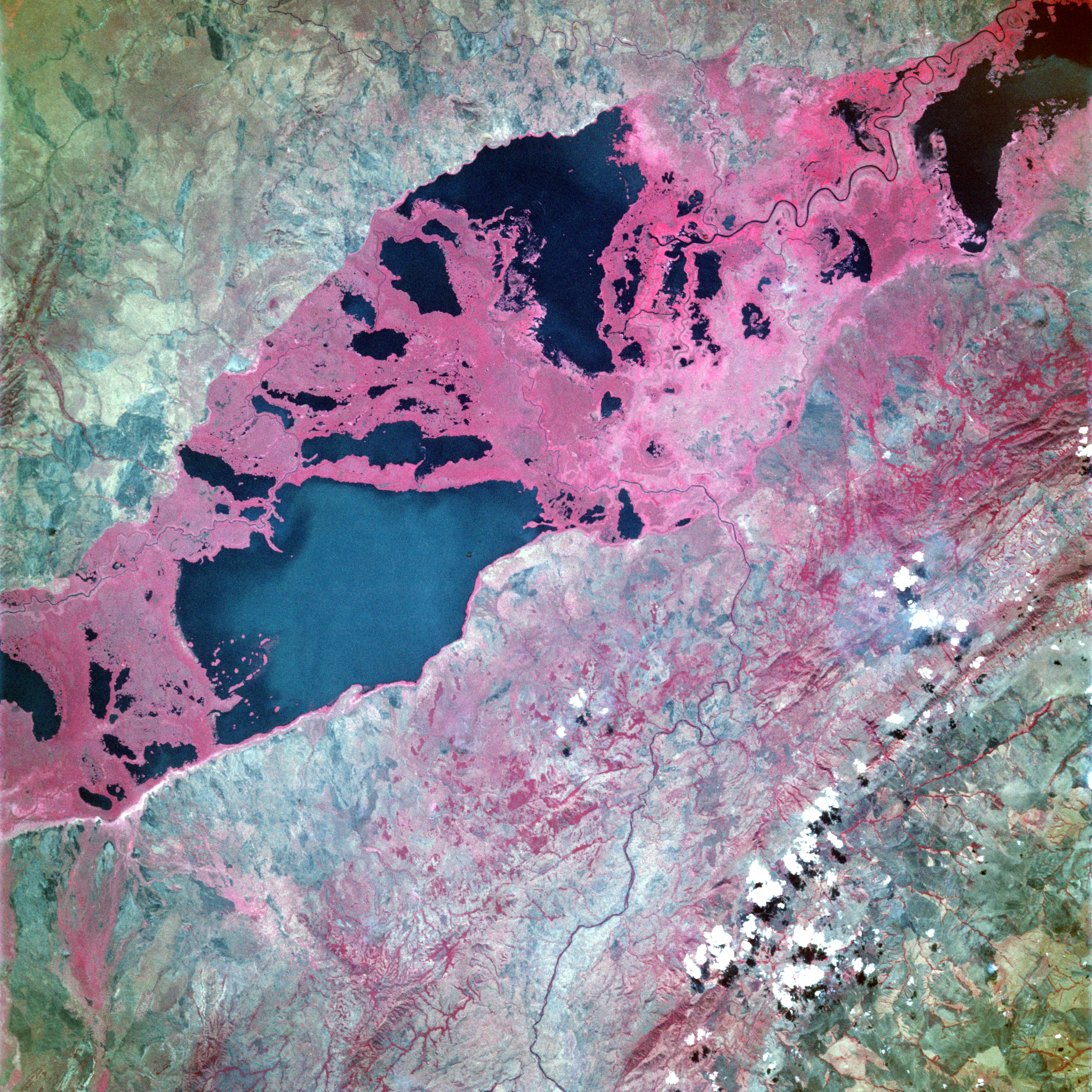
- Upemba Depression lakes. Zimbambo to the extreme northeast

- Location within Democratic Republic of the Congo Location within Africa
- Coordinates: 8.09662°S 26.861401°E
- Basin countries: Democratic Republic of the Congo
- Surface area: 150 square kilometres (58 sq mi)
- Surface elevation: 1,200 metres (3,900 ft)

Lake Zimbambo is a lake in the Malemba-Nkulu Territory of Haut-Lomami Province, in the southern Democratic Republic of the Congo.

It is one of the lakes in the Upemba Depression, an extensive marshy area.

The Lualaba River enters the depression about 40 kilometres (25 mi) after leaving Lake Delcommune.

The depression is a trough-like graben about 400 kilometres (250 mi) long and 100 kilometres (62 mi) wide, running from the southwest to the northeast. The trough is about 1,000 metres (3,300 ft) above sea level at its southwest end, sloping steeply down to an elevation of 610 metres (2,000 ft), where it flattens out and is filled by lakes and marshes for a distance of 225 kilometres (140 mi) in a belt that is 37 kilometres (23 mi) wide on average.

The river generally flows through the marshes between the lakes, to which it is connected by narrow channels.
