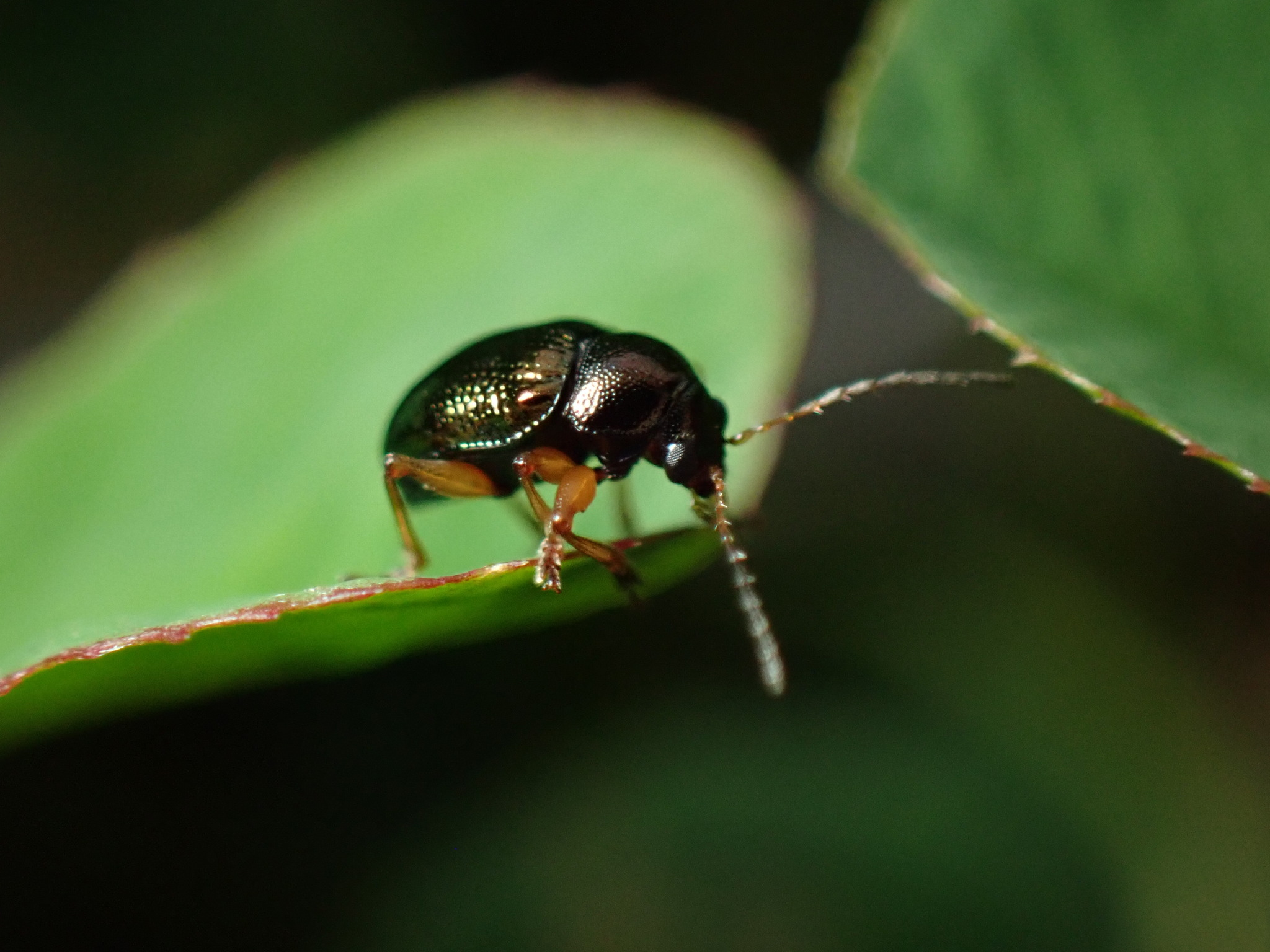

Scientific classification
- Kingdom: Animalia
- Phylum: Arthropoda
- Clade: Pancrustacea
- Class: Insecta
- Order: Coleoptera
- Suborder: Polyphaga
- Infraorder: Cucujiformia
- Family: Chrysomelidae
- Genus: Basilepta
- Species: B. fulvipes

Binomial name
- Basilepta fulvipes (Motschulsky, 1860)

Synonyms
- Nodostoma fulvipes Motschulsky, 1860; Nodostoma aeneipenne Motschulsky, 1860; Nodostoma rufotestaceum Motschulsky, 1860; Nodostoma fulvipes var. picicolle Weise, 1889

= Basilepta fulvipes =

Species of beetles

Basilepta fulvipes is a species of beetle in the leaf beetle family (Chrysomelidae) found in the Russian Far East and East Asia. The scientific name of the species was first published as Nodostoma fulvipes in 1860 by Victor Motschulsky, who described it from specimens collected near the Amur River in the Russian Far East.

== Description ==
B. fulvipes is 3–3.5 millimetres (0.12–0.14 in) in length, and is glabrous (lacking setae) on its back side. It is variable in color, having a reddish or dark reddish pronotum, reddish or metallic-colored elytra, and reddish legs. The pronotum is narrower than the elytra at the base, and the antennae are filiform (thread-like).

B. fulvipes is very similar in appearance to Basilepta cribricollis, which is found in many of the same regions and has historically been misidentified as B. fulvipes. The two species can usually be distinguished from each other by the color of the pronotum (in B. cribricollis it is usually a metallic blue or green, sometimes almost black), but in some cases it is necessary to study the genitalia to tell them apart.

== Distribution ==
B. fulvipes is distributed in the Russian Far East, China, Mongolia, North Korea, South Korea, Japan and Taiwan. Within the Russian Far East, it is recorded from Primorsky Krai, Khabarovsk Krai, Amur Oblast, and Sakhalin Island.

== Host plants ==
B. fulvipes is a highly polyphagous species, feeding on a variety of plants, and is known as a pest of crops such as soybean, maize and bananas.
