= Nzilo Hydroelectric Power Station =

Hydropower station in the Democratic Republic of the Congo

- Map of DR Congo showing the location of Nzilo Hydroelectric Power Station Nzilo Hydroelectric Power Station (Africa) Nzilo Hydroelectric Power Station (Earth)
- Country: Democratic Republic of the Congo
- Location: Nzilo, Lualaba Province
- Coordinates: 10°29′59″S 25°27′45″E
- Purpose: Power
- Status: Operational
- Construction began: 1950s
- Opening date: 1953
- Operator: Société Nationale d'Électricité (SNEL)

Dam and spillways
- Impounds: Congo River

Reservoir
- Creates: Lake Nzilo

Power Station
- Turbines: 4 x 25 MW
- Installed capacity: 100 MW (130,000 hp)

Nzilo Hydroelectric Power Station (French: Centrale hydroélectrique de Nzilo) is an operational hydropower plant in the Democratic Republic of the Congo, with installed capacity of 100 megawatts (130,000 hp). It is operated by the Congolese electricity utility company, Société Nationale d'Électricité (SNEL).

== Location ==
The power station is located on the Congo River, in Lualaba Province, in southeastern DR Congo, close to the border with Zambia. Its location is approximately 30 kilometres (19 mi), north of the city of Kolwezi, the provincial capital. This is approximately 282 kilometres (175 mi), northwest of Lubumbashi, the nearest large city. The geographical coordinates of Nzilo Hydroelectric Power Station are: 10°29'59.0"S, 25°27'45.0"E (Latitude:-10.499722; Longitude:25.462500).

== Overview ==
This power station was constructed in the 1950s and commercially commissioned in 1953. The dam impounds the Congo River to create Lake Nzilo. The power plant comprises four turbines, each with generating capacity of 25 megawatts. The power produced is integrated into the national electric grid, by the national electricity utility, SNEL.

Due to the old age of the hardware, during the 2014 to 2015 time frame, Nzilo Power station underwent rehabilitation to maintain functional efficiency.

== Ownership ==
Nzilo Power Station was constructed in the 1950s and commercially commissioned in 1953 to supply power to Glencore, a Swiss mining conglomerate, which owns mines in Lualaba Province and in the adjacent Haut-Katanga Province. In 1974, SNEL, the electricity generation, transmission and distribution monopoly took over ownership of the power station, following a presidential decree.

== See also ==
- List of power stations in the Democratic Republic of the Congo
- Africa Power Dams
- World Power Dams
