= Pagria maynei =

Scientific classification
- Kingdom: Animalia
- Phylum: Arthropoda
- Clade: Pancrustacea
- Class: Insecta
- Order: Coleoptera
- Suborder: Polyphaga
- Infraorder: Cucujiformia
- Family: Chrysomelidae
- Genus: Pagria
- Species: P. maynei

Binomial name
- Pagria maynei Burgeon, 1941

Species of beetle

Pagria maynei is a species of leaf beetle of the Democratic Republic of the Congo. The species was first described by Belgian entomologist Louis Burgeon in 1941.
