= Lake Upemba =

Lake in southeastern Democratic Republic of Congo

Lake Upemba Lac Upemba Upembameer
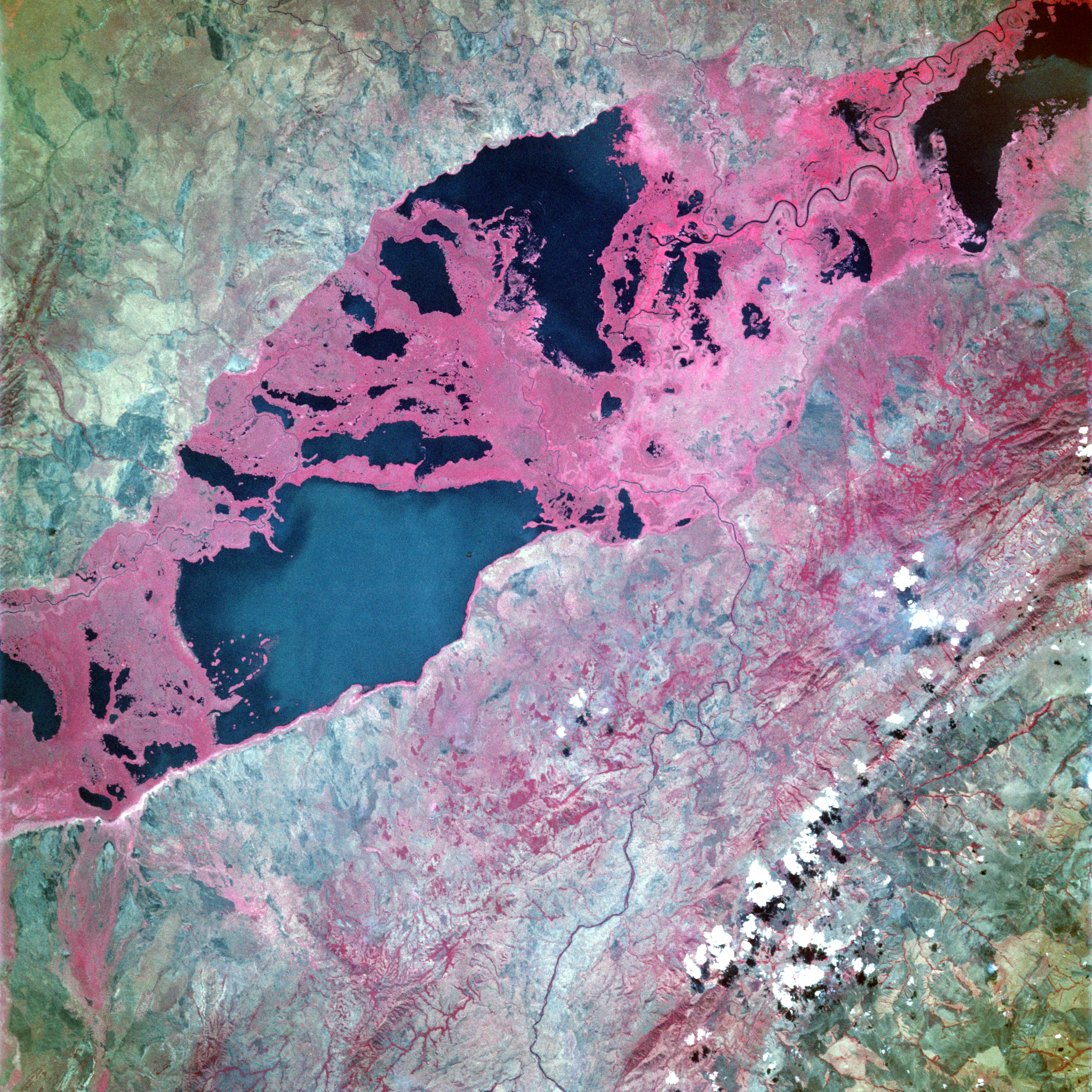

- Location within Democratic Republic of the Congo Location within Africa
- Location: Bukama, Haut-Lomami Province
- Coordinates: 8.6°S 26.44°E
- Basin countries: Democratic Republic of the Congo
- Islands: (floating islands, Mitala Island)

Lake Upemba (French: Lac Upemba; Dutch: Upembameer) is a lake in Bukama, Haut-Lomami Province, the Democratic Republic of the Congo. It, and nearby Lake Kisale, is surrounded by the Upemba Depression in Upemba National Park. The nearest town is Nyonga, and the nearest hospital is located four hours away in Kikondja.

The floating islands in the lake, such Mitala Island, are also the site of an informal refugee settlement that resulted from the fighting between Mai-Mai rebels and government troops since 2006.
