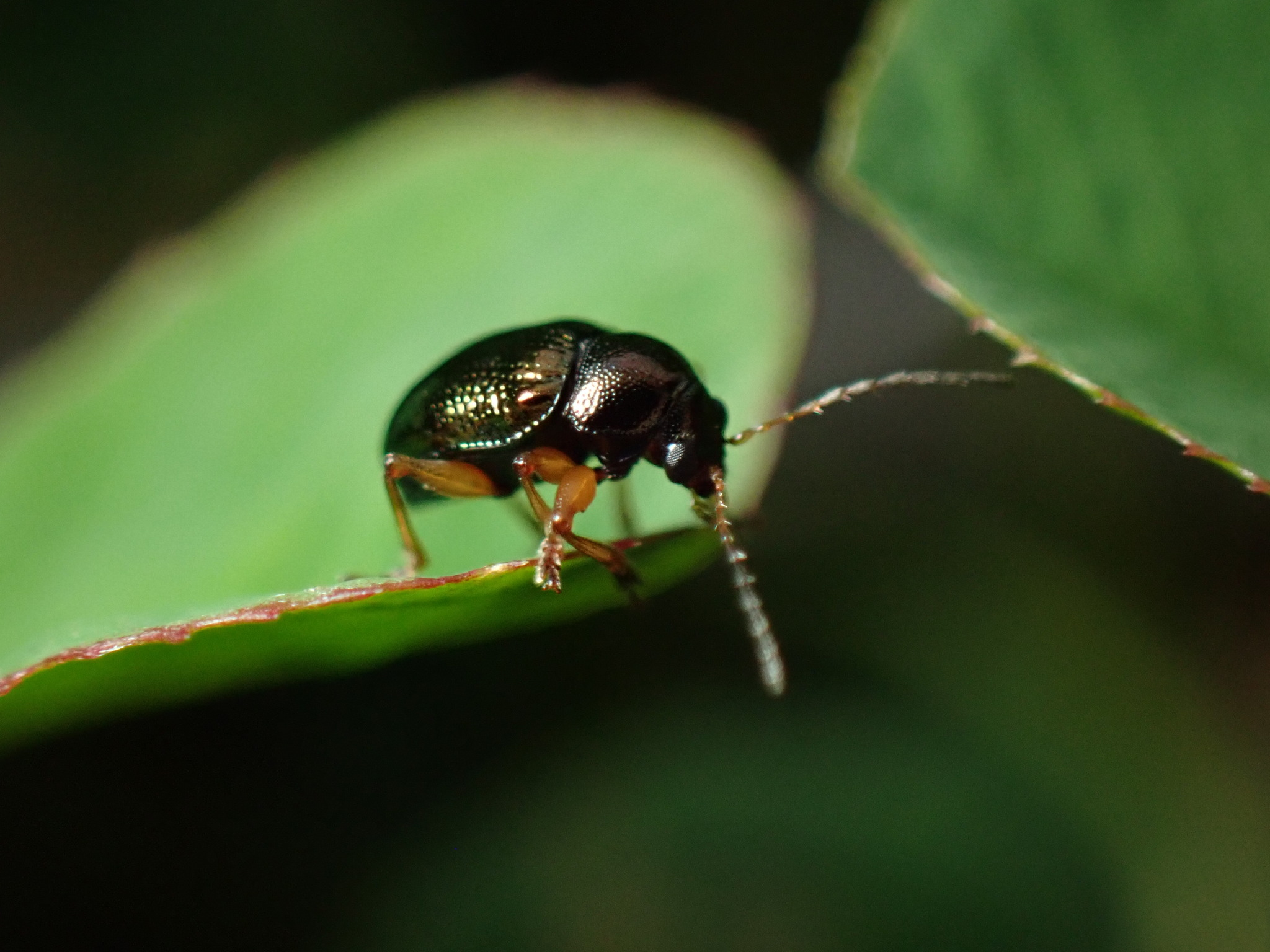
- Basilepta fulvipes, Japan

Scientific classification
- Kingdom: Animalia
- Phylum: Arthropoda
- Clade: Pancrustacea
- Class: Insecta
- Order: Coleoptera
- Suborder: Polyphaga
- Infraorder: Cucujiformia
- Family: Chrysomelidae
- Subfamily: Eumolpinae
- Tribe: Typophorini
- Genus: Basilepta; Baly, 1860

Type species
- Basilepta longipes Baly, 1860

Synonyms
- Nodostoma Motschulsky, 1860; Falsoiphimoides Pic, 1935; Mimoparascela Pic, 1935

= Basilepta =

Genus of leaf beetles

Basilepta is a genus of leaf beetles in the subfamily Eumolpinae. It includes over 300 described species, which are widely distributed in Asia and are most diverse in the tropics. A single species is known from Africa, Basilepta birungana.

Basilepta fulvipes is a pest of crops such as soybean, maize and bananas. Basilepta subcostata is a major pest of bananas and plantains in India, particularly in the northeast.

== Species ==
The following species are placed in the genus:

- Basilepta abdominalis (Jacoby, 1908) – India (Assam), Nepal
- Basilepta acutangula (Jacoby, 1894) – Sumatra
- Basilepta affinis (Baly, 1867) – Aru Islands, New Guinea
- Basilepta aggregata (Jacoby, 1908) – Southern India (Nilgiris)
- Basilepta amboinensis (Baly, 1867) – Ambon
- Basilepta amamiensis Chûjô, 1957 – Ryukyu Islands (Amami Ōshima)
- Basilepta andamanensis (Jacoby, 1908) – Andaman Islands
- Basilepta andrewesi (Jacoby, 1903) – Southern India (Nilgiris)
- Basilepta angulicollis (Duvivier, 1892) – India (Sikkim)
- Basilepta antarala Maulik, 1935 – Sulawesi
- Basilepta anthracina (Baly, 1867) – Singapore
- Basilepta antiqua (Jacoby, 1908) – Southern India (Nilgiris)
- Basilepta apicalis (Baly, 1867) – Borneo (Sarawak)
- Basilepta apicicornis (Lefèvre, 1891) – Sumatra
- Basilepta apicipennis Chen, 1935 – Southern China
- Basilepta armata (Baly, 1867) – Borneo
- Basilepta aruensis (Jacoby, 1884) – Aru Islands
- Basilepta assimilis Weise, 1922 – Philippines
- Basilepta atripennis (Clark, 1865) – Peninsular Malaysia
- Basilepta atripes (Jacoby, 1896) – Sumatra
- Basilepta aureocuprea (Baly, 1867) – Borneo (Sarawak)
- Basilepta bacboensis Eroshkina, 1994 – Vietnam
- Basilepta bakeri Weise, 1922 – Philippines
- Basilepta balyi (Harold, 1877) – Japan, Kuril Islands, Sakhalin
- Basilepta bengalensis (Duvivier, 1891) – Bengal, Myanmar
- Basilepta bicollis Tan, 1988 – Southwestern China (Yunnan)
- Basilepta bicolor (Lefèvre, 1893) – Vietnam
- Basilepta bicolorata Chen, 1940 – Southern China (Guangxi)
- Basilepta bicoloripennis (Pic, 1930) – Vietnam
- Basilepta bicoloripes (Pic, 1935): (homonym of B. bicoloripes (Pic, 1930)) – Vietnam
- Basilepta bidens Tan, 1988 – China (Xizang)
- Basilepta bimaculicollis (Jacoby, 1892) – Myanmar, Sumatra
- Basilepta binghami (Jacoby, 1908) – Southern India (Nilgiris)
- Basilepta binhana (Pic, 1930) – Southern China, India (Sikkim/Darjeeling), Nepal, Vietnam
- Basilepta binominata (Achard, 1914) – Southern India
- Basilepta binotata (Lefèvre, 1886) – Philippines
- Basilepta bipartita (Jacoby, 1896) – Sumatra
- Basilepta bipunctata (Jacoby, 1887) – Sri Lanka
- Basilepta bipustulata (Baly, 1867) – Borneo
- Basilepta birungana Weise, 1924 – East Africa (Virunga lowlands)
- Basilepta bistrigata (Jacoby, 1908) – Sri Lanka
- Basilepta bisulcata Chen, 1976 – China (Xizang)
- Basilepta bituberculata (Jacoby, 1887) – Sri Lanka
- Basilepta bohemani (Baly, 1864) – Borneo
- Basilepta borodinensis Kimoto, 1979 – Ryukyu Islands
- Basilepta brevicollis (Jacoby, 1884) – Sumatra
- Basilepta brunnea (Jacoby, 1896) – Myanmar
- Basilepta buonloica Eroshkina, 1994 – Vietnam
- Basilepta cardoni (Jacoby, 1900) – Bengal
- Basilepta castanea (Baly, 1867) – Sulawesi
- Basilepta chalcea (Jacoby, 1908) – India (Assam), Southwestern China (Yunnan)
- Basilepta chapaensis (Pic, 1930) – Vietnam
- Basilepta chapuisi (Jacoby, 1896) – Sumatra
- Basilepta chiangmaiensis Kimoto & Gressitt, 1982 – Thailand, Laos, Vietnam
- Basilepta clypeata (Jacoby, 1887) – Sri Lanka
- Basilepta concinnicollis (Baly, 1878) – Pakistan (Jhelum Valley), Bengal
- Basilepta concolor (Motschulsky, 1866) – Java
- Basilepta confusa (Clavareau, 1914) – Southern India
- Basilepta congregata (Jacoby, 1908) – India, Thailand, Laos, Vietnam, Southern China (Hainan)
- Basilepta consobrina Chen, 1940 – Southern China (Fujian, Guangxi)
- Basilepta convexa Tan, 1988 – China (Xizang)
- Basilepta convexicollis (Jacoby, 1908) – India (Assam)
- Basilepta cornutua Chûjô, 1956 – Taiwan
- Basilepta costata (Baly, 1864) – Borneo (Sarawak)
- Basilepta crassipes Chen, 1976 – China (Xizang)
- Basilepta cribricollis (Motschulsky, 1860) – China, Taiwan, Japan, North Korea, South Korea, Russian Far East
- Basilepta cribricollis (Jacoby, 1908) (homonym of above) – Southern India (Nilgiris)
- Basilepta cribrithorax Chen, 1940 – China (Sichuan, Chongqing, Gansu)
- Basilepta cumingi (Baly, 1864) – Philippines (Luzon)
- Basilepta cupreata (Baly, 1867) – Borneo (Sarawak)
- Basilepta cupripennis (Baly, 1867) – Borneo (Sarawak)
- Basilepta cyanea (Lefèvre, 1891) – India (Sikkim)
- Basilepta cylindrica (Baly, 1864) – Borneo (Sarawak)
- Basilepta cyrtopus (Lefèvre, 1885) – Philippines (Luzon)
- Basilepta davidi (Lefèvre, 1877) – China, Taiwan, Ryukyu Islands, South Korea
- Basilepta declivis Tan, 1988 – Southwestern China (Sichuan)
- Basilepta dembickyi Medvedev, 2005 – Northeast India (Meghalaya)
- Basilepta denticollis (Jacoby, 1892) – Bengal, Myanmar
- Basilepta deqenensis Tan, 1988 – Southwestern China (Yunnan)
- Basilepta dharwarensis (Jacoby, 1908) – Southern India
- Basilepta dhunchena Kimoto & Takizawa, 1981 – Nepal
- Basilepta dilaticornis (Jacoby, 1884) – Sumatra
- Basilepta dimidiaticornis (Jacoby, 1896) – Mentawai Islands
- Basilepta dimidiatipes (Jacoby, 1908) – Southern India (Nilgiris)
- Basilepta discicollis (Jacoby, 1895) – Southern India
- Basilepta diversipes (Baly, 1867) – Misool
- Basilepta djoui Gressitt & Kimoto, 1961 – Southern China
- Basilepta dohrni (Jacoby, 1899) – Sumatra
- Basilepta dormeri (Baly, 1877) – Southern India
- Basilepta dubiosa (Jacoby, 1908) – Myanmar
- Basilepta duvivieri (Jacoby, 1908) – Myanmar
- Basilepta eakaoensis Eroshkina, 1994 – Vietnam
- Basilepta elegans Chûjô, 1956 – Taiwan
- Basilepta elegantula (Baly, 1867) – Sulawesi
- Basilepta elongata Tan, 1988 – Southwestern China (Yunnan)
- Basilepta eroshkinae Medvedev, 2009 – Vietnam
- Basilepta evanescens (Baly, 1867) – New Guinea
- Basilepta fabrei (Lefèvre, 1887) India (Sikkim/Darjeeling), Nepal, Pakistan, Myanmar, Vietnam
- Basilepta fairmairei (Jacoby, 1887) – Sri Lanka
- Basilepta feae (Jacoby, 1892) – Myanmar
- Basilepta fedorenkoi Medvedev, 2012
- Basilepta femorata (Jacoby, 1908) – India (Sikkim, Assam)
- Basilepta flavescens (Motschulsky, 1866) – Bali, Thailand, Laos, Vietnam, Java
- Basilepta flavicaudis Tan, 1988 – Southwestern China (Yunnan)
- Basilepta flavolimbata (Jacoby, 1908) – Southern India (Nilgiris), Myanmar
- Basilepta forticornis Weise, 1922 – Philippines
- Basilepta foveicollis (Baly, 1864) – Sulawesi
- Basilepta fukienensis Gressitt & Kimoto, 1961 – Southern China (Fujian)
- Basilepta fulva (Jacoby, 1908)
- Basilepta fulvescens Eroshkina, 1997 – Vietnam
- Basilepta fulvicornis (Jacoby, 1904) – Southern India (Nilgiris, Anaimalais)
- Basilepta fulvipes (Motschulsky, 1860) – Russian Far East, China, Mongolia, North, Korea South Korea, Japan, Taiwan
- Basilepta fulvofasciata (Jacoby, 1908) – India (Assam)
- Basilepta fulvotibialis (Jacoby, 1908) – Myanmar (Tanintharyi Region)
- Basilepta fuscolimbata Tan, 1988 – Southwestern China (Yunnan)
- Basilepta fyanensis Kimoto & Gressitt, 1982 – Vietnam
- Basilepta gemmata Weise, 1922 – Philippines
- Basilepta geniculata (Lefèvre, 1891) – Bengal, Southern India
- Basilepta gestroi (Jacoby, 1884) – Sumatra
- Basilepta gibbosa (Jacoby, 1890) – China (Hubei)
- Basilepta glabricollis (Jacoby, 1908) – Southern India
- Basilepta gracilipes (Jacoby, 1908) – Myanmar
- Basilepta gracilis Chen, 1935 – North Vietnam
- Basilepta granulosa Tan, 1988 – Southwestern China (Yunnan)
- Basilepta grossa Medvedev, 1995 – Philippines (Bucas Grande)
- Basilepta hampsoni (Jacoby, 1908) – Southern India (Nilgiris)
- Basilepta hattoriae Takizawa, 1983 – Northern India (Uttar Pradesh)
- Basilepta humeralis (Baly, 1867) – Borneo (Sarawak)
- Basilepta hirayamai (Chûjô, 1935) – Japan, Ryukyu Islands, Taiwan, South Korea
- Basilepta hirticollis (Baly, 1874) – Japan
- Basilepta imitans (Jacoby, 1908) – India (Manipur)
- Basilepta impressipennis (Jacoby, 1887) – Sri Lanka
- Basilepta incerta (Pic, 1928) – Vietnam, Southwestern China (Sichuan)
- Basilepta inconspicua (Jacoby, 1908) – India (Assam)
- Basilepta indica (Jacoby, 1892) – India
- Basilepta instabilis (Jacoby, 1908) – Southern India
- Basilepta intacta (Jacoby, 1908) – India (Assam)
- Basilepta interrupta Medvedev, 2010 – North Vietnam
- Basilepta irregularis (Jacoby, 1900) – Myanmar
- Basilepta issikii Chûjô, 1956 – China (Chongqing), Taiwan
- Basilepta jacobyi (Lefèvre, 1884) – Java
- Basilepta jansoni (Baly, 1864) – Singapore
- Basilepta janthina (Lefèvre, 1885) – Philippines
- Basilepta javanensis (Baly, 1867) – Sumatra, Java
- Basilepta jeanvoinei (Pic, 1928) – Vietnam
- Basilepta kandyensis Kimoto, 2003 – Sri Lanka
- Basilepta kaszabi Lopatin, 1962 – Eastern China (Shanghai)
- Basilepta kaulbachi (Bryant, 1939) – China (Xizang)
- Basilepta korhongensis Kimoto & Gressitt, 1982 – Thailand
- Basilepta laeta Medvedev, 1992 – Nepal
- Basilepta laeta Eroshkina, 1994 (homonym of above) – Vietnam
- Basilepta laevicollis (Jacoby, 1884) – Sumatra
- Basilepta laevigata Tan, 1981 – China (Sichuan, Xizang)
- Basilepta laevis (Baly, 1867) – Borneo
- Basilepta lameyi (Lefèvre, 1893) – Vietnam
- Basilepta latefasciata (Jacoby, 1908) – Bengal
- Basilepta latericosta Gressitt & Kimoto, 1961 – China (Xizang)
- Basilepta lateripunctata (Baly, 1867) – Singapore
- Basilepta latipennis (Pic, 1928) – Vietnam
- Basilepta leechi (Jacoby, 1888) – Southern China, Northern Vietnam
- Basilepta lefevrei (Jacoby, 1887) – Sri Lanka
- Basilepta lewisi (Jacoby, 1887) – Sri Lanka
- Basilepta livida Kimoto & Gressitt, 1982 – Thailand
- Basilepta longicornis (Jacoby, 1887) – Sri Lanka
- Basilepta longipennis (Pic, 1931) – Vietnam
- Basilepta longipes Baly, 1860 – Borneo
- Basilepta longitarsalis Tan, 1992 – China (Hunan)
- Basilepta luzonica Weise, 1922 – Philippines
- Basilepta maai Kimoto & Gressitt, 1982 – Thailand
- Basilepta maculiceps (Jacoby, 1908) – Southern India
- Basilepta maculipennis (Jacoby, 1908) – Southern India
- Basilepta magnicollis Tan, 1988 – China (Xizang)
- Basilepta maheensis (Jacoby, 1908) – Southern India (Malabar)
- Basilepta makiharai Kimoto, 2001 – Nepal
- Basilepta malayana Medvedev, 2016 – Peninsular Malaysia
- Basilepta manaliensis Shukla, 1960 – Northern India (Himachal Pradesh)
- Basilepta manii Shukla, 1960 – Northern India (Himachal Pradesh)
- Basilepta marginalis Kimoto & Gressitt, 1982 – Thailand
- Basilepta marginata (Jacoby, 1884) – Java
- Basilepta martini (Lefèvre, 1885) – Laos, Vietnam, Cambodia, Southern China, Taiwan
- Basilepta medvedevi Eroshkina, 1997 – Vietnam
- Basilepta melanopus (Lefèvre, 1893) – Northern Vietnam, Southern China, Taiwan
- Basilepta mindanaica Medvedev, 2009 – Philippines (Mindanao)
- Basilepta mindorensis Medvedev, 1995 – Philippines (Mindoro)
- Basilepta minor (Pic, 1929) – Sumatra
- Basilepta minutipunctata Tan, 1988 – China (Xizang)
- Basilepta minutissima Kimoto & Gressitt, 1982 – Thailand
- Basilepta minuta (Jacoby, 1905) – New Guinea
- Basilepta miyatakei Kimoto & Gressitt, 1982 – Thailand
- Basilepta modesta (Jacoby, 1885) – Japan, Southern China (Fujian), Taiwan
- Basilepta modiglianii (Jacoby, 1896) – Sumatra
- Basilepta momeitensis (Jacoby, 1908) – Myanmar
- Basilepta montana (Jacoby, 1908) – Myanmar
- Basilepta morimotoi Kimoto & Gressitt, 1982 – Thailand
- Basilepta motschulskyi (Lefèvre, 1884) – Borneo
- Basilepta multicolor (Jacoby, 1894) – Borneo
- Basilepta multicostata (Jacoby, 1892) – Sumatra
- Basilepta multimaculata Kimoto & Gressitt, 1982 – Vietnam
- Basilepta musae (Bryant, 1938) – Peninsular Malaysia
- Basilepta napolovi Medvedev, 2015 – Vietnam
- Basilepta nala Takizawa, 1984 – Southern India (Kerala)
- Basilepta nigra (Baly, 1867) – Peninsular Malaysia
- Basilepta nigricollis Medvedev, 2015 – Nepal
- Basilepta nigricornis (Baly, 1864) – Sulawesi
- Basilepta nigripecta Gressitt & Kimoto, 1961 – Southern China (Jiangxi)
- Basilepta nigripes (Baly, 1864) – Sumatra
- Basilepta nigrita (Baly, 1867) – Peninsular Malaysia
- Basilepta nigrita Medvedev, 1997 (homonym of above) – Nepal
- Basilepta nigritarsis (Jacoby, 1884) – Sumatra
- Basilepta nigroaenea (Baly, 1867) – Sulawesi
- Basilepta nigrobimarginata (Jacoby, 1908) – Southern India, Myanmar (Tanintharyi Region)
- Basilepta nigrocincta (Jacoby, 1908) – Myanmar
- Basilepta nigrofasciata (Jacoby, 1889) – Bengal, Myanmar
- Basilepta nigrolineata (Jacoby, 1908) – Southern India
- Basilepta nigromaculata (Lefèvre, 1891) – Sumatra
- Basilepta nigromarginata (Jacoby, 1896) – Bali, Sumatra
- Basilepta nigrosuturata (Jacoby, 1896) – Sumatra
- Basilepta nigroviridis (Jacoby, 1896) – Sumatra
- Basilepta nilgiriensis (Jacoby, 1903) – Southern India (Nilgiris)
- Basilepta nitida (Baly, 1867) – Borneo (Sarawak)
- Basilepta nobilitata (Jacoby, 1895) – Southern India (Kanara)
- Basilepta notabilis Chen, 1935 – Laos or Cambodia
- Basilepta nyalamensis Tan, 1981 – China (Xizang)
- Basilepta oberthuri (Lefèvre, 1877) – Southern China (Fujian, Jiangxi)
- Basilepta obliterata (Jacoby, 1887) – Sri Lanka
- Basilepta oblonga (Motschulsky, 1866) – Sri Lanka
- Basilepta oblongopunctata (Jacoby, 1908) – Southern India (Nilgiris)
- Basilepta obscuromaculata (Jacoby, 1908) – Southern India (Nilgiris)
- Basilepta orientalis (Jacoby, 1890) – China (Hubei, Sichuan)
- Basilepta ornatissima (Jacoby, 1884) – New Guinea
- Basilepta ornata (Jacoby, 1908) – Southern India
- Basilepta ovalis Chen, 1940 – China (Hebei, Sichuan, Zhejiang)
- Basilepta pacholatkoi Medvedev, 2005 – Northeast India (Meghalaya)
- Basilepta palawanica Weise, 1922 – Philippines
- Basilepta pallida (Baly, 1864) – Borneo
- Basilepta pallidicolor (Pic, 1929) – Java
- Basilepta pallidipes (Baly, 1867) – New Guinea
- Basilepta pallidula (Baly, 1874) – China, North Korea, South Korea, Japan
- Basilepta parvula (Jacoby, 1896) – Sumatra
- Basilepta pectoralis (Pic, 1931) – Southwestern China (Yunnan)
- Basilepta philippinensis (Lefèvre, 1885) – Philippines
- Basilepta picea (Baly, 1867) – Borneo
- Basilepta piceipes (Baly, 1867) – New Guinea
- Basilepta piceomaculata (Baly, 1867) – Borneo
- Basilepta pici Eroshkina, 1994 – Vietnam
- Basilepta picimane (Jacoby, 1908) – India
- Basilepta picturata (Motschulsky, 1866) – Sri Lanka
- Basilepta picta (Baly, 1867) – Aru Islands, New Guinea
- Basilepta pinguis Chen, 1940 – Southern China (Hainan)
- Basilepta placida (Baly, 1867) – Borneo
- Basilepta plagiosa (Baly, 1878) – China (Xinjiang), Pakistan (Murree), India (Assam)
- Basilepta plicata (Pic, 1929)
- Basilepta polita Weise, 1926 – Sumatra
- Basilepta pretiosa (Jacoby, 1908) – India (Assam)
- Basilepta proxima (Baly, 1867) – Borneo (Sarawak)
- Basilepta pseudobeccarii Eroshkina, 1997 – Vietnam
- Basilepta pubicollis (Jacoby, 1895) – India
- Basilepta pubiventris Tan, 1988 – Southwestern China (Sichuan)
- Basilepta pulchella (Baly, 1867) – Waigeo
- Basilepta puncticollis (Lefèvre, 1889) – India, Nepal, Myanmar, North Vietnam, Southern China
- Basilepta punctifrons An, 1988 – South Korea
- Basilepta punctostriata Gressitt & Kimoto, 1961 – Southern China (Jiangxi)
- Basilepta purpureofasciata (Jacoby, 1894) – New Guinea
- Basilepta pusilla (Gyllenhal, 1808) – India
- Basilepta quadrifasciata (Jacoby, 1908) – India (Sikkim), Nepal
- Basilepta quadrimaculata (Pic, 1931) – Vietnam
- Basilepta quadrinotata (Lefèvre, 1891) – Java
- Basilepta quercicola Takizawa, 2017 – Borneo (Sabah)
- Basilepta regularis Tan, 1981 – China (Xizang)
- Basilepta remota Tan, 1984 – Southwestern China (Yunnan)
- Basilepta riedeli Medvedev, 2015 – Northern India (Uttarakhand)
- Basilepta rondoni Kimoto & Gressitt, 1982 – Laos
- Basilepta rotundicollis (Jacoby, 1896) – Sumatra
- Basilepta rubimaculata Tan, 1988 – China (Xizang)
- Basilepta ruficollis (Jacoby, 1885) – Japan, China, Taiwan
- Basilepta rugosa (Jacoby, 1884) – Borneo (Sarawak)
- Basilepta scabrosa (Baly, 1864) – Borneo (Sarawak)
- Basilepta schawalleri Medvedev, 1992 – Nepal
- Basilepta scutellaris Chen, 1963 – China (Xizang)
- Basilepta semicaerulea (Jacoby, 1892) – Myanmar
- Basilepta semicostata (Jacoby, 1896) – Sumatra
- Basilepta semiglabrata (Jacoby, 1908) – Myanmar
- Basilepta semilaeva (Jacoby, 1908) – Myanmar
- Basilepta semipurpurea (Jacoby, 1892) – Myanmar
- Basilepta semirufa (Pic, 1930) – Vietnam
- Basilepta semistriata (Jacoby, 1908) – Myanmar
- Basilepta semperi (Lefèvre, 1891) – Philippines
- Basilepta separata (Jacoby, 1908) – India (Assam), Nepal
- Basilepta severa Weise, 1922 – Philippines
- Basilepta sikkimensis (Jacoby, 1900) – India (Sikkim), Nepal
- Basilepta simplex (Jacoby, 1884) – Bali, Java
- Basilepta sinara Weise, 1922 – East China
- Basilepta speciosa (Lefèvre, 1893) – Vietnam
- Basilepta spenceri Kimoto & Gressitt, 1982 – Thailand
- Basilepta splendens (Hope, 1831) – India (Sikkim/Darjeeling), Nepal
- Basilepta splendida Weise, 1922 – Philippines
- Basilepta staudingeri (Jacoby, 1894) – Peninsular Malaysia
- Basilepta stigmosa (Jacoby, 1895) – Java
- Basilepta strigicollis (Baly, 1867) – Sulawesi
- Basilepta subcostata (Jacoby, 1889) – India, Bangladesh, Myanmar, Thailand, Laos, Cambodia, Nepal, Southwestern China (Yunnan)
- Basilepta subdepressa (Jacoby, 1908) – Myanmar
- Basilepta sublaevipennis (Jacoby, 1908) – Myanmar
- Basilepta sublateralis (Clavareau, 1914) – Taiwan
- Basilepta subpunctata (Achard, 1914) – Northern China (Gansu)
- Basilepta subruficollis Tan, 1993 – Southwestern China (Guizhou)
- Basilepta subtuberosa Tan, 1988 – Southwestern China (Yunnan)
- Basilepta sulawesiana Medvedev, 2009 – Sulawesi
- Basilepta sumatrensis (Jacoby, 1884) – Sumatra, Java
- Basilepta suturalis (Motschulsky, 1866) – Sri Lanka
- Basilepta sylhetensis (Jacoby, 1908) – India (Assam)
- Basilepta tavoyensis (Jacoby, 1908) – Myanmar
- Basilepta terminata (Jacoby, 1908) – India (Manipur)
- Basilepta thoracica (Lefèvre, 1886) – Philippines
- Basilepta tibialis (Baly, 1867) – Borneo
- Basilepta triangularis (Motschulsky, 1866) – Sri Lanka
- Basilepta tricarinata Tan, 1988 – Southwestern China (Yunnan)
- Basilepta tricolor (Baly, 1877) – Thailand, Laos, Vietnam
- Basilepta tristis Medvedev, 2015 – Nepal
- Basilepta trivittata (Baly, 1867) – Borneo
- Basilepta tuberculata (Baly, 1867) – Sulawesi
- Basilepta uenoi Nakane, 1958 – Japan
- Basilepta uniformis (Motschulsky, 1866) – Sri Lanka
- Basilepta unipunctata (Jacoby, 1908) – Southern India (Nilgiris)
- Basilepta variabilis (Duvivier, 1892) – India (Sikkim), Bengal, Nepal
- Basilepta varians Chûjô, 1956 – Southern China (Fujian), Taiwan
- Basilepta varicolor (Jacoby, 1885) – Thailand, Vietnam, Southern China, Taiwan, Japan
- Basilepta varipennis (Jacoby, 1896) – Sumatra
- Basilepta violaceofasciata (Jacoby, 1892) – Myanmar
- Basilepta violacea (Jacoby, 1884) – Sulawesi
- Basilepta virendri Shukla, 1960 – Northern India (Himachal Pradesh)
- Basilepta viridiaenea (Baly, 1864) – Sulawesi
- Basilepta viridicyanea Kimoto & Gressitt, 1982 – Vietnam
- Basilepta viridiornata (Baly, 1867) – Halmahera
- Basilepta viridipennis (Motschulsky, 1860) – India, Nepal, Myanmar, Thailand, Laos, Vietnam, China (Hainan, Xizang, Yunnan), Peninsular Malaysia, Sumatra
- Basilepta viridis (Pic, 1935) – Vietnam
- Basilepta viridissima (Jacoby, 1896) – Sumatra
- Basilepta vittipennis (Achard, 1914) – Sumatra
- Basilepta wallacei (Baly, 1867) – Borneo
- Basilepta wallardiensis (Jacoby, 1908) – Southern India
- Basilepta waterhousei (Jacoby, 1908) – India
- Basilepta weigeli Medvedev, 2015 – Sulawesi
- Basilepta weisei (Jacoby, 1900) – Bengal, Southern India, Pakistan
- Basilepta weixiensis Tan, 1988 – Southwestern China (Yunnan)
- Basilepta xanthopus (Harold, 1874) – Philippines, New Guinea
- Basilepta yangsoensis Chen, 1940 – Southern China (Guangxi, Fujian)
- Basilepta yimnae Gressitt & Kimoto, 1961 – Southern China (Guangdong)

Species moved to Parascela:

- Basilepta rugipennis Tan, 1988
- Nodostoma hirsutum Jacoby, 1908
- Nodostoma tuberosum Jacoby, 1887

Species moved to Cleorina:

- Basilepta bella (Jacoby, 1892): synonym of Cleorina aenomicans (Baly, 1867)
- Basilepta bhamoensis (Jacoby, 1892): synonym of Cleorina sculpturata (Motschulsky, 1860)
- Basilepta capitata (Jacoby, 1892): synonym of Cleorina sculpturata (Motschulsky, 1860)
- Basilepta sculpturata (Motschulsky, 1860)

Synonyms:

- Basilepta aenomicans Chûjô, 1956: synonym of Basilepta varicolor (Jacoby, 1885)
- Basilepta anchoralis (Jacoby, 1900): synonym of Basilepta pubicollis (Jacoby, 1895)
- Basilepta beccarii (Jacoby, 1884): synonym of Basilepta flavescens (Motschulsky, 1866)
- Basilepta bicoloripes (Pic, 1930): synonym of Basilepta fulvipes (Motschulsky, 1860)
- Basilepta bicolorata Chûjô, 1956 (preoccupied by Basilepta bicolorata Chen, 1940): synonym of Basilepta varians Chûjô, 1956
- Basilepta chinensis (Lefèvre, 1877): synonym of Basilepta fulvipes (Motschulsky, 1860)
- Basilepta consimilis Chûjô, 1956: synonym of Basilepta varians Chûjô, 1956
- Basilepta cyanipennis (Lefèvre, 1893): synonym of Basilepta subcostata (Jacoby, 1889)
- Basilepta dorunga Aslam, 1968 (replacement name for Basilepta bicolorata Chûjô, 1956): synonym of Basilepta varians Chûjô, 1956
- Basilepta femorata (Jacoby, 1908): synonym of Basilepta splendens (Hope, 1831)
- Basilepta frontalis (Baly, 1867): synonym of Basilepta viridipennis (Motschulsky, 1860)
- Basilepta gigantea Chûjô, 1938: synonym of Basilepta modesta (Jacoby, 1885)
- Basilepta harmandi (Lefèvre, 1893): synonym of Basilepta tricolor (Baly, 1877)
- Basilepta haroldi (Jacoby, 1908): synonym of Basilepta viridipennis (Motschulsky, 1860)
- Basilepta ikomai Chûjô, 1961: synonym of Basilepta nigrofasciata (Jacoby, 1889)
- Basilepta kumatai Kimoto & Takizawa, 1973: synonym of Basilepta binhana (Pic, 1930)
- Basilepta laeviuscula (Weise, 1910): synonym of Basilepta pallidula (Baly, 1874)
- Basilepta limbata (Lefèvre, 1893): synonym of Basilepta puncticollis (Lefèvre, 1889)
- Basilepta nigriventris (Lefèvre, 1893): synonym of Basilepta puncticollis (Lefèvre, 1889)
- Basilepta obscura (Jacoby, 1908): synonym of Basilepta subcostata (Jacoby, 1889)
- Basilepta occipitalis (Jacoby, 1908): synonym of Basilepta viridipennis (Motschulsky, 1860)
- Basilepta sakaii Takizawa, 1987: synonym of Basilepta subcostata (Jacoby, 1889)
- Basilepta taiwana Chûjô, 1956: synonym of Basilepta varians Chûjô, 1956

Renamed species:

- Basilepta bella Eroshkina, 1997: renamed to Basilepta eroshkinae Medvedev, 2009
- Basilepta lateralis (Matsumura, 1911) (preoccupied): renamed to Basilepta sublateralis (Clavareau, 1914)
- Basilepta lateripunctata (Jacoby, 1896) (preoccupied by Basilepta lateripunctata (Baly, 1867)): renamed to Basilepta vittipennis (Achard, 1914)
- Basilepta orientalis (Jacoby, 1908) (preoccupied by Basilepta orientalis (Jacoby, 1890)): renamed to Basilepta confusa (Clavareau, 1914)
- Basilepta pallidicornis Medvedev, 1995: renamed to Basilepta mindanaica Medvedev, 2009
- Basilepta puncticollis (Weise, 1889) (preoccupied by Basilepta puncticollis (Lefèvre, 1889)): renamed to Basilepta subpunctata (Achard, 1914)
- Basilepta thoracica (Jacoby, 1908) (preoccupied by Basilepta thoracica (Lefèvre, 1886)): renamed to Basilepta binominata (Achard, 1914)
