= Kisalian Graves =

Ancient burial sites

Map of the Upemba Depression

The Kisalian Graves are a series of burial sites located in the Northern part of the Upemba Depression, Democratic Republic of the Congo. They are a part of a larger collection of archaeological sites all dating back to the Iron Age of the region.

Ceramic materials and radiocarbon dating of the graves allow archaeologists to form a chrono-cultural sequence, further dividing the region's Iron Age into distinct phases. The Kisalian Graves date from the Early Kisalian phase (700 - 900 CE) to the Classic Kisalian phase (900 - 1200 CE). Nearly 200 Kisalian graves have been found in the following five cemeteries: Sanga, Katongo, Kamilamba, Kikulu, and Malemba-Nkulu. The grave goods found in the burial sites strongly suggest long-distance trade, metallurgy, social hierarchy, and symbolism within the Kisalian phases. Many of the practices of the Luba people, who currently reside in the Upemba Depression, can be traced back to the Kisalian phases.

== Grave goods ==
Archaeologists' understanding of the Kisalian phases stems predominately from the grave goods at these sites. Common grave goods included ceramic, iron, copper, bone, and ivory. Long curved blades characterized the Kisalian period and likely displayed the wealth or status of an individual. Many Kisalian graves contained copper goods, in the form of personal adornments, despite the rarity of copper ore in the Upemba region. The presence of copper strongly suggests the presence of long-distance trade systems. It is believed that the number of copper goods in a grave corresponded with the status of the individual. During the Classic Kisalian phase, the material culture flourished with evidence of skilled artisans. The Kisalian period was also marked by significant religious and artistic expression, as evidenced by the elaborate funerary practices and the development of sophisticated artistic traditions, such as the production of pottery, sculpture, and other decorative objects. Grave goods from this phase include pottery, ivory, copper, cowrie, and carved bone dolls. The frequency of goods varied between sites, with women and children being among the wealthiest.

== Significance ==
=== Trade ===
The Kisalian Graves contain evidence of trade with the Copperbelt and the East African coast. Despite the high demand for copper, the frequency of such luxury did not increase until the Classic Kisalian phase. The Classic Kisalian phase saw an increase in trade with the Copperbelt, thus ending the geographical isolation of the Upemba Depression. Imported from the East African coast and the Indian Ocean, cowrie shells held great value to the Kisalian. The Kisalian used cowrie shells as a form of currency and decoration.

=== Sociopolitical complexity ===
Population increase led to more complex societies with elaborate social and political structures. The first instance of political complexity occurred during the Early Kisalian phase, indicated by an anvil and ceremonial axe found in one of the burial sites. The contents and location of the graves indicate that they were reserved for individuals of high social status, providing insight into the complex social hierarchy of these cultures. Linguistic and archaeological data allude to the Kisalian Graves as potentially the first archaeological evidence of slavery in Central Africa.

=== Population ===
The Kisalian phase saw a rapid increase in population growth, as shown by the significant number of burial sites. As a result of increased trade and political organization, the population flourished. The increase in population density is evident in the areas surrounding the Upemba Depression to this day. Analysis of the remains found in the Kisalian Graves suggests that the population of the time was relatively young, with a significant proportion of individuals under 30. The graves also contain a roughly equal number of male and female individuals.

== Bibliography ==
- de Maret, Pierre (1999). “The power of symbols and the symbols of power through time: probing the Luban Past.” Beyond Chiefdoms: Pathways to Complexity in Africa
- Pierre de Maret, and Isabelle Sidéra (2015). “Poupées Sur Métapode de Ruminant.” Afrique: Archéologie & Arts 11
- de Maret, Pierre (2016). “Tea Party Toys? Classical Kisalian Grave Goods from the Upemba (D.R. Congo).” Journal of African archaeology 14.1
- Garenne-Marot, Laurence (2019). “Typologie Du Mobilier Métallique Fondée Sur Les Techniques de Mise En Forme.” Afrique: Archéologie & Arts 15
- de Almeida, Marcos Leitão (2020). “Slave Sacrifices in the Upemba Depression? Reinterpreting Classic Kisalian Graves in the Light of New Linguistic Evidence.” Azania 55.4
