= Lake Ambale =

Lake in the Democratic Republic of the Congo

- Lac Ambale (French)
- Location within Democratic Republic of the Congo Location within Africa
- Interactive map of Lake Ambale
- Location: Democratic Republic of the Congo
- Coordinates: 3°58′N 18°49′E
- Type: lake
- Surface elevation: 365 metres (1,198 ft)

Lake Ambale or Lac Ambale is a lake situated in the Democratic Republic of the Congo. It is estimated to lie 365 metres (1,198 ft) above sea level. The lake is near Kotomanga, Awele, and Wuluwu Deuxième.
