= Lake Dikolongo =

Congolese lake

Lake Dikilongo
- Lac Dikilongo (French)
- Location within Democratic Republic of the Congo
- Location: Democratic Republic of the Congo
- Coordinates: 9°58′2.7″S 25°54′18.9″E
- Primary inflows: Lubudi River
- Surface elevation: 1,298 m (4,259 ft)

Lake Dikolongo or Lac Dikilongo is a lake situated in the Democratic Republic of the Congo. It is estimated to lie 1,298 metres (4,259 ft) above sea level. It is fed by the Lubudi River. The lake is near Mulumbu, Mukwemba, and Samuzala.
