= Kibara Mountains =

- Location within Democratic Republic of the Congo

Highest point
- Elevation: 1,850 m (6,070 ft)
- Coordinates: 9°02′28″S 26°39′08″E

Geography
- Country: Democratic Republic of the Congo
- Region: Katanga

Geology
- Orogeny: Kibaran orogeny
- Rock age: Cenozoic

The Kibara Mountains (French: Monts Kibara) are a range in the southeastern part of the Democratic Republic of the Congo. They are partly within the Upemba National Park.

The Kibara mountains were once part of a continuous plateau in northern Katanga that also included the Mitumba and Kundelungu blocks, and has now been divided by deep valleys. The Upemba depression lies to the west of the Kibara mountains. The Lufira River separates them from the Mitumba Mountains to the east. The Kibara mountains have an average elevation of 1,750 metres (5,740 ft) above sea level and a highest elevation of 1,889 metres (6,198 ft). Above 1,500 metres (4,900 ft) the soil is generally poor, sandy and partly lateritized, and becomes very dry in the dry season. Vegetation is low grassland or steppe. There are few trees or bushes.

The mountains have a NE-SW trend, and are folded and intruded. They have been strongly uplifted. The fragmented surface from the end of the Cretaceous at Lumbele occurs at an elevation of 1,890 metres (6,200 ft), above the Mid-Cenozoic pediplain at Mkana at an elevation of 1,800 metres (5,900 ft). The mountains give their name to the Kibaran orogeny. In 1931 Robert studied the mountains and introduced the terms "Complexe des Kibara" and "Système des Kibara" to describe his theory of their origins, a mountain-building process that followed a geosyncline episode.
