= Lake Libanda =

Lake in the Democratic Republic of the Congo

- Lac Libanda (French)
- Location within Democratic Republic of the Congo Location within Africa
- Location: Makanza, Equateur, Democratic Republic of the Congo
- Coordinates: 1.55°N 18.82°E

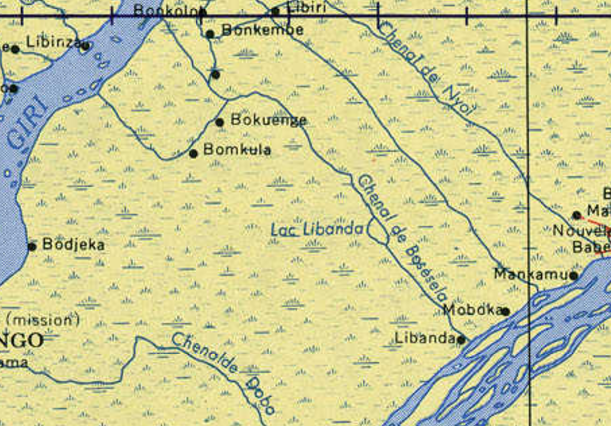
Map of Lake Libanda and the Bosesera Channel. The Ngiri River ("GIRI") is to the northwest, and the Congo River is to the southeast.

Lake Libanda is a lake in the Democratic Republic of the Congo situated in Équateur Province to the west of the town of Makanza. The closest settlement is the village of Moboka to the southeast.

== History ==
The lake was visited in 1889 during the Congo Free State by Captain-Commander of the Force Publique (the Belgian colonial military unit in the Congo) Étienne-Christophe-Bernard-Eugène Wilverth, at the time as Commanding Officer of the training camp of Umangi in the town of Lisala. Making a trip to the Ngiri River, he found that a so-called Lake Ibinza did not exist and instead discovered a channel from the village of Moboka to Lake Libanda and from there to the Ngiri, near the village of Bosesera. This channel was named the Bosesera Channel.

A Christian mission named the Catholic Mission of Libanda operated in the region in the 1960s.

== Geography ==
The lake's surface area is 7.9 km^{2} (3.1 sq mi). Its maximum length is 4.5 km (2.8 mi) and its maximum width is 2.5 km (1.6 mi).

The Bosesera Channel (French: Chenal de Bosesera) is a stream which has its source in Lake Libanda, passing through Mabale before reaching the Congo River near Moboka, slightly downstream of Makanza.

== Demographics ==
The Libanda subgroup of the Libinza people (Libinja) inhabit the region surrounding Lake Libanda. They speak the Libinza language. The other subgroup is the Boyokoko.
