= Upemba Depression =

Marshy depression in the Democratic Republic of the Congo

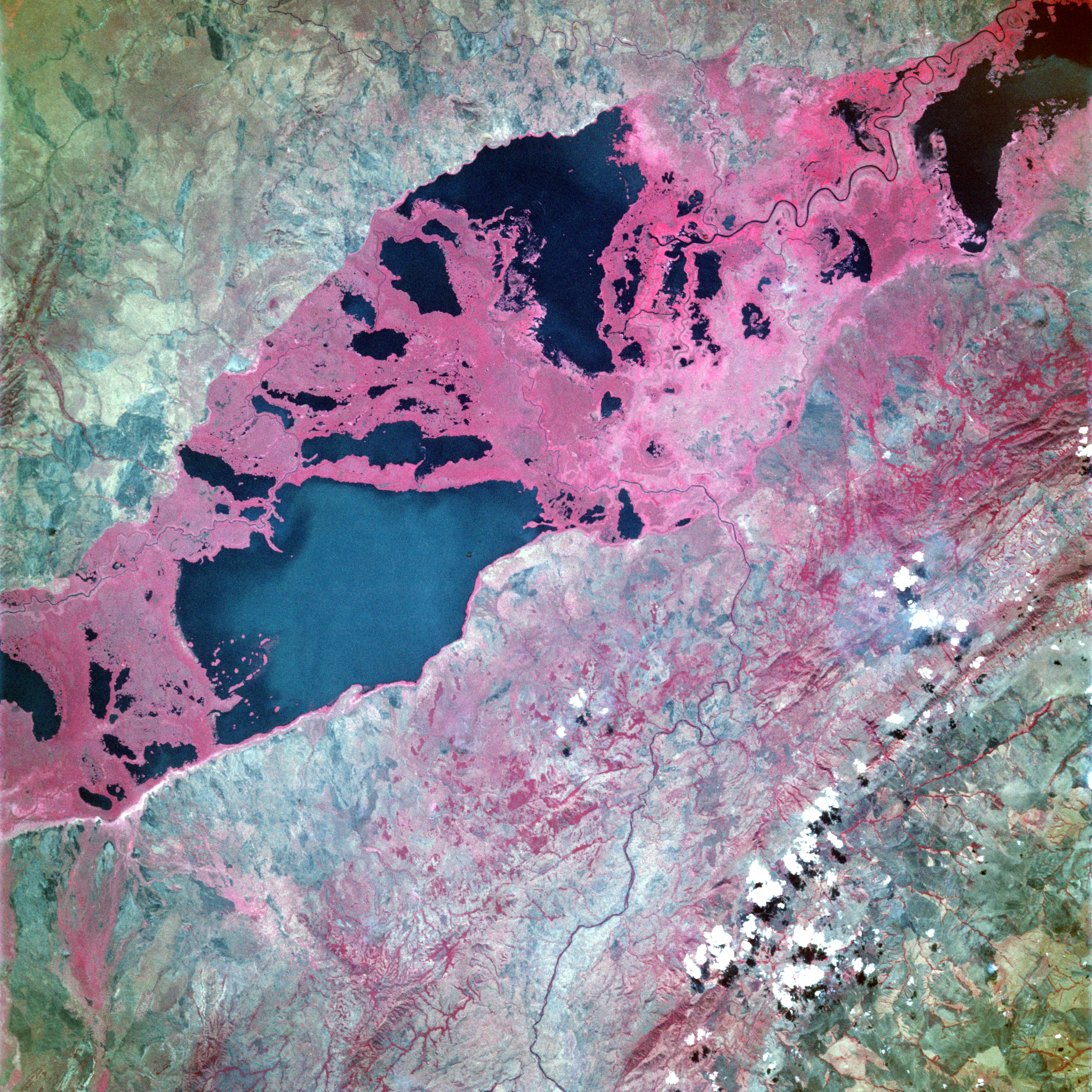

- Location within Democratic Republic of the Congo
- Coordinates: 8.6°S 26.4°E
- Primary inflows: Lualaba, Lufira River, Sanga
- Primary outflows: Lualaba
- Basin countries: Democratic Republic of the Congo
- Max. length: 250 km (160 mi)
- Max. width: 40 km (25 mi)
- Surface area: 6,256 km^{2} (2,415 sq mi)
- Surface elevation: 575 m (1,886 ft)

The Upemba Depression (or Kamalondo Depression) is a large marshy bowl area (depression) in the Democratic Republic of the Congo comprising some fifty lakes, including 22 of relatively large size including Lake Upemba (530 km^{2}) and Lake Kisale (300 km^{2}). In an earlier era, the area was probably occupied by one large lake.

The area is covered in marshland and is partially within the Upemba National Park in Haut-Lomami District. The Upemba Depression has been populated almost continuously since the 5th century AD, and is considered the origin of the Kingdom of Luba (1585-1889). Chronology based on more than 55 radiocarbon datings and thermoluminescence shows periods of occupation since the Stone Age. The area includes many archaeological sites, such as the Kisalian Graves, and is on the tentative list for UNESCO World Heritage Site. Roughly translated, the citation for its inclusion as World Heritage Site states:

This large depression has delivered the largest known cemetery in sub-Saharan Africa. Over 40 archaeological sites have been identified, but only six have been partially excavated so far. Their study allows tracing the complete sequence of the occupation of the region over two millennia, and thus reconstructing the history of a major ethnic group of Central Africa: the Luba.

== Major lakes ==
- Lake Kabamba
- Lake Kabele
- Lake Kabwe
- Lake Kange
- Lake Kibala
- Lake Kisale
- Lake Kalondo
- Lake Kapondwe
- Lake Kasala
- Lake Kayumba
- Lake Kiubo
- Lake Lukonga
- Lake Lunde
- Lake Mulenda
- Lake Muyumbwe
- Lake Noala
- Lake Sanwa
- Lake Songwe
- Lake Tungwe
- Lake Upemba
- Lake Zimbambo
