= Lake Nzilo =

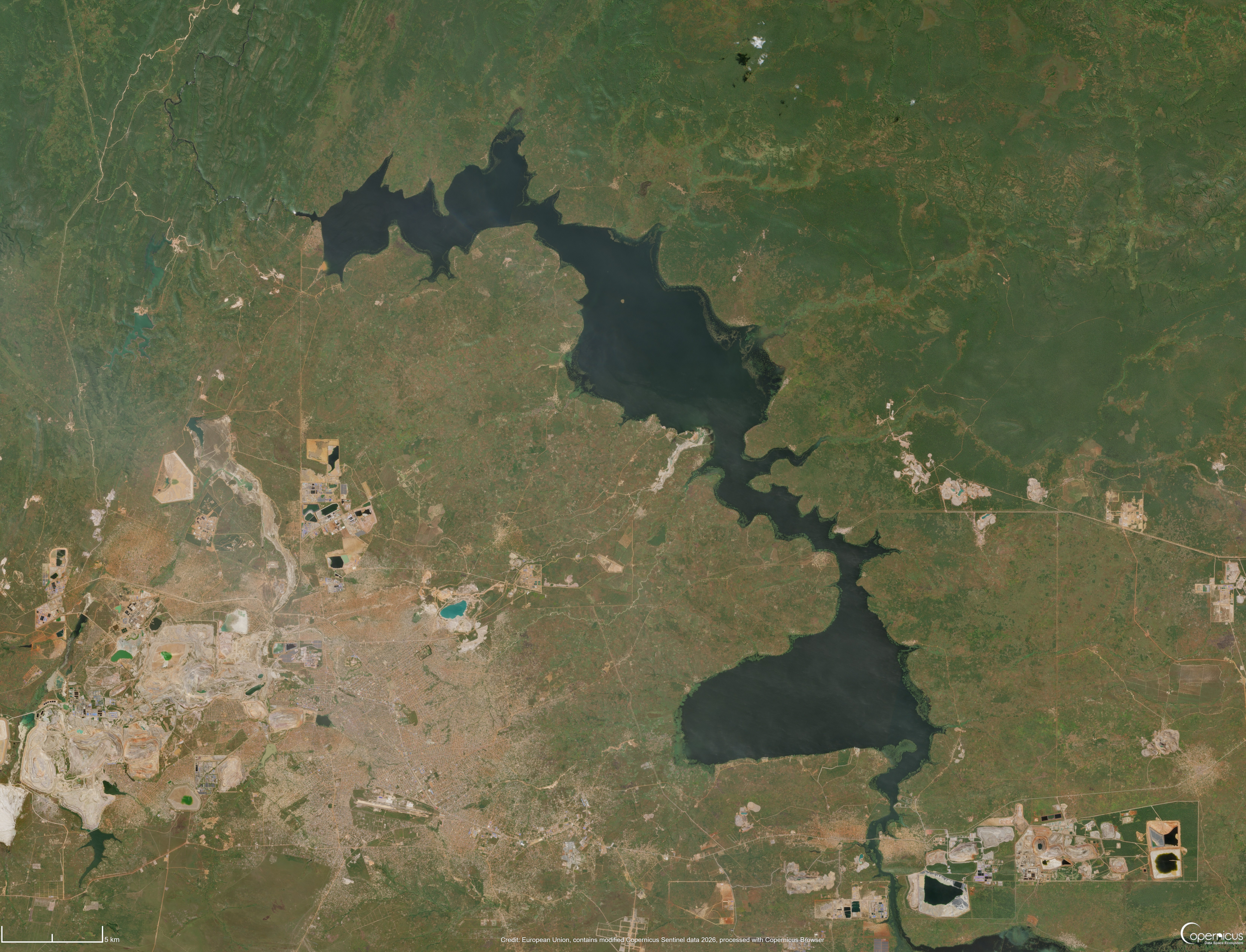
- Lake Delcommune, now called Lake Nzilo, as of May 2026

- Location within Democratic Republic of the Congo Location within Africa
- Location: Haut-Lomami Province
- Coordinates: 10°33′35″S 25°37′41″E
- Type: Reservoir
- Catchment area: Lualaba River
- Basin countries: Democratic Republic of the Congo
- Surface area: 200 km^{2} (77 sq mi)
- Surface elevation: 1,200 metres (3,900 ft)

Lake Nzilo (formerly Lake Delcommune, also Lac del Commune) is a reservoir formed by a hydroelectric dam on the Lualaba River in the Haut-Lomami Province of the southern Democratic Republic of the Congo.

It is about 10 miles (16 km) northeast of the major copper mining area of Kolwezi.

The reservoir was originally named after the Belgian soldier and explorer Alexandre Delcommune.

== Dam ==
The dam with hydroelectric power plant was built to provide power for copper mining operations.

The infrastructure of this plant is four units and has a design capacity of 100MW. The last unit was commissioned in 1953. It is currently operated by SNEL (Societe Nationale d'Electricite).

== Reservoir ==
The reservoir also provides a source of water for these operations.

The site was an area of wetlands along the Lualaba River before it was dammed. Some of the habitat around the lake is swamps.

It has been stocked with fish, and is now an important site for waterbirds.

=== Pollution and recreation ===
Although the lake is visibly polluted by the effluent from a copper mine, schistosomiasis seems to thrive and a number of infections have been reported.

As of 2007 the lake was popular with the expatriate community for weekend water sports.
