= Upemba National Park =

National park in southeastern Democratic Republic of Congo

Upemba National Park Parc national d'Upemba
- IUCN category II (national park)
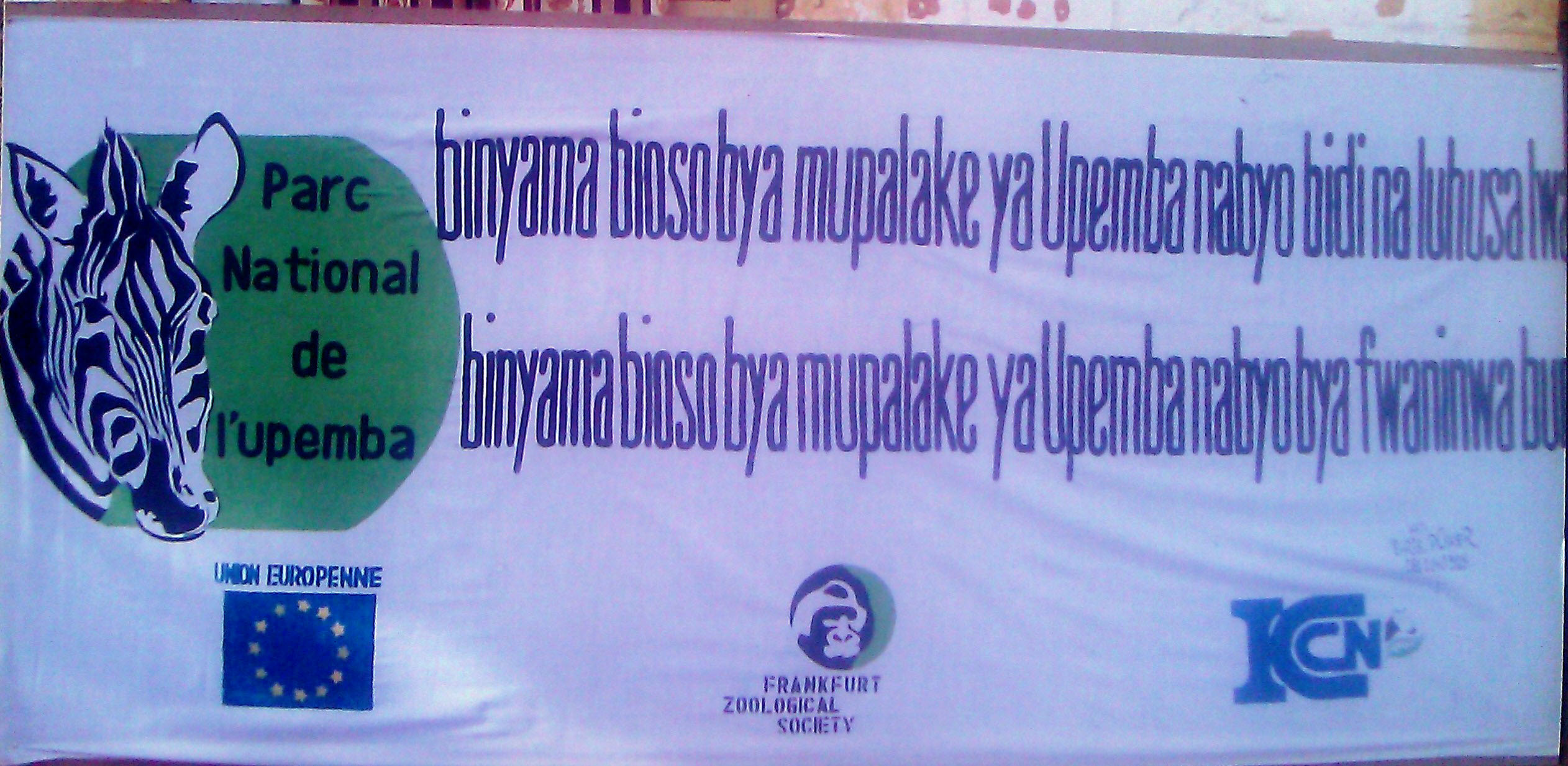

- Location within Democratic Republic of the Congo
- Location: Haut-Lomami, Lualaba Province, Haut-Katanga Province; Democratic Republic of the Congo
- Coordinates: 9°1′S 26°35′E
- Area: 11,730 km^{2} (4,530 sq mi)
- Established: 1939
- Governing body: Institut Congolais pour la Conservation de la Nature

Upemba National Park (French: Parc national d'Upemba) is a large national park in Haut-Lomami, Lualaba Province & Haut-Katanga Province (formerly in Katanga Province) of the southeastern Democratic Republic of Congo, formerly Zaire.

== Geography ==
At the time of the creation of Upemba National Park, on 15 May 1939, the park had a surface area of 17,730 square kilometres (6,850 sq mi). It was the largest park in Africa. In July 1975, the limits were revised and today the integral park has an area of 10,000 square kilometres (3,900 sq mi) with an annex of a further 3,000 square kilometres (1,200 sq mi).

Its lower section is located in the Upemba Depression, a lush area of lakes and marshes including the eponymous Lake Upemba, and bordered by the Lualaba River. Its higher section is in the dryer Kibara Plateau mountains.

== History ==
Upemba National Park was first established in 1939. As with much of the wildlife of the region, in contemporary times the park continues to be threatened by the activities of poachers, pollution, and the activities of refugees and militia.

There are also a handful of villages in the park. In recent years, the park has come under considerable attack from poachers and local militias. On 28 May 2004, for instance, the park headquarters in Lusinga came under attack by the Mai Mai militia. Several wardens and their families were killed, the headquarters were burned down, and the family of the chief warden was taken hostage.

The Frankfurt Zoological Society (FZS), who had been involved with the park, decided that they did not want to be involved anymore. Robert Muir who was a program director with FZS created an NGO called Forgotten Parks. This NGO signed a fifteen year deal in 2017 to partner with the government agency to Upemba.

In January 2023, the Armed Forces of the Democratic Republic of the Congo launched an operation against Mai Mai Kata Katanga rebels who were hiding in the Kundelungu and Upemba National Parks.

In 2024 they had their worst year, to date, when two rangers and two community trackers were killed. Christine Lain leads the partnership between Forgotten Parks and the government to run the park. She blames illegal groups who do not want the park's managers to get too friendly with the local community.

In 2026 there was a raid on the rangers at Lusinga. About twelve of the 256 employed rangers were having a meeting on the morning of 3 March 2026 and they were surrounded by about 80 armed fighters. Seven people were killed. Foreigners were sparred as the fighters plundered the site as they searched for those on their kill list. The vet, Dr Ruth Osodu, was killed because the fighters thought she was from the same heritage as the President. She wasn't.

== Habitat ==
The habitat of the park varies from Afromontane grasslands and forests at higher altitudes in the Kibara Mountains; through Miombo woodlands and tropical rainforests; to marshes, wetlands, lakes, and streams with riparian zones at the lower altitudes. It is home to some 1,800 different species, some of them discovered as late as 2003.

Lake Upemba has a maximum depth reported to be only 3.2 metres (10 ft) and it is a site of intense algae growth. The watercourses of the region fluctuate according to the season and the water level in the lakes is high from March to June, and low from October to January. Many of the bodies of the water in the area are characterized by extensive swamps, with papyrus, Nile lettuce and water caltrop among other species.

=== Fauna ===
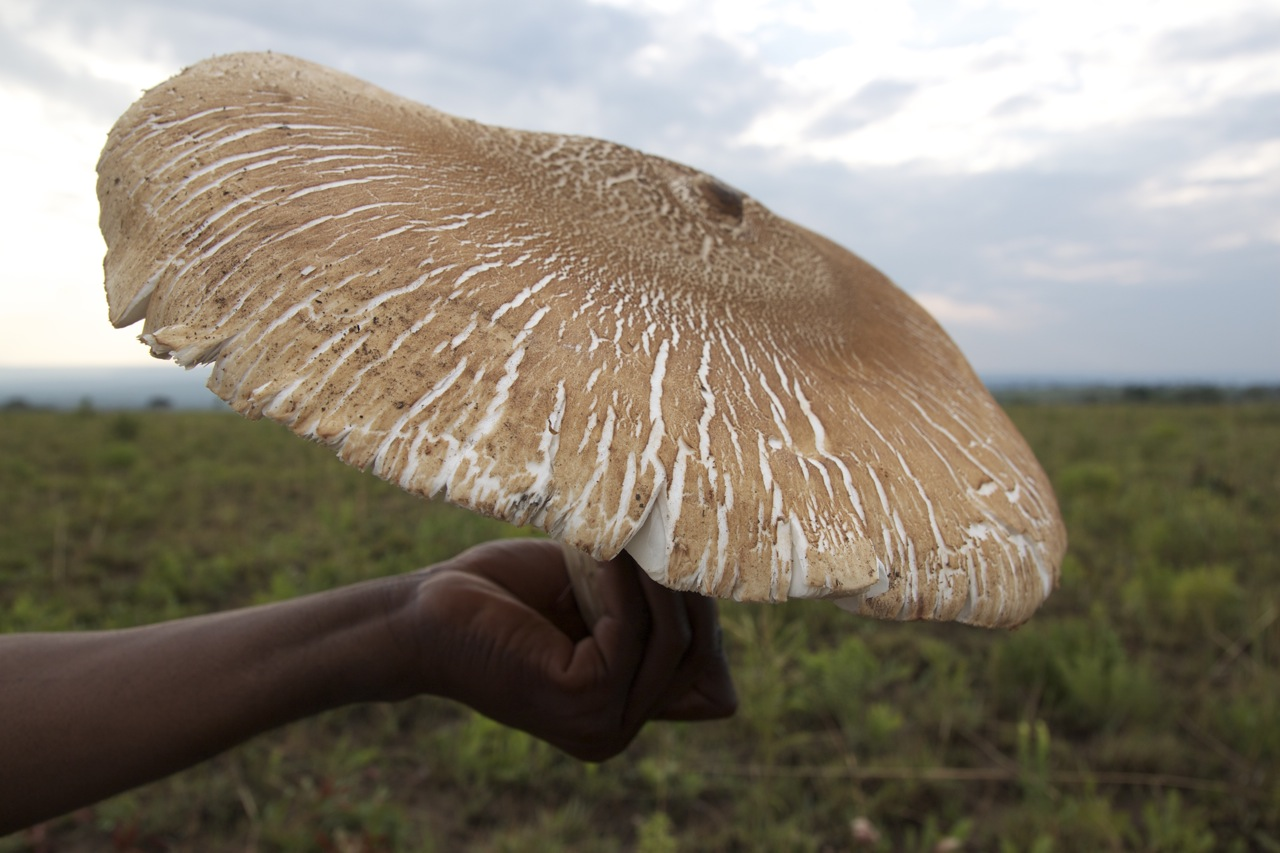
An example of the local fauna

The country's last herd of zebras roams the park as do the last elephants in the southern part of the DRC.

The system of lakes, rivers, swamps and wetlands supports a variety of fish fauna. This includes over 30 species of Cyprinidae, Mormyridae (also known as freshwater elephant fish), Barbus, Alestidae, Mochokidae and Cichlidae.

Bird species include several threatened or endangered species, such as the shoebill, wattled crane and spotted ground-thrush.

Schmidt's snouted frog is only known from the park.

== See also ==
- Congo Rainforest
- National parks of the Democratic Republic of the Congo
- List of national parks in Africa
