= List of rivers of the Democratic Republic of the Congo =

This is a list of rivers in the Democratic Republic of the Congo. This list is arranged by drainage basin, with respective tributaries indented under each larger stream's name.

== Atlantic Ocean ==
A map of the principal rivers and lakes of the Democratic Republic of Congo.

- Chiloango River
- Congo River
  - M'pozo River
  - Inkisi River (Zadi River)
  - Ndjili River
    - Lukaya River
  - Lukunga River
  - Kasai River (Kwa River)
    - Fimi River
      - Lukenie River
      - Lokoro River
      - Lotoi River
    - Kwango River
      - Kwilu River
        - Inzia River
        - Kwenge River
        - Lutshima River
      - Wamba River
        - Bakali River
    - Kamtsha River
    - Luele River
    - Lubue River
    - Loange River
      - Lushiko River
    - Sankuru River
      - Lubudi River
      - Lubefu River
      - Lubi River
        - Fwa River
      - Mbuji-Mayi River (Bushimaie River)
      - Luilu River
      - Lubilash River
      - Luenbe River
    - Lutshuadi River
    - Lulua River
      - Loebo River
    - Lovua River
    - Chicapa River
    - Luachimo River
    - Chiumbe River
      - Luia River
    - Lueta River (Kaongeshi River)
  - Ubangi River
    - Ngiri River
    - Lua River
    - Mbomou River
      - Bili River
    - Uele River
      - Bima River
      - Uere River
      - Bomokandi River
      - Duru River
      - Dungu River
        - Garamba River
      - Kibali River
        - Nzoro River
  - Ruki River
    - Momboyo River
      - Lokolo River
      - Luilaka River
      - Loile River
    - Busira River
      - Salonga River
        - Yenge River
      - Lomela River
        - Tshuapa River
  - Ikelemba River
  - Lulonga River
    - Lopori River
      - Bolombo River
    - Maringa River
      - Lomako River
  - Mongala River
    - Ebola River
  - Itimbiri River
    - Tele River
    - Likati River
    - Rubi River
  - Aruwimi River
    - Lulu River
    - Nepoko River
    - Ituri River
      - Lenda River
  - Lomami River
  - Lindi River
    - Tshopo River
  - Maiko River
  - Lualaba River (upper Congo River)
    - Lowa River
      - Oso River
    - Ulindi River
      - Lugulu River
    - Elila River
    - Luama River
    - Lukuga River
      - Luizi River
      - Lake Tanganyika
        - Ruzizi River
        - Mulobozi River
    - Luvidjo River
    - Luvua River
      - Lukushi River
      - Luapula River
    - Lufira River
    - Lubudi River

== Mediterranean Sea ==
- Nile
  - White Nile
    - Lake Albert
      - Semliki River
        - Rutshuru River
        - Ishasha River (via Lake Edward)
