= Congo River =

River in Central Africa

Congo River Fleuve Congo Rio Congo Mto Kongo Zaire River Fleuve Zaïre Rio Zaire
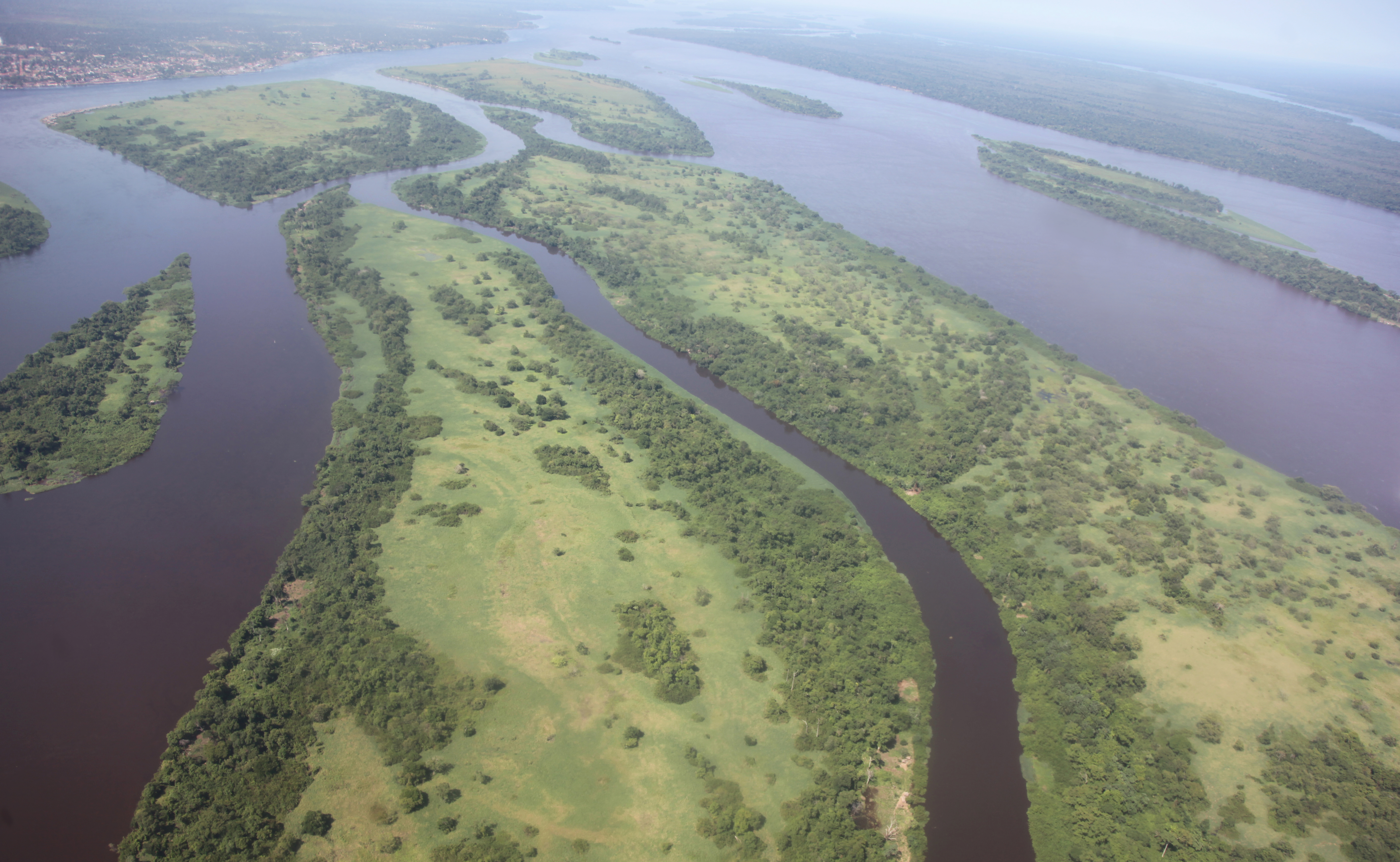
- The Congo River near Kisangani, DR Congo

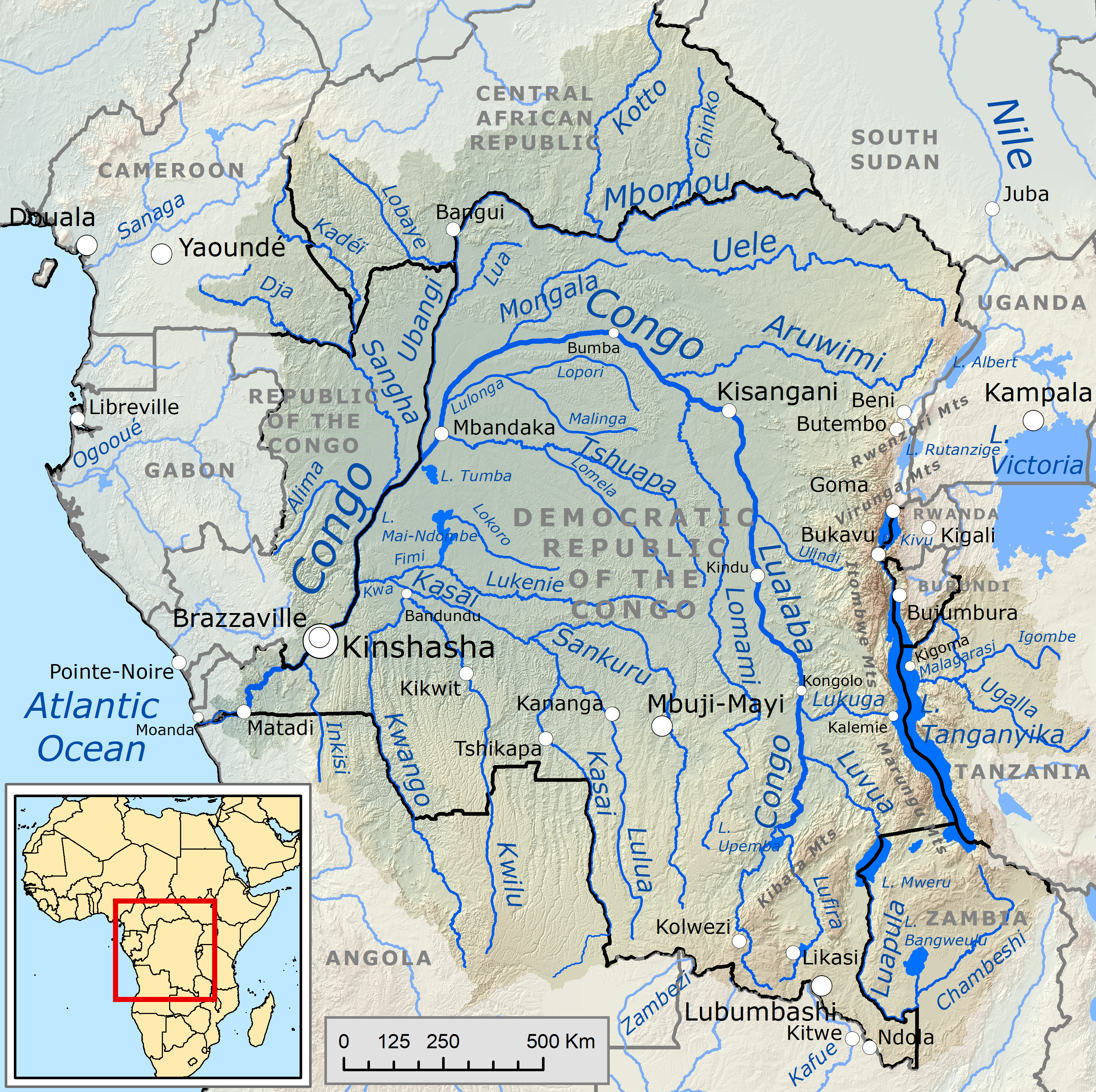
- The drainage basin of the Congo River
- Congo (red) and Lualaba (blue) rivers

Physical characteristics
- Source: Boyoma Falls
  - location: Kisangani
  - coordinates: 0°29′34″N 25°12′25″E
  - elevation: 373 m (1,224 ft)
- 2nd source: Lualaba
  - location: Katanga Plateau
  - coordinates: 11°45′53″S 26°30′10″E
  - elevation: 1,420 m (4,660 ft)
- 3rd source: Chambeshi
  - coordinates: 9°6′23″S 31°18′21″E
  - elevation: 1,760 m (5,770 ft)
- Mouth: Atlantic Ocean
  - coordinates: 06°04′30″S 12°27′00″E
  - elevation: 0 m (0 ft)
- Length: 2,300 km (1,400 mi) Congo–Lualaba–Luvua–Luapula–Chambeshi 4,700 km (2,900 mi); Congo–Lualaba 4,374 km (2,718 mi)
- Basin size: 4,014,500 km^{2} (1,550,000 sq mi)
- Width
  - minimum: 200 m (660 ft) (Lower Congo); 1,440 m (4,720 ft) (Middle Congo)
  - maximum: 19,000 m (62,000 ft) (mouth)
- Depth
  - average: 12 to 75 m (39 to 246 ft) (Lower Congo); 5 to 22 m (16 to 72 ft) (Middle Congo)
  - maximum: 220 m (720 ft) (Lower Congo); 50 m (160 ft) (Middle Congo)
- Discharge
  - location: Banana (near mouth)
  - average: 1,308 km^{3}/a (41,400 m^{3}/s) 41,860 m^{3}/s (1,478,000 cu ft/s)
  - minimum: 23,000 m^{3}/s (810,000 cu ft/s)
  - maximum: 75,000 m^{3}/s (2,600,000 cu ft/s)
- Discharge
  - location: Kinshasa, Brazzaville
  - average: (Period: 1902–2019)40,500 m^{3}/s (1,430,000 cu ft/s) (Period: 1947–2023)41,268 m^{3}/s (1,457,400 cu ft/s)
  - minimum: 22,000 m^{3}/s (780,000 cu ft/s) (1905)
  - maximum: 77,000 m^{3}/s (2,700,000 cu ft/s) (1961)
- Discharge
  - location: Kisangani
  - average: (Period: 1951–2012)7,640 m^{3}/s (270,000 cu ft/s)
  - minimum: 3,240 m^{3}/s (114,000 cu ft/s)
  - maximum: 13,930 m^{3}/s (492,000 cu ft/s)
- Discharge
  - location: Kindu
  - average: 2,213 m^{3}/s (78,200 cu ft/s)
  - minimum: 640 m^{3}/s (23,000 cu ft/s)
  - maximum: 7,640 m^{3}/s (270,000 cu ft/s)
- Discharge
  - location: Bukama
  - average: 322 m^{3}/s (11,400 cu ft/s)
  - minimum: 52 m^{3}/s (1,800 cu ft/s)
  - maximum: 1,229 m^{3}/s (43,400 cu ft/s)

Basin features
- Progression: Atlantic Ocean
- River system: Congo River
- Tributaries
  - left: Lubudi, Lovoi, Luvidjo, Kasuku, Lomami, Lulonga, Ikelemba, Ruki, Irebu, Kasai, Lufimi, Inkisi
  - right: Lufira, Luvua, Lukuga, Luama, Elila, Ulindi, Lowa, Maiko, Lindi, Aruwimi, Itimbiri, Mongala, Ubangi, Sangha, Likouala, Alima, Nkeni, Léfini, Djoué

The Congo River, (Note: Kongo: Nzâdi Kôngo, Swahili: Mto Kongo, French: Fleuve Congo, Portuguese: Rio Congo) formerly also known as the Zaire River, is the second-longest river in Africa, shorter only than the Nile, as well as the third largest river in the world by discharge volume, following the Amazon and Ganges–Brahmaputra rivers. It is the world's deepest recorded river, with measured depths of around 220 m (720 ft). The Congo–Lualaba–Luvua–Luapula–Chambeshi River system has an overall length of 4,700 km (2,900 mi), which makes it the world's ninth-longest river. The Chambeshi is a tributary of the Lualaba River, and Lualaba is the name of the Congo River upstream of Boyoma Falls, extending for 1,800 km (1,100 mi).

Measured along with the Lualaba, the main tributary, the Congo River has a total length of 4,370 km (2,720 mi). It is the only major river to cross the equator twice. The Congo Basin has a total area of about 4,000,000 km^{2} (1,500,000 mi^{2}), or 13% of the entire African landmass.

== Name ==
The name Congo/Kongo originates from the Kingdom of Kongo once located on the southern bank of the river. The kingdom in turn was named after the indigenous Bantu Kongo people, known in the 17th century as "Esikongo". South of the Kingdom of Kongo proper lay the similarly named Kakongo kingdom, mentioned in 1535. Abraham Ortelius labelled "Manicongo" as the city at the mouth of the river in his world map of 1564. (Note: Manikongo was properly the title of the kings of Kongo; their capital was at the site of modern M'banza-Kongo, capital of Angola's northwestern Zaire Province. Ortelius had no knowledge of the orography of Africa and drew fictitious courses for its rivers; his Congo upstream of its estuary turns sharply south, flowing through what would correspond to Angola and Botswana.) The tribal names in Kongo possibly derive from a word for a public gathering or tribal assembly. The modern name of the Kongo people or Bakongo was introduced in the early 20th century.

The name Zaire is from a Portuguese adaptation of a Kikongo word, nzere ("river"), a truncation of nzadi o nzere ("river swallowing rivers"). The river was known as Zaire during the 16th and 17th centuries; Congo seems to have replaced Zaire gradually in English usage during the 18th century, and Congo is the preferred English name in 19th-century literature, although references to Zahir or Zaire as the name used by the inhabitants remained common. The Democratic Republic of the Congo and the Republic of the Congo are named after it, as was the previous Republic of the Congo which had gained independence in 1960 from the Belgian Congo. The Republic of Zaire during 1971–1997 was also named after the river's name in French and Portuguese.

== Basin and course ==
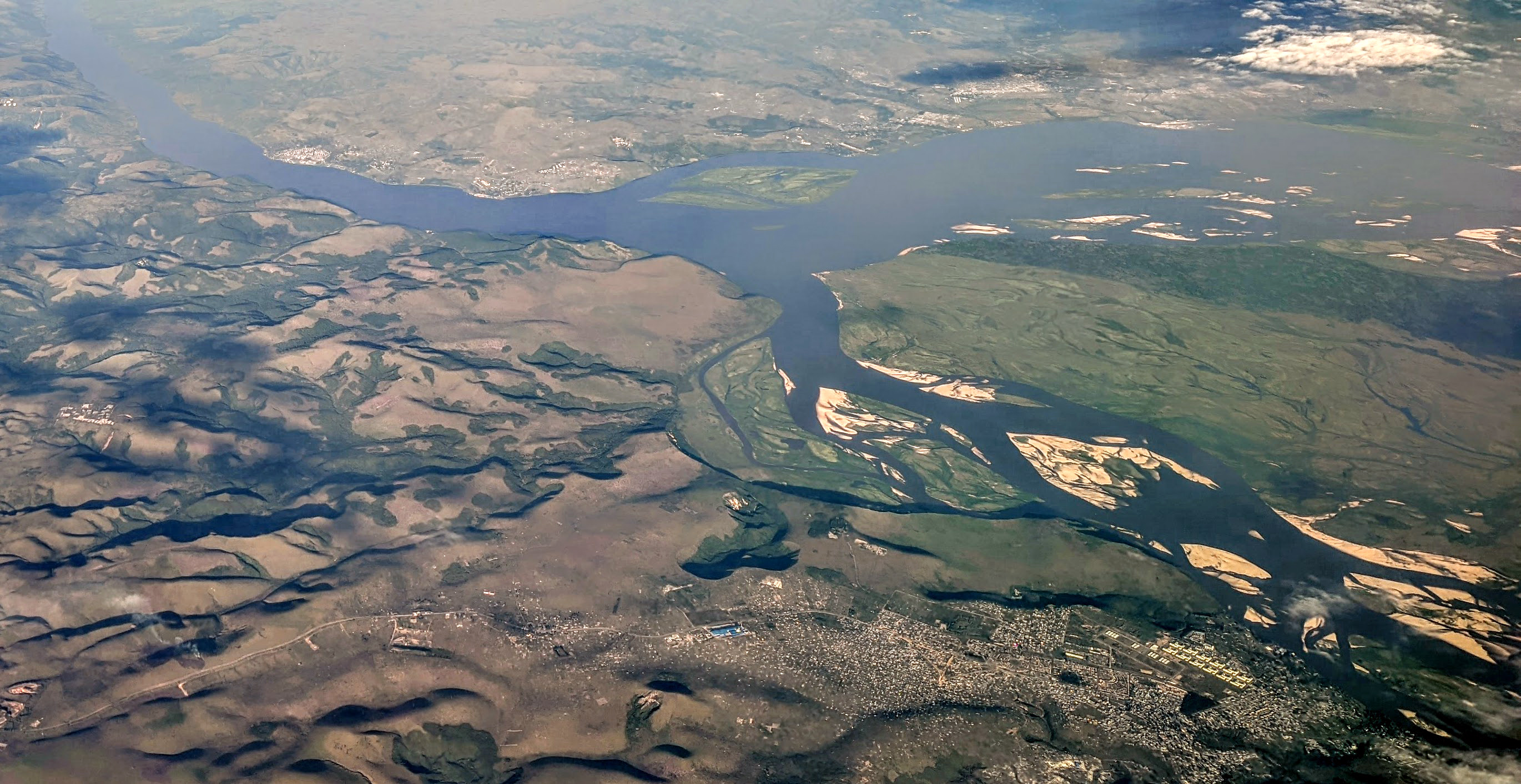
Aerial view from the west of the Congo River with upstream half of Pool Malebo and Mbamu

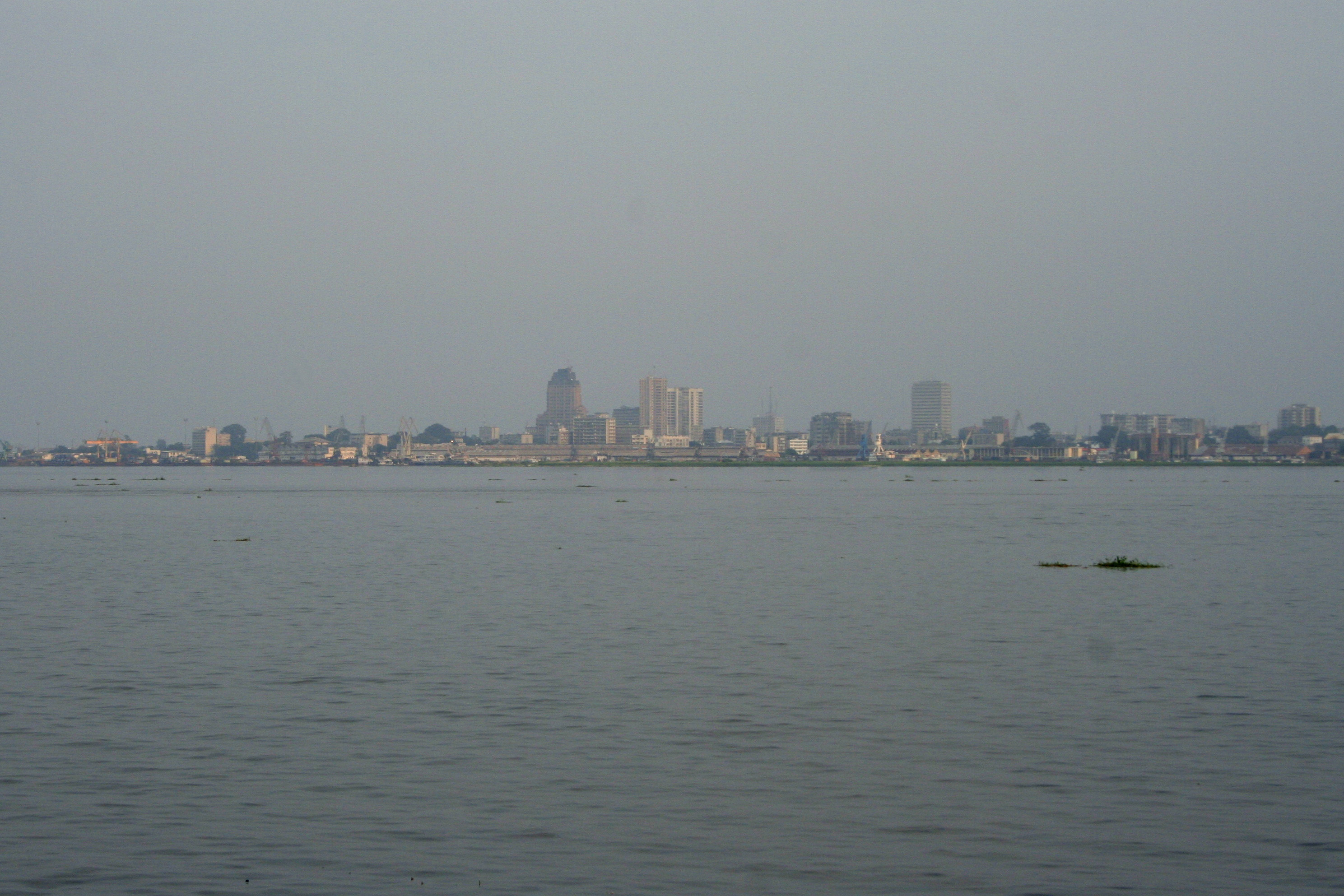
Kinshasa as seen from Brazzaville, across the Pool Malebo

The Congo's drainage basin covers 4,014,500 km^{2} (1,550,000 mi^{2}), an area nearly equal to that of the European Union. The Congo's discharge at its mouth ranges from 23,000 to 75,000 m^{3}/s (810,000 to 2,650,000 cu ft/s), with an average of 41,000 m^{3}/s (1,400,000 cu ft/s). The river transports annually 86 million tonnes of suspended sediment to the Atlantic Ocean and an additional 6% of bedload.

The river and its tributaries flow through the Congo rainforest, the second-largest rainforest area in the world, after the Amazon rainforest in South America. The third-largest river in the world by discharge volume (at mouth 41,860 m^{3}/s), following the Amazon (219,530 m^{3}/s) and Ganges–Brahmaputra–Meghna (total discharge at delta 43,950 m^{3}/s) rivers; the second-largest drainage basin of any river, behind the Amazon; and is one of the deepest rivers in the world, at depths greater than 220 m (720 ft). Because its drainage basin includes areas both north and south of the Equator, its flow is stable, as there is always at least one part of the river experiencing a rainy season.

The sources of the Congo are in the highlands and mountains of the East African Rift, as well as Lake Tanganyika and Lake Mweru, which feed the Lualaba River, which then becomes the Congo below Boyoma Falls. The Chambeshi River in Zambia is generally taken as the source of the Congo in line with the accepted practice worldwide of using the longest tributary, as with the Nile River.

The Congo flows generally toward the northwest from Kisangani just below the Boyoma Falls, then gradually bends southwestward, passing by Mbandaka, joining with the Ubangi River and running into the Pool Malebo (Stanley Pool). Kinshasa (formerly Léopoldville) and Brazzaville are on opposite sides of the river at the Pool, where the river narrows and falls through a number of cataracts in deep canyons (collectively known as the Livingstone Falls), running by Matadi and Boma, and into the sea at Muanda.

Lower Congo constitutes the "lower" parts of the great river; that is the section of the river from the river mouth at the Atlantic coast to the twin capitals of Brazzaville and Kinshasa. In this section of the river, there are two significant tributaries, both on the left or south side. The Kwilu River originates in the hills near the Angolan border and enters the Congo some 100 km upstream from Matadi. The other is the Inkisi River, that flows in a northerly direction from the Uíge Province in Angola to the confluence with the Congo at Zongo some 80 km (50 mi) downstream from the twin capitals. Because of the vast number of rapids, in particular the Livingstone Falls, this section of the river is not operated continuously by riverboats.

== Drainage basin ==
The Congo basin covers ten countries and accounts for about 13% of Africa. The highest point in the Congo basin is in the Ruwenzori Mountains, at an altitude of around 4,340 m (14,240 ft) above sea level.

Distribution of the Congo basin area between countries:

Country	Area		%
Country	km^{2}	mi^{2}	%
Congo basin total	3,712,316	1,433,333	100.00
Angola	305,760	118,050	8.24
Burundi	18,728	7,231	0.50
Cameroon	85,300	32,900	2.30
Central African Republic	402,000	155,000	10.83
Democratic Republic of the Congo	2,307,800	891,000	62.16
Gabon	1,146	442	0.03
Republic of the Congo	248,400	95,900	6.69
Rwanda	382	147	0.01
Tanzania	166,800	64,400	4.49
Zambia	176,600	68,200	4.76

The most important hydrological stations along the Congo River are
Station	Distance along river		Altitude		Basin size		Multiannual average discharge		
Station	km	mi	m	ft	km^{2}	sq mi	Start year	m^{3}/s	cu ft/s
Lower Congo
Banana	0	0	0	0	3,730,740	1,440,450	1915	41,400	1,460,000
Inga	188	117	78	256			1959	41,100	1,450,000
Kinshasa, Brazzaville	498	309	269	883	3,659,900	1,413,100	1902	40,500	1,430,000
Middle Congo
Mossaka	898	558	289	948	2,490,000	960,000			
Mbandaka	1,157	719	303	994	1,683,800	650,100	1907	19,000	670,000
Yangambi	2,133	1,325	371	1,217	1,069,100	412,800	1907	8,358	295,200
Kisangani	2,240	1,390	380	1,250	974,330	376,190	1907	7,079	250,000
Upper Congo (Lualaba)
Boyoma Falls	2,310	1,440	400	1,300			1907	6,550	231,000
Ubundu	2,390	1,490	418	1,371			1907	6,378	225,200
Kindu	2,705	1,681	448	1,470	810,440	312,910	1912	2,213	78,200
Ankoro	3,455	2,147	556	1,824	171,000	66,000	1935	901	31,800
Bukama	3,695	2,296	567	1,860	63,090	24,360	1933	322	11,400

== Discharge ==
=== Kinshasa and Brazzaville ===
The Congo River discharge at Kinshasa and Brazzaville gauging stations since the start of measurements (1902 to 2021):
Water year	Discharge in m^{3}/s (cu ft/s)			Water year	Discharge in m^{3}/s (cu ft/s)			Water year	Discharge in m^{3}/s (cu ft/s)		
Water year	Min	Mean	Max	Water year	Min	Mean	Max	Water year	Min	Mean	Max
1902/03	30,850 (1,089,000)	38,670 (1,366,000)	51,020 (1,802,000)	1942/43	31,190 (1,101,000)	42,150 (1,489,000)	55,200 (1,950,000)	1982/83	24,360 (860,000)	35,560 (1,256,000)	49,020 (1,731,000)
1903/04	28,700 (1,010,000)	40,680 (1,437,000)	53,850 (1,902,000)	1943/44	27,090 (957,000)	39,360 (1,390,000)	50,270 (1,775,000)	1983/84	24,000 (850,000)	33,310 (1,176,000)	51,700 (1,830,000)
1904/05	22,350 (789,000)	34,710 (1,226,000)	49,960 (1,764,000)	1944/45	30,960 (1,093,000)	38,890 (1,373,000)	56,250 (1,986,000)	1984/85	27,000 (950,000)	38,810 (1,371,000)	51,300 (1,810,000)
1905/06	27,280 (963,000)	38,820 (1,371,000)	48,310 (1,706,000)	1945/46	28,120 (993,000)	38,820 (1,371,000)	61,300 (2,160,000)	1985/86	24,200 (850,000)	36,740 (1,297,000)	55,400 (1,960,000)
1906/07	23,980 (847,000)	34,190 (1,207,000)	45,680 (1,613,000)	1946/47	34,900 (1,230,000)	43,470 (1,535,000)	50,350 (1,778,000)	1986/87	24,900 (880,000)	38,700 (1,370,000)	60,400 (2,130,000)
1907/08	28,350 (1,001,000)	38,950 (1,376,000)	65,760 (2,322,000)	1947/48	33,560 (1,185,000)	44,210 (1,561,000)	62,740 (2,216,000)	1987/88	25,700 (910,000)	39,110 (1,381,000)	57,300 (2,020,000)
1908/09	35,460 (1,252,000)	45,330 (1,601,000)	54,350 (1,919,000)	1948/49	29,080 (1,027,000)	39,610 (1,399,000)	53,960 (1,906,000)	1988/89	25,600 (900,000)	37,830 (1,336,000)	62,800 (2,220,000)
1909/10	29,960 (1,058,000)	41,920 (1,480,000)	60,160 (2,125,000)	1949/50	29,480 (1,041,000)	42,140 (1,488,000)	56,940 (2,011,000)	1989/90	24,300 (860,000)	35,970 (1,270,000)	55,800 (1,970,000)
1910/11	26,080 (921,000)	38,220 (1,350,000)	55,440 (1,958,000)	1950/51	28,150 (994,000)	39,610 (1,399,000)	62,780 (2,217,000)	1990/91	33,600 (1,190,000)	40,880 (1,444,000)	54,100 (1,910,000)
1911/12	30,930 (1,092,000)	40,240 (1,421,000)	53,260 (1,881,000)	1951/52	31,900 (1,130,000)	40,360 (1,425,000)	55,020 (1,943,000)	1991/92	24,000 (850,000)	34,640 (1,223,000)	49,100 (1,730,000)
1912/13	27,730 (979,000)	36,380 (1,285,000)	42,280 (1,493,000)	1952/53	25,850 (913,000)	37,100 (1,310,000)	49,370 (1,743,000)	1992/93	27,100 (960,000)	36,790 (1,299,000)	58,100 (2,050,000)
1913/14	26,280 (928,000)	35,860 (1,266,000)	56,810 (2,006,000)	1953/54	27,690 (978,000)	37,870 (1,337,000)	51,450 (1,817,000)	1993/94	30,100 (1,060,000)	38,730 (1,368,000)	53,000 (1,900,000)
1914/15	25,220 (891,000)	34,090 (1,204,000)	47,450 (1,676,000)	1954/55	32,220 (1,138,000)	44,130 (1,558,000)	60,790 (2,147,000)	1994/95	28,500 (1,010,000)	39,970 (1,412,000)	65,400 (2,310,000)
1915/16	27,760 (980,000)	38,500 (1,360,000)	59,680 (2,108,000)	1955/56	30,490 (1,077,000)	42,420 (1,498,000)	55,490 (1,960,000)	1995/96	29,500 (1,040,000)	40,860 (1,443,000)	58,900 (2,080,000)
1916/17	29,270 (1,034,000)	42,200 (1,490,000)	55,920 (1,975,000)	1956/57	32,840 (1,160,000)	42,300 (1,490,000)	54,520 (1,925,000)	1996/97	28,400 (1,000,000)	38,370 (1,355,000)	57,600 (2,030,000)
1917/18	27,440 (969,000)	34,850 (1,231,000)	43,840 (1,548,000)	1957/58	26,010 (919,000)	35,330 (1,248,000)	50,870 (1,796,000)	1997/98	32,100 (1,130,000)	45,000 (1,600,000)	71,000 (2,500,000)
1918/19	23,740 (838,000)	33,650 (1,188,000)	44,630 (1,576,000)	1958/59	25,440 (898,000)	36,500 (1,290,000)	57,720 (2,038,000)	1998/99	31,100 (1,100,000)	41,230 (1,456,000)	62,200 (2,200,000)
1919/20	27,230 (962,000)	37,880 (1,338,000)	59,540 (2,103,000)	1959/60	35,380 (1,249,000)	46,450 (1,640,000)	59,540 (2,103,000)	1999/00	28,700 (1,010,000)	40,120 (1,417,000)	69,300 (2,450,000)
1920/21	30,590 (1,080,000)	40,940 (1,446,000)	55,850 (1,972,000)	1960/61	35,060 (1,238,000)	47,410 (1,674,000)	80,830 (2,854,000)	2000/01	33,900 (1,200,000)	42,960 (1,517,000)	55,800 (1,970,000)
1921/22	25,830 (912,000)	37,980 (1,341,000)	58,140 (2,053,000)	1961/62	40,420 (1,427,000)	55,240 (1,951,000)	76,300 (2,690,000)	2001/02	29,600 (1,050,000)	43,070 (1,521,000)	66,800 (2,360,000)
1922/23	29,540 (1,043,000)	41,080 (1,451,000)	59,870 (2,114,000)	1962/63	39,630 (1,400,000)	51,230 (1,809,000)	67,950 (2,400,000)	2002/03	33,600 (1,190,000)	43,120 (1,523,000)	64,800 (2,290,000)
1923/24	30,610 (1,081,000)	42,620 (1,505,000)	63,370 (2,238,000)	1963/64	32,930 (1,163,000)	48,510 (1,713,000)	69,410 (2,451,000)	2003/04	25,800 (910,000)	38,150 (1,347,000)	56,700 (2,000,000)
1924/25	32,180 (1,136,000)	41,330 (1,460,000)	64,170 (2,266,000)	1964/65	28,370 (1,002,000)	43,100 (1,520,000)	62,350 (2,202,000)	2004/05	25,600 (900,000)	37,640 (1,329,000)	57,500 (2,030,000)
1925/26	31,770 (1,122,000)	43,920 (1,551,000)	61,660 (2,178,000)	1965/66	36,670 (1,295,000)	48,380 (1,709,000)	63,040 (2,226,000)	2005/06	26,800 (950,000)	38,090 (1,345,000)	53,100 (1,880,000)
1926/27	27,000 (950,000)	37,710 (1,332,000)	47,350 (1,672,000)	1966/67	31,420 (1,110,000)	41,770 (1,475,000)	65,540 (2,315,000)	2006/07	31,900 (1,130,000)	42,160 (1,489,000)	63,900 (2,260,000)
1927/28	31,430 (1,110,000)	41,120 (1,452,000)	51,730 (1,827,000)	1967/68	36,970 (1,306,000)	46,960 (1,658,000)	58,560 (2,068,000)	2007/08	30,700 (1,080,000)	41,590 (1,469,000)	62,000 (2,200,000)
1928/29	29,080 (1,027,000)	39,280 (1,387,000)	57,930 (2,046,000)	1968/69	43,170 (1,525,000)	51,830 (1,830,000)	66,420 (2,346,000)	2008/09	29,900 (1,060,000)	41,160 (1,454,000)	56,800 (2,010,000)
1929/30	27,860 (984,000)	40,130 (1,417,000)	48,210 (1,703,000)	1969/70	34,480 (1,218,000)	47,290 (1,670,000)	62,820 (2,218,000)	2009/10	32,100 (1,130,000)	42,010 (1,484,000)	54,600 (1,930,000)
1930/31	28,850 (1,019,000)	37,480 (1,324,000)	49,130 (1,735,000)	1970/71	28,180 (995,000)	40,040 (1,414,000)	54,330 (1,919,000)	2010/11	22,000 (780,000)	35,480 (1,253,000)	56,300 (1,990,000)
1931/32	29,860 (1,054,000)	40,700 (1,440,000)	56,380 (1,991,000)	1971/72	29,380 (1,038,000)	38,470 (1,359,000)	55,880 (1,973,000)	2011/12	24,800 (880,000)	37,070 (1,309,000)	54,900 (1,940,000)
1932/33	27,700 (980,000)	40,950 (1,446,000)	50,950 (1,799,000)	1972/73	25,760 (910,000)	37,290 (1,317,000)	50,400 (1,780,000)	2012/13	27,800 (980,000)	39,660 (1,401,000)	56,600 (2,000,000)
1933/34	31,090 (1,098,000)	40,700 (1,440,000)	63,670 (2,248,000)	1973/74	31,530 (1,113,000)	39,560 (1,397,000)	52,180 (1,843,000)	2013/14	30,300 (1,070,000)	42,080 (1,486,000)	57,800 (2,040,000)
1934/35	31,830 (1,124,000)	43,560 (1,538,000)	57,310 (2,024,000)	1974/75	29,960 (1,058,000)	41,340 (1,460,000)	63,650 (2,248,000)	2014/15	26,000 (920,000)	37,860 (1,337,000)	61,100 (2,160,000)
1935/36	32,640 (1,153,000)	41,650 (1,471,000)	56,770 (2,005,000)	1975/76	32,410 (1,145,000)	42,710 (1,508,000)	59,240 (2,092,000)	2015/16	29,800 (1,050,000)	41,360 (1,461,000)	58,700 (2,070,000)
1936/37	31,400 (1,110,000)	42,120 (1,487,000)	57,900 (2,040,000)	1976/77	33,390 (1,179,000)	45,760 (1,616,000)	57,770 (2,040,000)	2016/17	26,400 (930,000)	37,260 (1,316,000)	53,800 (1,900,000)
937/38	30,100 (1,060,000)	40,060 (1,415,000)	56,790 (2,006,000)	1977/78	33,150 (1,171,000)	43,550 (1,538,000)	62,440 (2,205,000)	2017/18	28,600 (1,010,000)	40,130 (1,417,000)	60,100 (2,120,000)
1938/39	29,040 (1,026,000)	41,260 (1,457,000)	62,380 (2,203,000)	1978/79	33,570 (1,186,000)	45,180 (1,596,000)	52,280 (1,846,000)	2018/19	28,200 (1,000,000)	40,770 (1,440,000)	70,900 (2,500,000)
1939/40	30,210 (1,067,000)	42,110 (1,487,000)	52,780 (1,864,000)	1979/80	33,340 (1,177,000)	41,150 (1,453,000)	59,530 (2,102,000)	2019/20	35,200 (1,240,000)	50,250 (1,775,000)	67,200 (2,370,000)
1940/41	31,370 (1,108,000)	40,320 (1,424,000)	57,110 (2,017,000)	1980/81	29,680 (1,048,000)	40,710 (1,438,000)	52,160 (1,842,000)	2020/21	28,700 (1,010,000)	40,830 (1,442,000)	59,200 (2,090,000)
1941/42	31,190 (1,101,000)	42,150 (1,489,000)	55,200 (1,950,000)	1981/82	29,270 (1,034,000)	38,930 (1,375,000)	49,020 (1,731,000)				

== Width and depth ==
Middle and Lower Congo width and depth:
Location	Width		Average depth		Max depth	
Location	m	ft	m	ft	m	ft
Lower Congo
5°08′55.3″S 13°59′20.5″E	1,070	3,510	49.3	162	87.1	286
Ile Soka 5°08′30.4″S 13°59′27.9″E	1,020	3,350	57.4	188	92.9	305
5°02′57.3″S 13°59′28.2″E	450	1,480			165	541
Bulu 5°01′49.5″S 14°01′37.2″E	429	1,407	62.3	204	102	335
5°01′58.6″S 14°01′37.2″E	384	1,260	43.2	142	78.1	256
5°02′07.8″S 14°01′50.3″E	388	1,273	44.1	145	78.5	258
Ile Banza 5°2′20.6″S 14°02′09.2″E	540	1,770	44.1	145	79.2	260
Luozi 4°56′50.7″S 14°09′21.2″E	2,190	7,190	11.7	38	24.2	79
Muhambi 4°55′38.5″S 14°15′16.5″E	1,010	3,310	33.9	111	78.2	257
Pioka 4°54′03.3″S 14°24′18.2″E	1,460	4,790	75.3	247	118	387
Kinshasa– Brazzaville 4°16′47.3″S 15°18′32.8″E	3,264	10,709	9.0	29.5	15.7	52
Middle Congo
Maloukou 4°05′24.4″S 15°30′39.1″E			14.8	49	36.3	119
Léchia 3°52′43.4″S 15°55′11.6″E			21.5	71	50.3	165
Kounzoulou–Miranda 3°33′18.7″S 16°05′32.2″E			20.9	69	45.0	147.6
Kunzulu 3°28′52.5″S 16°07′18.3″E	1,540	5,050	16.8	55		
Kwamouth 3°11′23.7″S 16°11′09.6″E	1,905	6,250	12.7	42		
Kasai at mouth 3°10′36.4″S 16°11′41.5″E	606	1,988	12.7	42		
Congo at Kasai mouth 3°09′59.7″S 16°10′51.7″E	1,851	6,073	12.9–15.3	42–50	39.9	131
Mbali–Mosebwaka 2°48′33.9″S 16°11′40.1″E			8.4	28	26.7	88
Bouemba 2°12′22.9″S 16°10′49.0″E			7.0	23.0	22.2	73
Bolobo 2°09′28.5″S 16°12′16.5″E	4,119	13,514	7.2	24		
Yumbi 1°52′15.5″S 16°30′43.4″E			7.1	23	19.7	65
Bounda 1°37′55.5″S 16°37′59.4″E			8.0	26.2	19.7	65
Mossaka 1°14′22.2″S 16°47′44.5″E			7.6	25	19.2	63
Lukolela 1°03′13.5″S 17°08′58.0″E	1,757	5,764	8.0–11.7	26.2–38.4	32.0	105.0
Bweta–Manga 0°54′39.2″S 17°23′27.1″E	1,865–5,083	6,119–16,677	5.0–6.1	16.4–20.0		
Yambe 0°43′38.5″S 17°33′02.9″E	2,468	8,097	11.8	39		
Liranga 0°41′00.4″S 17°36′43.7″E			7.9	26	32.7	107
Bomenenge–Mikuka 0°25′58.1″S 17°50′13.3″E			7.6	25	23.7	78
Mbandaka 0°01′17.4″N 18°13′10.9″E			8.5	28	31.8	104
Kisangani 0°30′22.1″N 25°11′03.4″E	1,440	4,720	6.0–7.5	19.7–24.6		

== Tributaries ==
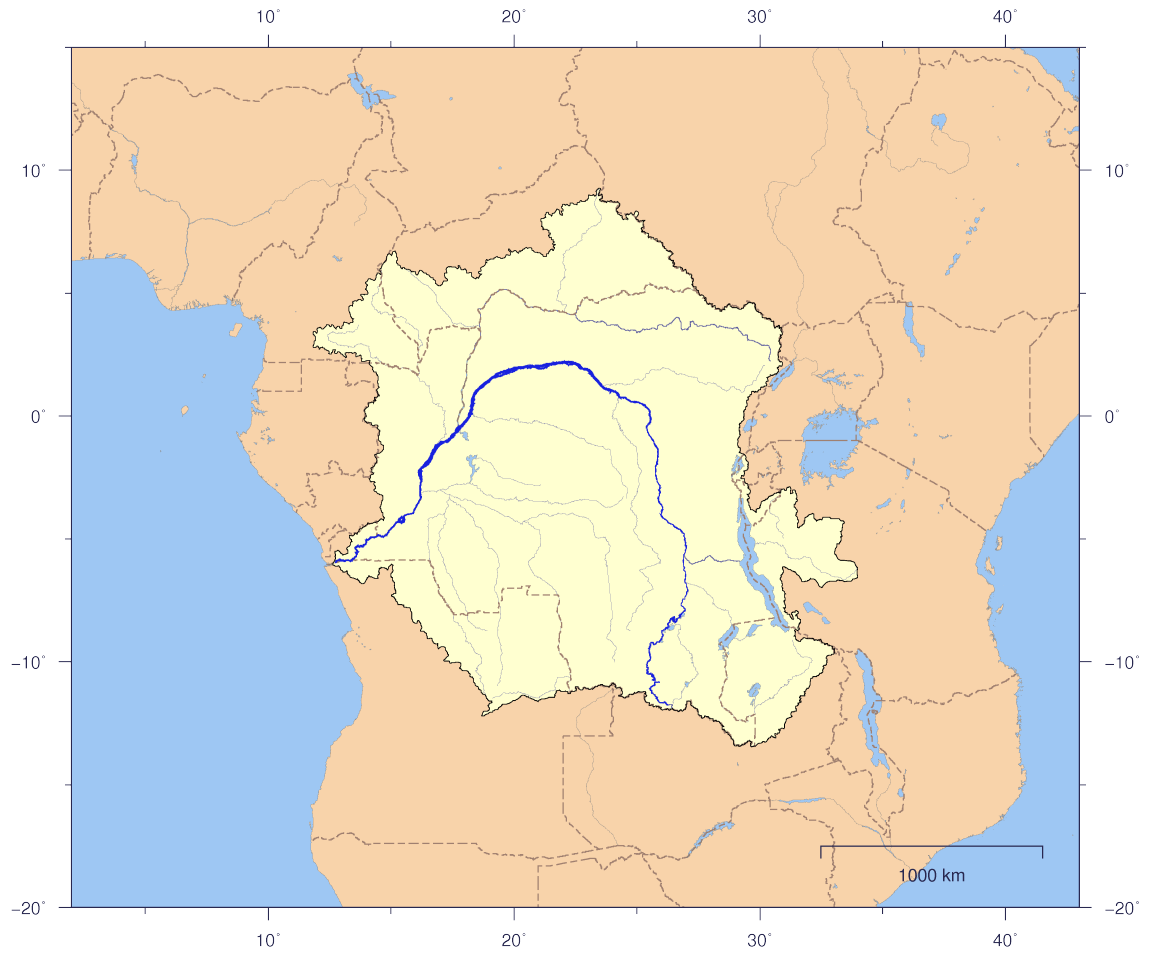
Course and drainage basin of the Congo River with countries marked

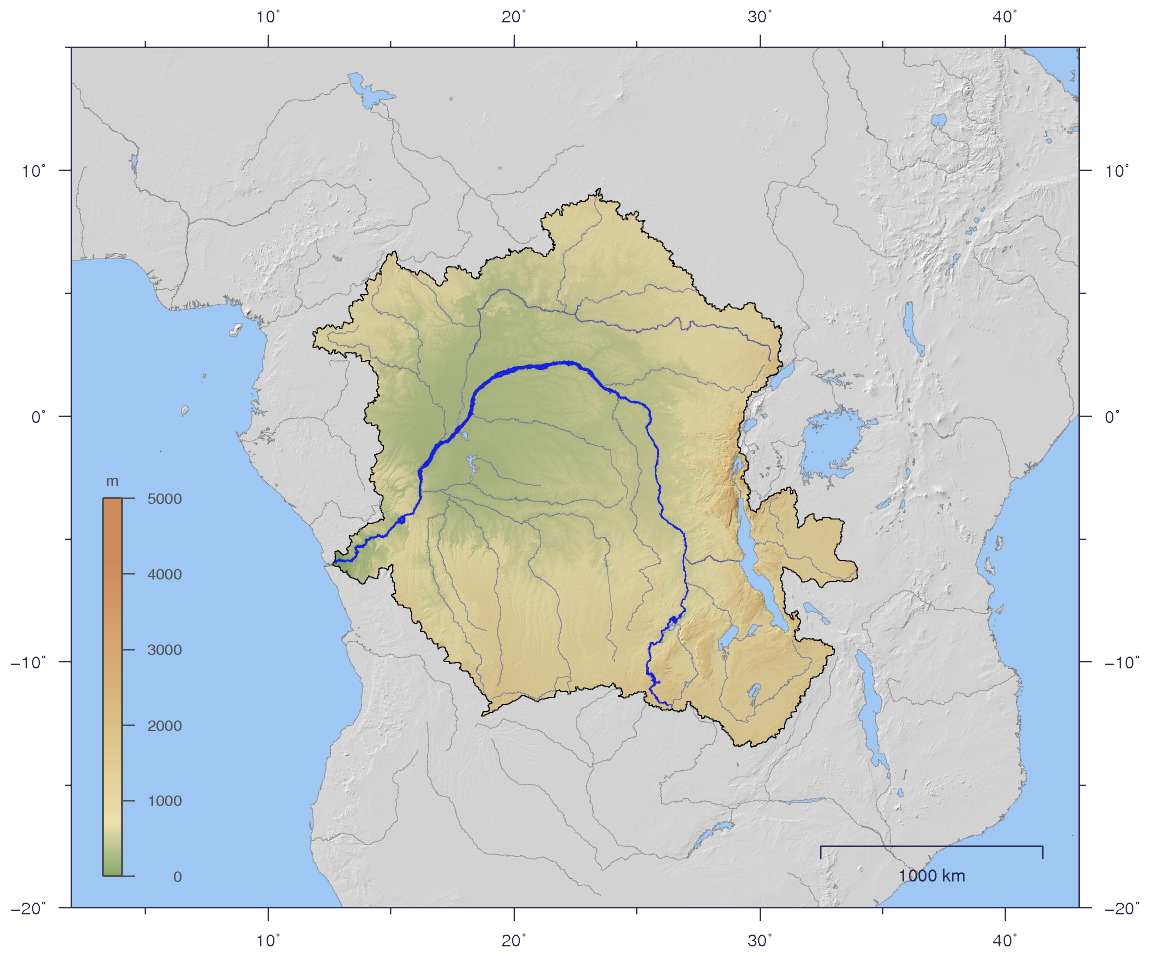
Course and drainage basin of the Congo River with topography shading

The main river and tributaries are (sorted in order from the mouth heading upstream):
Left tributary	Right tributary	Length		Basin size		Average discharge	
Left tributary	Right tributary	km	mi	km^{2}	sq mi	m^{3}/s	cu ft/s
Congo		4,374	2,718	3,712,316	1,433,333	41,400	1,460,000
Lower Congo (river mouth to Kinshasa)
	Luki					14.4	510
Lué-Grande				2,786.7	1,076.0	25.7	910
Fuila		150	93	1,051.5	406.0	8.9	310
M'pozo		170	110	6,932.5	2,676.7	78.8	2,780
Lufu		190	120	2,586.3	998.6	27.7	980
Kwilu		284	176	6,500	2,500	89.4	3,160
	Lwala			2,322.2	896.6	26.6	940
Lukunga		221	137	2,166.9	836.6	25.1	890
	Yambi	65	40	1,262.3	487.4	19.4	690
Mpioka		31	19	788.7	304.5	10.1	360
Lunzadi				753.9	291.1	11.1	390
Inkisi		559	347	13,500	5,200	291.1	10,280
	Foulakary	127	79	3,230.5	1,247.3	51.1	1,800
	Djoué	175	109	6,225	2,403	158.4	5,590
Middle Congo (Kinshasa to the Boyoma Falls)
N'djili		93	58	2,258.9	872.2	38.5	1,360
Nsele		193	120	4,500	1,700	77.1	2,720
	Djiri	63	39	1,395.5	538.8	31.3	1,110
	Yana			663.3	256.1	15.1	530
Lufimi		268	167	11,500	4,400	199	7,000
	Mary			3,529	1,363	84.6	2,990
Mai Mpili		62	39	759.7	293.3	13	460
Lidji		108	67	1,686	651	24.5	870
Kasai		2,153	1,338	884,370	341,460	11,600	410,000
	Gam-bomba			1,372.7	530.0	29.3	1,030
	Léfini	418	260	14,951.1	5,772.7	423.1	14,940
	M'Pouya			1,175.5	453.9	21.2	750
	N'Goindi			1,537.2	593.5	30	1,100
Gampoka				1,036.8	400.3	10.7	380
	Nkeni	331	206	8,249.6	3,185.2	209.5	7,400
	Nkeme			3,154	1,218	39.4	1,390
Nsolu				4,129	2,566	39.1	1,380
Sangasi		64	40	2,020.9	780.3	19.4	690
	Alima	577	359	23,192.7	8,954.8	700	25,000
	Likouala	615	382	69,800	26,900	1,053.5	37,200
	Sangha	1,395	867	191,953	74,113	2,471	87,300
Pama		50	31	2,202.7	850.5	24.7	870
Manga		43	27	1,337.7	516.5	17.7	630
Irebu		35	22	7,380	2,850	105.5	3,730
	Ubangi	2,299	1,429	651,918	251,707	5,936	209,600
Ruki		1,200	750	173,790	67,100	4,500	160,000
Ikelemba		345	214	12,510	4,830	222.1	7,840
Lulonga		705	438	76,950	29,710	2,040	72,000
	Moeko	190	120	4,346.3	1,678.1	40.5	1,430
	Mongala	663	412	52,200	20,200	708.6	25,020
Lofofe				1,333.8	515.0	22.5	790
	Mioka	93	58	1,872	723	30.2	1,070
Isambi				2,135.7	824.6	36.6	1,290
	Molua	71	44	1,566.6	604.9	24.7	870
	Itimbiri	700	430	50,490	19,490	773.2	27,310
	Makpulu			1,279.1	493.9	22.6	800
	Loie			682.3	263.4	12.5	440
	Moliba			1,363.2	526.3	24.8	880
	Ikot			987.2	381.2	20.3	720
	Mokeke			695	268	12.9	460
	Lula			582	225	10.9	380
Lunua				612.3	236.4	12.5	440
	Aruwimi	1,287	800	116,100	44,800	2,200	78,000
Loleka				1,349.6	521.1	27.1	960
Lukombe				2,931.8	1,132.0	53.3	1,880
Lomami		2,063	1,282	109,080	42,120	2,061.8	72,810
	Lubilu			1,222.3	471.9	20	710
Romée				601.9	232.4	10	350
	Lubania			743.1	286.9	11.5	410
	Lindi	797	495	60,300	23,300	1,200	42,000
Upper Congo (Lualaba; upstream from the Boyoma Falls)
Yoko				866.1	334.4	15.5	550
	Maiko	516	321	13,935.7	5,380.6	318.7	11,250
Oluka				495.2	191.2	10	350
	Obiautku			1,290.1	498.1	33.9	1,200
	Lilu	281	175	6,381.5	2,463.9	192.4	6,790
Ruiki		203	126	5,540.2	2,139.1	125.8	4,440
Lilo		202	126	3,684.8	1,422.7	92.8	3,280
	Lowa	615	382	49,590	19,150	1,624.8	57,380
	Ulindi	803	499	30,240	11,680	901.7	31,840
Kasuku		397	247	11,468.1	4,427.9	175.8	6,210
	Ambe	96	60	2,231.8	861.7	69.1	2,440
	Luti			771	298	22.4	790
	Elila	670	420	27,360	10,560	678.1	23,950
Lueki		205	127	6,494.3	2,507.5	58.8	2,080
	Kiha-muwa	182	113	1,362	526	23.8	840
	Kabila	70	43	2,229.6	860.9	22	780
Lowe		49	30	2,306.4	890.5	16.3	580
Ganze		25	16	1,331.6	514.1	8.7	310
Lubutu		212	132	8,419.5	3,250.8	57	2,000
	Kunda	96	60	5,749.1	2,219.7	41.4	1,460
Mulongoi		219	136	4,754.5	1,835.7	21.9	770
	Lulindi	190	120	3,515	1,357	17.4	610
	Luama	741	460	25,099.1	9,690.8	221	7,800
	Luika	223	139	6,214.2	2,399.3	17.6	620
	Luvilo			1,126.5	434.9	4.1	140
	Lufutuka			1,792.7	692.2	6.9	240
	Lukuga	350	220	271,580	104,860	271	9,600
Lubanzi				3,045.7	1,176.0	19.3	680
Kay				1,742	673	8.6	300
Lukuswa				1,822.1	703.5	7.7	270
	Luboy			1,644.3	634.9	4.4	160
Luvidjo		240	150	11,312.4	4,367.7	69.7	2,460
	Kalongwe			1,208.1	466.5	3.7	130
	Luvua	388	241	265,260	102,420	600	21,000
	Kai			1,142.7	441.2	6.5	230
Lubumbu				1,342.4	518.3	8.8	310
	Kalumen- gongo	329	204	8,069.3	3,115.6	66.9	2,360
Lovoi		385	239	19,624.6	7,577.1	185.8	6,560
	Lufira	911	566	51,480	19,880	502	17,700
Lubudi		490	300	27,500	10,600	191.5	6,760
	Kalule	172	107	4,208.8	1,625.0	28.6	1,010
Musonoi				1,539.7	594.5	7.7	270
Lufupa		155	96	5,070.7	1,957.8	36.8	1,300
	Kando	191	119	2,455.5	948.1	16.1	570
	Nyund-welu			1,319.4	509.4	10.1	360
	Lukonga	131	81	1,721.2	664.6	10.2	360
Mukwishi		61	38	1,562	603	12.2	430

Lower Congo (river mouth to Kinshasa) Downstream of Kinshasa, from the river mouth at Banana, there are a few major tributaries.

- M'pozo (left)
- Kwilu (left)
- Inkisi (left)
- Foulakary (right)
- Djoué (right)

Middle Congo (Kinshasa to the Boyoma Falls)

- Nsele (left)
- Lufimi (left)
- Mary (right)
- Kwa–Kasai (left)
  - Fimi
    - Lukenie
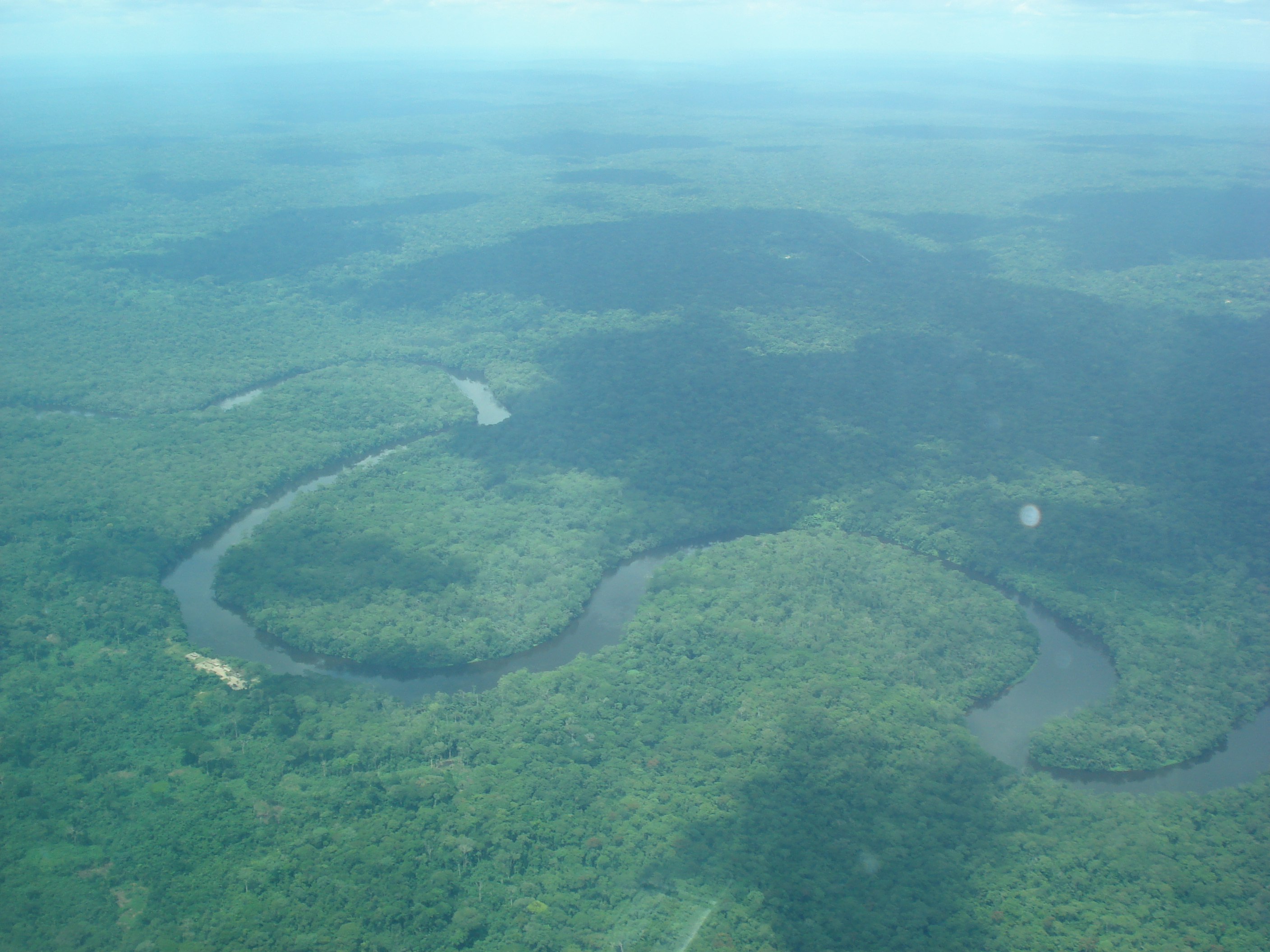
      Aerial view of the Lukenie River as it meanders through the Central Congolian lowland forests
    - Lokoro—Lake Mai-Ndombe
  - Kwango
    - Culio
    - Wamba
    - Kwilu
      - Kwenge
      - Inzia
  - Loange
  - Sankuru
    - Lubilanji
    - Lubefu
    - Lubudi
  - Lulua
  - Chicapa
  - Luachimo
  - Lubembe
    - Chiumbe
- Léfini (right)
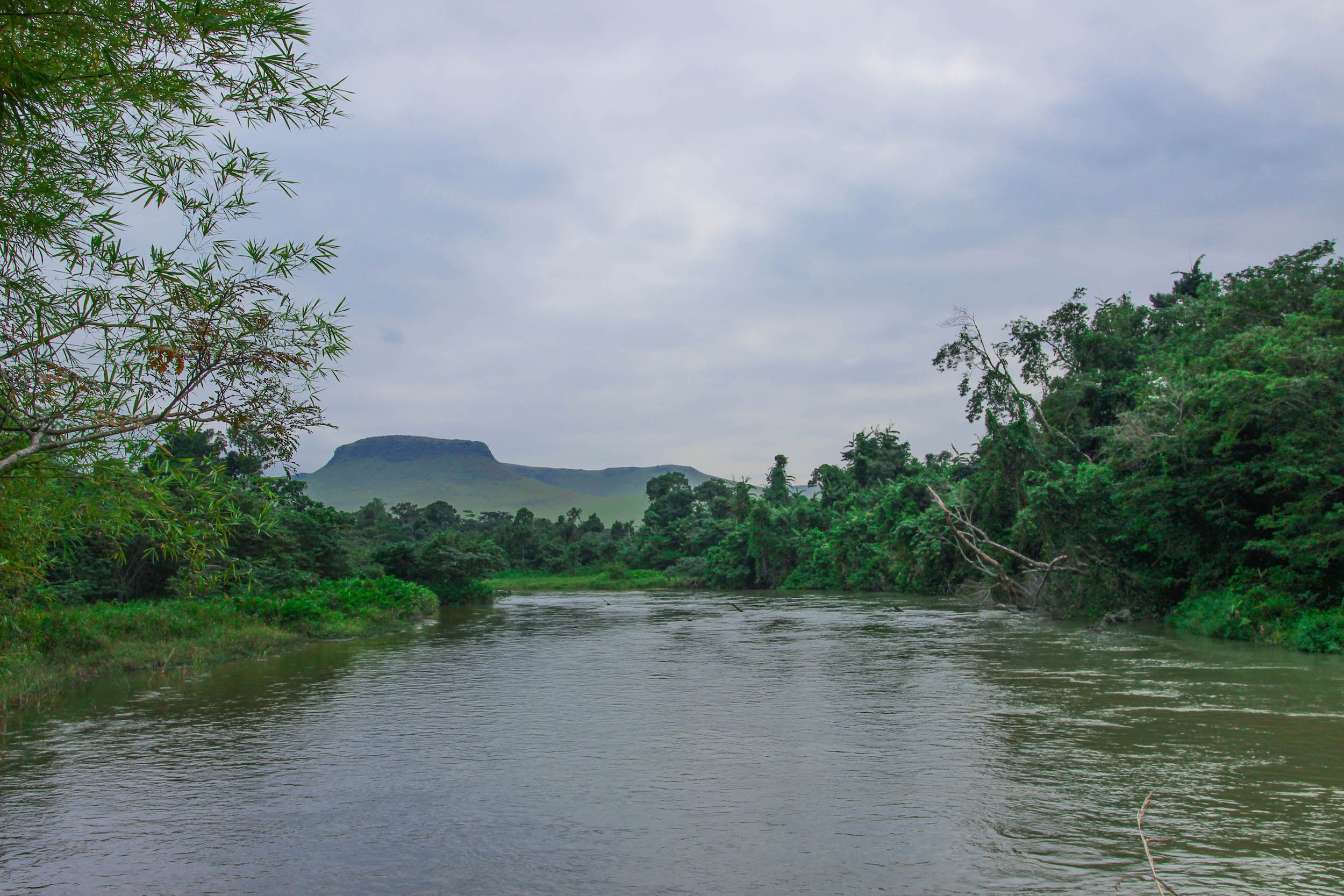
  Léfini River
- Nkeni (right)
- Alima (right)
- Likouala-Mossaka (right)
- Sangha (right)
  - Likouala aux Herbes
  - Ngoko
    - Boumba
  - Kadéï (570 km, 41,000 km^{2}, 466 m^{3}/s)
  - Mambéré
- Ubangi (right)
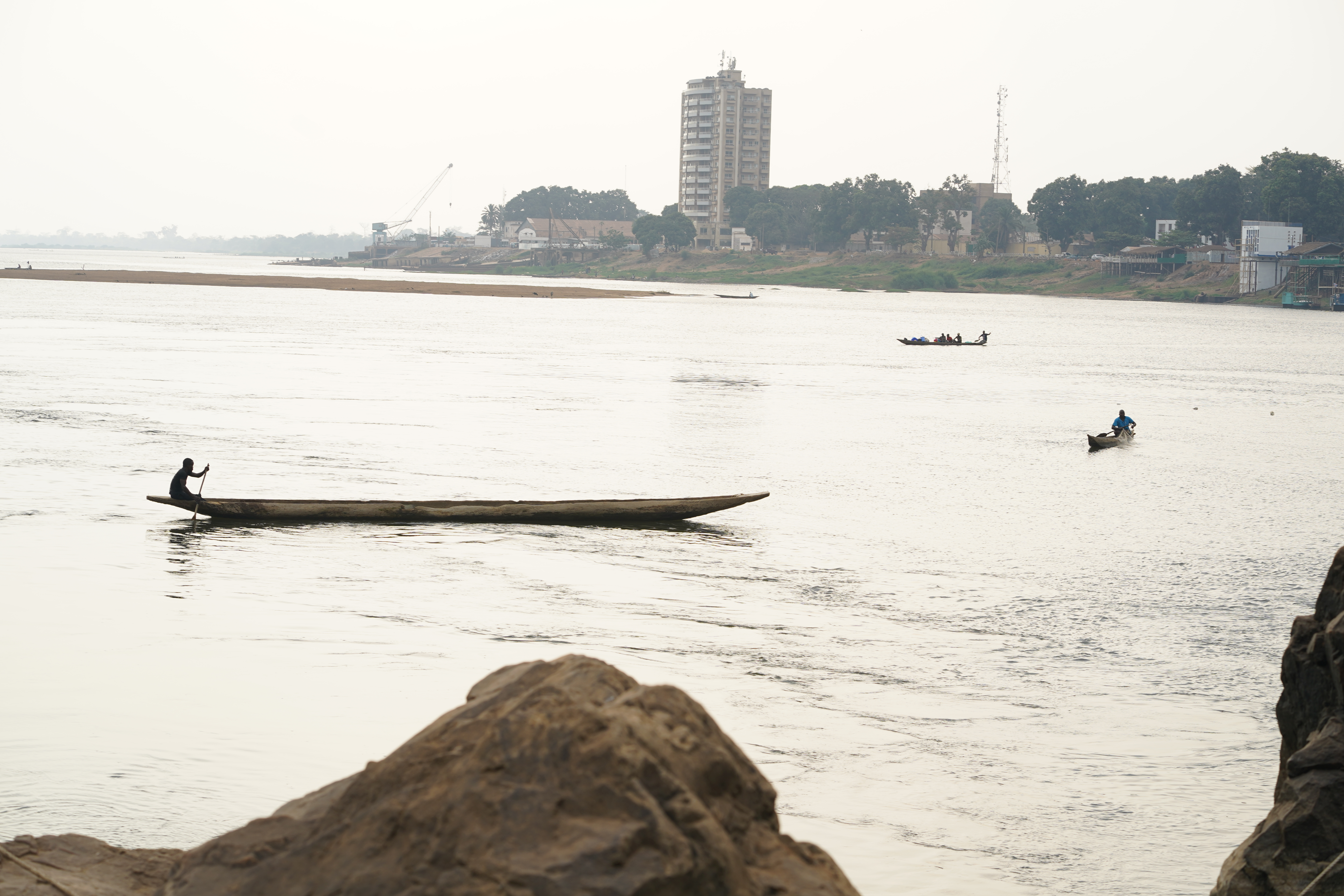
  Ubangi River
  - Giri
  - Lua
  - Lobaye
  - Mbali
  - Ouaka
  - Kotto
  - Mbomou
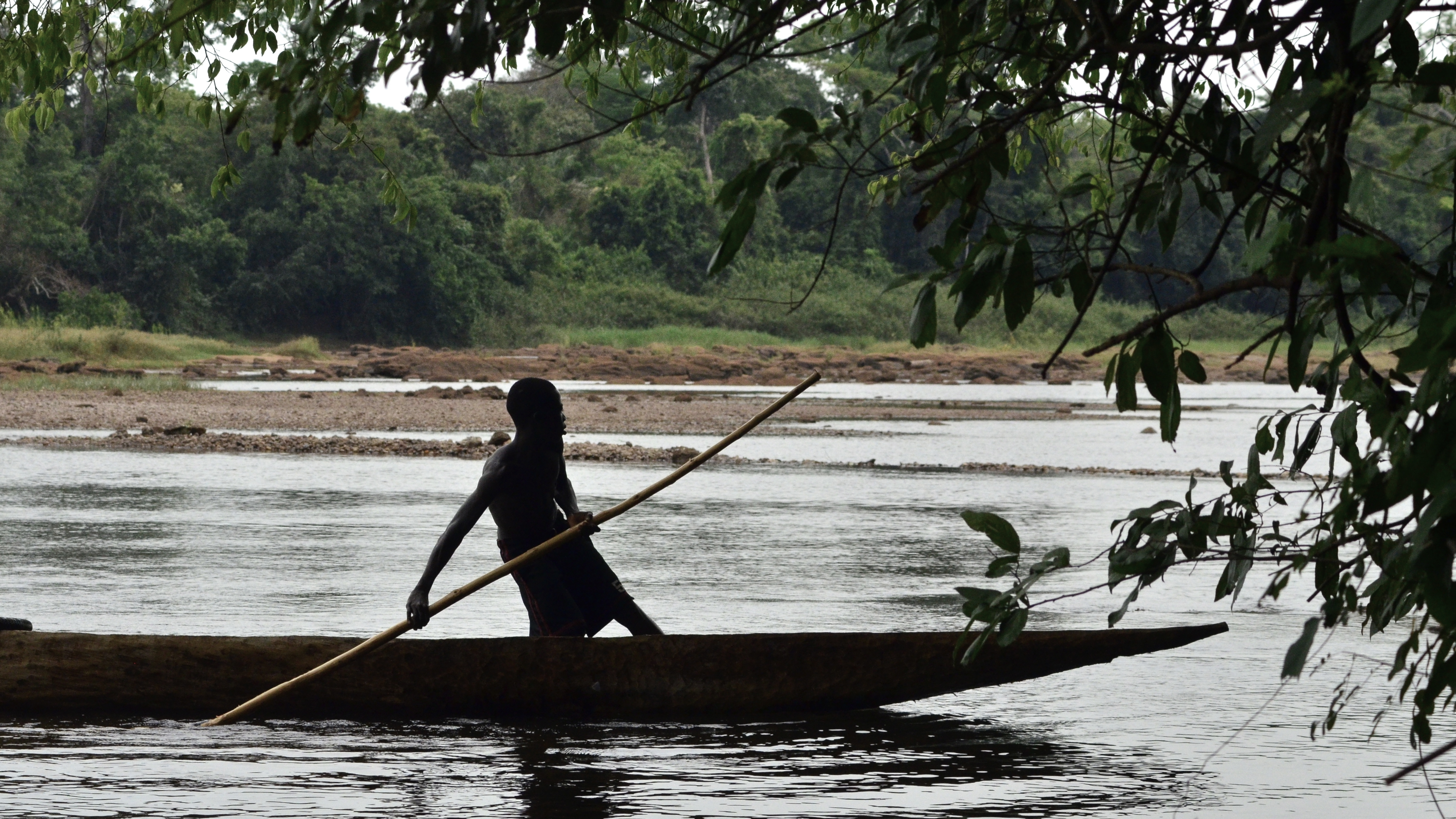
    Man on the Mbomou River, between Bangassou and Ndu
    - Chinko
    - Mbari
    - Bili
  - Uele
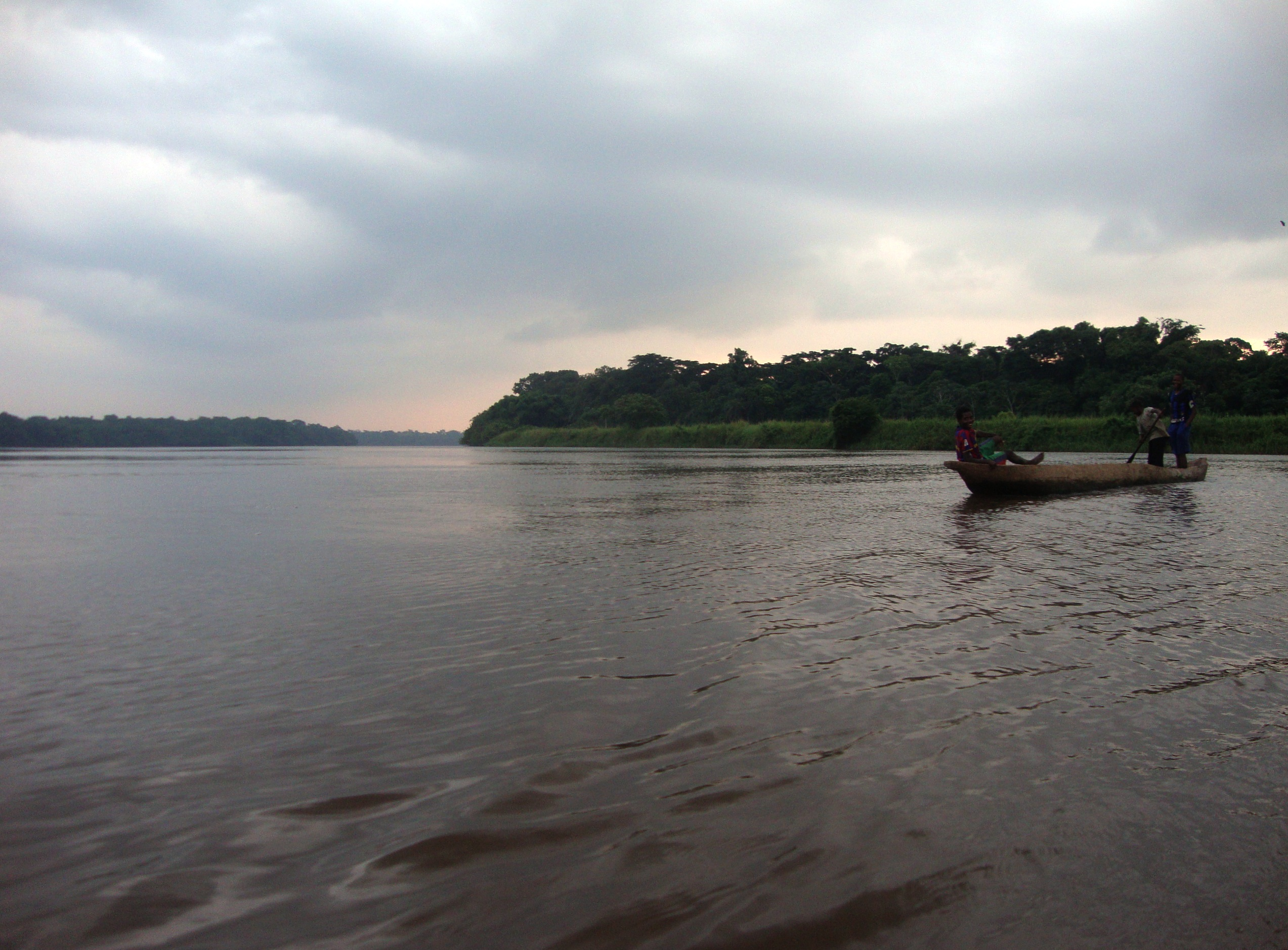
    Uele River
    - Kibali
    - Dungu
    - Bomokandi
    - Uere
- Irebu—Lake Tumba (left)
- Ruki (left)
  - Momboyo
  - Busira
    - Salonga
    - Tshuapa or Ruki (left)
      - Lomela
- Ikelemba (left)
- Lulonga (left)
  - Lopori
  - Maringa
- Moeko (right)
- Mongala (right)
- Itimbiri (right)
- Aruwimi (right)
  - Ituri
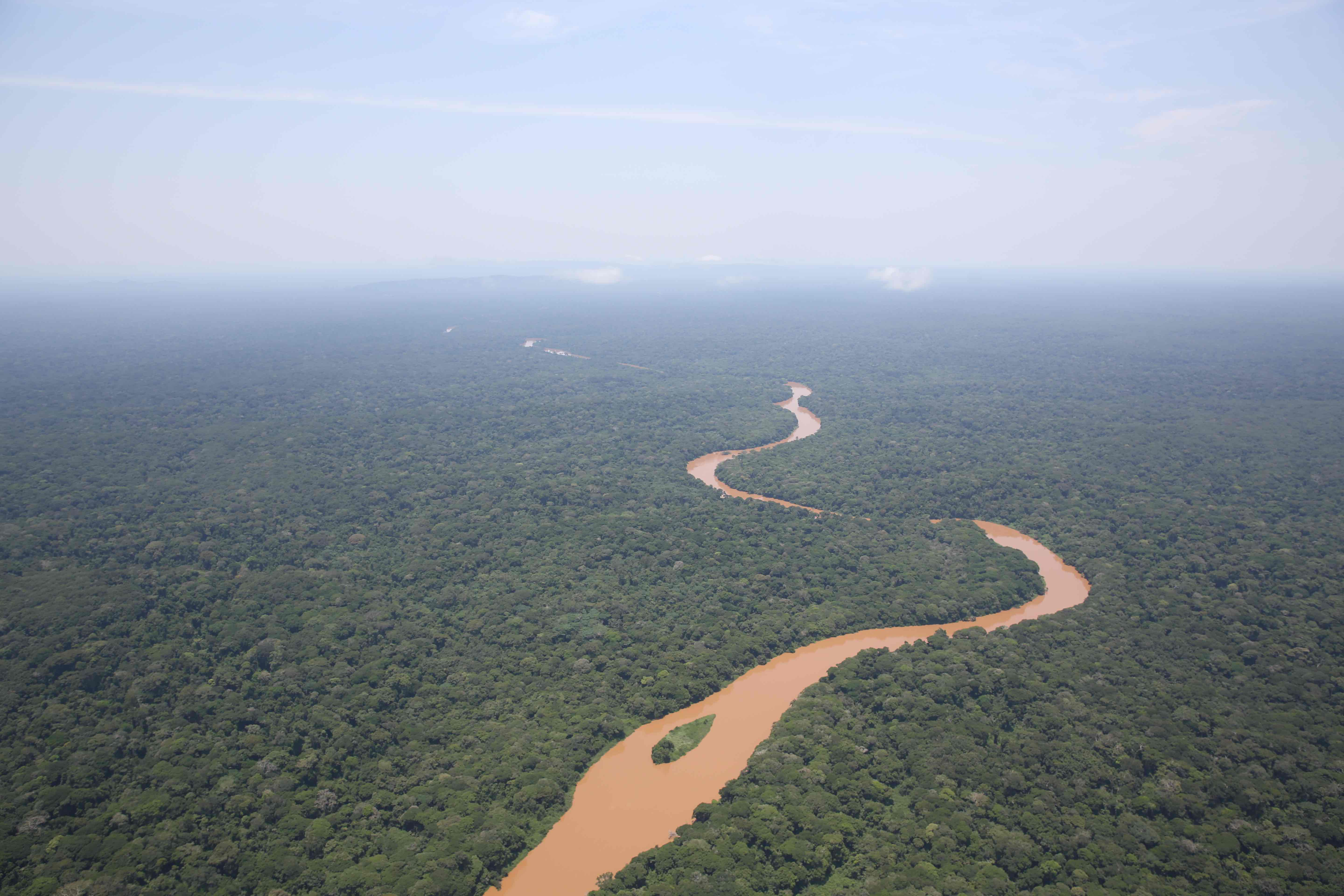
    A river flowing through the Ituri Rainforest
  - Nepoko
- Lukombe (left)
- Lomami (left)
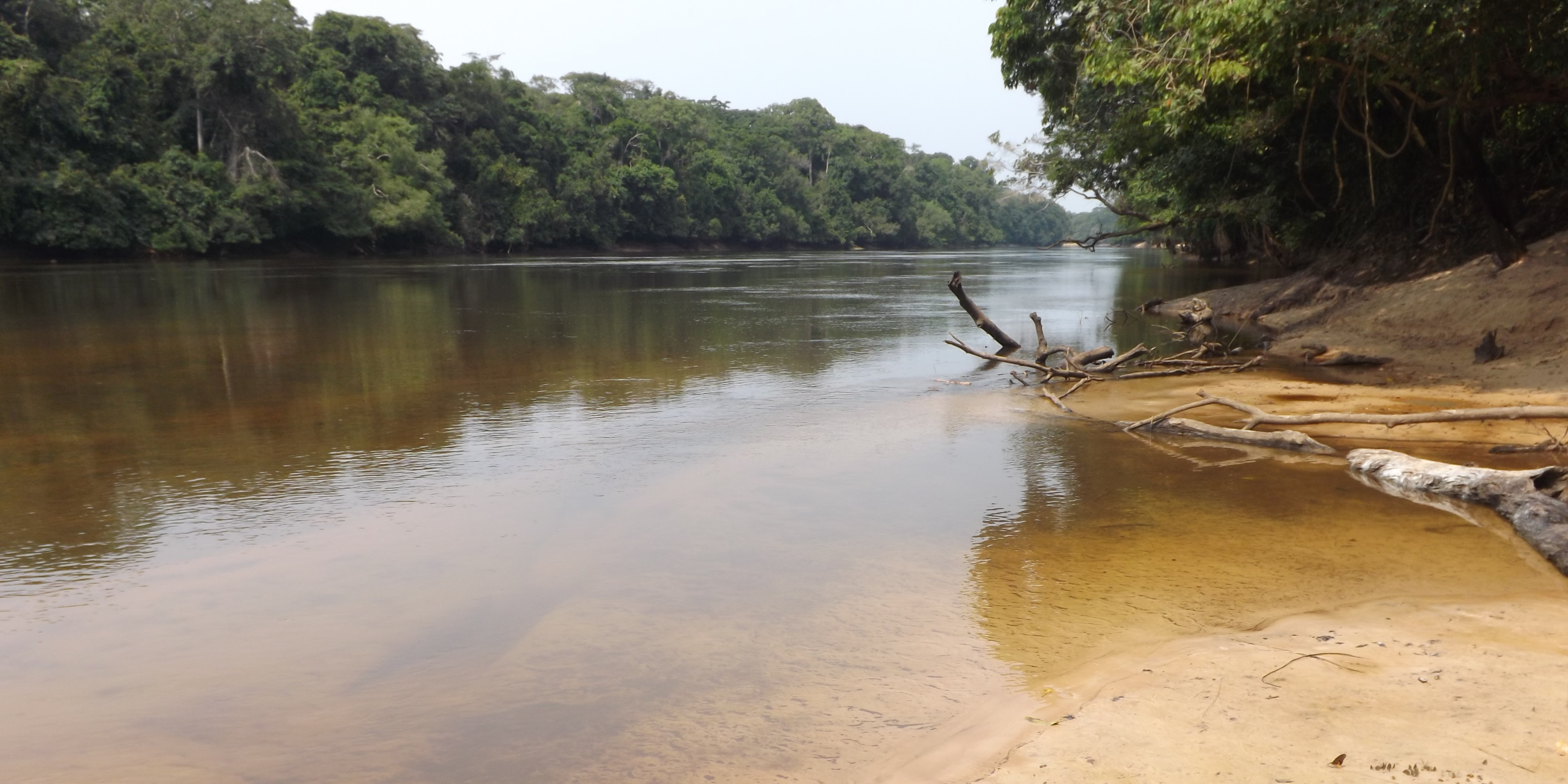
  Lomami River
- Lindi (right)
  - Tshopo
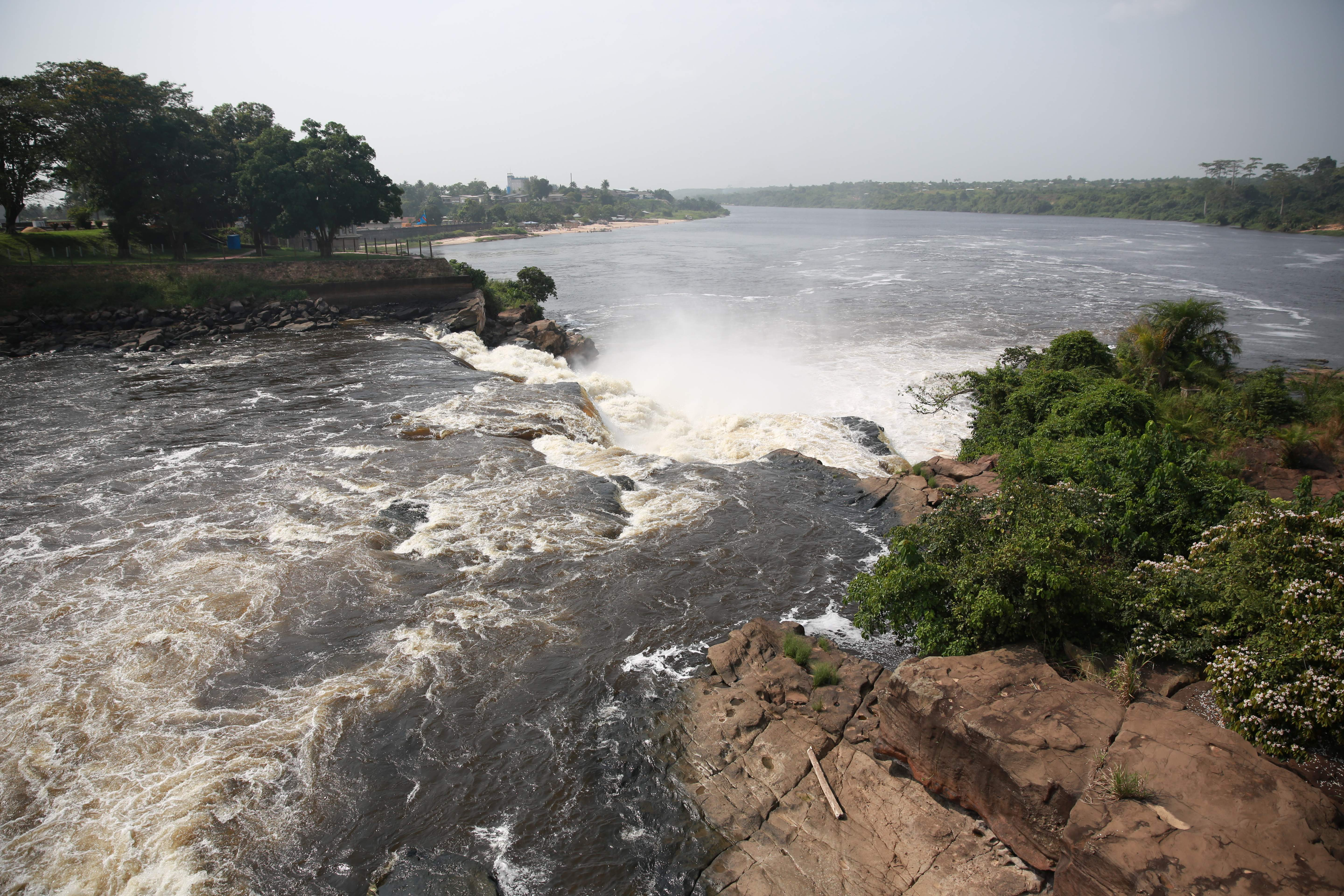
    Cascades of the Tshopo River
- Maiko (right)

Upper Congo (Lualaba; upstream from the Boyoma Falls)

- Lilu (right)
- Ruiki (left)
- Lilo (left)
- Lowa (right)
  - Oso
- Ulindi (right)
  - Lugulu
- Kasuku (left)
- Ambe (right)
- Elila (right)
- Loho (left)
- Lubutu (left)
- Kunda (right)
- Luama (right)
- Luika (right)
- Lukuga (right)
  - Rusizi (Lake Tanganyika)
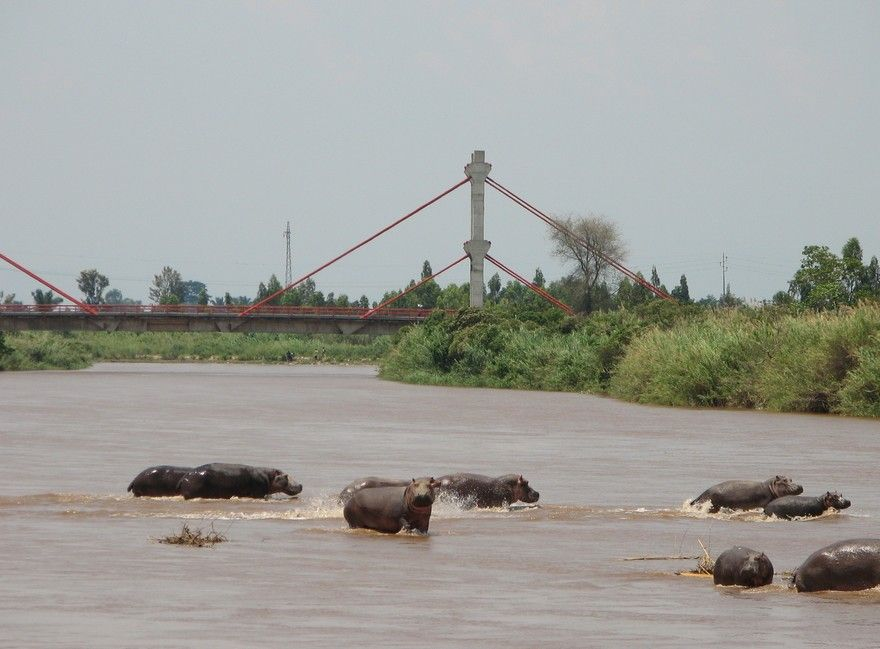
    Ruzizi River
  - Malagarasi (Lake Tanganyika)
    - Ugalla
    - Gombe
      - Moyowosi
- Luvidjo (left)
- Luvua (right)
  - Kalungwishi (Lake Mweru)
  - Luapula (Lake Mweru; 740 km, 173,386 km², 741 m^{3}/s)
    - Chambeshi (Lake Bangweulu, Bangweulu swamp; 500 km, 44,427 km², 185 m^{3}/s)
- Kalumengongo (right)
- Lovoi (left)
- Lufira (right)
- Lubudi (left)
- Lufupa (left)

== Economic importance ==
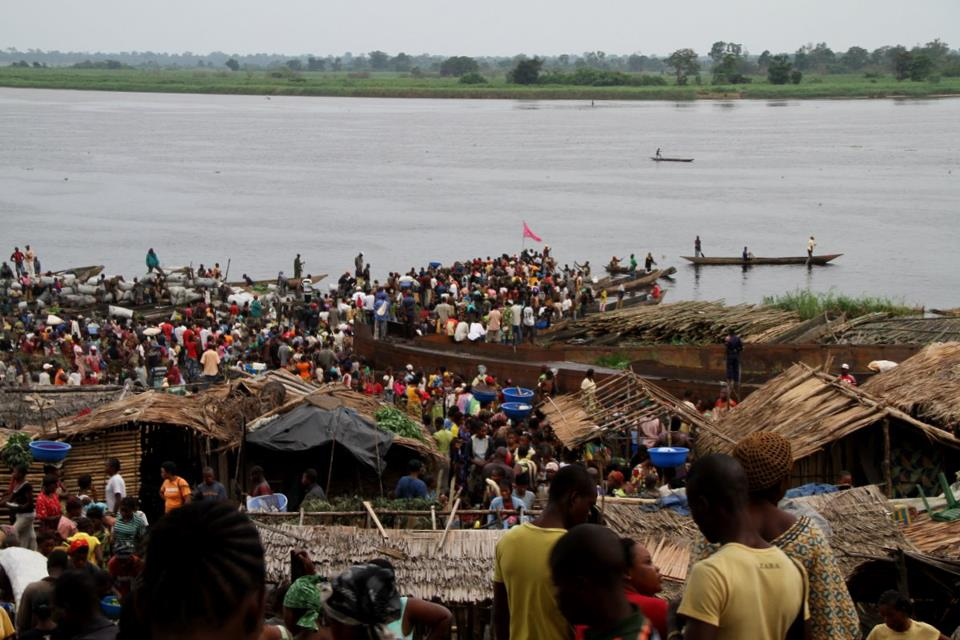
The town of Mbandaka is a busy port on the banks of the Congo River.

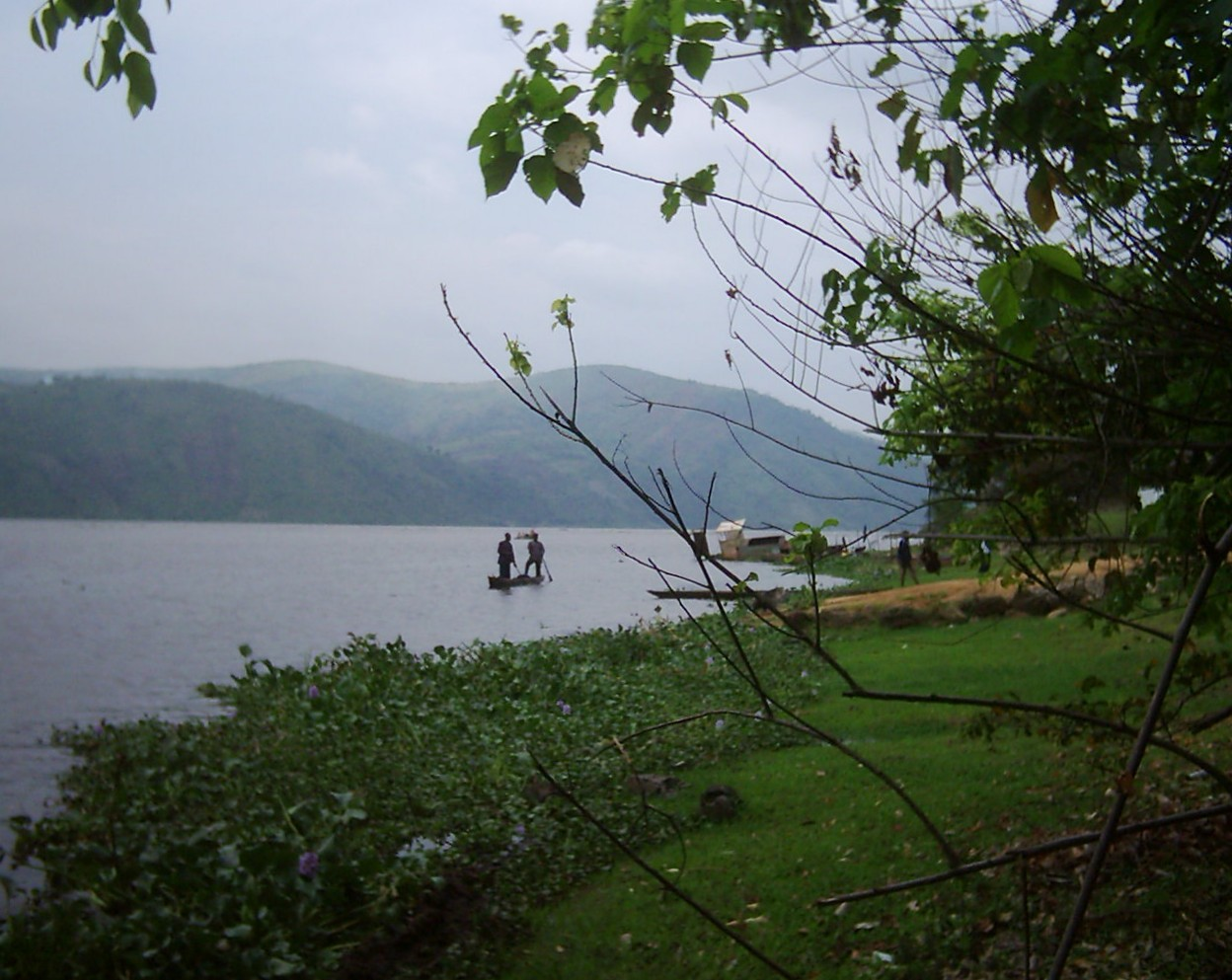
The Congo River at Maluku.

Although the Livingstone Falls prevent access from the sea, nearly the entire Congo above them is readily navigable in sections, especially between Kinshasa and Kisangani. Large river steamers worked the river until quite recently. The Congo River still is a lifeline in a land with few roads or railways. Railways now bypass the three major falls, and much of the trade of Central Africa passes along the river, including copper, palm oil (as kernels), sugar, coffee, and cotton.

=== Hydroelectric power ===
The Congo River is the most powerful river in Africa. During the rainy season over 50,000 cubic metres (1,800,000 cu ft) of water per second flows into the Atlantic Ocean. Opportunities for the Congo River and its tributaries to generate hydropower are therefore enormous. Scientists have calculated that the entire Congo Basin accounts for 13 percent of global hydropower potential. This would provide sufficient power for all of Sub-Saharan Africa's electricity needs.

Currently, there are about 40 hydropower plants in the Congo Basin. The largest are the Inga dams, about 200 kilometres (120 mi) southwest of Kinshasa. The project was launched in the early 1970s, when the first dam was completed. The plan (as originally conceived) called for the construction of five dams that would have had a total generating capacity of 34,500 megawatts (MW). To date only the Inga I and Inga II dams have been built, generating 1,776 MW.

In February 2005, South Africa's state-owned power company, Eskom, announced a proposal to expand generation through improvements and the construction of a new hydroelectric dam. The project would bring the maximum output of the facility to 40,000 megawatts (MW). It is feared that these new hydroelectric dams could lead to the extinction of many of the fish species that are native to the river.

== Natural history ==
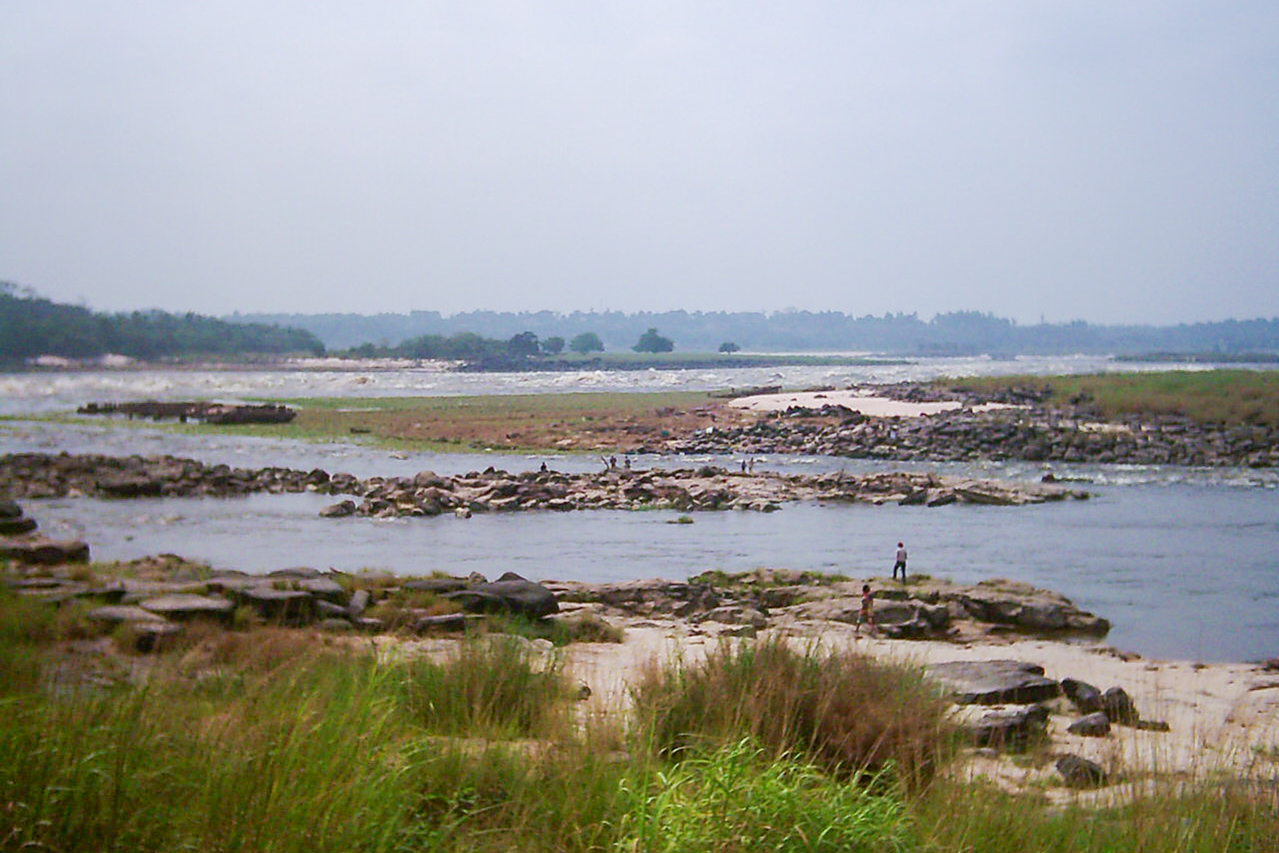
The beginning of the Livingstone Falls (Lower Congo Rapids) near Kinshasa

The current course of the Congo River formed between 1.5 and 2 million years BP, during the Pleistocene. It is likely that during this period many upper tributaries of the Congo were captured from adjacent river basins, including the Uele and upper Ubangi from the Chari system and the Chambeshi River alongside a number of upper Kasai River tributaries from the Zambezi system.

The Congo's formation may have led to the allopatric speciation of the bonobo and the common chimpanzee from their most recent common ancestor. The bonobo is endemic to the humid forests in the region, as are other iconic species like the Allen's swamp monkey, dryas monkey, aquatic genet, okapi, and Congo peafowl.

In terms of aquatic life, the Congo River Basin has a very high species richness and among the highest known densities of endemics. As of 2009, almost 800 fish species have been recorded from the Congo River Basin (not counting Lake Tanganyika, which is connected but ecologically very different), and large sections remain virtually unstudied. For example, the section in Salonga National Park, which is about the size of Belgium, had still not been sampled at all in 2006. New fish species are scientifically described with some regularity from the Congo River Basin, and many undescribed species are known.

The Congo has by far the highest diversity of any African river system; in comparison, the next richest are the Niger, Volta and Nile with about 240, 140 and 130 fish species, respectively. Because of the great ecological differences between the regions in the Congo basin—including habitats such as river rapids, deep rivers, swamps, and lakes—it is often divided into multiple ecoregions (instead of treating it as a single ecoregion). Among these ecoregions, the Livingstone Falls cataracts has more than 300 fish species, including approximately 80 endemics while the southwestern part (Kasai River basin) has more than 200 fish species, of which about a quarter are endemic.

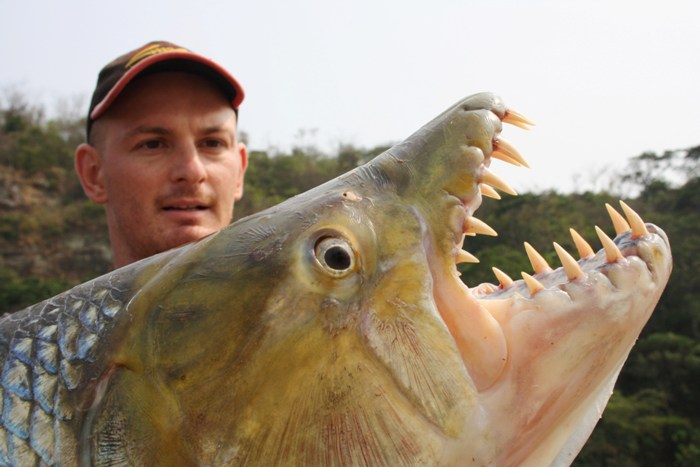
Giant tigerfish

The dominant fish families—at least in parts of the river—are Cyprinidae (carp/cyprinids, such as Labeo simpsoni), Mormyridae (elephant fishes), Alestidae (African tetras), Mochokidae (squeaker catfishes), and Cichlidae (cichlids). Among the natives in the river is the huge, highly carnivorous giant tigerfish. Three of the more unusual endemics are the whitish (non-pigmented) and blind Lamprologus lethops, which is believed to live as deep as 160 metres (520 ft) below the surface, Heterochromis multidens, which is more closely related to cichlids of the Americas than other African cichlids, and Caecobarbus geertsii, the only known cavefish in Central Africa. There are also numerous endemic frogs and snails. Several hydroelectric dams are planned on the river, and these may lead to the extinction of many of the endemics.

Several species of turtles and the slender-snouted, Nile and dwarf crocodile are native to the Congo River Basin. African manatees inhabit the lower parts of the river.

=== Flooding ===
The Democratic Republic of Congo (DRC) and Republic of Congo (RoC) have historically experienced recurrent flooding along the Congo River and its main tributaries during the rainy season, causing erosion and landslides, and negatively impacting human settlements, agriculture, and public health. The Congo River is expected to be increasingly impacted by climate change as temperatures rise and rainfall increases both in intensity and seasonal duration.

From October 2019 to January 2020, heavy rains affected 16 of the 26 provinces of the DRC and eight out of 12 departments of the RoC, leading to the 2019–2020 Congo River floods. The rains caused the overflow of the Congo River and Ubangi rivers, floods and landslides throughout the DRC and RoC and led to the displacement of hundreds of thousands of people.

== History ==
=== Pre-colonial history ===
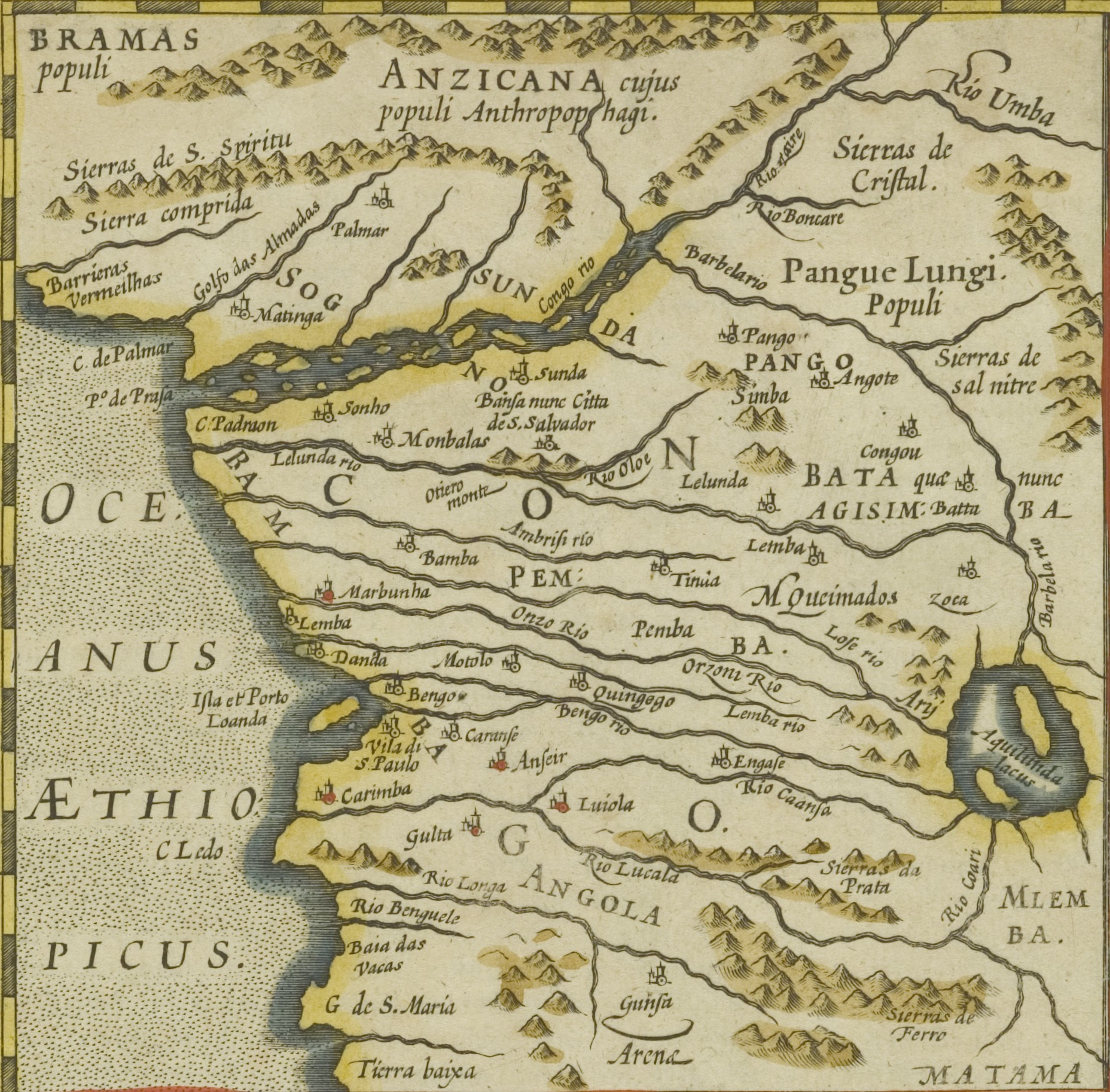
17th-century map of the Congo estuary

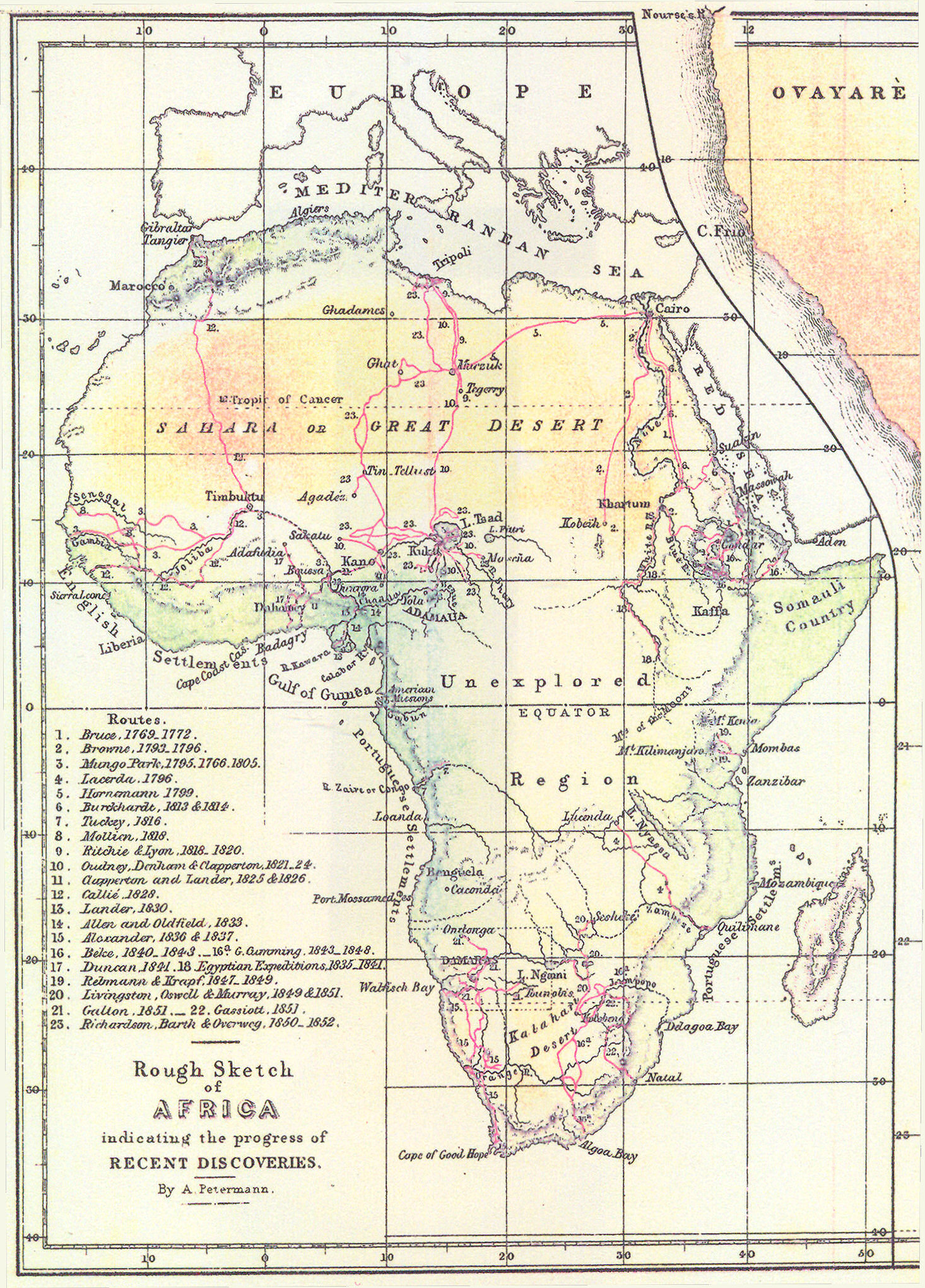
In this 1853 map of Africa, the remaining Unexplored Region essentially corresponds to the Congo basin

The entire Congo basin is populated by Bantu peoples, divided into several hundred ethnic groups. Bantu expansion is estimated to have reached the middle Congo by about 500 BC and the upper Congo by the first century AD. Remnants of the aboriginal population displaced by the Bantu migration, Pygmies/Abatwa of the Ubangian phylum, remain in the remote forest areas of the Congo Basin.

By the 13th century there were three main confederations of states in the western Congo Basin. In the east were the Seven Kingdoms of Kongo dia Nlaza, considered to be the oldest and most powerful, which likely included Nsundi, Mbata, Mpangu, and possibly Kundi and Okanga. South of these was Mpemba which stretched from modern-day Angola to the Congo River. It included various kingdoms such as Mpemba Kasi and Vunda. To its west across the Congo River was a confederation of three small states; Vungu (its leader), Kakongo, and Ngoyo.

The Kingdom of Kongo was formed in the late 14th century from a merging of the kingdoms of Mpemba Kasi and Mbata Kingdom on the left banks of the lower Congo River. Its territorial control along the river remained limited to what corresponds to the modern Kongo Central province. European exploration of the Congo began in 1482 when Portuguese explorer Diogo Cão discovered the river estuary (likely in August 1482), which he marked by a Padrão, or stone pillar (still existing, but only in fragments) erected on Shark Point. Cão sailed up the river for a short distance, establishing contact with the Kingdom of Kongo. The full course of the river remained unknown throughout the early modern period. (Note: The Dieppe maps of the mid-16th century show the Congo only as a minor river while having the Nile run throughout the continent, rising in Southern Africa. The same interpretation is in essence still found in Jan Blaeu's Atlas Maior of 1660. Jacques Bellin's map of the Congo in Histoire Generale Des Voyages by Antoine François Prévost (1754) shows awareness of the river reaching further inland, to the provinces of Sundi and Pango, but has no detailed knowledge of its course.)

The upper Congo basin runs west of the Albertine Rift. Its connection to the Congo was unknown until 1877. The extreme northeast of the Congo basin was reached by the Nilotic expansion at some point between the 15th and 18th centuries, by the ancestors of the Southern Luo speaking Alur people. Francisco de Lacerda followed the Zambezi and reached the uppermost part of the Congo basin (the Kazembe in the upper Luapula basin) in 1796.

The upper Congo River was first reached by the Arab slave trade by the 19th century. Nyangwe was founded as a slavers' outpost around 1860. David Livingstone was the first European to reach Nyangwe in March 1871. Livingstone proposed to prove that the Lualaba connected to the Nile, but on 15 July, he witnessed a massacre of about 400 Africans by Arab slavers in Nyangwe, which experience left him too horrified and shattered to continue his mission to find the sources of the Nile, so he turned back to Lake Tanganyika.

=== Early European colonization ===
The Europeans had not reached the central regions of the Congo basin from either the east or west, until Henry Morton Stanley's expedition of 1876–77, supported by the Committee for Studies of the Upper Congo. At the time one of the last open questions of the European exploration of Africa was whether the Lualaba River fed the Nile (Livingstone's theory), the Congo, or even the Niger River. Financed in 1874, Stanley's first trans-Africa exploration started in Zanzibar and reached the Lualaba on 17 October 1876. Overland he reached Nyangwe, the center of a lawless area containing cannibal tribes at which Tippu Tip based his trade in slaves. Stanley managed to hire a force from Tippu Tip to guard him for the next 150 kilometres (90 mi) or so, for 90 days.

The party left Nyangwe overland through the dense Matimba forest. On 19 November they reached the Lualaba again. Since the going through the forest was so heavy, Tippu Tip turned around with his party on 28 December, leaving Stanley on his own, with 143 people, including eight children and 16 women. They had 23 canoes. His first encounter with a local tribe was with the cannibal Wenya. In total Stanley reports 32 unfriendly meetings on the river, some violent, even though he attempted to negotiate a peaceful thoroughfare. But the tribes were wary as their only experience of outsiders was with slave traders.

On 6 January 1877, after 640 kilometres (400 mi), they reached Boyoma Falls (called Stanley Falls for some time after), consisting of seven cataracts spanning 100 kilometres (60 mi) which they had to bypass overland. It took them to 7 February to reach the end of the falls. Here Stanley learned that the river was called Ikuta Yacongo, proving to him that he had reached the Congo and that the Lualaba did not feed the Nile.

From this point, the tribes were no longer cannibals but possessed firearms, apparently as a result of Portuguese influence. Some four weeks and 1,900 kilometres (1,200 mi) later he reached Stanley Pool (now Pool Malebo), the site of the present day cities Kinshasa and Brazzaville. Further downstream were the Livingstone Falls, misnamed as Livingstone had never been on the Congo: a series of 32 falls and rapids with an elevation change of 270 metres (900 ft) over 350 kilometres (220 mi). On 15 March they started the descent of the falls, which took five months and cost numerous lives. From the Isangile Falls, five falls from the foot, they beached the canoes and Lady Alice and left the river, aiming for the Portuguese outpost of Boma via land.

On 3 August they reached the hamlet Nsada. From there Stanley sent four men with letters forward to Boma, asking for food for his starving people. On 7 August relief came, being sent by representatives from the Liverpool trading firm Hatton & Cookson. On 9 August they reached Boma, 1,001 days since leaving Zanzibar on 12 November 1874. The party then consisted of 108 people, including three children born during the trip. Most probably (Stanley's own publications give inconsistent figures), he lost 132 people through disease, hunger, drowning, killing and desertion.

Kinshasa was founded as a trading post by Stanley in 1881 and named Léopoldville in honor of Leopold II of Belgium. The Congo Basin was privately claimed by Leopold II as Congo Free State in 1885 where the many Atrocities in the Congo Free State were committed until the region was called the Belgian Congo.

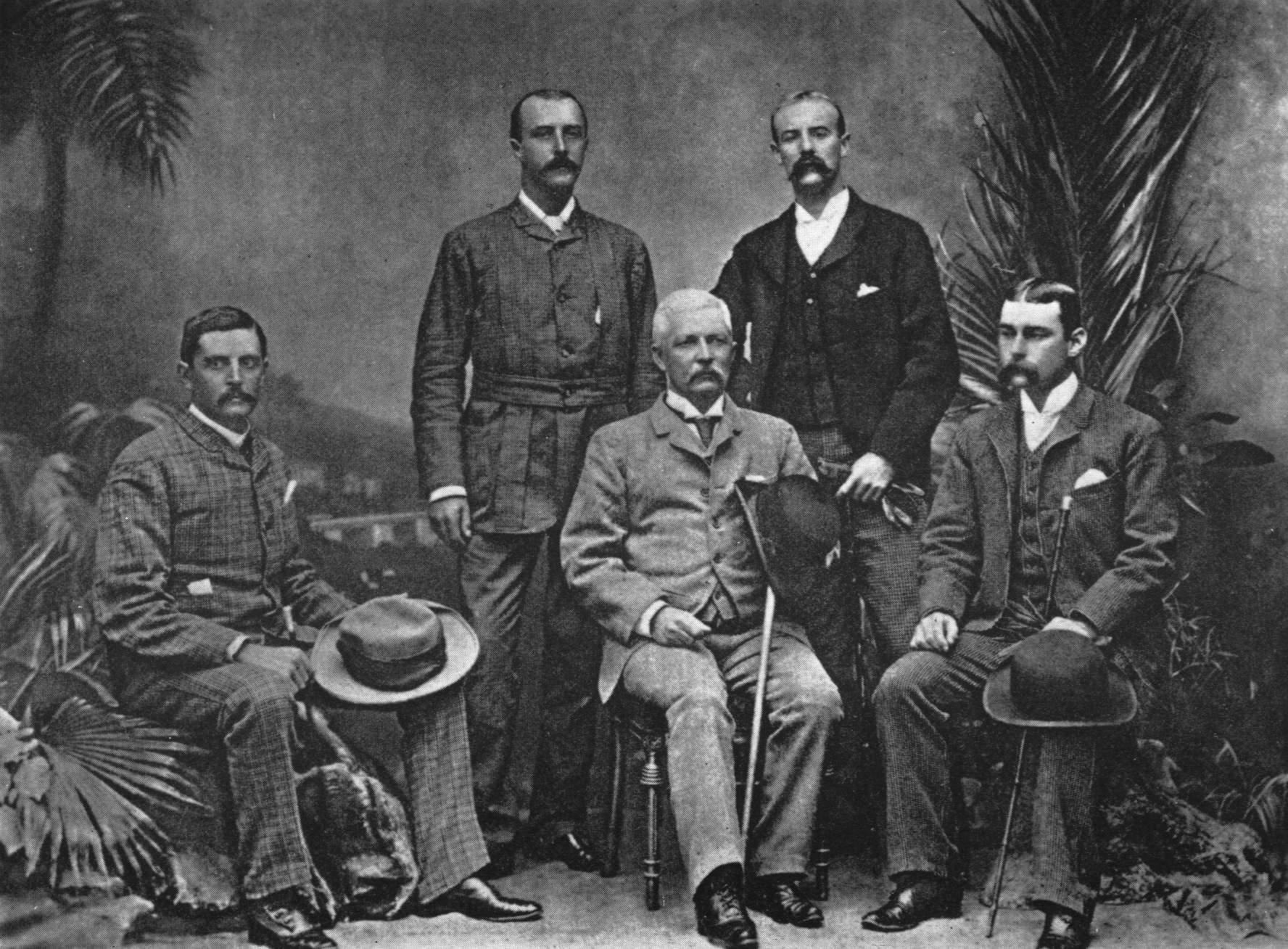
Henry M. Stanley with the officers of the Advance Column, Cairo, 1890. From the left: Dr. Thomas Heazle Parke, Robert H. Nelson, Henry M. Stanley, William G. Stairs, and Arthur J. M. Jephson

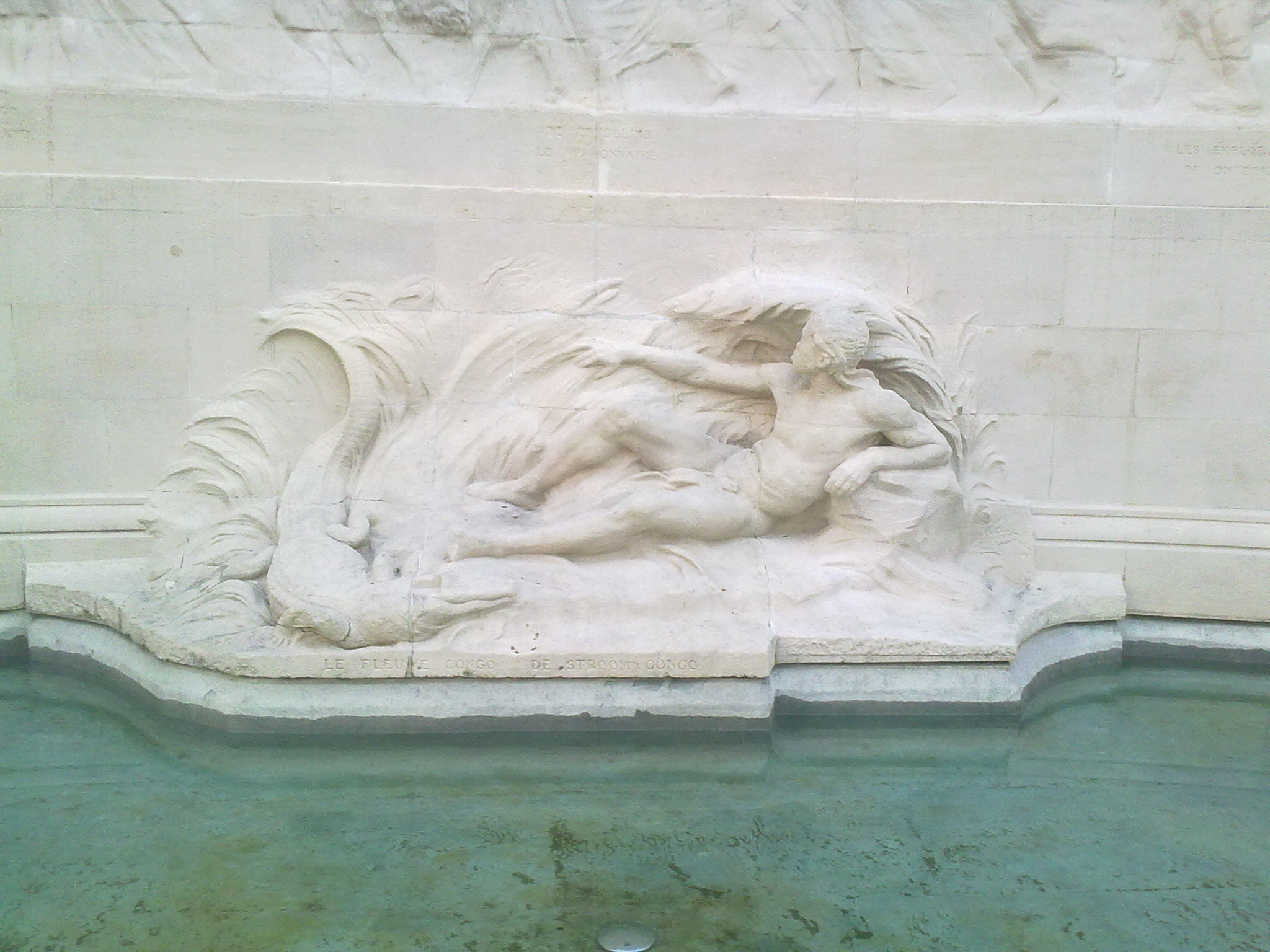
Congo River Allegory by Thomas Vinçotte.

== See also ==
- 2021 Congo River disaster
- List of crossings of the Congo River
- List of rivers of Africa
- List of rivers by discharge
- List of rivers by length

== General and cited sources ==
- Cana, Frank Richardson (1911). "Congo" . In Chisholm, Hugh (ed.). Encyclopædia Britannica. Vol. 6 (11th ed.). Cambridge University Press. pp. 914–917.
- Forbath, Peter (1979). The River Congo: The Discovery, Exploration and Exploitation of the World's Most Dramatic River. New York: E. P. Dutton. ISBN 0-525-47573-7.
- Jeal, Tim (2007). Stanley: The Impossible Life of Africa's Greatest Explorer. London: Faber & Faber. ISBN 978-0-571-22102-8.
