= Lubudi River =

Lubudi River may refer to the following rivers in the Democratic Republic of the Congo (DRC):

- Lubudi River (Lualaba tributary)
- Lubudi River (Sankuru tributary)
