= Lowa River =

Lowa River may refer to:

- Lowa (Kivu/Maniema), a tributary of the Lualaba in DR Congo in the Kivu and Maniema provinces
- Lowa (Katanga), a tributary of the Lualaba in DR Congo in the Katanga Province, better known as Luvua
