= Luachimo Hydroelectric Power Station =

Angolan power station

- Location within Angola
- Country: Angola
- Location: Luachimo
- Coordinates: 07°21′47″S 20°50′36″E
- Purpose: Power
- Status: Operational
- Opening date: 1957; 69 years ago
- Construction cost: US$212 million

Dam and spillways
- Impounds: Luachimo River

Ruacana Power Station
- Turbines: Francis-type; 4 x 8.5 MW (11,400 hp)
- Installed capacity: 34 MW (46,000 hp)

The Luachimo Hydroelectric Power Station is a hydroelectric power plant near Luachimo in northeast Angola, close to the border with the Democratic Republic of the Congo .

== Location ==
The power station is located across the Luachimo River, in the commune of Luachimo, in the Lunda Norte Province of Angola, adjacent to the international border with the Democratic Republic of the Congo. Luachimo is the location of the city of Dundo, approximately 1,123 kilometres (698 mi), by road, northeast of Luanda, the capital and largest city of Angola. The geographical coordinates of Luachimo Hydroelectric Power Station are:07°21'47.0"S, 20°50'36.0"E (Latitude:-7.363056; Longitude:20.843333).

== Overview ==
Construction of the original power station at this site, started in 1953. In 1957 the power station began operations with four turbines each rated at 2.1 megawatts for a total generation capacity of 8.4 megawatts (11,265 hp). The power station is owned and operated by Empresa Nacional de Diamantes de Angola.

== Rehabilitation and expansion ==
Plans to rehabilitate and expand this power station have been in the works since 2009, wen Emanuela Vieira Lopes, the country's minister of Energy, made those plans public.

In 2016 work began at the power station, to increase generation capacity from 8.4 megawatts to 34 megawatts. Each new turbine will have generation capacity of 8.5 megawatts. The power generated will supply the 186,000 people who live in Dundo City and surrounding neighborhoods. The renovations and upgrade to the power station cost US$212 million.

The renovated, expanded power station with generation capacity of 34 MW, was commercially commissioned on 17 May 2024. The engineering, procurement and construction contractor was China Gezhouba Group Corporation (CGGC).

== See also ==
- List of power stations in Angola
