= Djoué River =

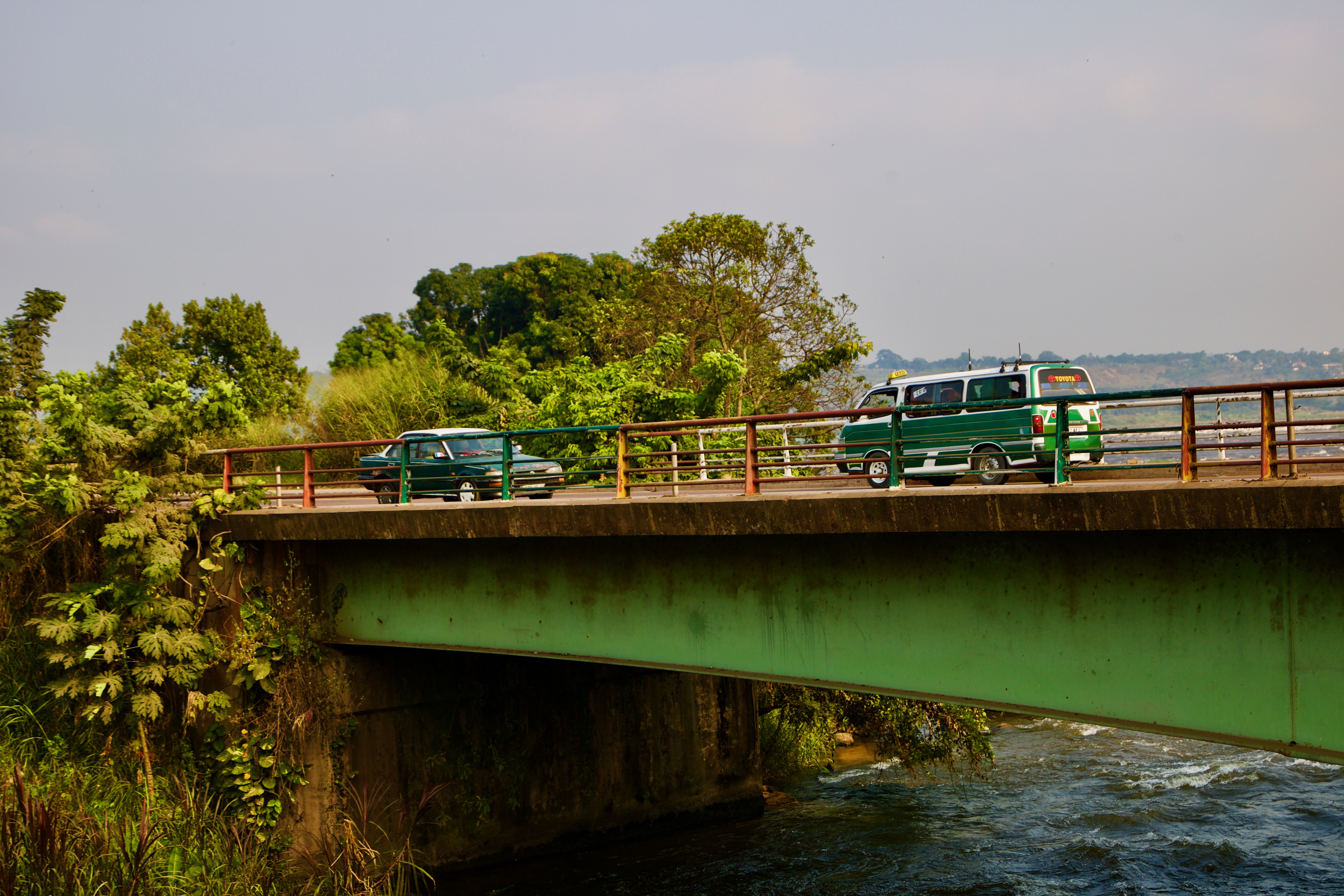
- Two taxis passing on the Djoué bridge over the Djoué river in Brazzaville at Pool

- Location within Republic of the Congo

Location
- Country: Republic of the Congo

Physical characteristics
- Mouth: Congo River
  - location: Brazzaville
  - coordinates: 4.310509°S 15.228197°E

Basin features
- Tributaries
  - right: Madzia

The Djoué River is a river of the Republic of the Congo. It is a right tributary of the Congo River.

== Course ==
The Djoué River rises in the Pool Department to the north of Mayama, and flows through that town. It then follows a meandering southeast course through Ngoma-Tsétse in the Brazzaville Department and through the west of the city of Brazzaville, entering the Congo where it leaves the Pool Malebo. The river flows through the Kintamo Rapids at its mouth, described by the English explorer Henry Morton Stanley on 12 March 1877 as having an impressive beauty rarely equaled.

== Ramsar site ==
At its mouth the river flows through the 2,500 hectares (6,200 acres) Ramsar site no.1857, Les Rapides du Congo-Djoué. It includes rapids, permanent and temporary rivers, marshes, forested islands and aquaculture ponds. There are three forested islands in the site. One of them, the Île du Diable, is a refuge for many birds. The waterways support fish and invertebrates, and is a spawning ground. Although protected by law, there is no management plan in place, and the site is used for market gardening, fishing and harvesting of wine palm oil.

== Water quality ==
An analysis of the water for the purpose of determining treatment needed to make it potable found an acceptable pH 7.5, but turbidity of 15 NTU: the water is very muddy. The water is soft, and has low levels of inorganic pollutants other than phosphate ions. It could be disinfected with calcium hypochlorite and clarified with calcium sulfate and lime.

== Hydroelectricity ==
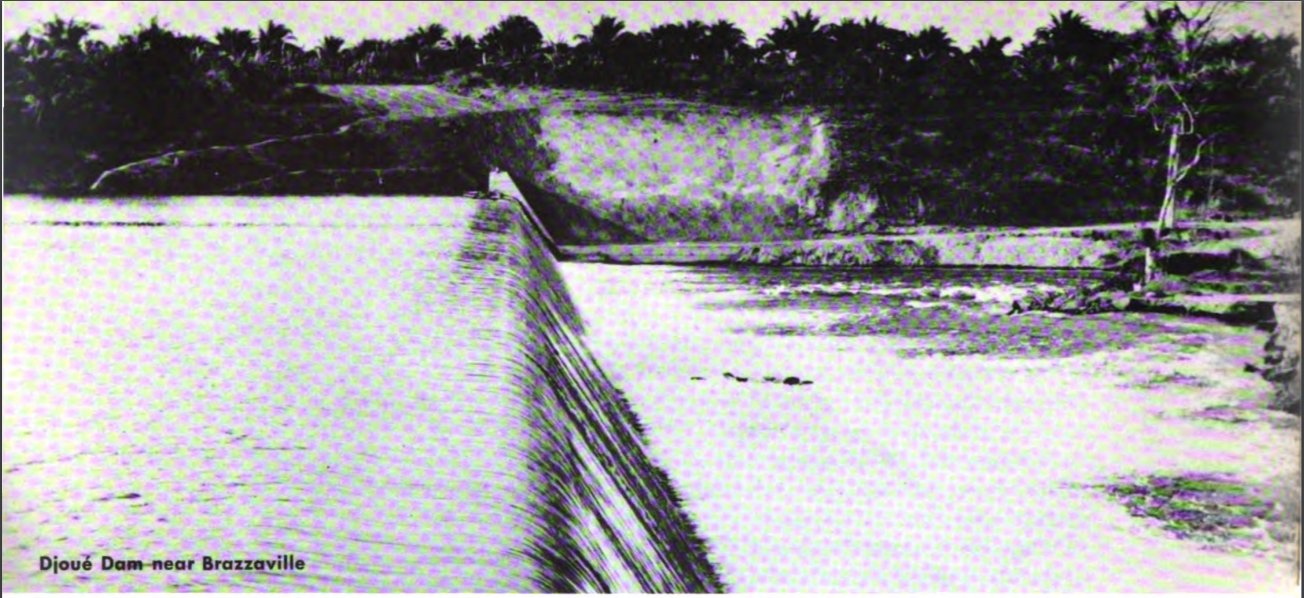
Image of the Djoue Dam

There is a gravity dam with a 24 metres (79 ft) head and hydroelectric power plant on the river less than 10 kilometres (6.2 mi) from the city center, built in the 1950s. In March 2013 Andritz Hydro Switzerland was awarded a contract to rehabilitate and upgrade HPP Djoué. The power plant had been out of operation since April 2007, when the control room was flooded, and the tailrace channel had been completely silted up by the biannual floods of the Congo River. The renovated plant would supply 2 x 9.06MW.

== Sources ==
- Andzi Barhé, T.; Safou Tchiama, Rodrigue; Bouaka, Fulbert (July 2013), "Physicochemical Characterization, Chlorination and Flocculation of Waters of the River Djoue (Congo-Brazzaville)", International Journal of Green and Herbal Chemistry, 2 (3), Marien Ngouabi University: 618–630, ISSN 2278-3229
- Djoué - Clean energy for green Brazzaville, Republic of Congo, Andritz
- Les Rapides du Congo-Djoué, Ramsar Sites Information Service
- "Monuments", Brazzaville.cg
- "Relation: Djoué (1197781)", OpenStreetMap
