= M'pozo River =

River in Democratic Republic of the Congo

Coordinates: 5.81139°S 13.4833°E

The M'pozo (French: Rivière M'pozo) is a river in the province of Bas-Congo in the Democratic Republic of the Congo. Its source is located in Angola and it forms part of the Angola–Democratic Republic of the Congo border. The river ends on the left bank of the Congo River, a few kilometres upstream of Matadi.

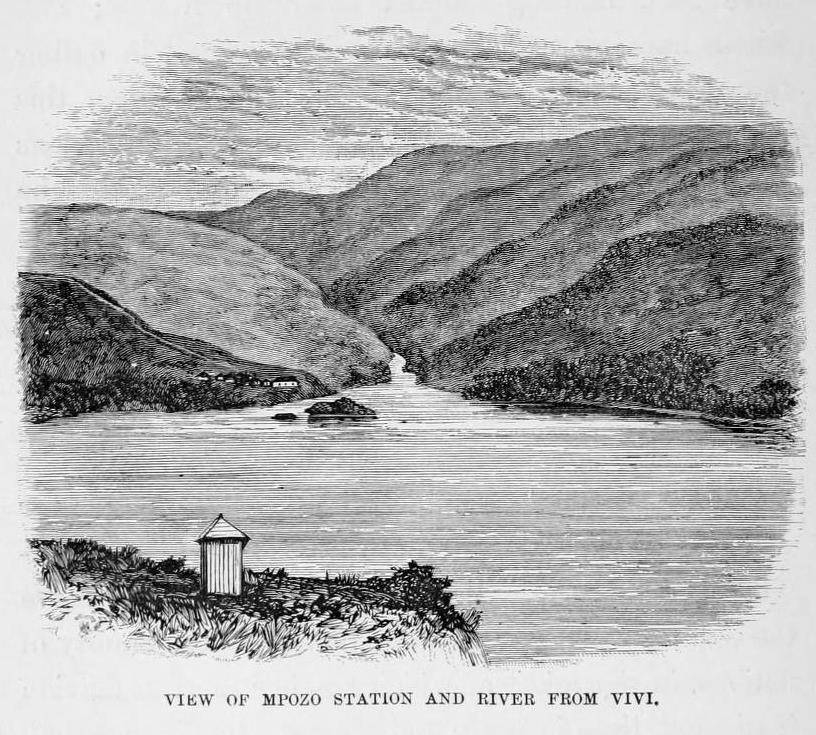
A drawing from Henry Morton Stanley's 1885 book The Congo and the founding of its free state; a story of work and exploration

The river is especially known for the lower part of its course and for its canyon, which is used by the Matadi–Kinshasa Railway, and which constituted the principal difficulty during the construction of this railway line at the end of the 19th century.

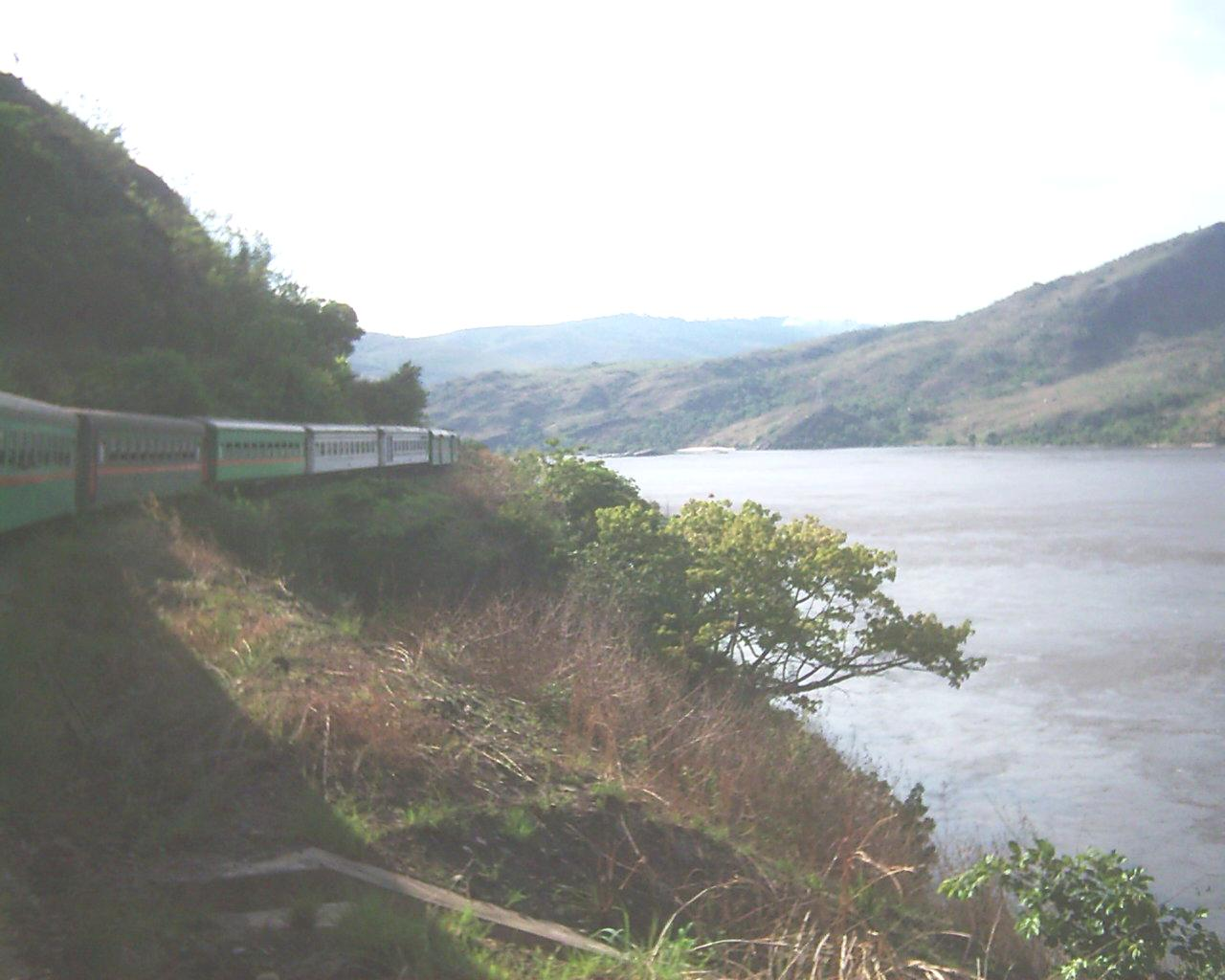
The M'pozo River near the Matadi railway station
