= Luachimo =

- commune
- Country: Angola
- Province: Lunda Norte

Area
  - Total: 1,510 sq mi (3,920 km^{2})

Population (2014 census)
  - Total: 189,231
  - Density: 125/sq mi (48.3/km^{2})
- Time zone: UTC+1 (WAT)

Luachimo is a commune of Angola, located in the province of Lunda Norte. The city of Dundo is located in the commune.

== See also ==
- Communes of Angola
