= Ikelemba River =

River in Democratic Republic of the Congo

- Mouth location in the Democratic Republic of the Congo

Location
- Country: Democratic Republic of the Congo

Physical characteristics
- Mouth: Congo River
  - coordinates: 0.1102°N 18.2768°E

Basin features
- River system: Congo River

The Ikelemba River (Swahili: Mto Ikelemba) is a river in the Democratic Republic of the Congo. It is a left tributary of the Congo River.

== Location ==
The Ikelemba River flows in an arc from east to west. It is navigable for 137 kilometres (85 mi) from Bombimba to where it enters the Congo River. It joins the Congo from the east just north of where the Ruki River enters the Congo River. The Lulonga, Ikelemba and Busira all contribute to the Mbandaka flooded forests, which cover a permanently flooded area of 10,415 square kilometres (4,021 sq mi).

== Colonial period ==
The explorer Henry Morton Stanley visited the region. He wrote that the Ikelemba entered the Congo about 30 miles (48 km) above the Mohindu or Buruki River (Ruki River). (Note: A modern map shows the Ikelemba entering the Congo about 2 miles (3.2 km) north of the mouth of the Ruki. However, the map also shows that the river meanders down from the north parallel to the Congo through swampy country. The course near the mouth may have shifted since Stanley's time.) He estimated it would provide 125 miles (201 km) of river course accessible to trade, and said it was the commercial reserve of the Bakuti tribe. The river was about 150 yards (140 m) wide, and had black waters. Stanley speculated that the Ikelemba, Lulungu (Lulonga River) and Mohindu might be connected by a system of channels running through a low jungly forest.

The Ikelemba company was founded in the Congo Free State on 29 October 1898 to exploit the Ikelemba River, with a capital of 500,000 francs. In the first two years the comnpany harvested about 5 tonnes of rubber each month, and cleared 50 hectares (120 acres) to plant coffee, cocoa and rubber trees. After this results were poorer, and the company suffered from the fall in rubber prices. In 1910 all of the company's assets were transferred to the newly formed Société Equatoriale Congolaise Lulonga-Ikelemba.

== Sources ==
- Kisangani, Emizet Francois (2016-11-18), Historical Dictionary of the Democratic Republic of the Congo, Rowman & Littlefield Publishers, ISBN 978-1-4422-7316-0
- "L'Ikelemba S.A.", Ray-Scripophile.be
- Stanley, Henry Morton (2011-08-25), The Congo and the Founding of Its Free State: A Story of Work and Exploration, Cambridge University Press, ISBN 978-1-108-03132-5
- "Way: Ikelemba (12078535)", OpenStreetMap
- "Zaire (Contd.)", Source book for the inland fishery resources of Africa, vol. 1, FAO
