= Lowa (Kivu/Maniema) =

River in Democratic Republic of the Congo

Coordinates: 1.406°S 25.812°E

Lowa (Swahili: Mto Lowa) is a river in the Congo Basin in northeastern Democratic Republic of the Congo.

It rises in the Mitumba Mountains, on the border of the provinces of South Kivu and North Kivu. It flows westward through the Albertine Rift montane forests and Northeastern Congolian lowland forests of North Kivu and in turn Maniema. It flows into the Lualaba at the border of Maniema and Tshopo.

The first European to trace its length was Gustav Adolf von Götzen in his expedition that started in 1893. Its length is 390 kilometres (240 mi).

The river basin includes the Kahuzi-Biéga National Park and the Maiko National Park.
