= Lubudi River (Sankuru tributary) =

River in Democratic Republic of the Congo

Coordinates: 4°02′19″S 21°22′48″E

The Lubudi River (or Labody; French: Rivière Lubudi) is a tributary of the Sankuru River in the Democratic Republic of the Congo (DRC). The mouth of the river is in the Kuba Chiefdom of the Mweka Territory in Kasai Province.

== History ==
In 1910 the Belgians finally took control of the Kuba kingdom. The vice-Governor Eugène Henry delimited the new Kuba "chiefdom" narrowly, excluding the villages to the east of the Lubudi. The villagers did not accept the change and continued to pay tribute to the Kuba capital. After Kwet Mabine came to power as the Kuba King, he made a formal tour in 1925 that included the Ngongo chiefdoms and their main town of Misumba. The chiefs accepted his authority.

== Sources ==
- Vansina, Jan (2010). Being colonized: the Kuba experience in rural Congo, 1880-1960. Univ of Wisconsin Press. ISBN 978-0-299-23644-1.
