= Lubudi River (Lualaba tributary) =

River in Democratic Republic of the Congo

- Upper Lualaba and tributaries, Lubudi to the west

Location
- Country: Democratic Republic of the Congo

Physical characteristics
- Source
  - coordinates: 11.259562°S 24.634781°E
- Mouth
  - coordinates: 9.209925°S 25.623336°E

The Lubudi River (Swahili: Mto Lubudi) is a tributary of the Lualaba River in the Democratic Republic of the Congo (DRC). The Lubudi rises near the Zambian border southwest of Kolwezi. It flows north and northeast to join the Lualaba from the left where the southern Katanga plateau drops into the Upemba Depression, near Bukama.

== History ==
Around 1800 the copper mines on the Lubudi river were part of the Lunda Empire. The people delivered copper to the Emperor ("Mwant Yav") as tribute, but also sold copper bars in exchange for food such as dried fish and manioc flour. In the early nineteenth century the villagers on the upper Lubudi were subject to the Mushima chief, an ally of the king of Samba.

== Sources ==
- Higginson, John (1989). A working class in the making: Belgian colonial labor policy, private enterprise, and the African mineworker, 1907-1951. Univ of Wisconsin Press. ISBN 0-299-12070-8.
- Reefe, Thomas Q. (1981). The rainbow and the kings: a history of the Luba Empire to 1891. University of California Press. ISBN 0-520-04140-2.
- von Oppen, Achim (1994). Terms of trade and terms of trust: the history and contexts of pre-colonial market production around the Upper Zambezi and Kasai. LIT Verlag Münster. ISBN 3-89473-246-6.
