= Dungu =

Dungu may refer to:

- Dungu, Democratic Republic of the Congo, a town in Haut-Uélé Province
- Dungu language, found in Kaduna State, Nigeria
- Gheorghe Dungu (1929-2023), a Romanian footballer
- Pjetër Dungu (1908-1989), an Albanian musician
- Dungu, Ghana, a suburb in Tamale Metropolitan District in the Northern Region of Ghana
- Dungu River (Democratic Republic of the Congo)
