= Makongo =

- Location within Democratic Republic of the Congo
- Coordinates: 3.2457°N 26.3627°E
- Country: Democratic Republic of the Congo
- Province: Bas-Uélé
- Territory: Bambesa Territory
- Area codes: for multiple area codes

Makongo (or Bakongo, Bakongoi, Bakongai etc.) is a settlement in the Bas-Uélé province of the Democratic Republic of the Congo.

== Location ==
Makongo is in Bambesa Territory, Bas-Uélé province. It is on the Makongo River, a tributary of the Bomokandi River, which in turn is a tributary of the Uele River.

== Historical ==
The Italian explorer Giovanni Miani Mangià arrive in Bakongoi on 3 July 1872. At this point his escort refused to go further. Miani stayed at Bakangoi until 16 September 1872. The sultan was greatly pleased with a present of a looking glass, and told him much about the lands to the south and west. Based on interviews with the sultan and his subjects Miani drew a sketch map of the region.

== Sources ==
- "Node: Makongo (174630713)", OpenStreetMap
- Surdich, Franceso (2010), "Miani, Giovanni", Dizionario biografico degli italiani, vol. 74, pp. 100–104
- "The Welle River", The Geographical Magazine, Trübner, 1878
