= Duru River =

River in Democratic Republic of the Congo

- Location within Democratic Republic of the Congo

Location
- Country: Democratic Republic of the Congo
- Province: Haut-Uélé

Physical characteristics
- Source
  - coordinates: 4.3398°N 29.2260°E
- Mouth: Uele River
  - coordinates: 3.7497°N 28.04533°E

The Duru River is a river of the Haut-Uélé province of the Democratic Republic of the Congo. It is a right tributary of the Uele River.

== Course ==
The river rises on the border with South Sudan (the Congo-Nile Divide) in the Réserve de chasse d'Azande and flows southwest to enter the Uele upstream from Niangara. Duru village is beside the river on the boundary of the Réserve de chasse d'Azande at 4.2450°N 28.7525°E. It is on the road leading from Dungu north to Yambio in South Sudan.

== Indigenous people ==
The Avaduru, a Bakango group, may take their name from the Duru River. The Amiengba and Abogoru lived along the Duru or its tributaries. S. H. F. Capenny wrote that the Abangba were found in the Duru basin. The Duga-Botungba were living at Ukwa (4.2480°N 29.2145°E) on the Duru in 1953.

== Colonial presence ==
Georg August Schweinfurth (1836–1925) camped on 18 April 1870 on the right shore of the Uele, which he called the "Kibali", at a place named "Kassanga". Léon Lotar (1877–1943) identifies this with the rapids around the mouth of the Duru.

== Lord's Resistance Army ==
A joint patrol of soldiers of the Armed Forces of the Democratic Republic of the Congo (FARDC) of the United Nations Mission in the Democratic Republic of Congo (MONUC) was sent to Duru on 6 February 2010. Civilians armed with machetes blocked the road from Bitima to Duru with tree trunks and threw stones at the patrol, but the situation was quickly defused. On 10 February 2010 FARDC soldiers attacked a Lord's Resistance Army (LRA) camp near the mouth of the Duru River and released six children. As part of the "Welcome to Peace" joint operation of FARDC and MONUSCO, on 12 April 2012 the operational post of the MONUSCO Force in Duru village carried out intensive patrols in the riparian areas of the Duru River to arrange the voluntary surrender of elements of the Lord's Resistance Army who had said they would surrender.

== Sources ==
- Conférence de presse des Nations Unies du mercredi 18 avril 2012 (in French), MONUSCO, 22 April 2012
- Costermans, B. J. (1953), Mosaïque Bangba - Notes pour servir à l’étude des Peuplades de l’Uele (PDF) (in French), Brussels: Institut Royal Colonial Belge
- Conference De Presse Monuc Mercredi 17 Fevrier 2010 (in French), MONUC
- "Node: Duru (1157841700)", OpenStreetMap
