= Bima River =

River in Democratic Republic of the Congo

- Location within Democratic Republic of the Congo

Location
- Country: Democratic Republic of the Congo

Physical characteristics
- Mouth: Uele River
  - coordinates: 3.385321°N 25.140817°E

The Bima River is a river of Bas-Uélé province in the Democratic Republic of the Congo. It is a left tributary of the Uele River.

== Course ==
The Bima flows through the Poko, Bambesa and Buta territories and enters the Uele River near Malengweya. The Bima is among the most important of the tributaries of the Uele, the others being the Uere River and the Bomokandi River. The Andu River is a large right tributary of the Bima. The Bana River is another tributary.

In 1955 the west boundary of the Bambesa Territory was defined in part by the Bima from its confluence with the Uele up to its confluence with the Andu, and then along the Bima to its intersection with the Bondo-Mungbere railway. Diamonds have been found in association with gold in the upper part of the Bima.

== Colonial era ==
Around November 1890 the Zanzibar Arab Mirambo arrived in the Uele region, starting from a point on the Aruwimi River upstream from Yambuya. Passing the Rubi River he went NNE through Bagbwe and Bayo territory, and installed himself on the Bima near the Titulé post, having obtained the submission of the Bayo people, who supplied auxiliaries to attack the neighbouring people. He threatened the posts in the neighbouring state of Djabar from his base on the Bima. On 13 December 1890 Jules Alexandre Milz and Alphonse Vangèle took a position nearby. Mirambo attacked and was decisively defeated and forced to flee. In late October 1891 the Ababua chief Sikito defeated the trader Purukandu on the route from the Falls to the Makongo River. According to Gustave Gustin the meeting must have taken place on the upper Bima in mountainous terrain.

== Sources ==
- Omasombo Tshonda, Jean (2014), Bas-Uele Pouvoirs locaux et économie agricole : héritages d’un passé brouillé (PDF) (in French), Musée royal de l’Afrique centrale, ISBN 978-9-4916-1586-3
- "Way: Bima (162842466)", OpenStreetMap
