= Dungu-Uye Airport =

- IATA: none; ICAO: FZJC

Summary
- Serves: Dungu, Democratic Republic of the Congo
- Elevation AMSL: 2,378 ft / 725 m
- Coordinates: 3°35′52″N 028°34′35″E

Map
- Location of airport in the Democratic Republic of the Congo

Runways
Direction	Length		Surface
Direction	m	ft	Surface
10/28	995	3,264	Grass
- Source: Google Maps GCM

Dungu-Uye Airport (ICAO: FZJC) is an airport serving the Kibali River town of Dungu in Haut-Uélé Province, Democratic Republic of the Congo. The airport is just south of the river.

== See also ==
- Transport in the Democratic Republic of the Congo
- List of airports in the Democratic Republic of the Congo
