= Panayotis Potagos =

Greek physician and explorer

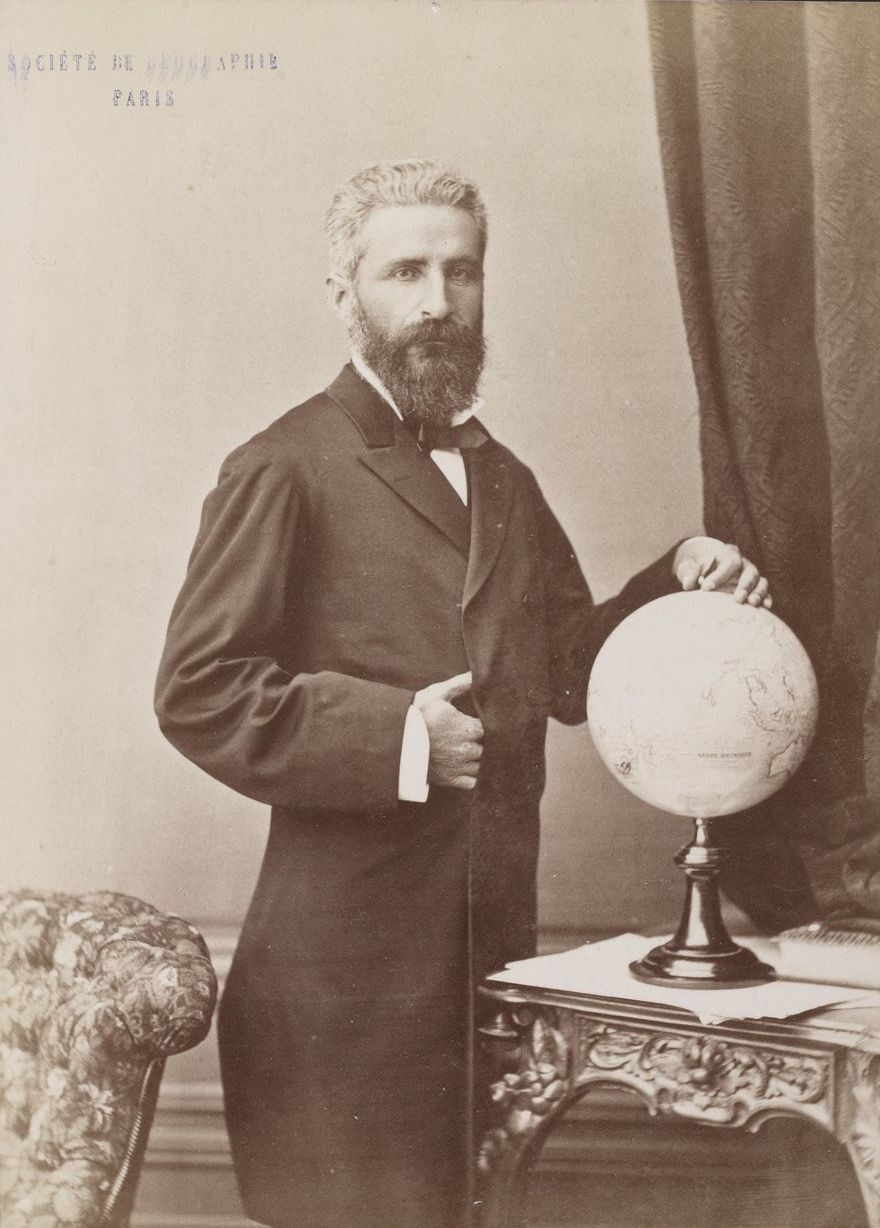
Panayotis Potagos with a globe

Panayotis or Panagiotis Potagos (Greek: Παναγιώτης Ποταγός; 1838 – 1903) was a Greek physician and explorer born in Vytina. Potagos began his travels in 1867, visiting Iraq, Iran, Afghanistan, Gobi Desert, and India. He arrived in Egypt in 1876, ascending the Nile River to southern Sudan and then crossed the Congo-Nile Divide into the Congo River basin through what is now the Central African Republic and finally reached the Uele River in 1877. He was the first European to reach the Mbomou and Uele rivers from the north. He published an account of his travels, which was translated into French.

He died in the village of Nymfes, Corfu.

== Works ==
- Perílipsis Periigíseon Περίληψις Περιηγήσεων [A Summary of My Travels] (in Greek), Athens, 1883.
- Dix Années de Voyages dans l'Asie Centrale et l'Afrique Équatoriale [Ten Years of Travels in Central Asia and Equatorial Africa] (in French), Paris, 1885.
- "Le Pamir, Juin 1870" [The Pamir, June 1870], Bulletin Soc. Géogr. (in French), vol. 7, Paris, 1886, pp. 281–319.
