= Makere people =

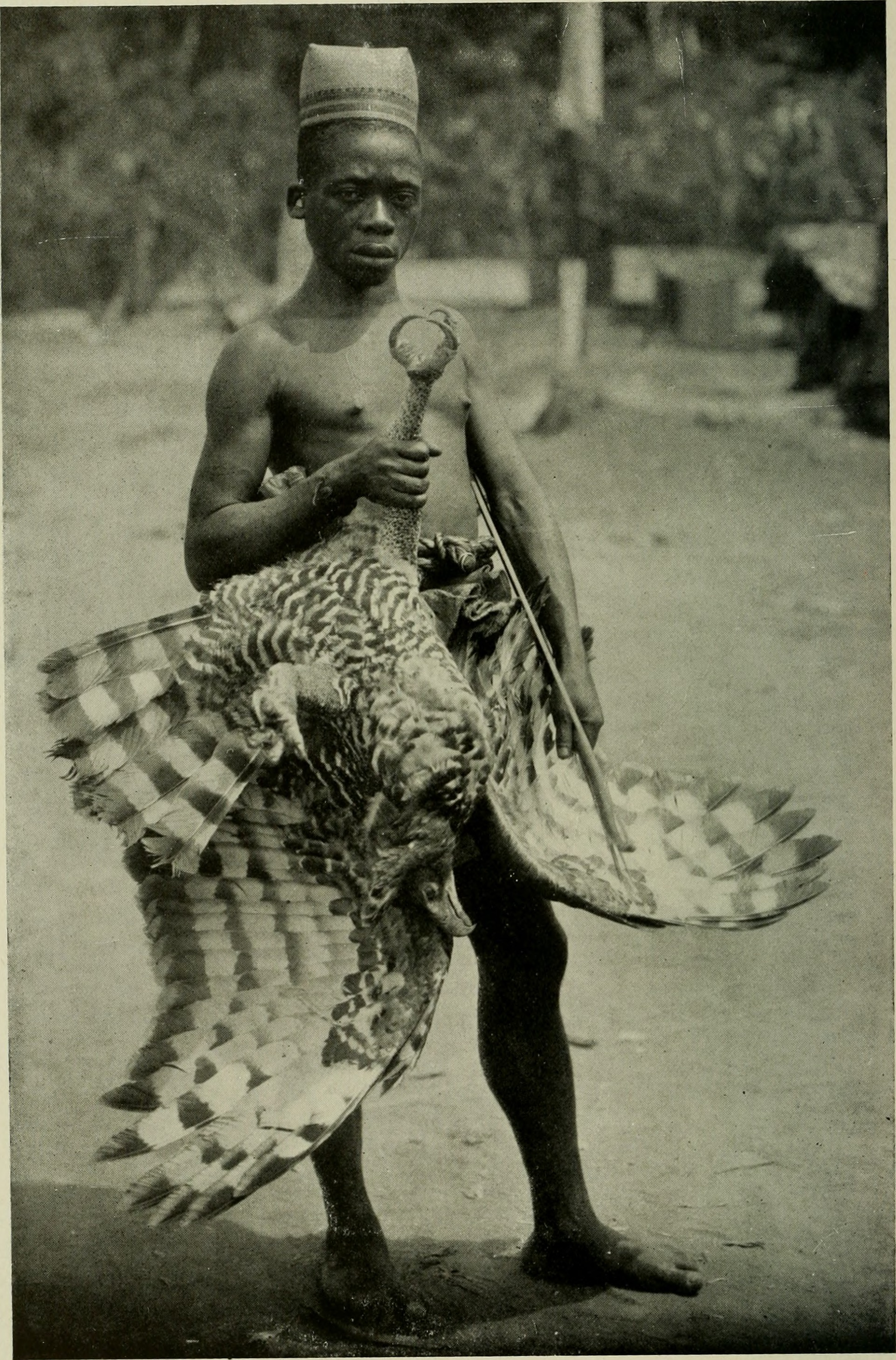
A Makere man with an eagle in the early 1900s

The Makere are an ethnic group of the Democratic Republic of the Congo, living near the Bima River in the Northern part of the country. They speak the Mangbetu language.
