= Makongo River =

- Location within Democratic Republic of the Congo

Location
- Country: Democratic Republic of the Congo
- Province: Bas-Uélé

Physical characteristics
- Mouth: Bomokandi River
  - coordinates: 3.436162°N 26.346555°E

Basin features
- River system: Uele River

The Makongo River (French: Rivière Makongo) is a river of the Democratic Republic of the Congo. It is a left tributary of the Bomokandi River, which in turn is a tributary of the Uele River.

== Course ==
The Makongo flows through the province of Bas-Uélé in a generally NNE direction to its confluence with the Bomokandi. The river rises to the south of the RP415 road. It roughly defines the boundary between the Ganga Dingila Health Zone to the west and the Poko Health Zone to the east. It passes the village of Makongo on its left bank. It enters the Bomokandi to the northwest of Digili. It flows through the Bambesa Territory.

== History ==
The oral history of the Lika people of Wamba Territory states that they came from Bambili (Boa). During their migration some of them stayed beside the Makongo River in the eastern part of Poko Territory, at least 200 kilometres (120 mi) from the area they occupy today.

The Congo-Nile Expedition of Willem Frans Van Kerckhoven passed through the region in 1891. Captain Pierre Ponthier had to clear the country of Arabs. They had settled on the Makongo and on islands in the Bomokandi. He defeated them in some sharp engagements, helped by local people who could no longer tolerate the slavers. In late October 1891 the Ababua chief Sikito defeated the trader Purukandu on the route from the Boyoma Falls to the Makongo. According to Gustave Gustin the meeting must have taken place on the upper Bima River in mountainous terrain.

== Sources ==
- Bas-Uélé - Carte Santaire et Base Map (PDF) (map), Medecins Sans Frontieres, 16 December 2019
- Gambier, R. (26 November 1947), "KERCKHOVEN (VAN) (Guillaume François)", Biographie Coloniale Belge (in French), vol. I, Inst. roy. colon. belge, pp. col. 566-573
- Omasombo Tshonda, Jean (2014), Bas-Uele Pouvoirs locaux et économie agricole : héritages d’un passé brouillé (PDF) (in French), Musée royal de l’Afrique centrale, ISBN 978-9-4916-1586-3
- "Relation: Makongo (1665163)", OpenStreetMap
- "Territoire de Bambesa", Cellule d'Analyses des Indicateurs de Développement (CAID)
