= Bambesa Territory =

Bambesa
- Territory
- Interactive map of Bambesa
- Coordinates: 3.4°N 25.7°E
- Country: DR Congo
- Province: Bas-Uele
- Seat: Bambesa

Area
  - Total: 9,130 km^{2} (3,530 sq mi)

Population (2016)
  - Total: 209,297
  - Density: 22.9/km^{2} (59.4/sq mi)
- Time zone: UTC+2 (CAT)

Bambesa is a territory of the province of Bas-Uele resulting from the dismemberment of the former Orientale (Eastern) province. Its administrative center is the town of Bambesa.

Settlements include the town of Makongo on the Makongo River and Zobia on the Bima River.

In the surroundings around Bambesa, mainly green-green deciduous forest grows. Around Bambesa, it is sparsely populated, with 17 inhabitants per square kilometer. Tropical monsoon climate prevails in the area. Annual average temperature in the funnel is 21 °C. The warmest month is June, when the average temperature is 22 °C, and the coldest is July, at 20 °C. Average annual rainfall is 1,716 millimeters. The rainy month is August, with an average of 252 mm rainfall, and the driest is January, with 28 mm rainfall.

== Location ==
The smallest territory of Bas-Uele. It has an area of 9,130 km^{2} (3,530 sq mi). It is bordered:

- to the north: by the territories of Ango and Bondo;
- to the east: by the territory of Poko
- to the west: by the territory of Buta
- to the south: by the territory of Banalia in the province of Tshopo
