= Ironstone Plateau =

- Plateau
- Coordinates: 5°58′N 27°23′E
- Location: South Sudan
- Elevation: 910 m (3,000 ft)

The Ironstone Plateau (jabal hadid) is a region in the south and west of South Sudan.

== Topology and rainfall ==
The land in the south and west of South Sudan slopes down to the northeast from the Nile-Congo Divide towards the Bahr el Ghazal swamps. The divide is formed by a plateau rising 800 to 1,000 metres (2,600 to 3,300 ft) above sea level, with some peaks that rise to 1,700 metres (5,600 ft). Rainfall is higher on the plateau than in the lower clay floodplains. The rainy season lasts from May until November. Annual rainfall is 700 to 900 millimetres (28 to 35 in). The plateau drains into the floodplain through rivers that cross an ironstone peneplain and then spread out into deltas and swamps. The soils of the plateau have little capacity to hold water, so most of the run-off drains into the floodlands. The many streams draining the plateau have formed steep and narrow valleys.

== Soil and vegetation ==
The Ironstone Plateau takes its name from the hard red lateritic soil called ironstone that covers almost the entire area. These soils are often thin and may be unsuitable for agriculture, except in the Green Belt in the extreme southwest of Western Equatoria and in a region around the Acholi Mountains in the Torit County of Eastern Equatoria. The country north and east of the ironstone plateau is covered in clayish black cotton soil, mostly grasslands that are prone to flooding. The black cotton soil cracks when it is dry, but expands and becomes sticky in the rain, making travel difficult. The ironstone plateau has more trees and travel is easier. The plateau and peneplain are mostly wooded.

== People and economy ==
The people of the plateau generally speak Ubangian languages while the people of the floodplains are Nilotic. The plateau population includes Zande in Western Equatoria and Bari speakers in Central Equatoria on either side of the Nile. They raise some livestock and engage in rain-fed agriculture, growing cereals such as Sorghum and pearl millet, vegetables and cassava in mixed croppings. Other crops are oil seeds, groundnuts, sesame, cowpeas and okra, and mangoes, citrus and melons. The best soil for agriculture is beside the streams that drain the plateau. The forests yield mahogany from the Raga region and plantation teak.
