= Andrea Debono =

Maltese trader and explorer

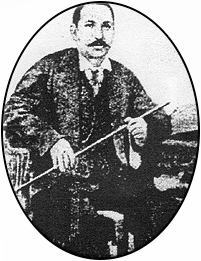
- Born: 7 November 1821; Senglea, Malta
- Died: 29 October 1871 (aged 49); Cairo, Egypt
- Occupation: Trader
- Spouse: Victoria Debono
- Children: 3
- Parents: Michael Debono (father); Teresa née Carabott (mother)

Andrea Debono (7 November 1821 – 29 October 1871), also known as Latif Effendi, was a Maltese trader and explorer who was one of the first Europeans to explore the area around the White Nile in the mid-19th century.

== Biography ==
Debono was born on 7 November 1821 in Senglea, Malta. He was the son of Michael Debono, a captain of the merchant navy, and his wife Teresa née Carabott. He had a twin sister named Battistina. During his youth, Debono studied medicine and chemistry.

The Debono family later emigrated to Alexandria in Egypt, and Andrea Debono worked in a hospital. Andrea and Battistina moved to Cairo after their parents died, and later to Khartoum in the Sudan in 1848, where Andrea built a corn mill and was involved in the production of building materials. Debono married Victoria, an Abyssinian, and they had three children but two of them died in infancy.

In 1851, Debono began to serve the Egyptian Governor of Sudan and adopted the name of Latif Effendi. He made significant profits from the ivory trade, and he employed around 400 men as porters or boatmen. At this point he also began exploring the Nile, and he was the first European to explore the Sobat River tributary of the White Nile, reaching the cataracts beyond Gondokoro. He reached the Djiamoudj rapids in April 1853, acquiring knowledge of Lake Albert and the Semliki River. He made a 300-mile-long (480 km) journey to the mouth of the Sobat in 1854–1855 together with his wife, his son and later his agent Philippe Terranuova. At one point, their boats were grounded for six months due to the dry season and they were threatened by hostile natives.

Between 1855 and 1856, Debono was the British Consular Agent in Khartoum. In 1859 he explored Gondokoro once again, publishing a book about his travels three years later. He was accompanied by the Italian explorer Giovanni Miani Samuel Baker wrote, "de Bono's people are the worst of the lot, having utterly destroyed the country." In Khartoum, Consul John Petherick accused Debono and his nephew of involvement in slave trading, and although all charges were later dropped, Debono's reputation was ruined. His health declined after he lost his nephew, and he subsequently sold his property and moved back to Cairo. Debono died there on 29 October 1871 at the age of 49.

== Legacy ==
Andrea Debono was mentioned in the 1863 novel Five Weeks in a Balloon by Jules Verne.

A street in his hometown Senglea is named after him.
