= Dungu, Democratic Republic of the Congo =

Dungu
- Commune
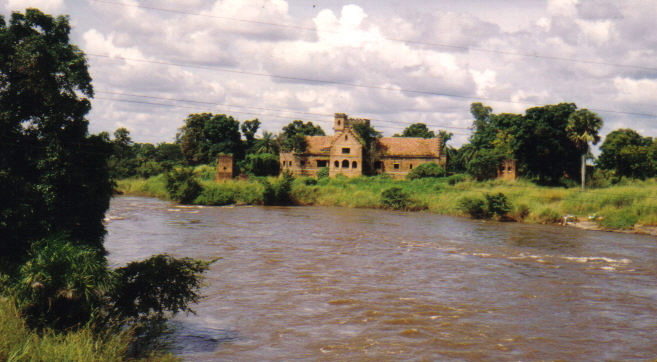
- Dungu Castle in 1986, built by a Belgian colonist

- Location in Democratic Republic of the Congo
- Coordinates: 3°37′N 28°34′E
- Country: DR Congo
- Province: Haut-Uele
- Territory: Dungu

Population (2009)
  - Total: 52,000
- Time zone: UTC+2 (CAT)
- Climate: Aw
- National language: Pazande and Lingala

Dungu (/ˈdʊŋɡuː/ DUUNG-goo) is a town in Haut-Uele Province located at the confluence of the Dungu and Kibali Rivers where they join to form the Uele River, south of the Garamba National Park. Dungu's terrain is wooded savannah, and its climate is tropical.

It is the administrative center of Dungu Territory. It has a hospital, nursing school, high school, Internet cafe, and a cathedral—as it is the seat of the Roman Catholic Diocese of Doruma-Dungu.

== History ==
=== Colonial history ===
In 1942, the Belgian territorial administrator Schollaert was given the task of building a bridge across the Dungu River. Instead of building a two-lane bridge as ordered, he built a one-lane bridge. With the remaining bricks he built a medieval style castle with 40 rooms between the Dungu and Kibali rivers.

=== Recent history and situation ===
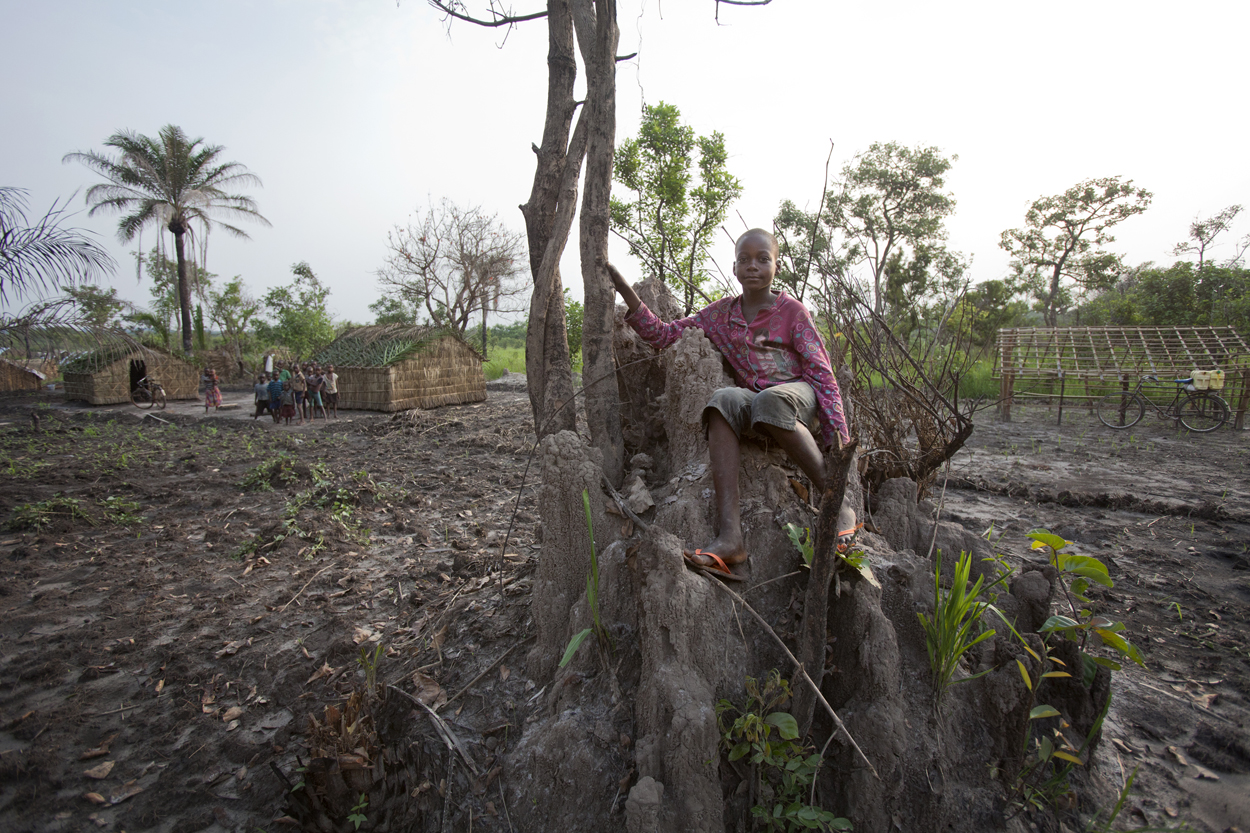
Refugee camp, 2012

Since the early 1990s, Sudanese refugees from the Second Sudanese Civil War have settled north of Dungu in two refugee camps, Kaka I and Kaka II, set up by Oxfam Quebec, an implementing partner of UNHCR in the Democratic Republic of Congo.

In September 2005 Joseph Kony's Lord's Resistance Army (LRA) entered Dungu Territory from Sudan and set up in Garamba National Park. Since October 2008, following attacks by the LRA, Médecins Sans Frontières has had a team in Dungu to help with the wounded and the health needs of the displaced, soon followed by other international relief NGOs such as Solidarités, Oxfam Quebec, Cesvi, Coopi, Danish Refugee Council and Medair. In December 2008 the LRA attacked the town of Dungu, resulting in all inhabitants temporarily fleeing.

According to an August 2009 report of Radio Okapi, 100,000 people in Dungu Territory have been displaced by the fighting.

== Humanitarian response to the LRA crisis ==
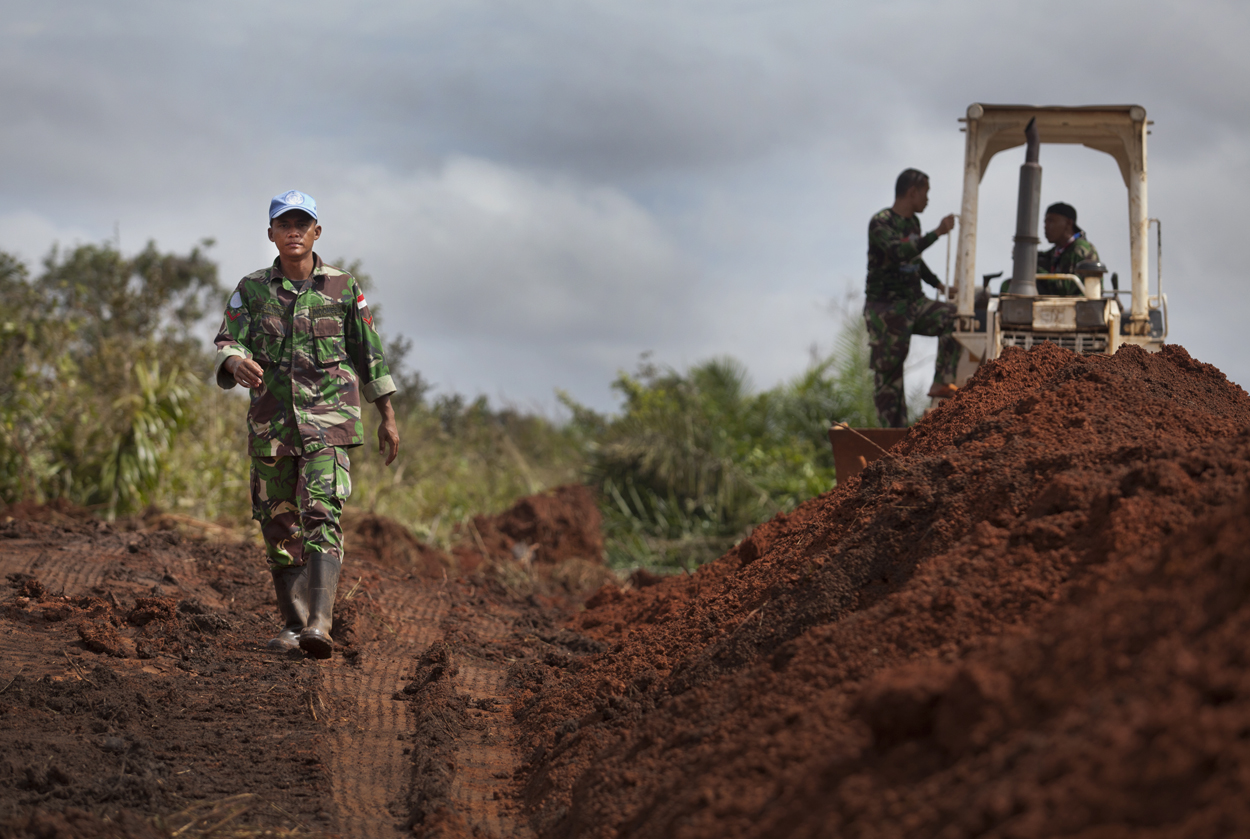
Following torrential rains in the Oriental Province in northern D.R. Congo in November 2012, which destroyed thousands of houses in Dungu, the MONUSCO Engineering Unit built an alternative road across the jungle to connect the town to the airfield, and thus facilitate humanitarian access to the area.

The LRA crisis has affected the whole of Haut-Uele District, and Dungu is used as the main base of operations for most, if not all, international and local humanitarian organizations, including MONUC and the UN agencies.

Although Medair, Terre Sans Frontières, MSF Suisse and Solidarités were present prior to the beginning of the LRA crisis in mid-September 2008, many non-governmental organizations set up bases and projects in various fields in January 2009. These NGOs are from Switzerland (Medair), Denmark (DRC – Danish Refugee Council), Italy (Cooperazione Internazionale or COOPI and Cesvi), Canada (Oxfam Quebec, Terre Sans Frontières), the United States (Mercy Corps) and the United Kingdom (Oxfam Great Britain); the International Committee of the Red Cross (ICRC), an international sovereign organisation, is also present. Local and national NGOs, such as Caritas DRC (known locally as Caritas Développement Congo) ADSSE and CDJP, are also active in Dungu.

The United Nations has a good presence in Dungu, with most of the agencies and MONUC firmly established in the town since March 2009. Two peacekeeping battalions (Moroccan and Indonesian) ensure security as well as road maintenance, while agencies such as OCHA, UNHCR, UNICEF, FAO, WFP and UNDP (through the Pooled Fund program) act as donors and coordinators of the humanitarian response. A detachment of Bangladesh Air Contingent (BANAIR) also operates under MONUSCO with 3 helicopters in Dungu.

== Administration ==
The town is divided into five main neighbourhoods: Uye (south), Mussa (south center), Ngirimo (center), Bamokandi and R.D.C border Town of Nabiapai to the (north) towards Yambio.

== Demography ==
In 2004 its population was estimated at over 23,000. The major tribe is the Azande, and the national language used locally is Pazande and Lingala. Some people speak a dialect of Lingala called Bangala, which contains many words from Zande language, Swahili, and other languages.

== Transport ==
Dungu is served by Dungu-Uye Airport, which is just southeast of the town.

== Gallery ==
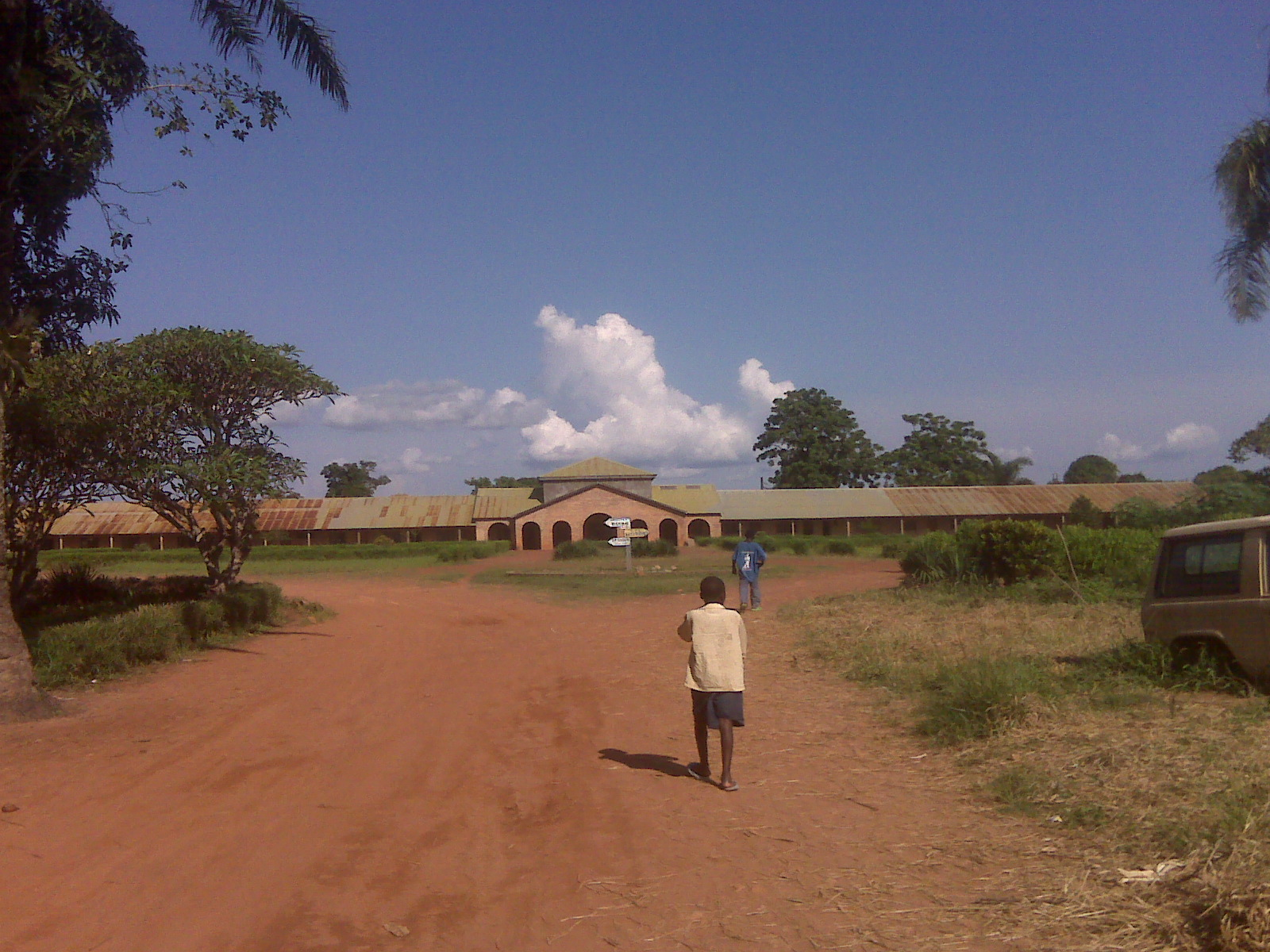
A Colonial Building

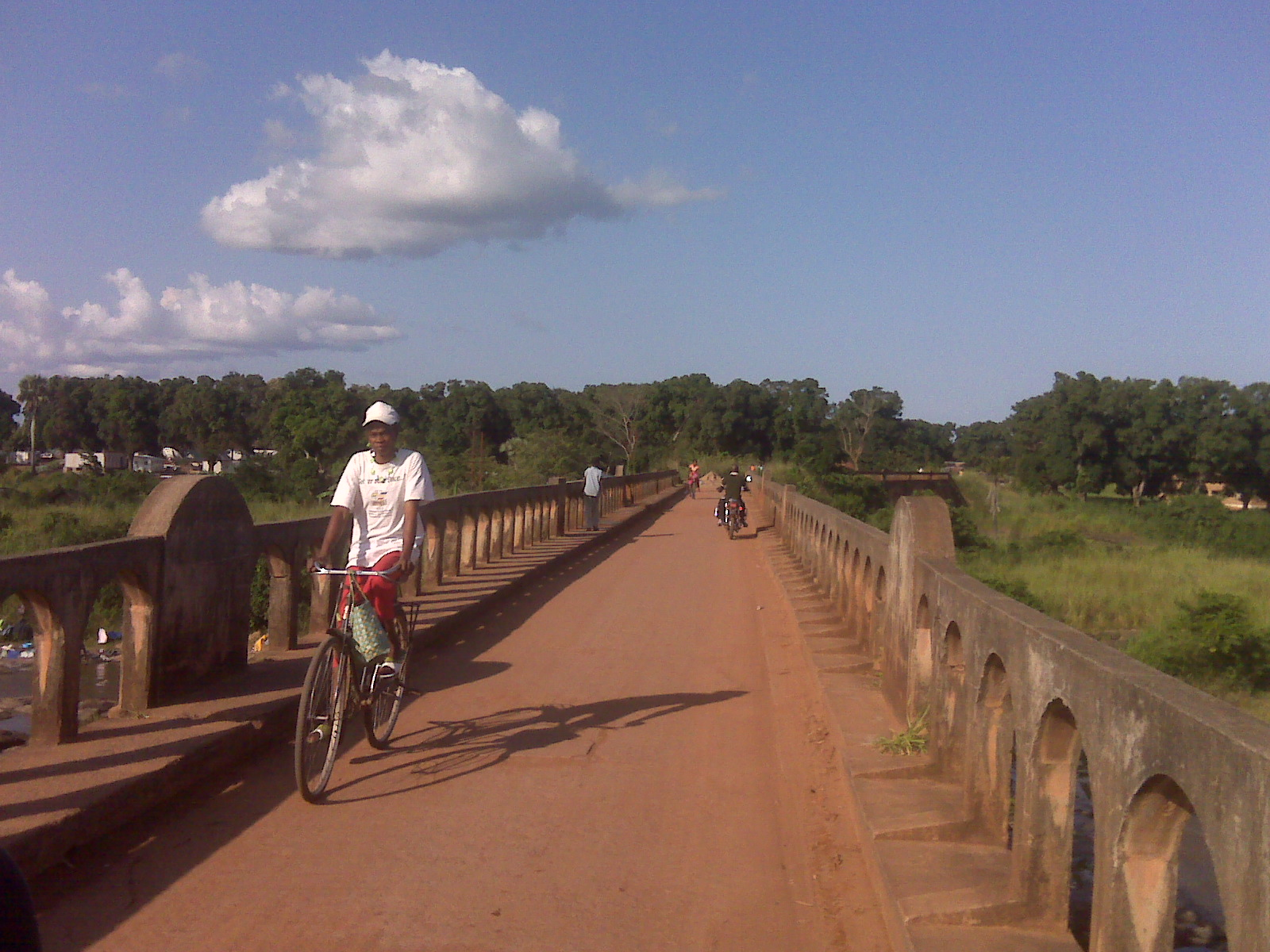
The Bridge over Dungu River

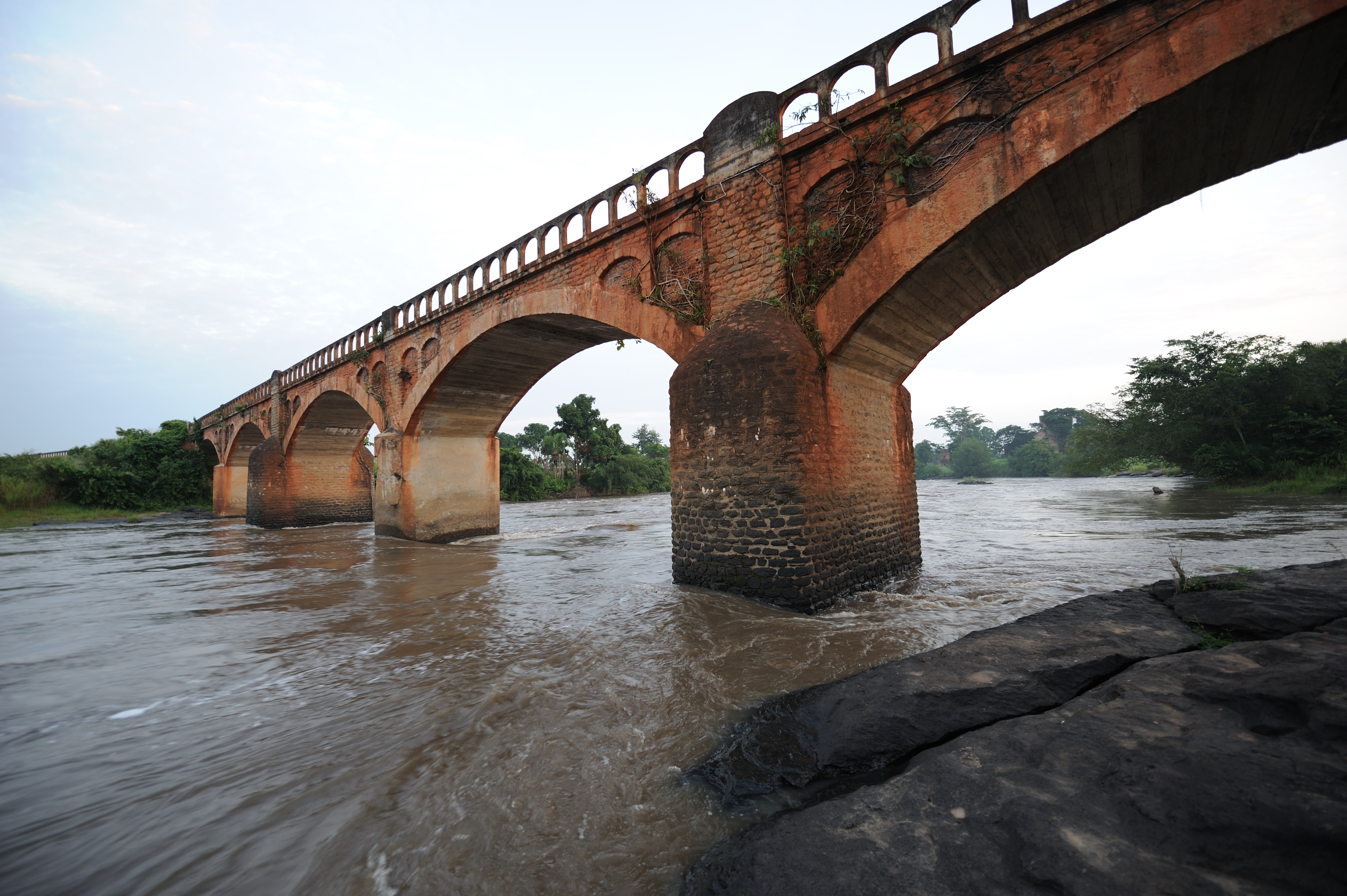
The Bridge over Dungu River

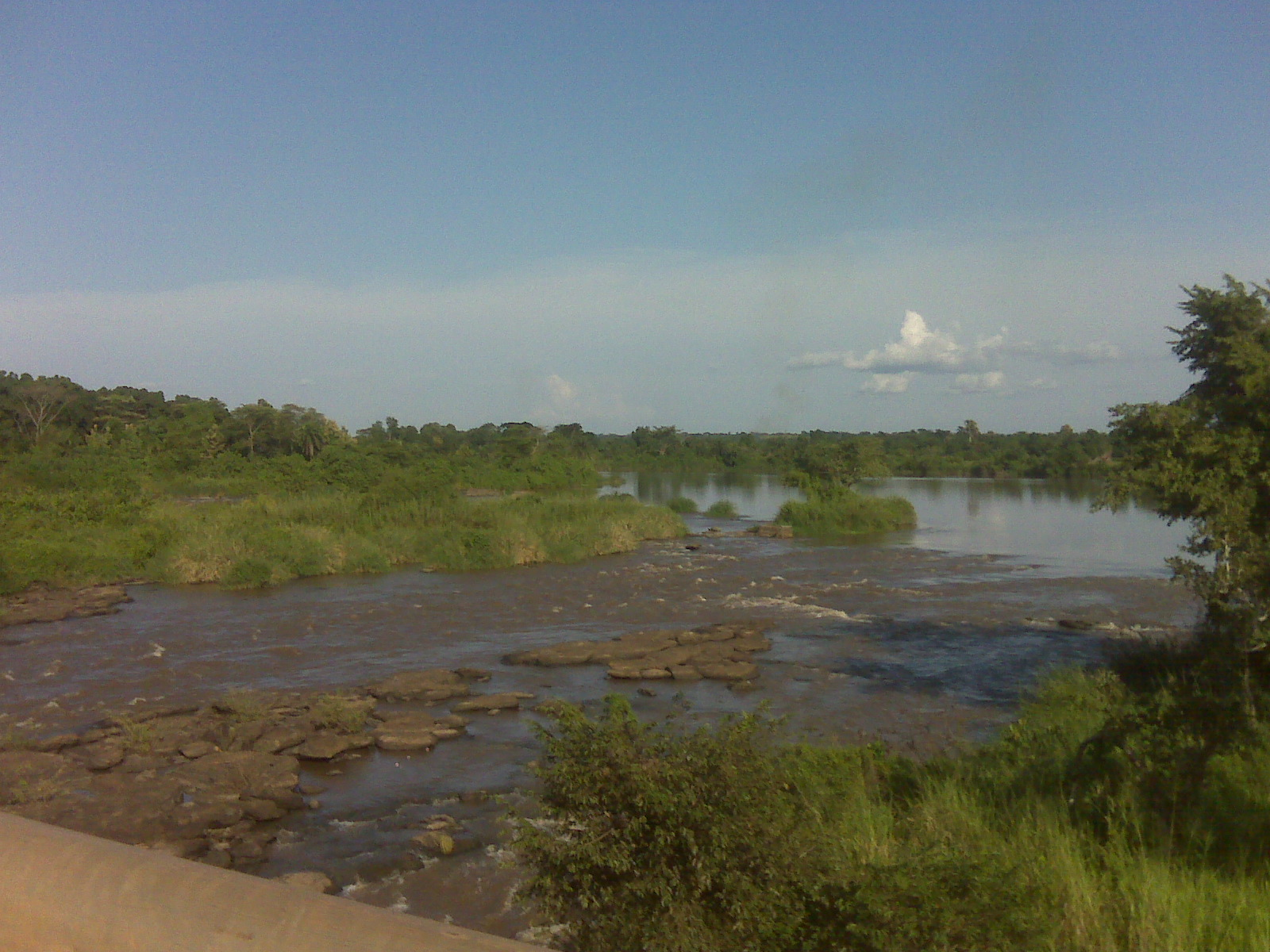
Dungu River

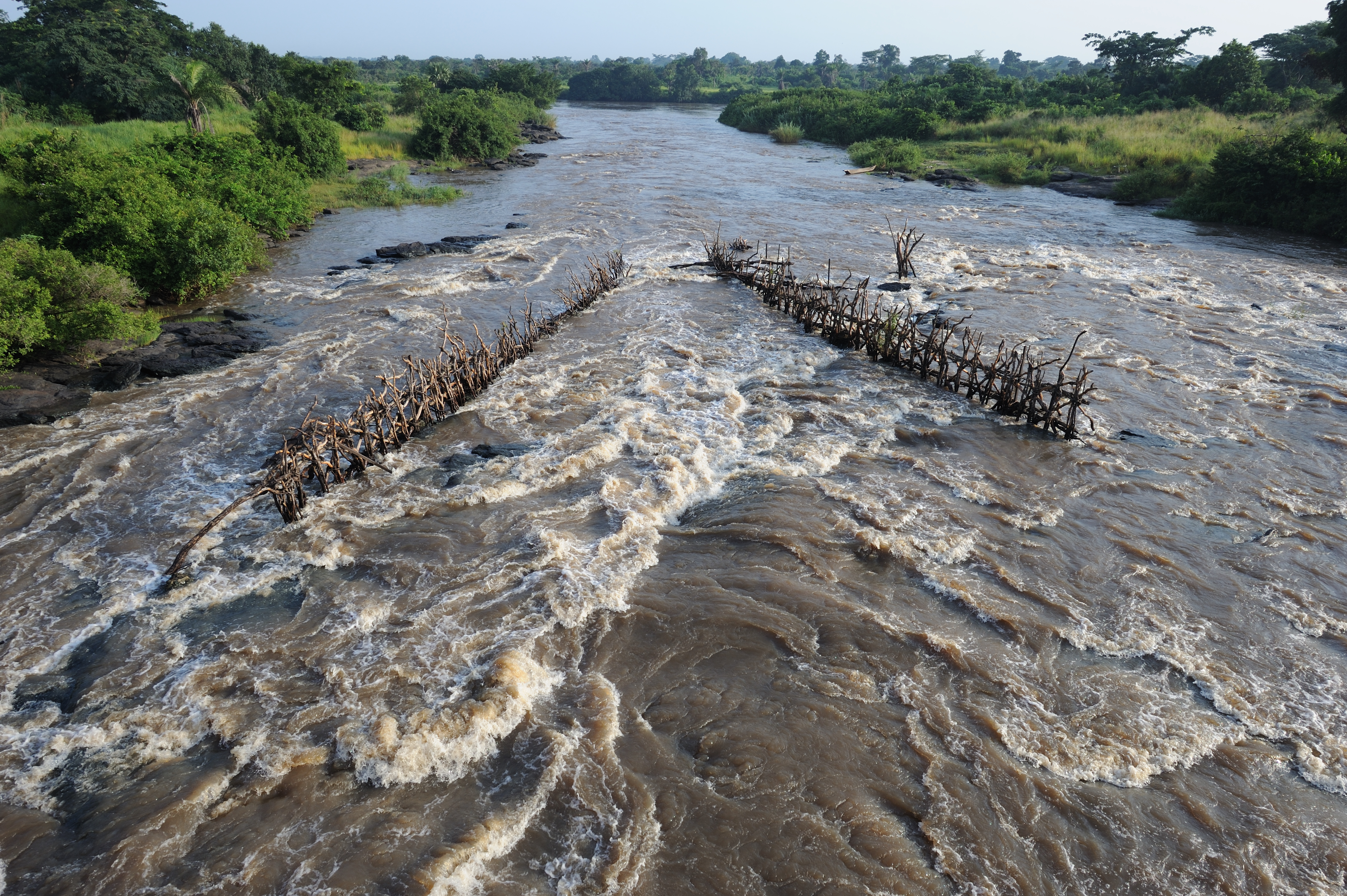
Fish traps in the Uele River

== See also ==
- Sexual violence in the Democratic Republic of the Congo
