= Uere River =

River located in the Democratic Republic of the Congo

Coordinates: 3.5539°N 25.2527°E

The Uere River, also spelled Were River is a river in the Democratic Republic of the Congo. It originates near the border with Sudan and flows west to join the Uele River.
