= Congo–Nile Divide =

Continental divide in Africa

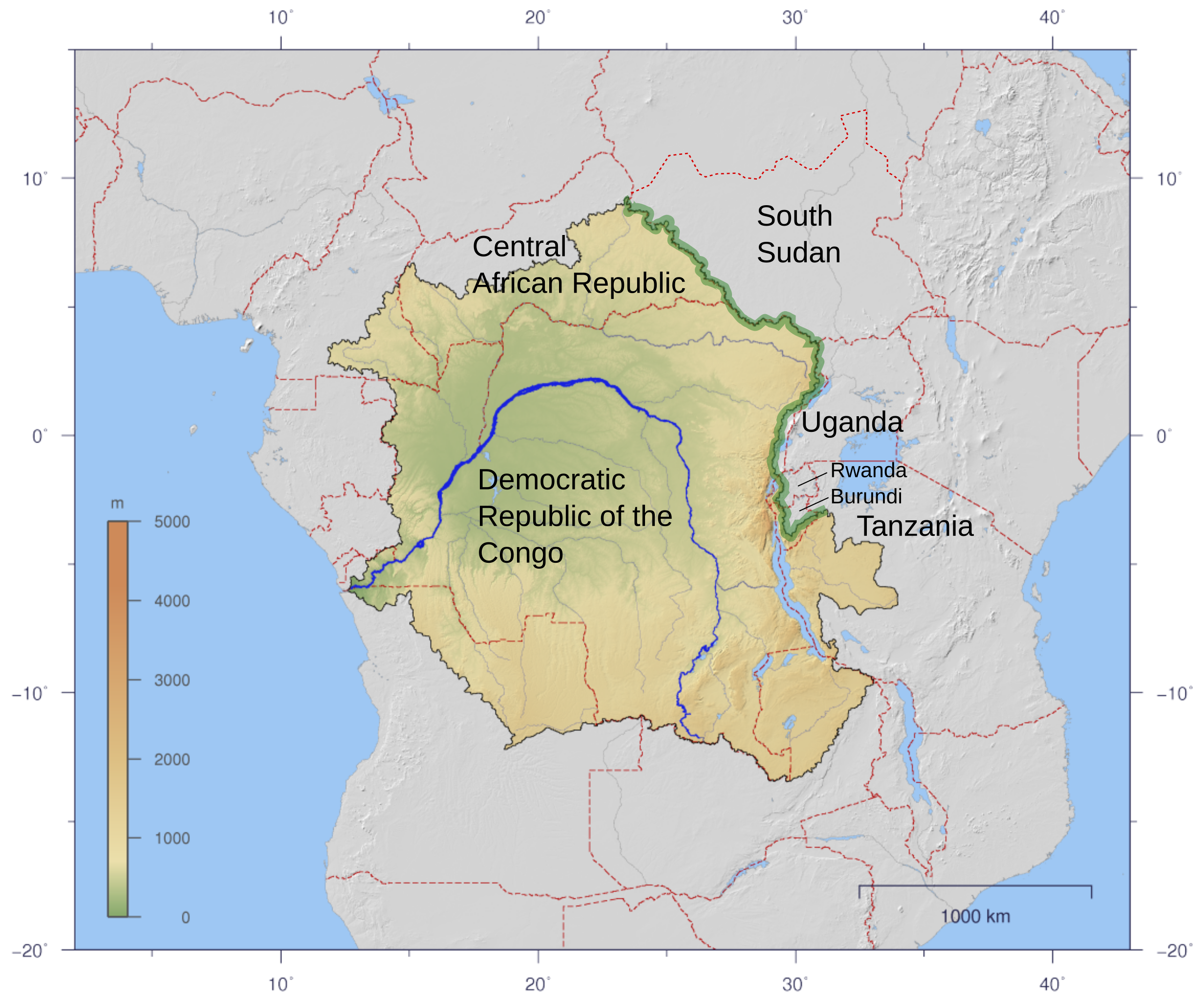
Congo Basin with the divide between it and the Nile Basin to the east highlighted in green.

The Congo–Nile Divide or the Nile–Congo Watershed is the continental divide that separates the drainage basins of the Congo and Nile rivers. It is about 2,000 kilometres (1,200 mi) long.

There are several geologically and geographically distinct sections between the point on the border between the Central African Republic and South Sudan where the Congo and Nile basins meet the Chad Basin, and the southern point in Tanzania to the southwest of Lake Victoria where the boundaries of the Nile and Congo basins diverge and border several endorheic basins in the Gregory Rift, of which the largest are Lake Eyasi in the north and Lake Rukwa in the south.

The people who live along the divide are diverse, mainly speaking Central Sudanic languages in the northern parts and Bantu languages further south. The European colonialists used the Congo–Nile divide as a boundary between British-controlled territories to the east and territories controlled by the French and Belgians to the west. This was decided at a time when few Europeans had visited the area, which had yet to be mapped. It separated members of the ethnic groups that live on both sides of the divide.

== Location ==
=== Northern section: Sudan ===
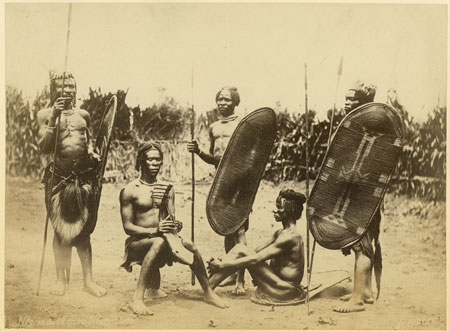
Azande people c. 1880. Their territory lay on either side of the northern section of the divide, which was made an international frontier at the Berlin Conference of 1884–85.

The Congo–Nile divide starts at the triple divide where the Congo, Chad and Nile basins meet. This point is located on the boundary between the Central African Republic and the Sudan, at the limit between the Vakaga and Haute-Kotto prefectures. From this triple point:

1. the Umbelasha River flows to the North East into the Nile, through the Bahr al-Arab and the Bahr el Ghazal River.
2. the Kotto River flows to the South into the Congo River, through the Ubangi River.
3. the Yata River flows to the North West into Lake Chad, through the Bahr Oulou, the Bahr Aouk River and the Chari River.

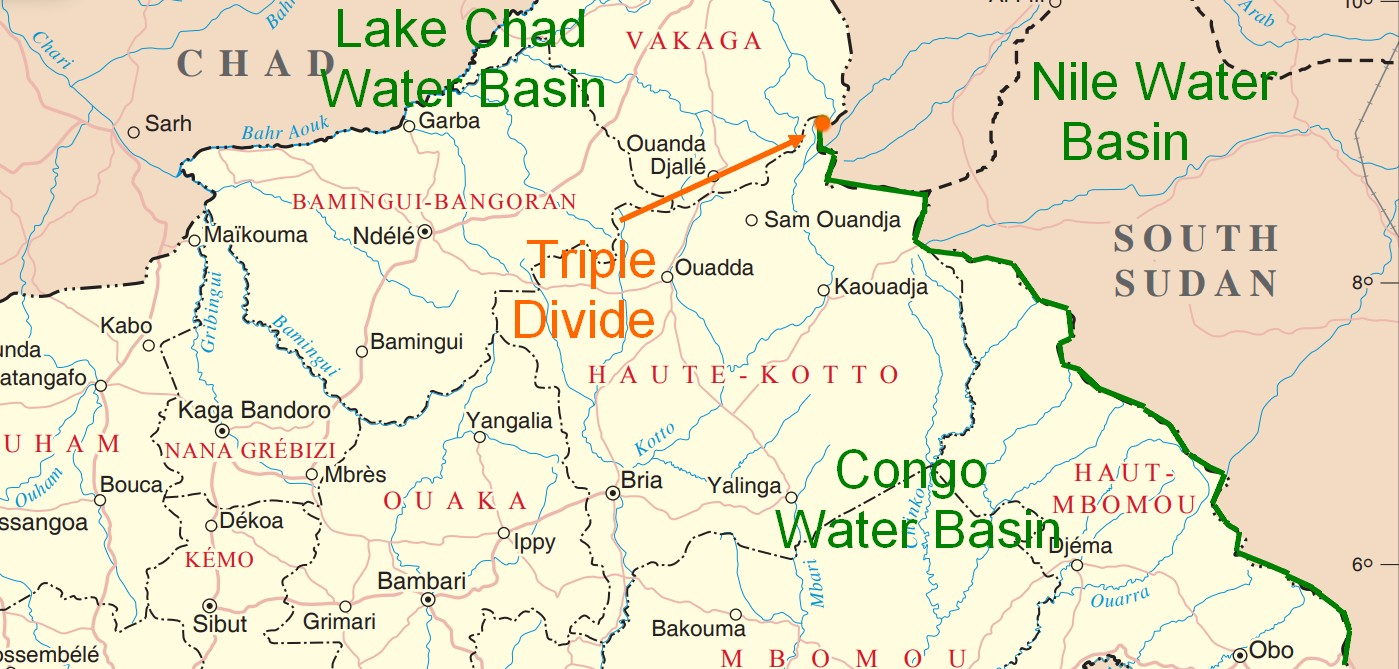
The Congo–Nile divide (green line) starts at the triple divide (orange dot) where the Congo, Chad and Nile basins meet. This point is located on the boundary the Central African Republic and Sudan, at the limit between the Vakaga and Haute-Kotto prefectures.

The Congo–Nile divide runs southeast and then south along the border between South Sudan and Uganda to the east and the Central African Republic and Democratic Republic of the Congo (DRC) to the west.

The Ironstone Plateau region between South Sudan and the DRC is cut by many streams that have formed steep and narrow valleys. The vast Sudd wetlands in South Sudan are fed by the Bahr al Jabal river that drains Lake Albert and Lake Victoria in the south, and also from ten smaller rivers flowing from the Congo–Nile divide which together provide 20 billion cubic meters of water annually.

The easily traveled northern section of the divide may have been the main route for Bantu expansion to the east and south in the Iron Age. The combination of deforestation due to seed agriculture, cattle ownership and changes in weapons technology with the introduction of iron may have allowed Bantu-speakers to migrate south through the region into Buganda no more than 1,500 years ago. From there, they would have continued yet further south.

The people who now live along the Congo–Nile divide in South Sudan speak Central Sudanic languages, and include the Kresh people. They once lived to the west of the divide in the region to the south of Lake Chad, but were forced east and south by expanding populations further to the west. The Europeans knew little about the area in 1885, when they made the divide the boundary between Belgian and French spheres of influence to the west and the British sphere of influence to the east. The line ran through the territory of the Zande people, who lived in the dense woodland in the extreme southwest of what is now South Sudan and northeast of what is now the Democratic Republic of the Congo. About 29% of them now lived in the Sudan, 68% in the Congo and the rest in the French colony of Ubangi-Shari, now the Central African Republic.

=== Central section: west of Albertine rift ===
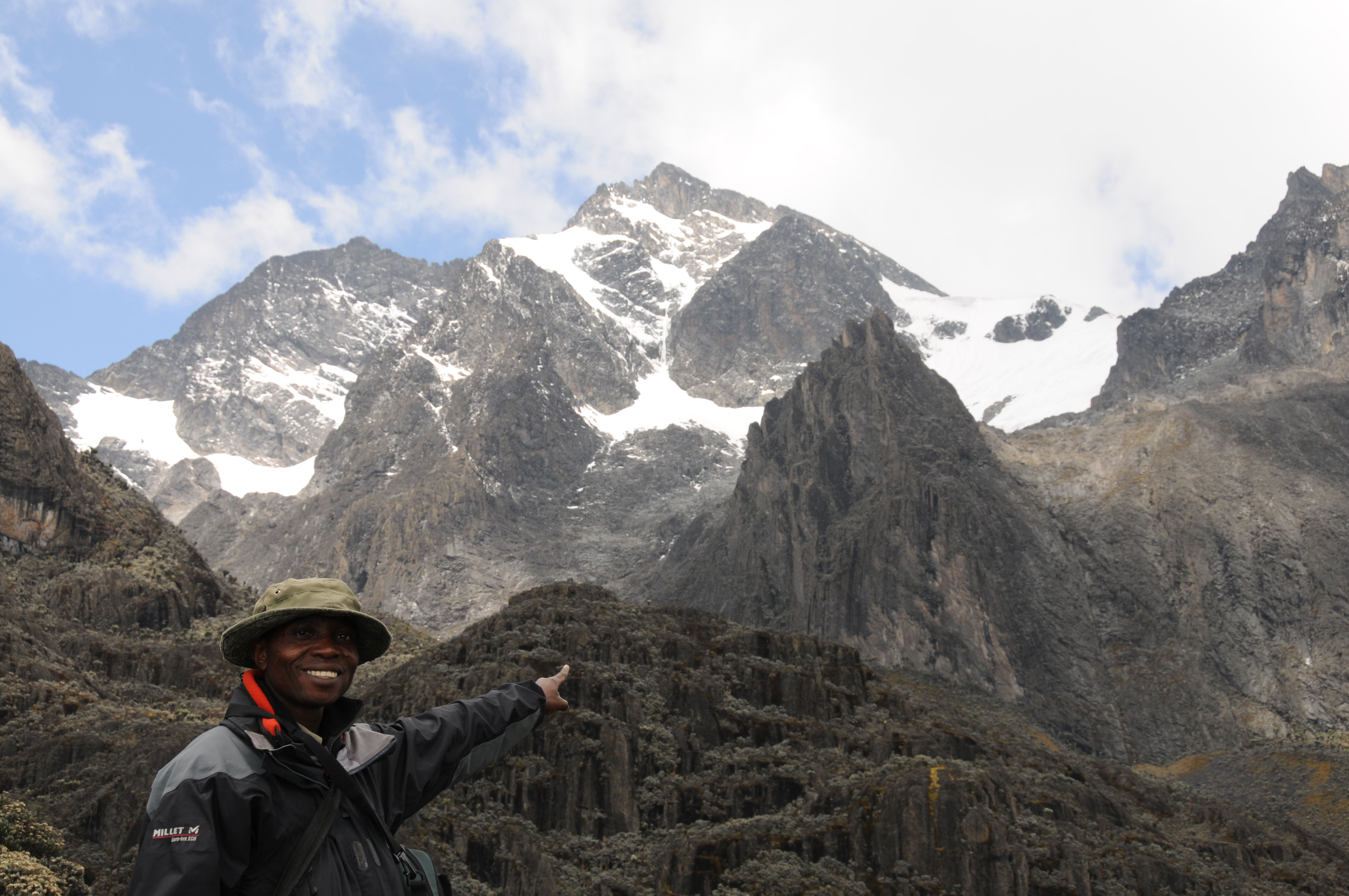
Ruwenzori Mountains in the central part of the divide, to the west of the Albertine rift

In the central section, the divide runs along the mountains that form the west flank of the Albertine Rift from Lake Albert in the north, past Lake Edward and on towards the north end of Lake Kivu. The divide crosses the Albertine rift along the line of the Virunga Mountains, to the north of Lake Kivu.

The Virunga Massif along the border between Rwanda and the DRC consists of eight volcanoes. Two of these, Nyamuragira and Nyiragongo, are still highly active. South of the Virungas, Lake Kivu drains to the south into Lake Tanganyika through the Ruzizi River. Lake Tanganyika then drains into the Congo River via the Lukuga River. It seems likely that the present hydrological system was established quite recently when the Virunga volcanoes erupted and blocked the northward flow of water from Lake Kivu into Lake Edward, causing it instead to discharge southward into Lake Tanganyika. Before that Lake Tanganyika, or separate sub-basins in what is now the lake, may have had no outlet other than evaporation.

=== Southern section: east of Albertine rift ===
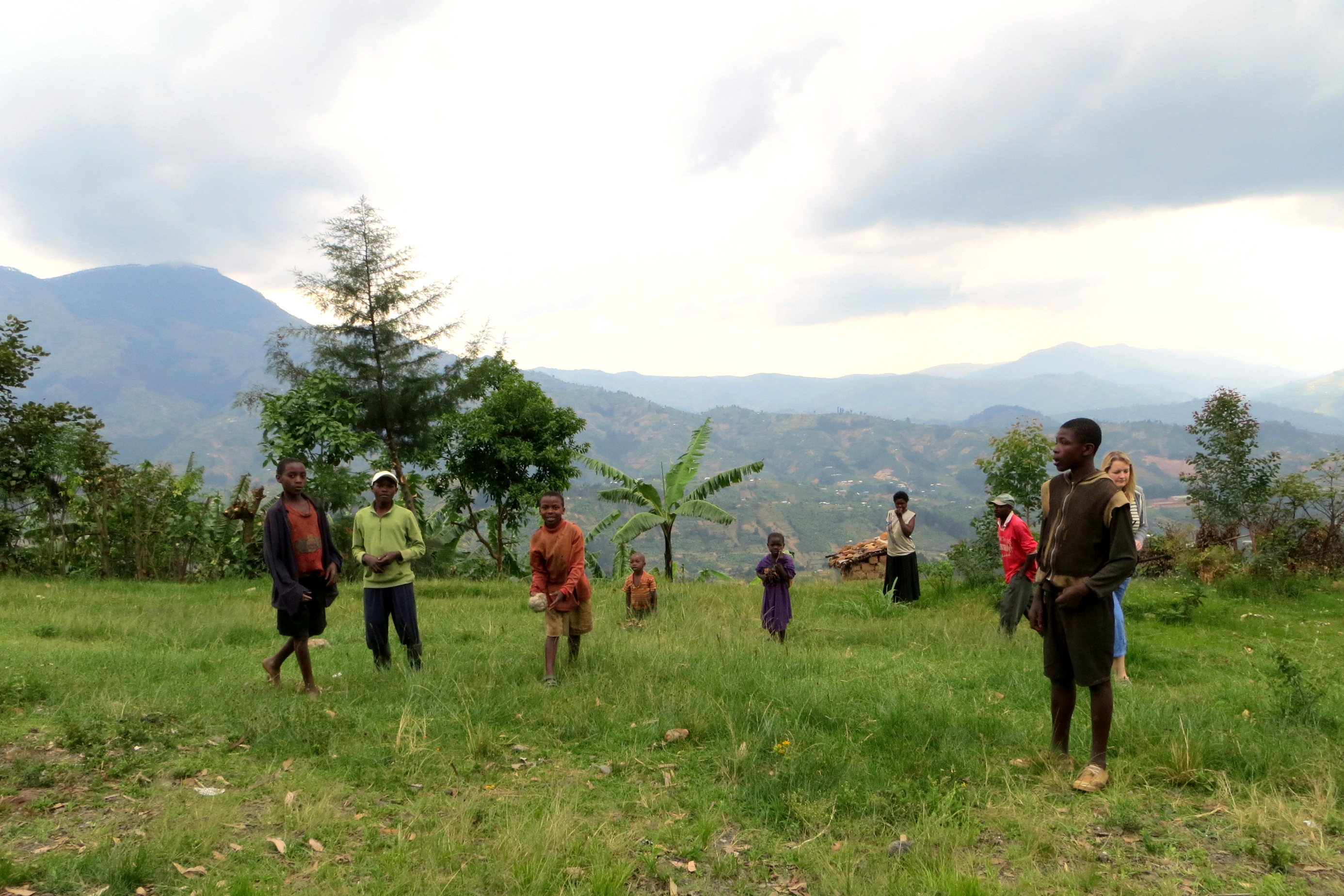
Mountains in Rwanda. The volcanoes in the background are the Virunga Mountains, home of the critically endangered mountain gorillas.

In the south, the divide runs from a point near the southwest corner of Lake Victoria in a southwesterly direction through Tanzania and Burundi to the mountains that form the eastern wall of the Albertine Rift. The divide runs northward along the crest of these mountains to the east of Lake Tanganyika and Lake Kivu.

This region includes the Nyungwe Forest in Rwanda and the Kibira National Park in Burundi. The parks provide a refuge for various primates of conservation concern, and also for rare bird and plant species. Around these parks the land is heavily populated, and agriculture is practiced intensively. Farming is difficult in this area, where peaks can be over 3,000 metres (10,000 ft) high. The parks are under pressure from the people that live near them. The Rukarara River rises in forested country in southern Rwanda to the east of the divide. The source of the Rukarara is now known to be the overall source of the Nile – the point at the furthest distance upstream from the river's mouth.

The Congo–Nile Divide ends at the endorheic basin of Lake Eyasi in Tanzania.

== European exploration and boundary setting ==
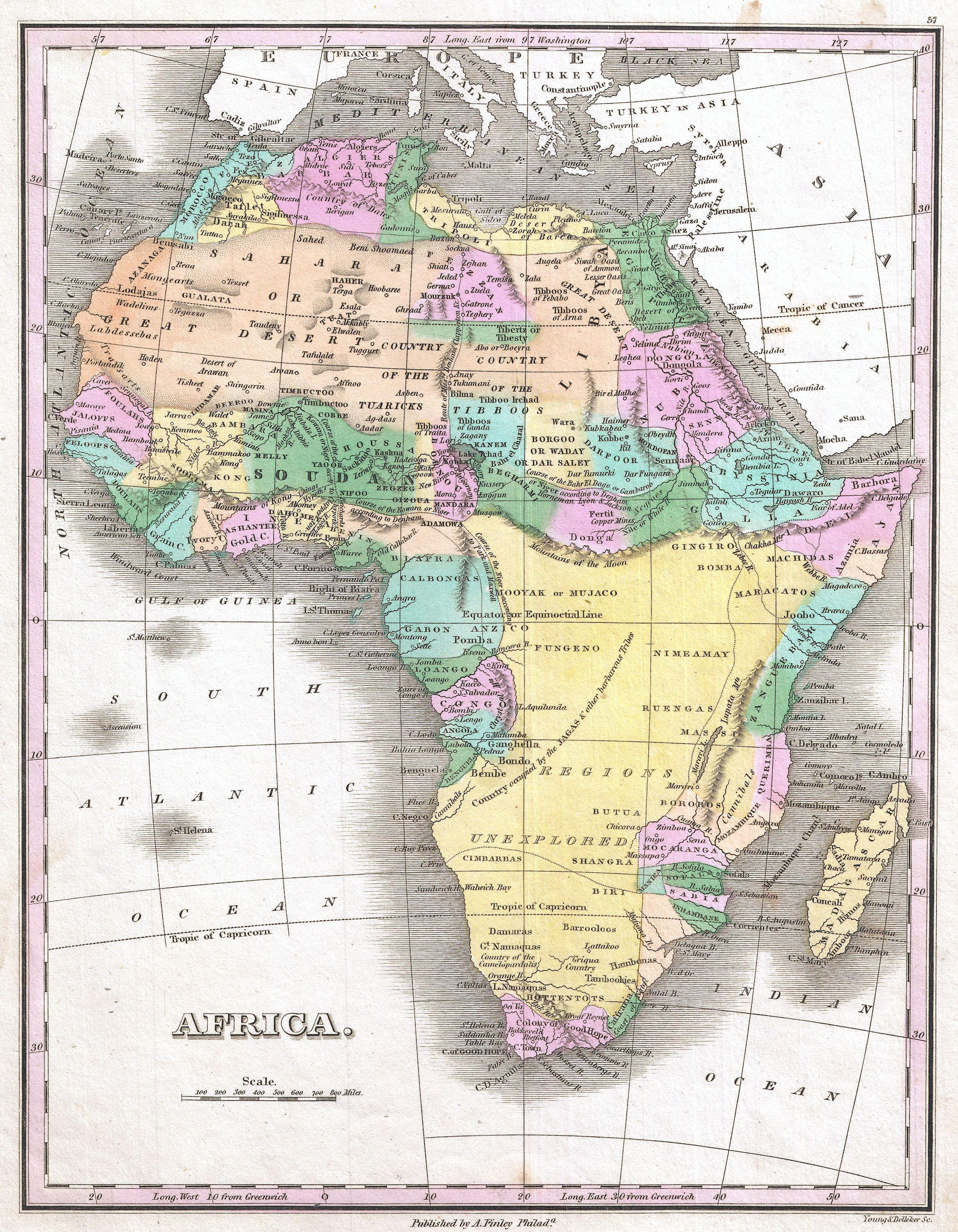
An 1827 map, where the Congo basin was thought to be much smaller, and the Nile to originate in the Mountains of the Moon, to the west of today's South Sudan. The coastline is depicted accurately, but the interior and the Great Lakes were unknown.

The East African great lakes plateau was difficult for the nineteenth-century European explorers to access, with inhospitable arid or semi-arid land to the north, east and southeast, and the difficult Congo Basin forests to the west. The route from the south via the rift valley lakes, Nyasa and Tanganyika, was easier, and the Congo–Nile divide from the northwest provided the easiest route.

The Ruzizi River, flowing south into Lake Tanganyika, is part of the upper watershed of the Congo River. Nineteenth-century British explorers such as Richard Francis Burton and John Hanning Speke, uncertain of the direction of flow of the Ruzizi, thought that it might flow north out of the lake toward the White Nile. Their research and follow-up explorations by David Livingstone and Henry Morton Stanley established among Europeans that this was not the case. The Ruzizi flows into Lake Tanganyika, which overflows into the Lukuga River about 120 kilometres (75 mi) south of Ujiji. The Lukuga flows west into the Lualaba River, a major tributary of the Congo.

Other European explorers who helped map out the region included Panayotis Potagos (1839–1903), Georg August Schweinfurth (1836–1925), who discovered the Uele River, although he mistakenly thought it flowed into the Chad Basin rather than the Congo, Wilhelm Junker (1840–1892), who corrected Schweinfurth's hydrographical theories, and Oskar Lenz 1848–1925).

The Berlin Conference of 1885 agreed that the Nile–Congo watershed would form the boundary between the British Sudan and the Congo State. Under an agreement of 12 May 1894 between Britain and King Leopold II of Belgium, the sphere of influence of Leopold's Congo Free State was limited to "a frontier following the 30th meridian east of Greenwich up to its intersection by the watershed between the Nile and Congo and hence following the watershed in a northerly and north-westerly direction."

In 1907 C.E. Comyn published a survey, Western Sources of the Nile, in the Geographical Journal. He claimed to be the only living "white man who had crossed the headwaters of all the rivers from river Wau to Bahr al-Arab." In 1911 Comyn, in his Service and Sport in the Sudan, described the tributaries of the Nile that came from the Congo–Nile divide to the east of the Central African Republic.

In 1915–16, when the divide defined part of the western frontier of the Anglo-Egyptian Sudan, Cuthbert Christy explored the area. He opined that it was a suitable place to build a railway.

France and Britain made a friendly agreement in 1919 to define the boundary between the Anglo-Egyptian Sudan and French Equatorial Africa. The boundary was to run along the Nile–Congo divide until the 11th parallel of northern latitude, and then along the boundary between Darfur and Wadai. Most of this area had not previously been explored by Europeans. A joint Anglo-French surveying party left Khartoum at the end of 1921. The section along the divide from the 11th to 5th parallel, where French Equatorial Africa met the Belgian Congo, was densely wooded and uninhabited. The expedition could not buy food locally but had to carry all they needed. Pinning down the location of the divide was extremely difficult. The technique was to march along a compass bearing until a stream was reached, then to follow it up to its ultimate source, which was often a marsh, and to determine its location. The surveyors suffered from poor food, although there was abundant game, from malaria and from torrential rainfall. It took eighteen months to complete the task.

== Sources ==
- Barbour, K.M. (1961). "A Geographical Analysis of Boundaries in Inter-Tropical Africa". Essays on African Population. Taylor & Francis. GGKEY:W5HTG750C3U.
- Brakspear, Patrick (2008). On Safari in Africa: 101 Things to Know When You Go. On Safari in Africa. p. 20. ISBN 978-0-9805048-0-4.
- Clark, John Desmond (1969). Kalambo Falls prehistoric site, Volume 1. CUP Archive.
- Collins, Robert O. (2006-04-01). "The" Southern Sudan in Historical Perspective. Transaction Publishers. p. 11. ISBN 978-1-4128-3484-1.
- "Congo-Nile Divide Landscape". Albertine Rift. Wildlife Conservation Society.
- Dumont, Henri J. (2009). The Nile: Origin, Environments, Limnology and Human Use. Springer. p. 2. ISBN 978-1-4020-9726-3.
- Erfurt-Cooper, Patricia; Cooper, Malcolm (2010). Volcano and Geothermal Tourism: Sustainable Geo-Resources for Leisure and Recreation. Earthscan. ISBN 978-1-84407-870-7.
- Hughes, Ralph H.; Hughes, Jane S.; Bernacsek, G. M. (1992). Iucn Directory of African Wetlands. IUCN. p. 205. ISBN 978-2-88032-949-5.
- McMaster, D.N. (2013-01-11). "Speculations on the Coming of the Banada to Uganda". An Economic History of Tropical Africa: Volume One : The Pre-Colonial Period. Routledge. p. 26. ISBN 978-1-136-27084-0.
- Okbazghi, Yohannes (2008). Suny Series in Global Politics: Water Resources and Inter-Riparian Relations in the Nile Basin: the Search for an Integrative Discourse. SUNY Press. ISBN 978-0-7914-7854-7.
- Ondaatje, Christopher (1998). Journey to the Source of the Nile. Toronto: Harper Collins. ISBN 0-00-200019-9.
- Streissguth, Thomas (2008). Rwanda in Pictures. Twenty-First Century Books. p. 11. ISBN 978-0-8225-8570-1.
- Sykes, Percy Molesworth (1949). A History of Exploration from the Earliest Times to the Present Day. Taylor & Francis. ISBN 978-0-8371-8576-7.
- The Expansion of Egypt. Taylor & Francis. p. 413. GGKEY:NJTBBU1FAGG.
- Tvedt, Terje (2004-01-17). The Nile: An Annotated Bibliography. I.B.Tauris. ISBN 978-1-86064-879-3.

Further reading

- Christy, C. (1917). Nile-Congo Watershed. By Major C. Christy ... 1916. Scale, 1 : 1,000,000.
