= Dungu, Ghana =

Coordinates: 9°29′N 0°51′W

Dungu is a community in Tamale Metropolitan District, under the Sagnarigu Traditional area in the Northern Region of Ghana.

== Population ==
The community has a total population of 3979 of which the majority are Dagombas, and minorities are Kasena Nankana, Gonja, Ewe, and others. Dungu houses the University for Development Studies (UDS) and commercial facilities.

== Chieftaincy ==
Nyab Dungu-Naa, Mahamadu Nagumsi is the Traditional chief of Dungu. Traditionally, the chief of Dungu bears the title Dungu-Naa popularly known as Nyab Dungu-Naa.

== See also ==
- Suburbs of Tamale (Ghana) metropolis
