= Kibali River =

Coordinates: 4°9′N 22°26′E

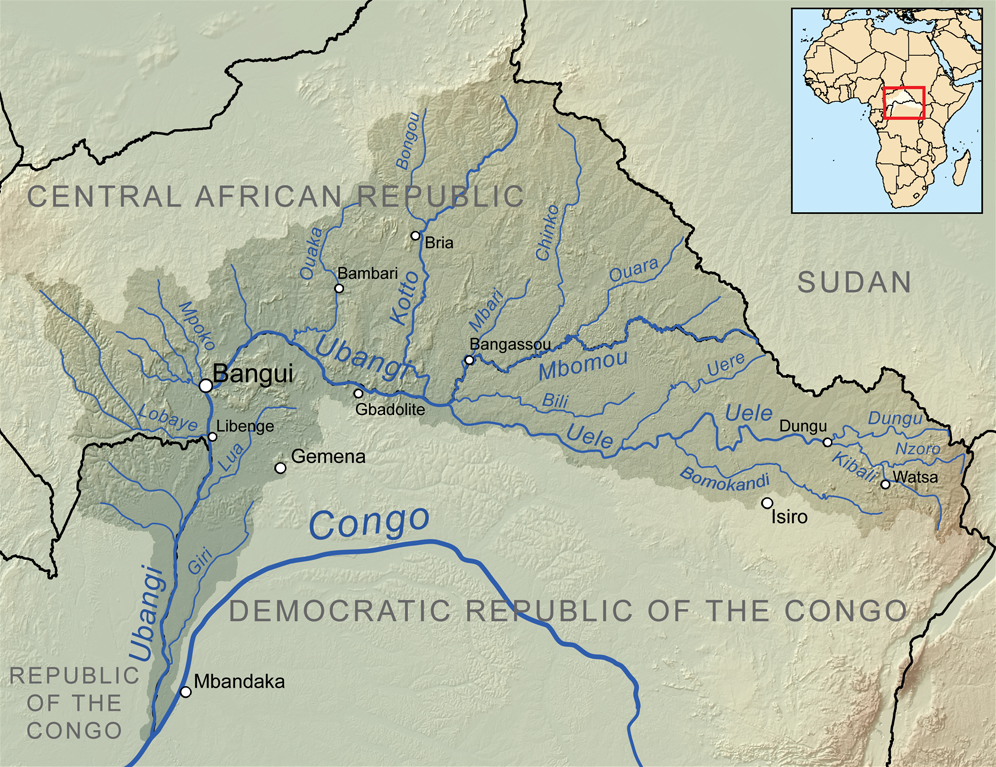
Map showing the Kibali River within the Ubangi River drainage basin

The Kibali River is a tributary to the Uele River in the Democratic Republic of the Congo. It originates in the mountains near Lake Albert and flows west for about 1,000 kilometres (620 mi) to join the Dungu River at Dungu where the Uele River is formed. The Uele is a tributary to the Ubangi River, which subsequently flows into the great Congo River.
