= Cesvi =

Humanitarian organization in Italy

Cesvi (Italian, "cooperazione e sviluppo", cooperation and development) is an Italian humanitarian organization. Founded on 18 January 1985 from a volunteer experience connected with Nicaragua, it was recognized by the Italian Ministry of Foreign Affairs as a non-governmental organization in 1988. It has about 30 offices all over the world.

Cesvi provides assistance in emergency situations (including famine) and epidemics (especially malaria and dengue in the South East Asia, malaria and HIV/AIDS in Africa), helps refugees (e.g. North Uganda and DR Congo) and flood victims, supports reconstruction after disasters (earthquakes, tsunami), implements projects for sustainable development and environmental defence in poor countries.

The organization is sponsored by Italian private donors (34%), public donors (European Union, Ministry of Foreign Affairs of Italy, United Nations agencies), foundations, companies, local authorities. Among its fields of expertise are the problems of food/nutrition, HIV/AIDS, health, refugees and IDPs, shelter, water and sanitation.

The Cesvi projects in Vietnam include education of mothers and schoolchildren, growth monitoring, training of health workers on community and clinical nutrition, scientific workshops for university professors and trainers, production and distribution of food and supplements for kindergartens, hospitals and families, microcredit support of integrated farming systems at the household level, clinical consultations, nutritional rehabilitation.

== History and activities ==
According to Cesvi's own history, its work has included health-sector activity in Bosnia, famine relief in North Korea, AIDS-related programmes in Zimbabwe, and emergency responses after disasters and crises in Haiti, Nepal, Pakistan, Gaza, and the Philippines after Typhoon Haiyan. Cesvi Fondazione has held special consultative status with the United Nations Economic and Social Council since 2004. The European Commission listed CESVI Fondazione Onlus as a certified EU humanitarian partner for 2021-2027.
