= Dungu River (Democratic Republic of the Congo) =

River in Democratic Republic of the Congo

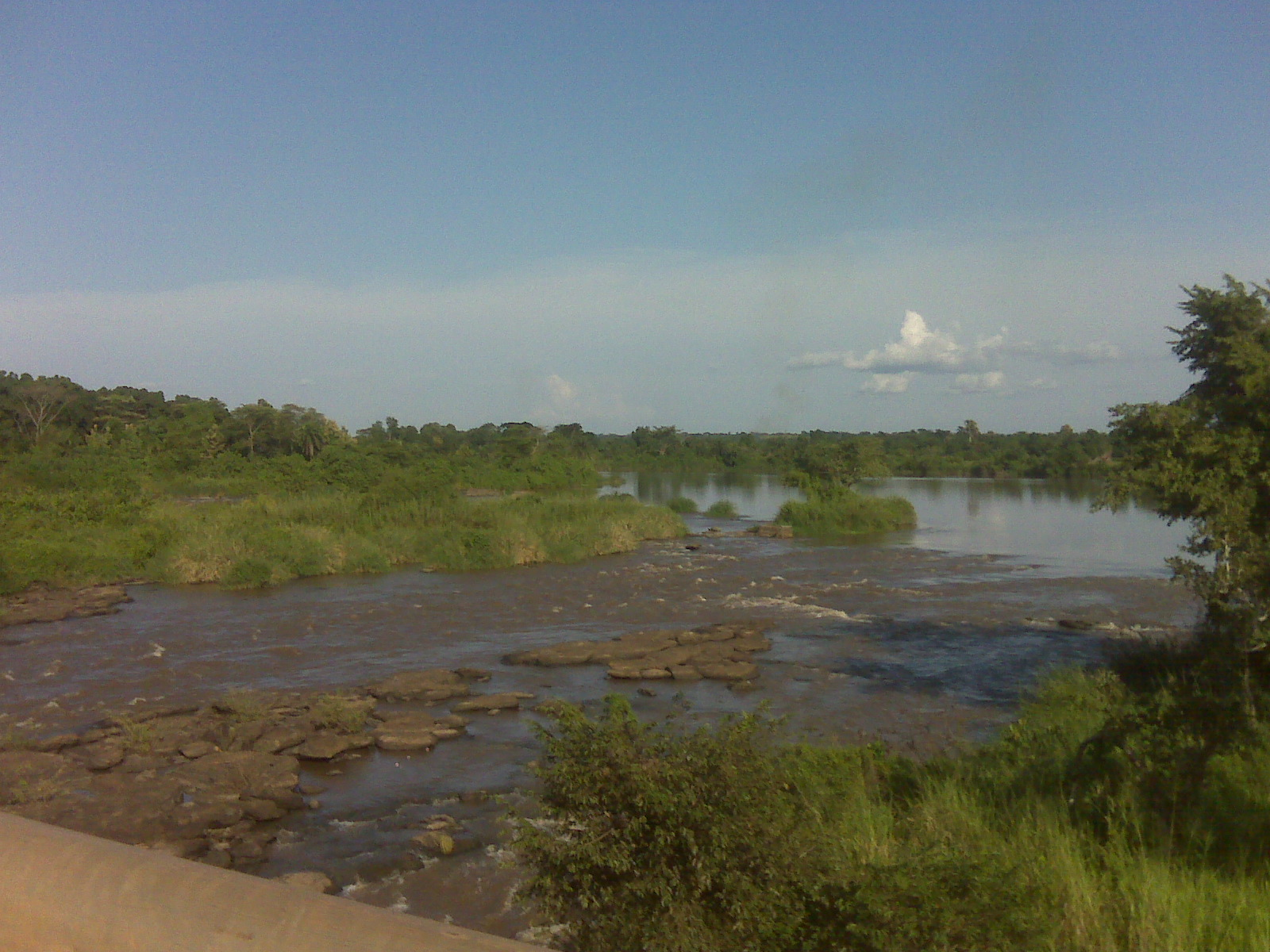
- The River Dungu in Dungu, RDC

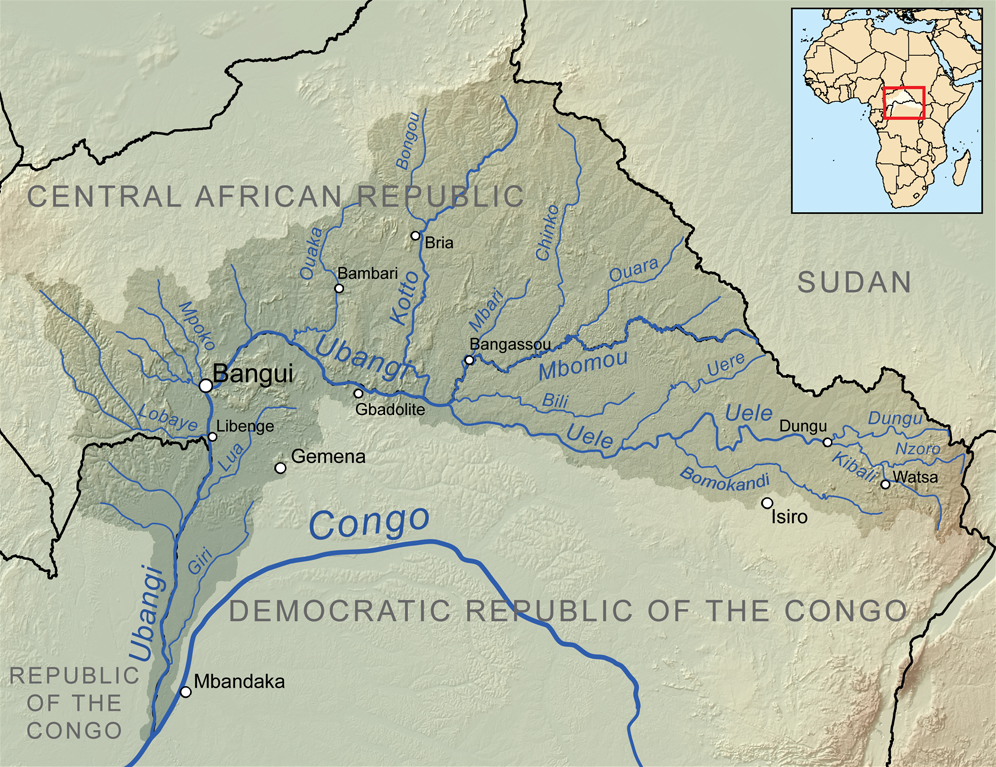
- The Ubangi River drainage basin: Dungu River in the far east

Location
- Country: Democratic Republic of the Congo
- Province: Haut-Uele

Physical characteristics
- Mouth
  - location: Dungu
  - coordinates: 3.619773°N 28.564968°E

The Dungu River is a river that flows through Haut-Uele province in the Democratic Republic of the Congo. It passes through the town of Faradje, and joins the Kibali River at Dungu to form the Uele River.

The river flows between the town of Dungu and the local airstrip. The river is home to crocodiles, hippopotamuses and snakes. In October 2012 exceptionally high levels of rainfall caused the river to flood, submerging parts of the Garamba National Park, including the park manager's house.
