= Bomokandi River =

River in Democratic Republic of the Congo

- Location within Democratic Republic of the Congo

Physical characteristics
- Mouth: Uele River
  - location: Bambili
  - coordinates: 3.657282°N 26.120525°E

Basin features
- Tributaries
  - left: Makongo River

The Bomokandi River is a river in the Congo Basin in the Democratic Republic of the Congo.

The river originates in the southeast of Haut-Uélé province near Gombari, and flows in a ENE direction through Haut-Uélé and Bas-Uélé past Rungu and Poko to join the Uele River at Bambili.
