= Uele River =

River in the Democratic Republic of the Congo

Uele River Uélé, Ouélé, or Welle River
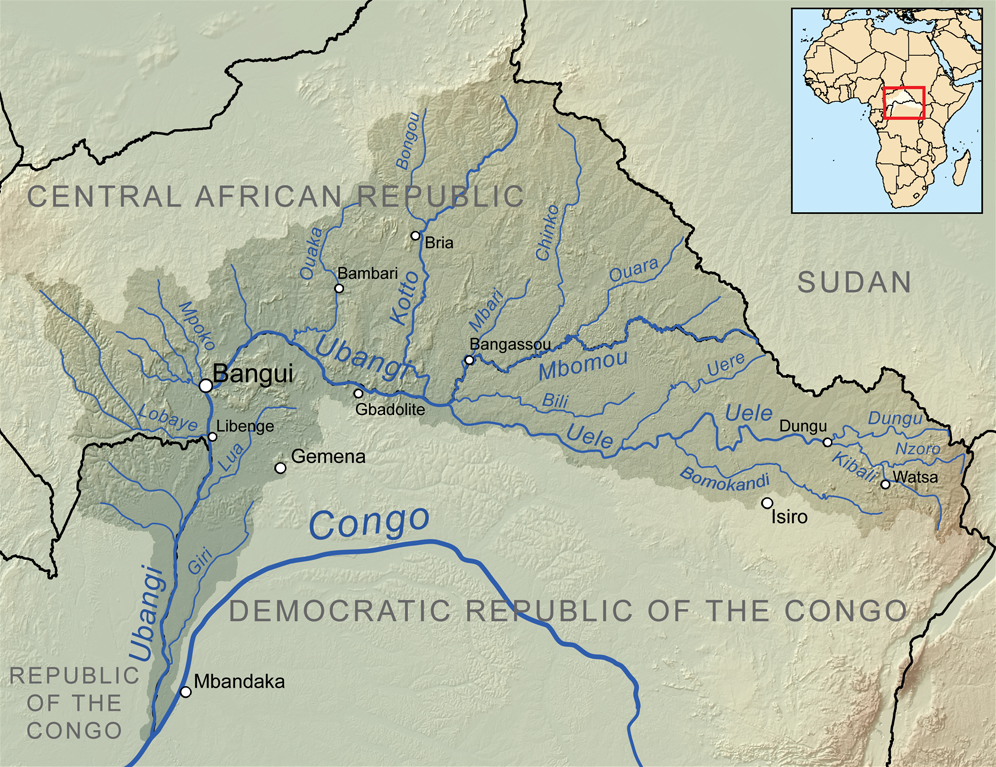
- Map showing the Uele River within the Ubangi River drainage basin.

- Location within Democratic Republic of the Congo

Physical characteristics
- Source
  - coordinates: 4°9′N 22°26′E

Basin features
- River system: Congo Basin

The Uele, also known by the phonetically identical Uélé, Ouélé, or Welle River, is a river in the Democratic Republic of the Congo.

== Course ==
The Uele forms at Dungu, at the confluence of the Dungu and Kibali rivers, which both originate in the mountains near Lake Albert. Combined these rivers flow west for about 1,210 kilometres (750 mi), until the Uele joins the Mbomou River at Yakoma. Main tributaries to the Uele river are the Bomokandi River (left side) and Uere River (right side).

The Uele–Mbomou confluence at Yakoma marks the origin of the Ubangi River, which in turn flows into the Congo River. The Uele is the longest tributary of the Ubangi. The combined Ubangi–Uele length is about 2,270 kilometres (1,410 mi).

From satellite images, parts of the river look red from the iron oxide contaminants in the river.

== Gallery ==
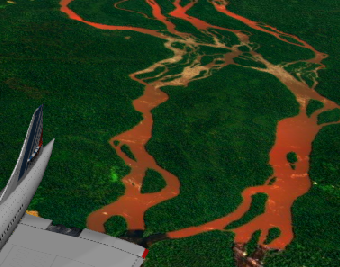
Aerial imagery showing the red color of the river.
