= Mayombe =

Geographic area on the west coast of Africa

Coordinates: 4.2538°S 13.4955°E

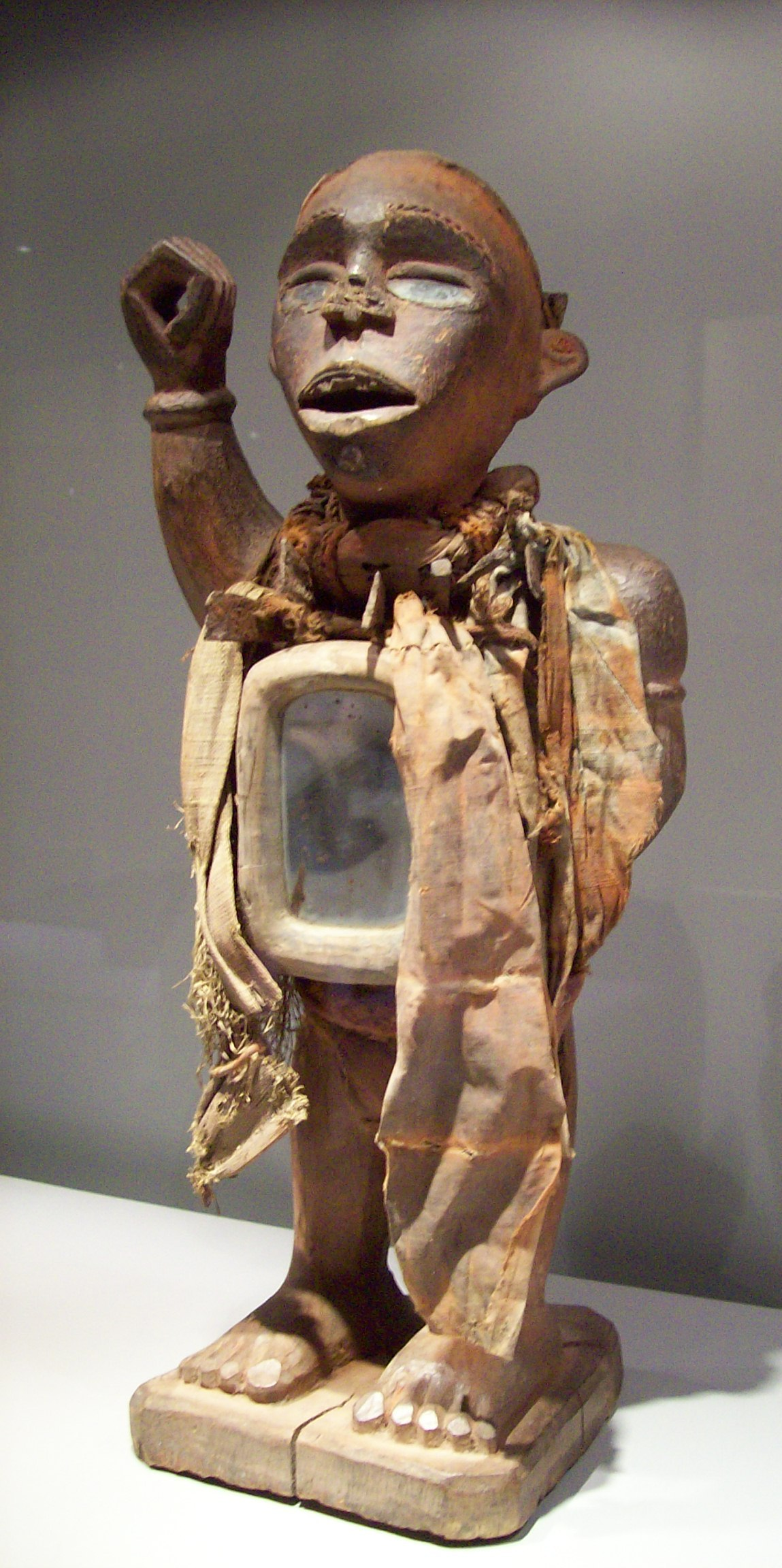
Fetish with mirror from Mayombe

Mayombe (or Mayumbe) is a geographic area on the western coast of Africa occupied by low mountains extending from the mouth of the Congo River in the south to the Kouilou-Niari River to the north. The area includes parts of the Democratic Republic of the Congo, Angola (Cabinda Province), the Republic of the Congo and Gabon. In the Democratic Republic of the Congo, Mayombe is part of the north-western province of Kongo Central on the right bank of the River Congo, and contains the cities and towns of Lukula, Seke Banza, Kangu and Tshela.

== Physical geography ==
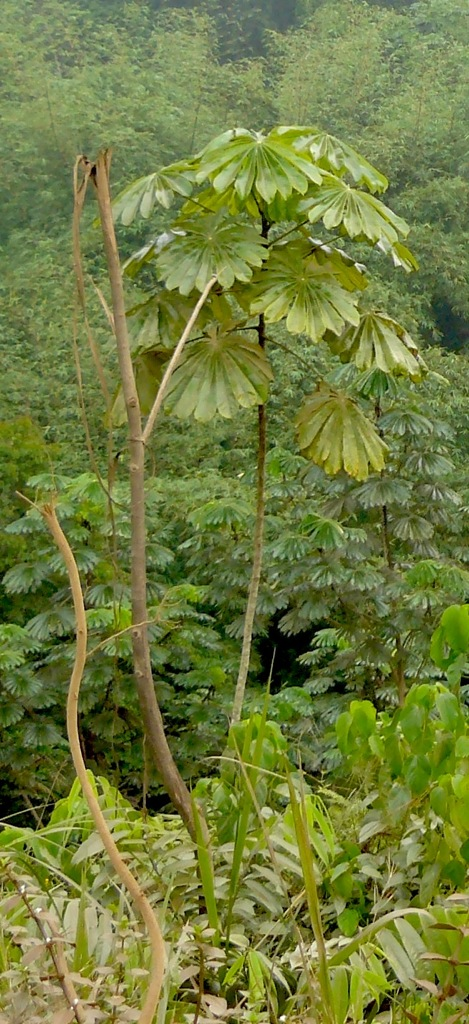
Umbrella tree (Musanga cecropioides) in the Mayombe forest

Mayumbe is located in the west of the Democratic Republic of the Congo. It lies on the right bank of the Congo River (the world's second largest) just before it empties into the Atlantic Ocean at Banana. It extends north from Boma into the Angolan enclave of Cabinda to the west and extends north to the Republic of Congo and Gabon.

Mayumbe is watered by many rivers with swift currents in its hilly and mountainous regions. The three largest are the Shiloango River and two of its main tributaries, the Lukula River and the Lubuzi River.

The main peaks are:

- Mount Foungouti, 930 m
- Mount Bamba, 810 m
- Kinoumbou Mountains, 784 m
- Ngouedi Mountains, 780 m
- Kanga Mountains, 764 m
- Mount Bombo, 751 m
- Pic Kiama, 747 m

== Climate and ecology ==
Mayumbe is south of the equator in the equatorial zone with oceanic influence and has two main seasons. The long dry season from June to September in the Mayumbe is not as intense as in the rest of the Lower Congo because of the altitude and the influence of the forest. Temperatures range from 17 to 22, but can drop to 8 ° at night. Nights can be quite cool. The long rainy season lasts from October to May, with temperatures of 28-33°. The climate is hot and humid, especially during the rainy season when the humidity is near to 100%. This feeling of constant humidity is further increased by the condensation of the vapors of the trade winds that cool the cliffs of the Coastal Range.

Flora vary from dense forest to savannah dotted with forest trees. The forests of Mayumbe are old. Some of the trees are valuable, especially the Limba. Palm trees are plentiful in the Elais Mayumbe and are found in forests and in the savanna. They form one of the great resources of this region for its inhabitants. The area's forests were estimated in 1950 to cover 500,000 hectares (1,200,000 acres). More recently they have declined to 80,000 hectares (200,000 acres), of which Limba account for over 40%.

== People ==
Among the ethnic groups that inhabit this region the Yombe, a subset of the Kongo people, are the most numerous.

Mayombe is famous in Senegal because it is an important place of exile of the founder of Mouridism, Cheikh Ahmadou Bamba, during the French colonial administration. He remained there for five years.

== Railway ==
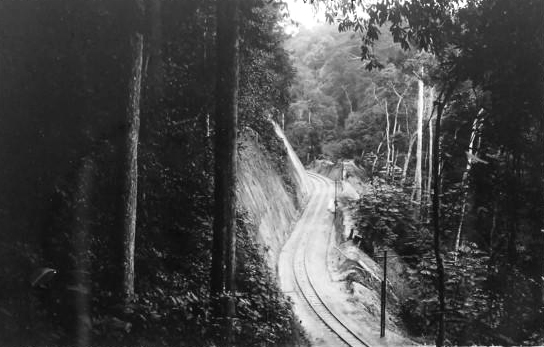
The Mayumbe railway, August 1930

The Mayombe Railway linked Boma to Tshela, with a planned extension to the Republic of Congo. It was dismantled under President Mobutu Sese Seko and the tracks were reused near Gbadolite. The Mayombe in Congo is covered by the Congo-Ocean Railway.

== See also ==
- Mayombe National Alliance

== External sources ==
- (in French) Léo Bittremieux, La société secrète des Bakhimba au Mayombe, G. van Campenhout, Bruxelles, 1936, 327 p.
- (in French) H. de Foresta (et al.), « Un premier site de métallurgie de l'Age du Fer Ancien (2.110 BP) dans le Mayombe congolais et ses implications sur la dynamique des éco-systèmes », in Bulletin de liaison des archéologues du monde Bantu (Libreville), n° 7, 1990, p. 10-12
- (in French) M. Fuchs, « Le Mayombe », in Bulletin de la Société Royale Belge de Géographie, 19 (1) 1895, p. 5-23
- (in French) François Pellegrin, La flore du Mayombe : d'après les récoltes de M. Georges le Testu (2^{e} partie), Impr. E. Lanier, Caen, 1928, 83 p.
- (in French) Dominique Schwartz (et al.), « Un site de fonte du fer récent (300 bp) et original dans le Mayombe congolais : Ganda-Kimpesse », in Bulletin de liaison des archéologues du monde Bantu (Libreville), 8/9, 1991, p. 33-40
- (in French) Jacques Sénéchal, Matuka Kabala et Frédéric Fournier, Revue des connaissances sur le Mayombe : synthèse préparée pour le Projet PNUD/UNESCO, PRC/85/002 et PRC/88/003, UNESCO, 1989, 343 p.
- (in Dutch) Léo Bittremieux, Mayombsche volkskunst, De Vlaamsche Boekenhalle, Louvain, 1924, 227 p.
