= Bas-Fleuve District =

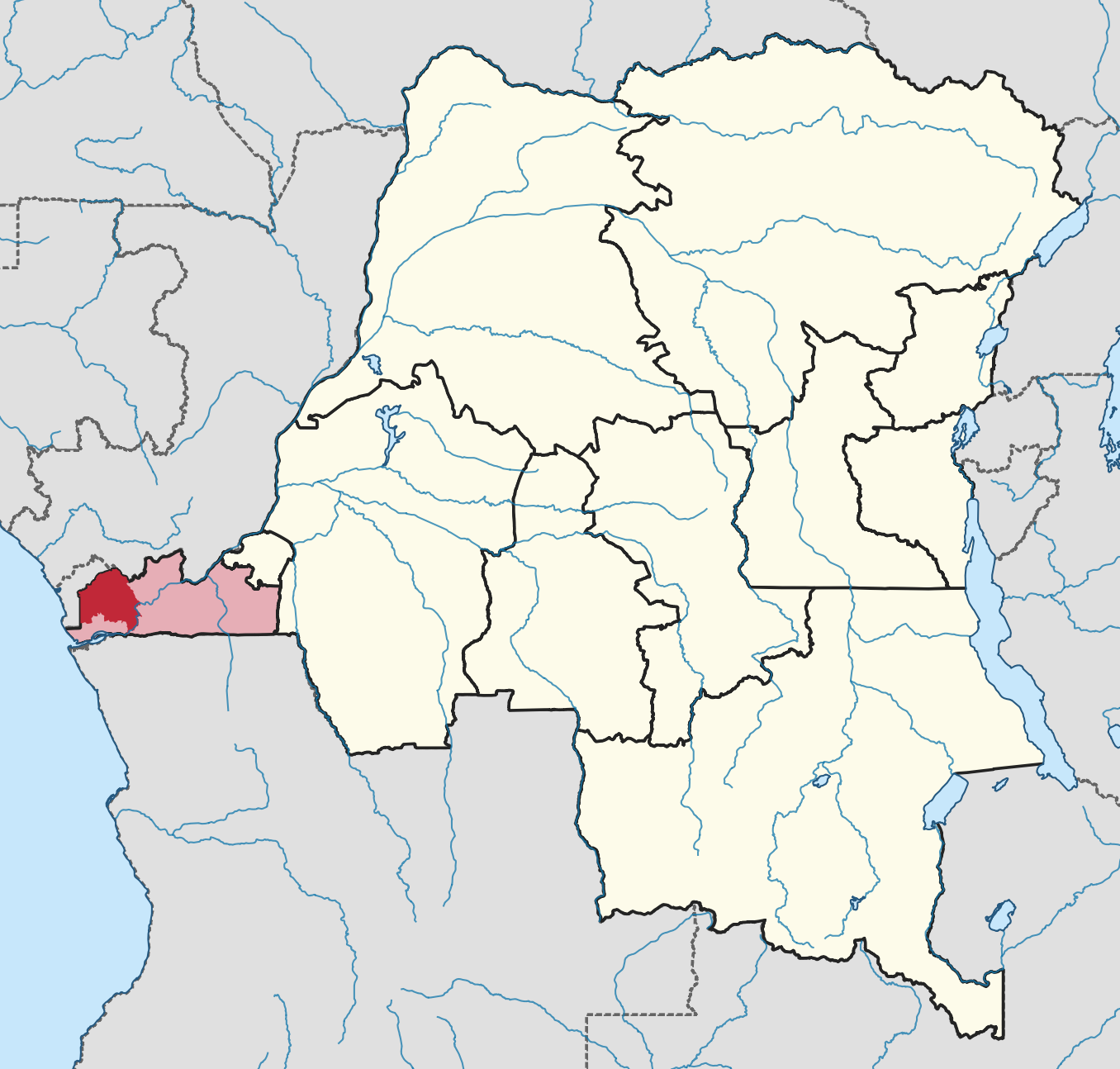
- Bas-Fleuve district of Kongo-Central province (2014)
- Coordinates: 5.008867°S 12.960434°E
- Country: Democratic Republic of Congo
- Province: Kongo Central

Bas-Fleuve District was a district located in the Kongo Central province, in the Democratic Republic of the Congo. It included the Tshela, Lukula and Seke-Banza territories.
