= Madimba Territory =

Madimba
- Territory
- Territoire de Madimba
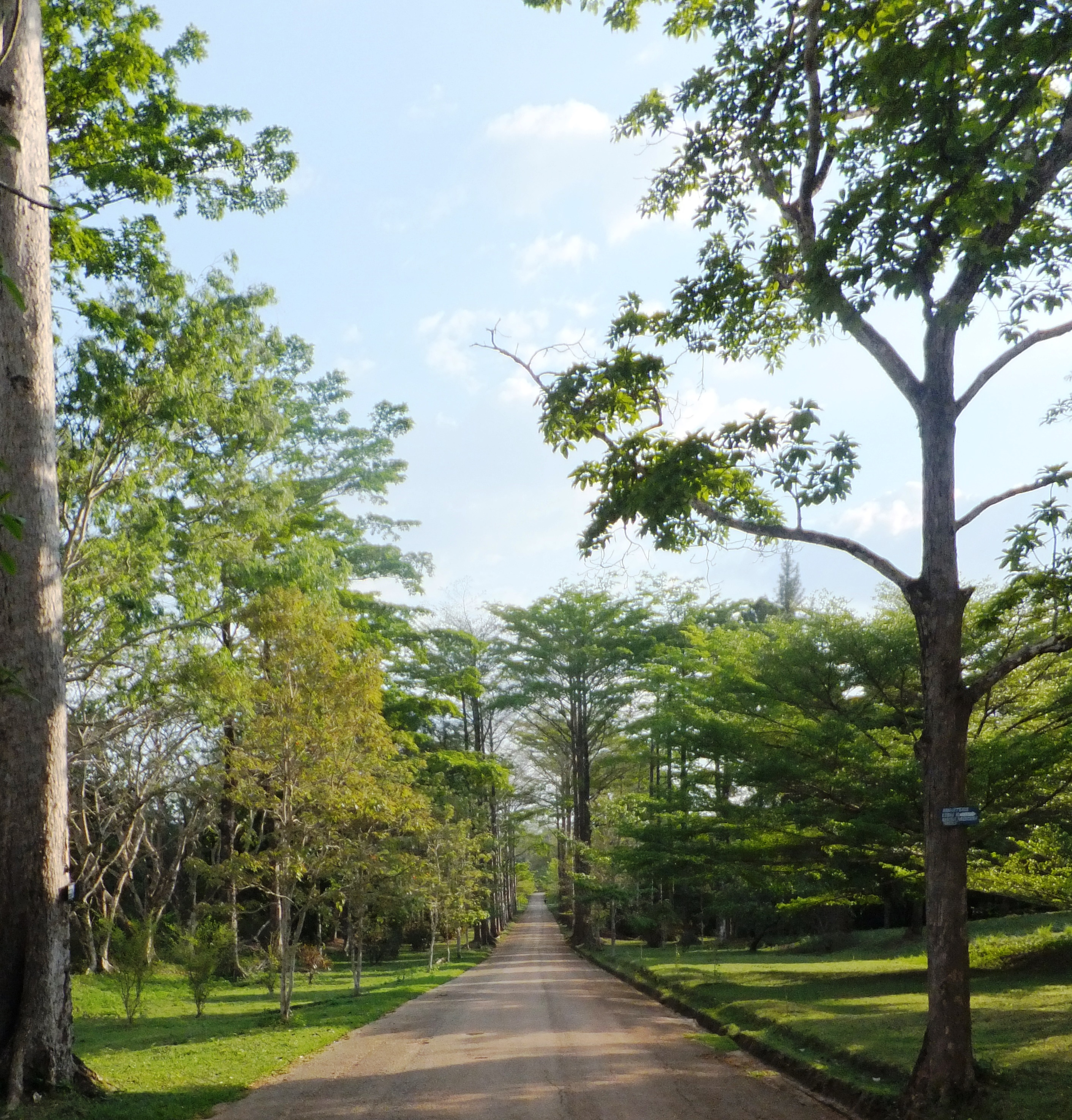
- Interactive map of Madimba
- Location in DR Congo
- Coordinates: 5.364°S 15.536°E
- Country: DR Congo
- Province: Kongo Central
- Capital: Madimba

Government
  - Administrator: Alphonsine Ngombe

Area
  - Total: 8,260 km^{2} (3,190 sq mi)

Population (2016 est.)
  - Total: 463,132
  - Density: 56.1/km^{2} (145/sq mi)
- Time zone: UTC+1 (WAT)
- Official language: French
- National language: Kikongo
- Climate: Cfa

Madimba Territory is a territory in the Kongo Central province of the Democratic Republic of the Congo. Its seat is the town of Madimba. The region covers an area of 8,260 square miles and is situated 100 km from Kinshasa. It spans from the Lukusu River in the north to Kintano in the west, and from the Inkisi River in the west to Kinkosi-Luidi in the southeast. The territory borders Kasangulu Territory to the northeast, Kimvula Territory to the southeast, Mbanza-Ngungu Territory to the west, and Angola to the south. Madimba Territory has an estimated population of 463,132 people as of 2016 and is administratively subdivided into six sectors: Luidi, Mfidi Malele, Mfuma-Kibambi, Ngeba, Ngufu, and Wungu.

Madimba Territory is home to the Kisantu Botanical Garden (Jardin botanique de Kisantu), one of the largest botanical gardens in Central Africa. The Hôpital Saint-Luc, situated on the Nkandu plateau in Inkisi, is the region's first established medical facility. Madimba Territory houses several higher-educational institutions, including Kubama College (Collège Kubama), Institut Technique Industriel de Kisantu (ITI-Kisantu), and Institut Luymas. The territory is also home to Mbuela-Lodge, a holiday resort located near the town of Kisantu.

== Geography ==
Madimba Territory is located approximately 100 kilometers southwest of Kinshasa in the Kongo Central province. It forms part of the Lukaya District and was officially created through General Administration Ordinance No. 40/2 issued on 1 February 1913. The territory is connected by nearly 946 kilometers of roads and stretches from the Lukusu River in the north to the locality of Kintano in the west, while extending eastward from the Inkisi River to Kinkosi Luidi in the southeast. It shares boundaries with Kasangulu Territory to the northeast, Kimvula Territory to the southeast, Mbanza-Ngungu Territory to the west, and Angola along its southern frontier. The population is predominantly young, with an average density estimated at 55 inhabitants per square kilometer.

The territory experiences a humid subtropical climate, with distinct wet and dry seasons throughout the year. Rainfall is concentrated during a seven-month rainy period that extends from September to January, with a resumption in April and May. The dry season lasts five months and includes a shorter dry interval in February and March as well as a more pronounced dry period between June and August. Temperatures generally fluctuate between 20°C and 30°C, while annual precipitation ranges from 1,200 to 1,600 millimeters.

Geologically, the territory is characterized by soils composed largely of sandy clay and clay mixed with sand. Its physical landscape is dominated by low hills, valleys, and plateaus. Besides the Inkisi River, which crosses the territory, the northern section is influenced by the Congo River basin. Madimba Territory is also crossed by several rivers and streams, notably the Lukusu, Luidi, Mfidi, Ngufu, Geba, Wungu, Nsele, Tau, Luvu, Lukunga, and Bongolo rivers.

=== Administrative divisions ===
Madimba Territory is administratively divided into six sectors:

- Luidi (or Kinkosi)
- Mfidi Malele
- Mfuma-Kibambi
- Ngeba
- Ngufu
- Wungu (south of Ngeba, north of Mfidi Malele)

== Demographics ==
=== Population and religion ===
Madimba Territory had an estimated population of 475402 as of 2016. French is used as the official administrative language, whereas Kikongo is the most widely spoken national language among the population. Kikongo exists in several dialect forms, with Kintandu representing roughly 65%, Kimbeku about 20%, and Kimbata around 15%, in addition to other varieties such as Kimpangu, Kimpesi, Kinganu, and Kidiki-diki. Kintandu is prevalent in Ngeba and Ngufu, Kimbata in Mfidi, Kimbeku in Luidi, Kimpangu in Wungu, and Kimpesi in Luidi and Mfuma, while Kinganu and Kidiki-diki are also spoken in Luidi and Mfuma sectors. Lingala is commonly used in the larger towns and in villages located along the national roads.

The population includes Protestants, Catholics, revivalist churches, Muslims, and Kimbanguists, alongside adherents of various traditional or syncretic belief systems such as Mpeve ya Longo, animism, and Fikambi-kambi. One of the local religious movements, known as Ecuse, is believed to have originated in Madimba Territory.

=== Health ===
The territory is divided into three health zones (zones de santé) and contains three general referral hospitals (hôpitaux généraux de référence). The Kisantu health zone is served by Hôpital Saint Luc Kisantu as its general referral hospital and includes 43 health centers (centres de santé). Established in 1922, Saint Luc Kisantu Hospital is a Catholic faith-based institution managed by the Diocese of Kisantu. Roughly 80 km away in the Mfidi sector, the Ngidinga health zone covers an estimated 158,010 residents from the Wungu, Mfidi, and Luidi sectors. It includes 15 health centres, with Ngidinga Hospital serving as the general referral hospital. It was established in 1982 and is a Catholic-convention hospital managed by the Congregation of the Sisters of Our Lady of Namur.

The Nselo health zone, located between the Ngeba and Mfuma Kibambi sectors, is served by CBCO Nselo Hospital, a Protestant faith-based general referral hospital. The zone includes 11 health centres.

Pharmaceutical supply in rural health zones is supported by CAAMEKI (Centrale d'Achats et d'Approvisionnement en Médicaments Essentiels de Kisantu), which supplies essential medicines to 12 health zones within Kongo Central.

=== Education ===
==== Primary and secondary education ====
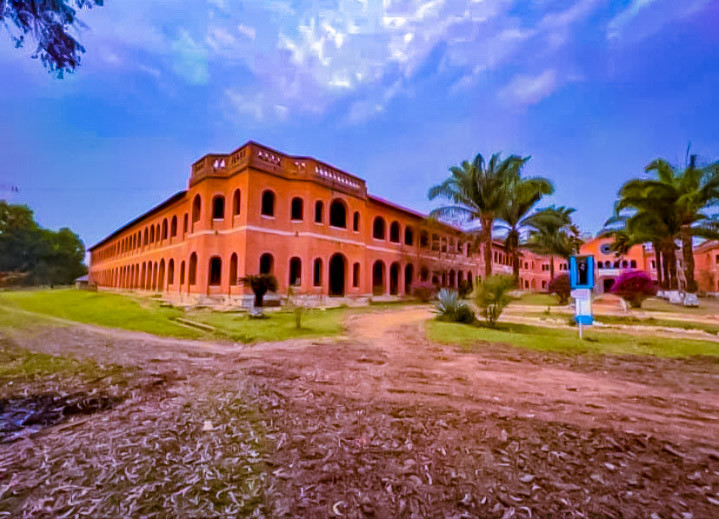
View of Petit Séminaire Saint Jean-Berchmans de Lemfu, a school in the Diocese of Kisantu

Madimba Territory has 245 primary schools and 143 secondary schools. The education system comprises public schools, state-approved private schools, and faith-based institutions (Catholic, Protestant, Salvationist, and Kimbanguist). All institutions are supervised by the Madimba Territory education sub-division. Despite infrastructural challenges, particularly in remote areas where school buildings are often constructed with non-durable materials, educational quality and academic performance remain central priorities for teaching staff. At the secondary level, male enrolment exceeds female enrolment. This gender disparity is more pronounced in rural areas and is attributed to early marriage, adolescent pregnancies, parental preference for educating boys, and inadequate sanitation infrastructure, all of which negatively affect girls' school attendance.

==== Higher and university education ====
The territory is historically significant in the development of higher education in Central Africa and is associated with the early establishment of the first school and university in the region, which later evolved into the University of Kinshasa.

Madimba Territory currently hosts one university and nine higher education institutes (instituts supérieurs). These institutions are administered by designated heads and include public and accredited private establishments. Most are located in Ngeba. Academic programs cover a wide range of disciplines, including medicine, humanities, agronomy, nursing, applied sciences, fashion and tailoring, rural development, community health, construction, business and administrative science, and educational guidance. Teaching is generally conducted on a full-time basis, but academic schedules are often disrupted due to staff shortages and dependence on lecturers who work primarily at other institutions, such as the University of Kinshasa. This leads to prolonged academic years, sometimes lasting 12 to 14 months or more, particularly in medical programs. By 2017, a vocational training school had been completed in Kisantu (former Kintanu area) using durable materials, with support from the provincial government.

== History ==
Madimba Territory is among the oldest administrative territories established in the Democratic Republic of the Congo. It was officially created by the Ordinance of 1 February 1913 under the authority of the colonial governor-general. At the time of its establishment, the territory was divided into six sectors: Luidi, Ngeba, Mfidi-Malele, Ngufu, Mfuma, and Wungu.

In April 2007, torrential downpours caused the destruction of around thirty houses and affected two primary schools in Ngufu, which created a humanitarian crisis in nearby villages, including Kipaku, Kituengi, Kisundi, and Kilemfu. The disaster left 196 people homeless, including 65 adults and 131 children. On 25 March 2011, a traffic accident on the Kisantu–Simula road resulted in the deaths of two people and injuries to fourteen others after a large truck from Madimba Territory overturned near Kisantu, more than 200 kilometres east of Matadi.

On 14 September 2022, a tanker truck explosion in Mbuba, within Madimba Territory, caused the deaths of eight people and left twenty others with burn injuries. The accident happened after the tanker overturned following a collision with a heavy-duty vehicle. Fuel began leaking from the tanker, which attracted local residents who attempted to collect the gasoline. The tanker subsequently exploded and instantly killed eight people, including a soldier of the Republican Guard responsible for securing the SEP-Congo pipeline. The death toll later increased to ten by 17 September.

== Economy ==
=== Agriculture ===
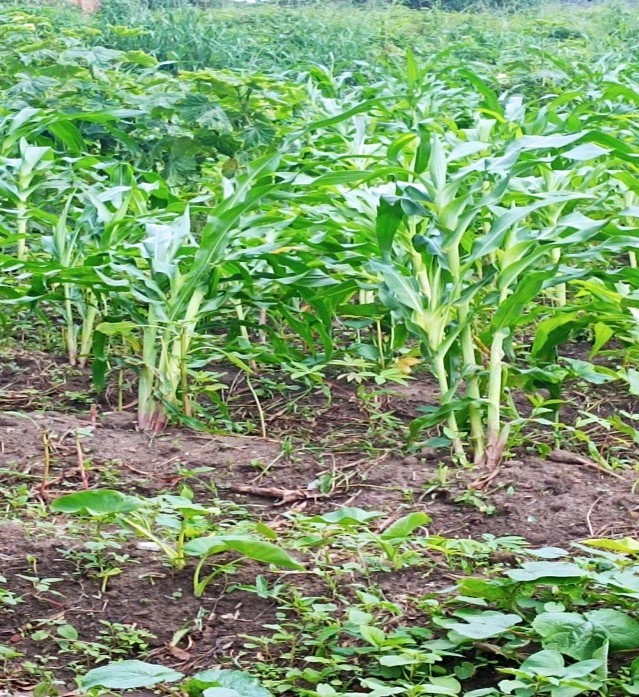
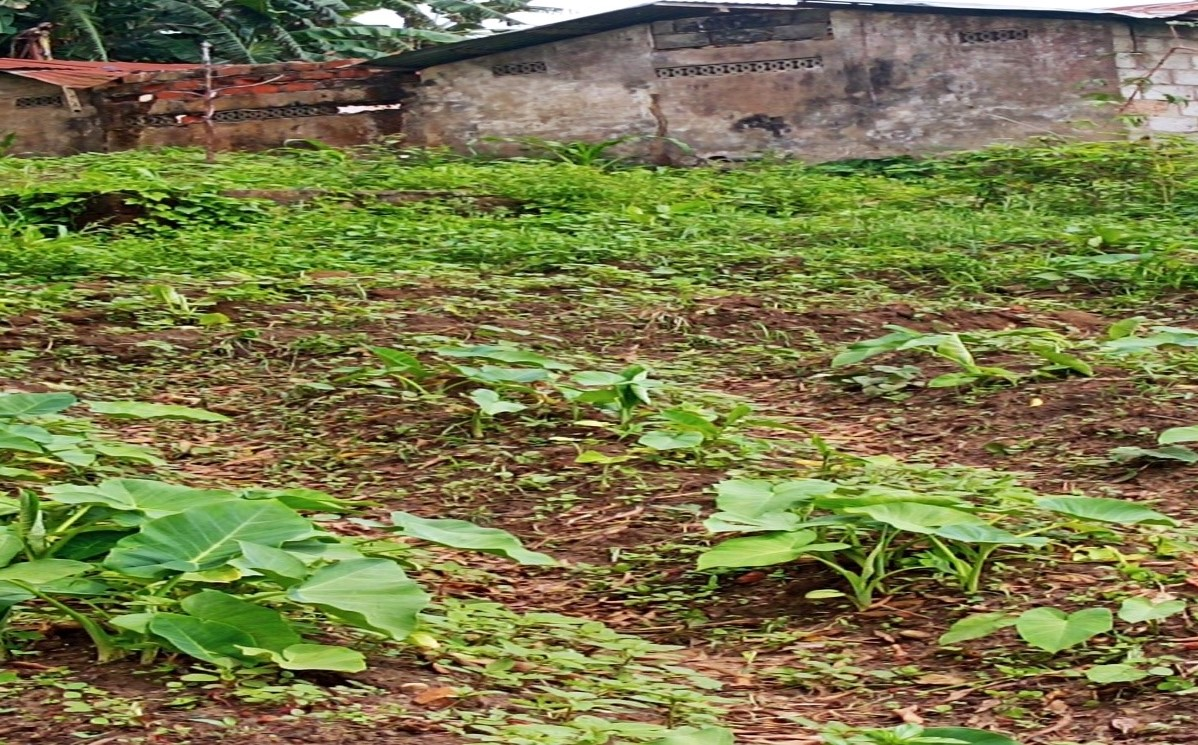
Maize fields in Ngeba

The economy of the territory is largely sustained by subsistence farming, which forms the main source of livelihood for most households. Livestock farming is practiced on a small scale, including poultry rearing as well as goats and sheep, while cattle are mainly owned by wealthier families. Agricultural output is dominated by cassava, peanuts, maize, beans, and a variety of vegetables produced through market gardening. Peanuts are widely grown and commonly processed into paste, used in local cuisine, particularly in dishes such as fumbwa. Maize production is concentrated in Ngufu and Kinkosi Luidi, where it is consumed boiled or roasted, with excess harvests being sold in local markets and to traders. Vegetables are cultivated across the territory and are an important source of income for smallholder farmers. Cassava is the principal staple crop, with about 60% processed into chikwangue and the remainder converted into flour.

=== Mining, timber exploitation, micro-enterprises, and construction materials ===
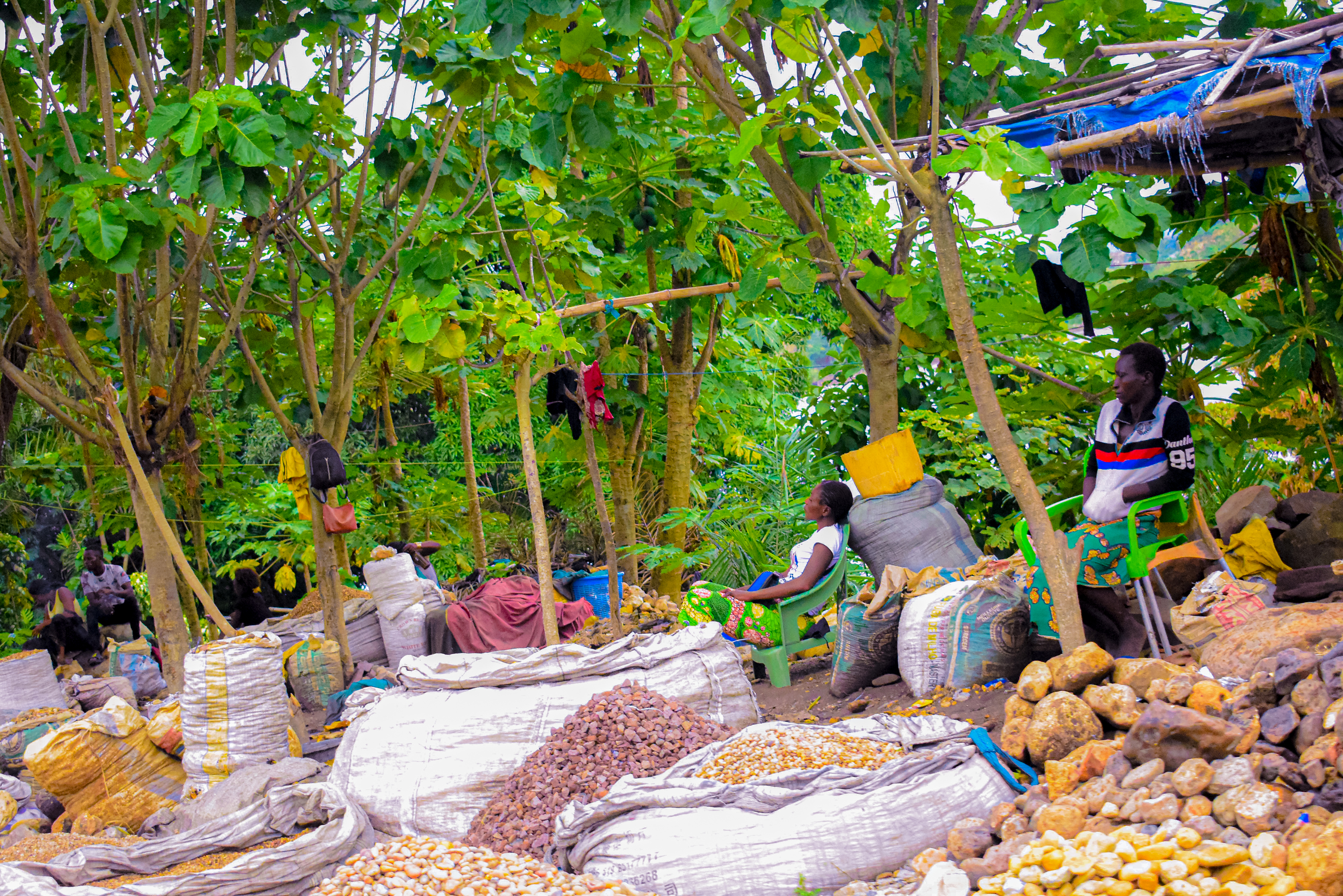
Gravel vendors along the Congo River in Mimoza

The territory also produces construction and natural materials such as crushed stone (rubble masonry), gravel (caillasses), lime, timber, and sand. The territory has considerable mineral resources, including copper and zinc deposits in Ngufu and iron ore in Ngeba, though these remain unexploited. Limestone found along the Ngufu and Ngeba rivers is extracted artisanally for the production of gravel, crushed stone, and lime used in construction. However, limestone deposits also create some minor issues, as traces are sometimes detected in Kisantu's drinking water despite treatment by REGIDESO. Timber exploitation is significant due to limited electrification in many sectors. Wood collected during land clearing is either sold to urban centers such as Kinshasa or used locally for fuel, with much of it converted into charcoal.

The arrival of mobile telecommunications companies has also created opportunities for youth involvement in informal businesses, especially through operating public call booths and selling prepaid SIM cards and communication products. These small and medium-sized enterprises generally function with minimal equipment and focus on goods and services intended for local markets. Industrial development in other sectors remains slow due to shortages of raw materials and restricted access to profitable markets. Commercial exchanges have nevertheless increased significantly due to the influence of the Lufu market in Angola, which has helped diversify products sold in markets across the territory.

=== Economic operators and financial services ===
Sala Minsiensi, a member of the Samin Group, operates in the construction industry and general trade. Kianfu specializes in cold storage services and beverage warehousing, while Sokin is involved in general commerce. Lemba works in cold storage and beverage distribution, while the Glory Group is active in the sale of food products and construction materials. Because of their turnover and scale of activity, these companies are considered among the principal drivers of commercial activity in Madimba Territory, as they supply most of the goods required by the population. Businesses that originally operated as wholesalers have increasingly moved into direct retail trade by offering slight reductions in prices. Consumers with limited purchasing power often change their purchasing locations in search of lower prices.

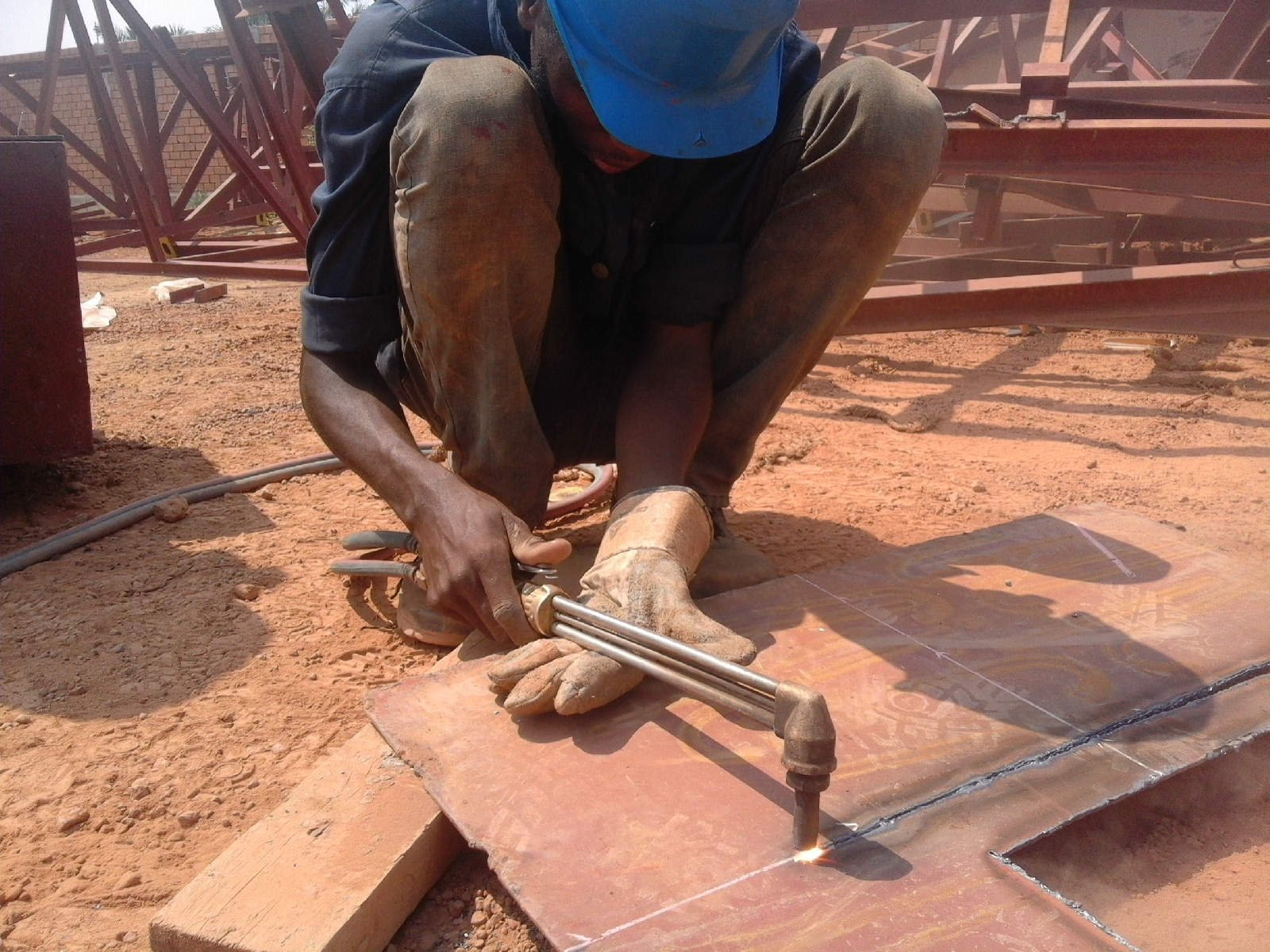
Industrial welder at a cement production facility in Kongo Central

Major enterprises in the territory include the Central African Graphic Arts Company (Société d'Arts graphiques d'Afrique Centrale; SODAC) and the Kisantu Bagging Company (Sacherie de Kisantu; SAKI), which manufactures packaging materials. Public institutions such as SNEL, REGIDESO, and Hôpital Saint Luc Kisantu are also among the largest enterprises operating in the territory. Due to weak market demand and difficulties operating heavy machinery efficiently, SODAC has progressively scaled down its operations and has effectively become a small-scale enterprise. SAKI has also ceased to function at full capacity. The company was previously dependent on the Lukala Cement Plant (Cimenterie de Lukala; CILU), its main customer for cement packaging, but declining production at CILU significantly reduced demand for SAKI's products.

Madimba Territory does not host any commercial or credit banks. There are only a limited number of money transfer agencies, estimated at about ten. The territory also contains 10 cooperatives, 15 development-oriented NGOs, 50 farmers' associations, and 22 mutual savings organizations. Among them is APEF (Action pour la protection des enfants et des femmes), which carries out literacy, awareness, and outreach programs while educating communities, especially rural populations, about the rights and responsibilities of women, men, and children. ACDS (Action communautaire pour le développement socio-économique) is active in several sectors. CEDEF, FAPDIK, and BDD/Kisantu focus mainly on improving the capacities of farmers' organizations in agriculture. Levain de Masses operates in gender and development issues as well as agroforestry activities. Other organizations include CETRAPAL (Centre de transformation de produits agricoles locaux) and FECOKI (Ferme communautaire de Kinsinga), which operates in agriculture and runs a small facility for producing cassava flour (micro-cossettes). Certain organizations provide low-interest credit services, while others focus on child sponsorship programs.

In agriculture, NGOs commonly organize women into cooperative groups, train them in modern cultivation methods, supply improved planting materials, and involve them in agricultural labor activities. Other NGOs are dedicated to promoting sanitation, hygiene, and environmental health initiatives.

=== Tourism ===
Notable tourist and cultural sites include the Kilweka cave in Ngeba, the nine ponds of Nzansanga, and the Mbuela Lodge tourist site. The territory is known for its scenic landscapes and recreational locations that attract visitors seeking relaxation and leisure.

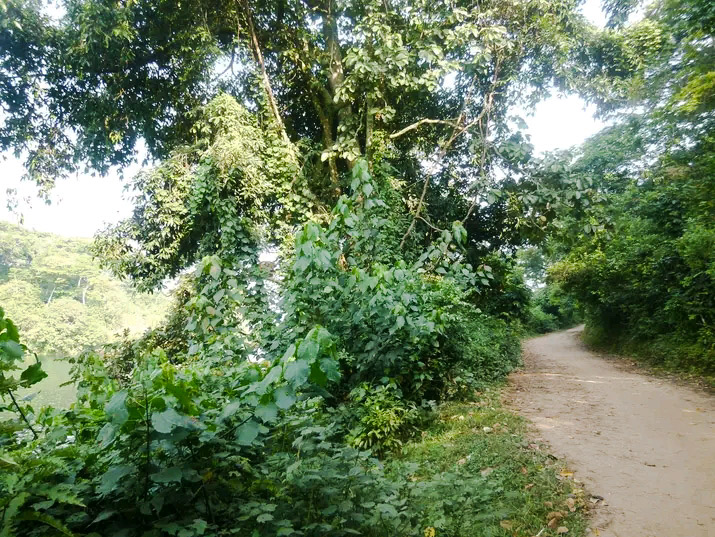
Mbuela Lodge in Kisantu

One of the Madimba Territory's most important attractions is the Kisantu Botanical Garden, the second-largest botanical garden in Africa. Located in a wetland area along the Inkisi River, the garden covers approximately 225 hectares, of which 80 hectares are landscaped. It is managed by the Institut Congolais pour la Conservation de la Nature (ICCN) and is known for its botanical diversity, and contains around 3,500 living plant species originating from different parts of the world. The site also includes a small zoo, approximately 125 kilometres of walking trails, and a pilgrimage site known as Calvary Place. It additionally contains Africa's oldest orchard of mangosteen trees introduced from Indonesia.

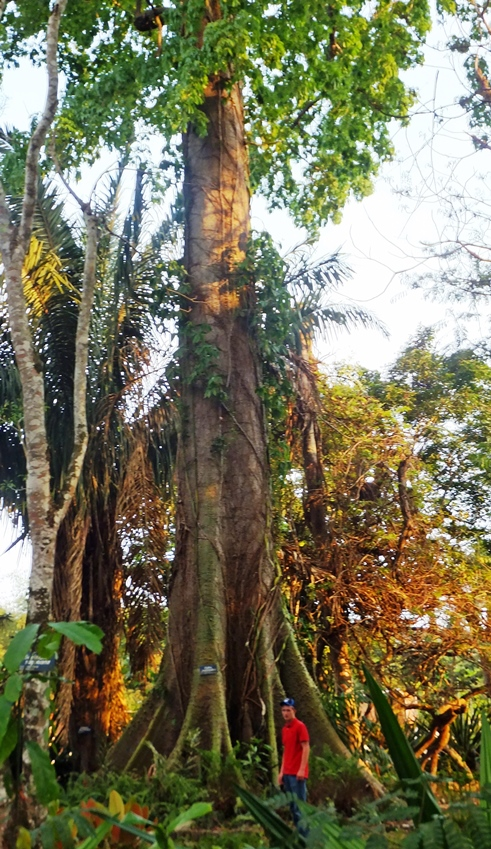
Kapok tree (silk-cotton tree) in the Kisantu Botanical Garden

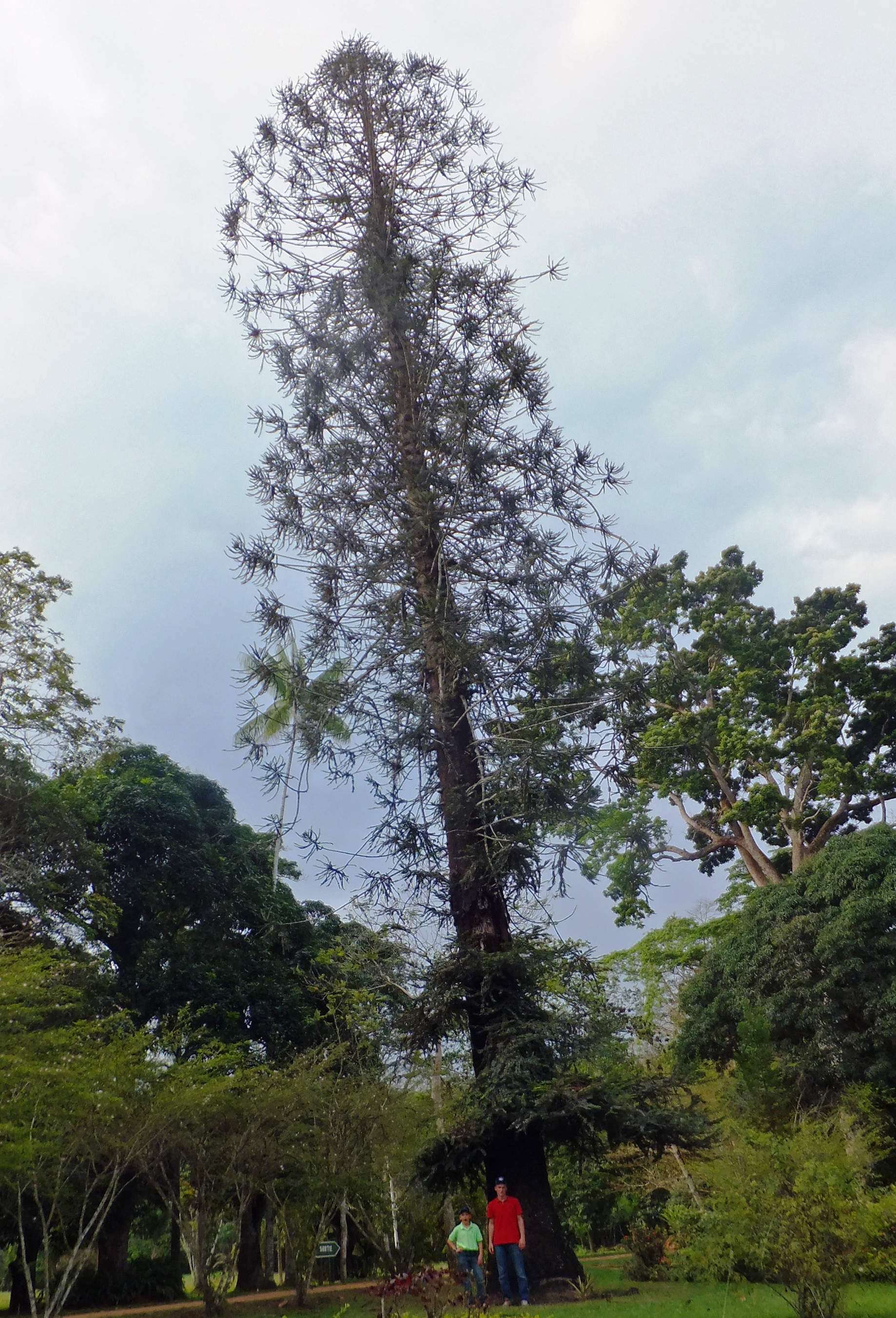
Araucaria, monkey puzzle tree in the Kisantu Botanical Garden

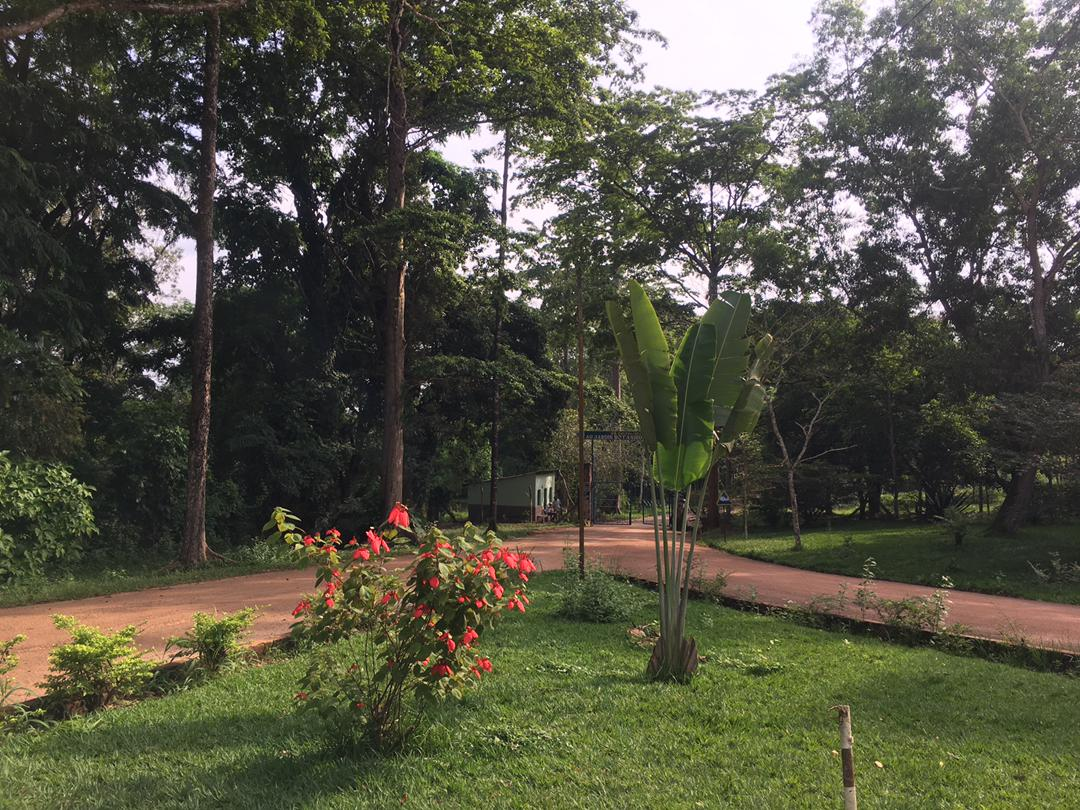
Floral species in the Kisantu Botanical Garden

The Kisantu Cathedral, inaugurated in September 1936, is constructed in the form of a Latin cross. Measuring approximately 11.5 meters in width, it is regarded as the second-largest cathedral in Central Africa by seating capacity, which accommodates up to 3,500 people.

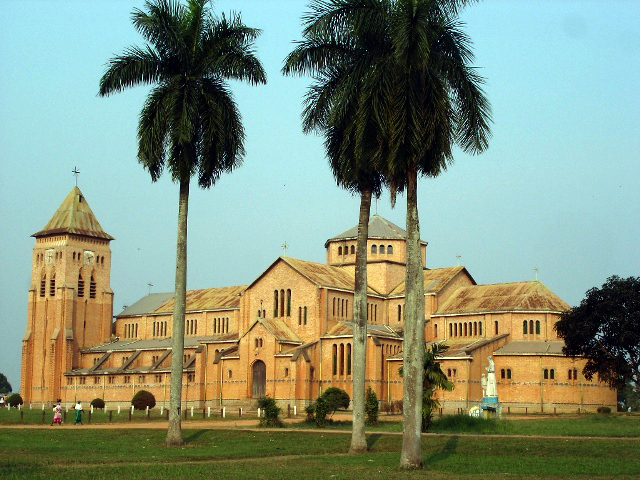
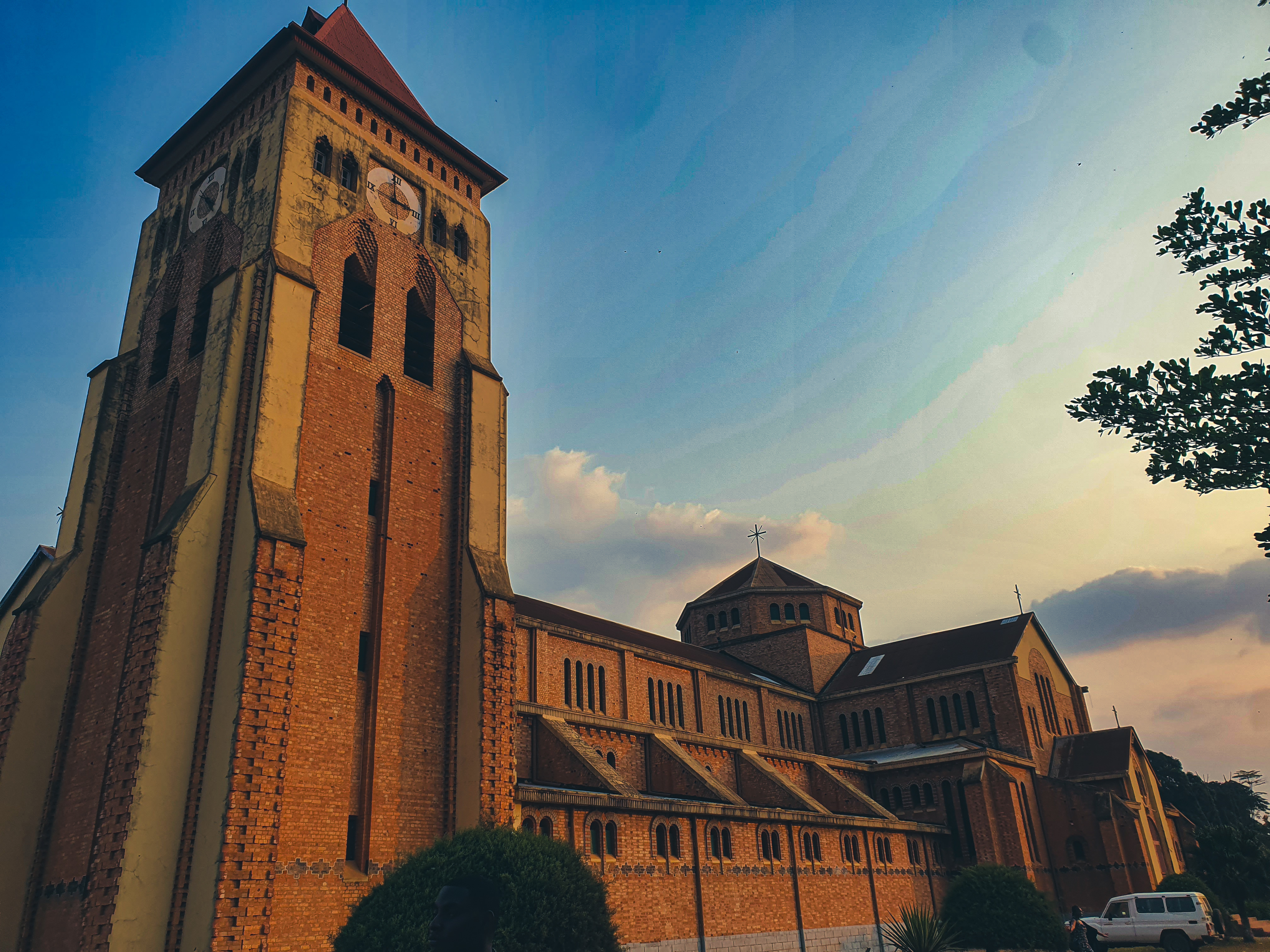
Kisantu Cathedral

Other tourist attractions include the Luguga Dam and the Kilemfu waterfalls, which flow into the Zongo Dam.

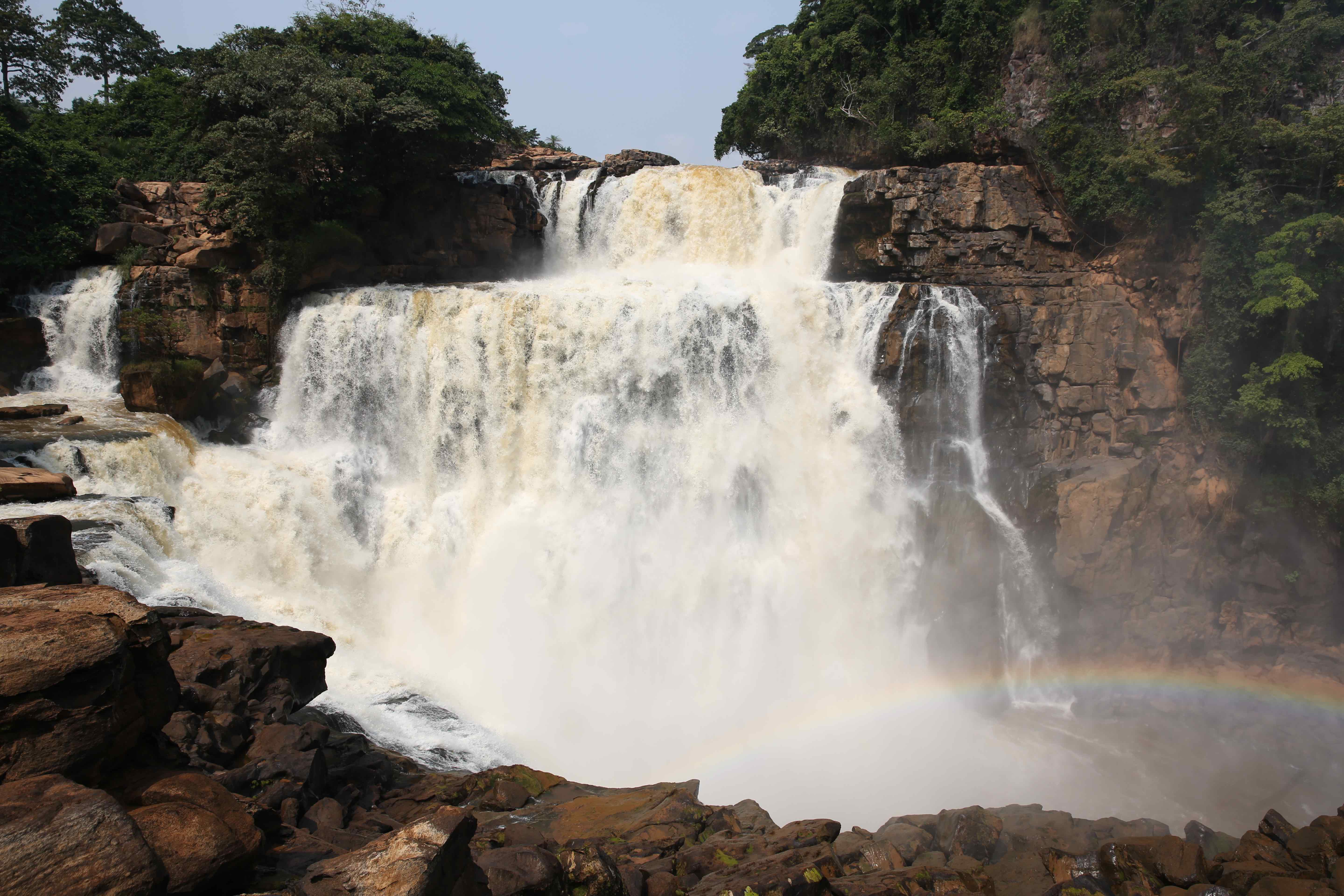
A view of the Zongo waterfalls on the Inkisi River, with foamy waters falling from a height of 65 meters

Sacred sites include the Age of Nsongi, a historic crossing point where residents once crossed the Inkisi River on foot, and the Cross of Mbatankulusi, a mysterious sword-like object fixed in the middle of the river.

Notable animal species found in the territory include crocodiles, baboons, turtles, pythons, gazelles, cane rats (chimbrik), and rats. Important plant species include frankincense, ficus benghalensis ("the walking tree"), hevea brasiliensis, ebony wood, approximately 200 tropical timber species, mangosteen trees, and ornamental plants.

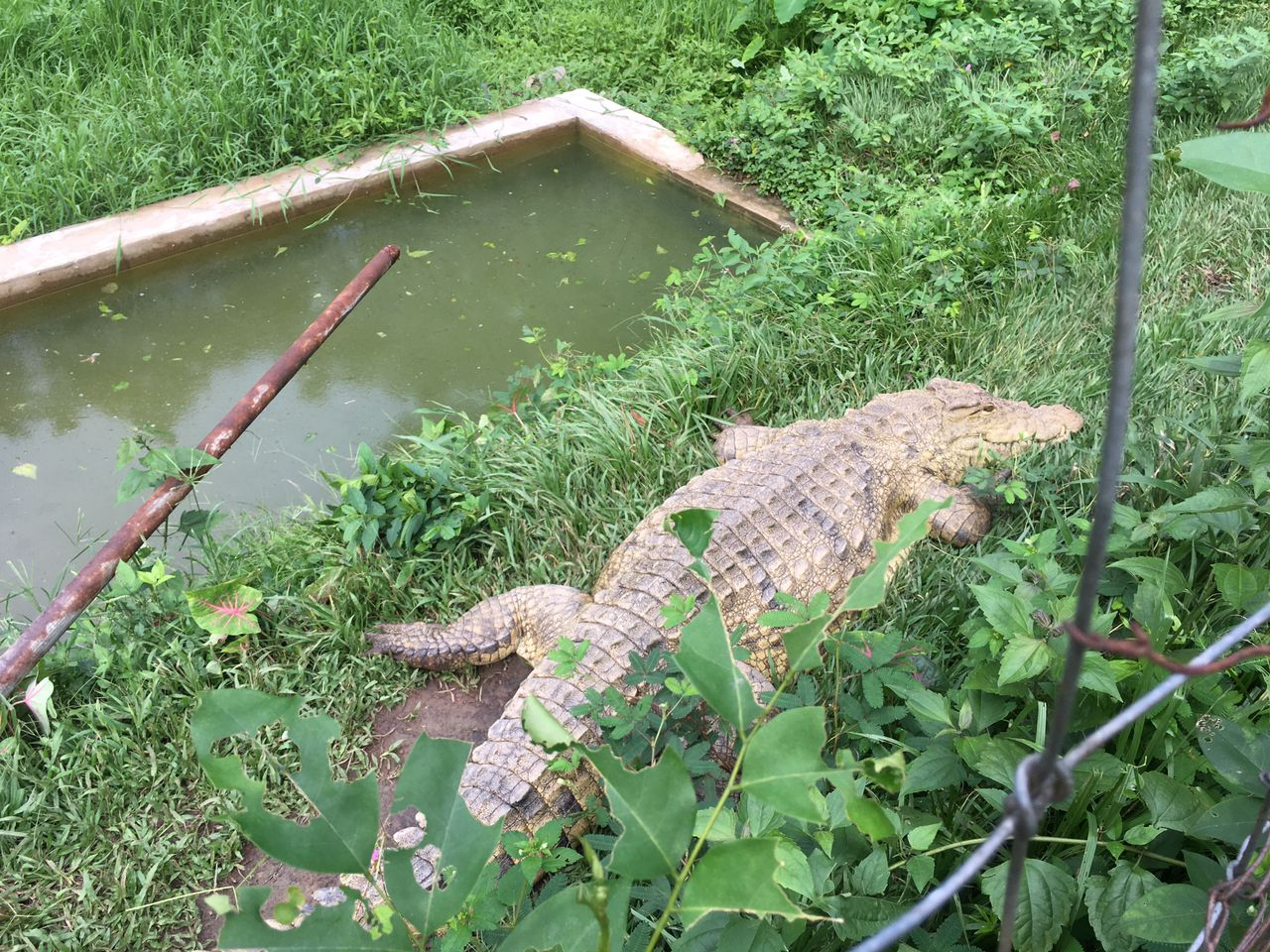
Crocodile housed in the Kisantu Botanical Garden

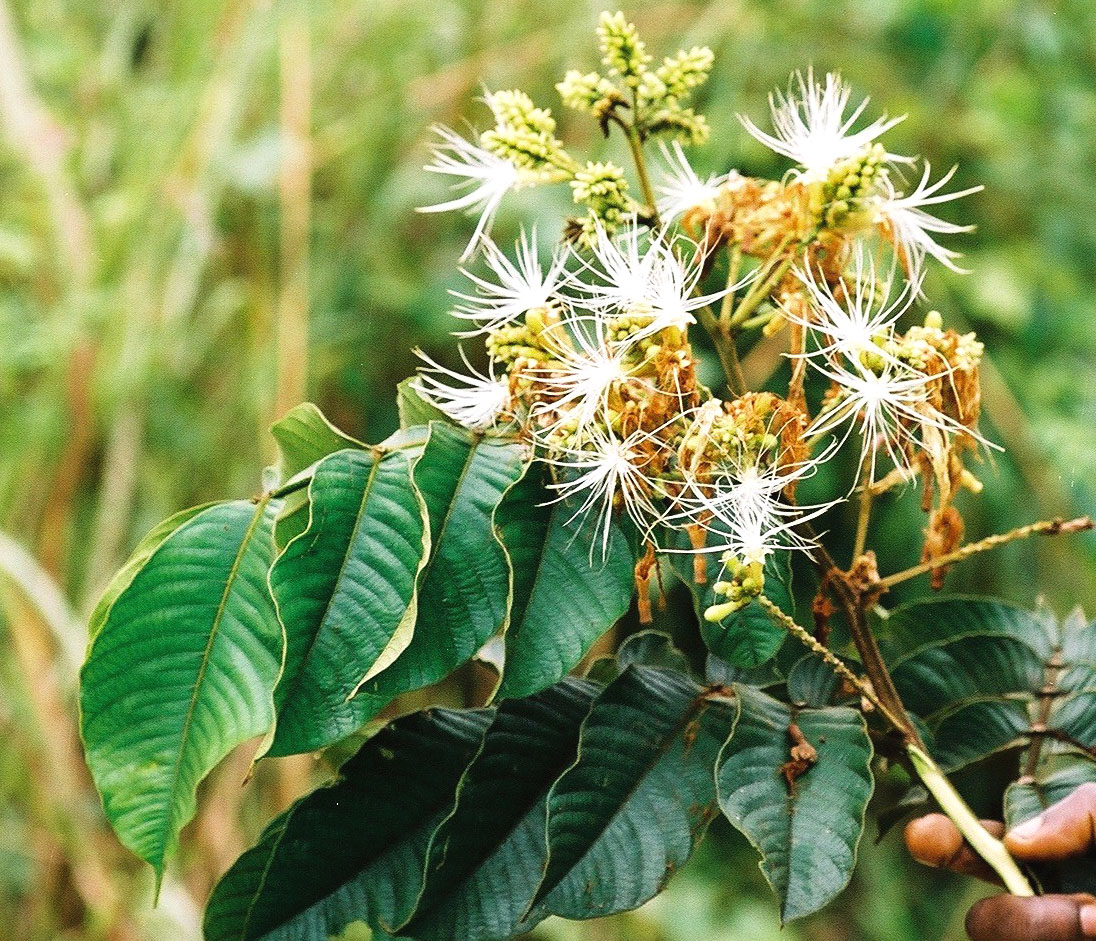
Flowering Inga edulis at the Kisantu Botanical Garden

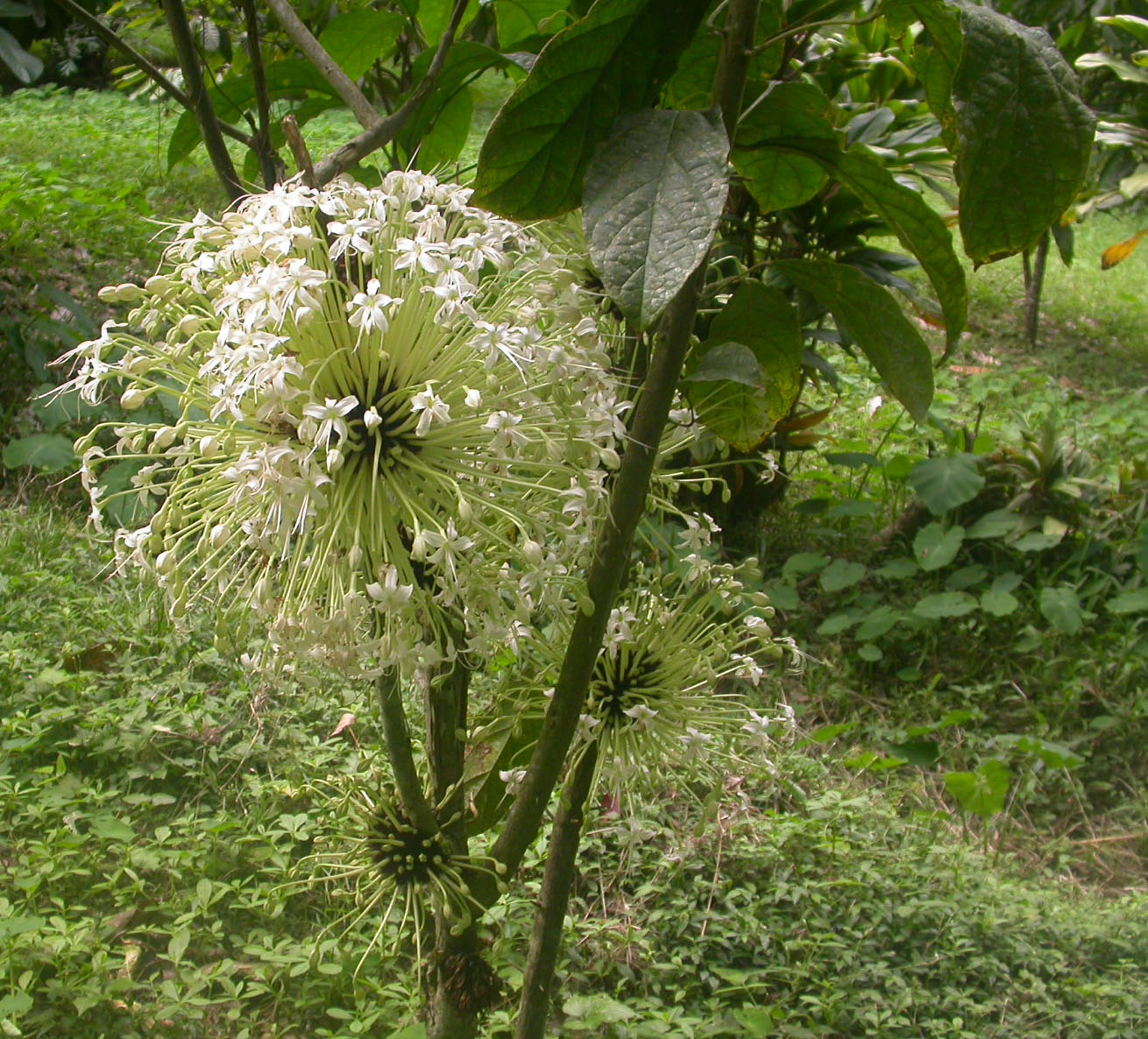
Specimen of clerodendrum globuliflorum in the Kisantu Botanical Garden

== Energy, transport, and telecommunications ==
The principal sources of energy include electricity, firewood, petroleum, generators, flashlights, and solar energy. Electricity supply is provided by the national electricity company, SNEL, although coverage remains largely limited to major urban centers and a small number of villages in Ngufu. In areas without access to the electrical grid, households mainly rely on firewood, flashlights, private generators, and solar panels. Solar energy, which was initially used mainly by private individuals, has become increasingly widespread in rural areas through the use of small-scale solar systems. These are commonly used for household lighting and for charging mobile phones. Petroleum products are also available throughout the territory, although their use has gradually declined over time. In November 2022, President Félix Tshisekedi inaugurated the electrification of the Mbanza-Mboma plateau. The initiative, led by alumni of Collège Notre-Dame de Mbanza-Mboma and backed by the President, himself a former student of the school, connected the Catholic mission and school facilities to the SNEL national power network.

Madimba Territory is accessible by road, rail, and river transport. The main road connections are National Road No. 1 (RN1), which links the territory with Kasangulu Territory and Mbanza-Ngungu Territory, and National Road No. 16 (RN16), which connects Madimba Territory to Kimvula Territory. Rail transport is facilitated by two operational railway stations, Madimba Central Station and Kisantu Station, which support trade and passenger transport between Kinshasa and Matadi. The territory is also accessible through the Inkisi River, which connects Mfidi, Wungu, Ngeba, Ngufu, and the former town of Kintano, with areas of Mbanza-Ngungu Territory such as Boko, Lunzadi, and Kivulu. River transport is particularly active on market days, when traders and farmers transport agricultural products such as cassava flour, peanuts, and tomatoes in exchange for consumer goods including soap, salt, vegetable oil, and other household goods.

Infrastructure development has been supported by the PRRR program under the management of the Office des Routes (OR). The program has focused on National Road 16 (RN16), an unpaved route linking Madimba Territory with Kimvula Territory. Rehabilitation works included the reconstruction of the Luwuwa Bridge (PK 30+100), the installation of reinforced concrete culverts, and the creation of a 23-kilometre diversion road during construction activities. However, rehabilitation work on RN16 has since been suspended because of insufficient funding.

The territory is covered by all major mobile telecommunications operators, although network quality varies across sectors and localities. Telecommunications services include the sale of prepaid SIM cards, airtime, and internet access. The main operators active in the territory include Vodacom Congo, Tigo RDC, Orange RDC, and Airtel RDC, all of which also provide mobile banking services such as M-Pesa, Tigo Cash, Orange Money, and Airtel Money.

== Culture ==
Traditional dialogue and public discussion, known as Kinzonzi (palaver), as well as respect for elders and ancestors, play a central role in community life. Matriarchy and monogamous marriage are the predominant social and marital systems practiced in the territory. Music is highly diverse and shares a common rhythmic foundation known as the Kintandu rhythm. In rural areas, the deceased are generally buried near family homes. Village chiefs and local heroes, individuals remembered for their bravery or significant contributions to the community, are often buried in front of their homes.
