= Provincial assembly =

Provincial assembly may refer to:

== Extant ==
=== Algeria ===
- People's Provincial Assembly, the political body governing the provinces of Algeria

=== Congo ===
- Provincial Assembly of Bas-Congo
- Provincial Assembly of Kinshasa
- Provincial Assembly of Maniema
- Provincial Assembly of Sud-Kivu

=== Nepal ===
- Provincial assemblies (Nepal) or Pradesh Sabha
- Koshi Provincial Assembly
- Madhesh Provincial Assembly
- Bagmati Provincial Assembly
- Gandaki Provincial Assembly
- Lumbini Provincial Assembly
- Karnali Provincial Assembly
- Sudurpashchim Provincial Assembly

=== Pakistan ===
- Provincial Assembly of Balochistan
- Provincial Assembly of Khyber Pakhtunkhwa
- Provincial Assembly of the Punjab
- Provincial Assembly of Sindh

=== Poland ===
- Voivodeship sejmik, or provincial assembly, a regional-level elected legislature in each of the voivodeships of Poland

== Defunct ==
- East Pakistan Provincial Assembly (1955-1971)
- Estonian Provincial Assembly (1917–1918)
- Pennsylvania Provincial Assembly (1681–1783)

== See also ==
- Member of the Provincial Assembly
- Provincial council (disambiguation)
