= Kinzau-Mvuete =

- Commune
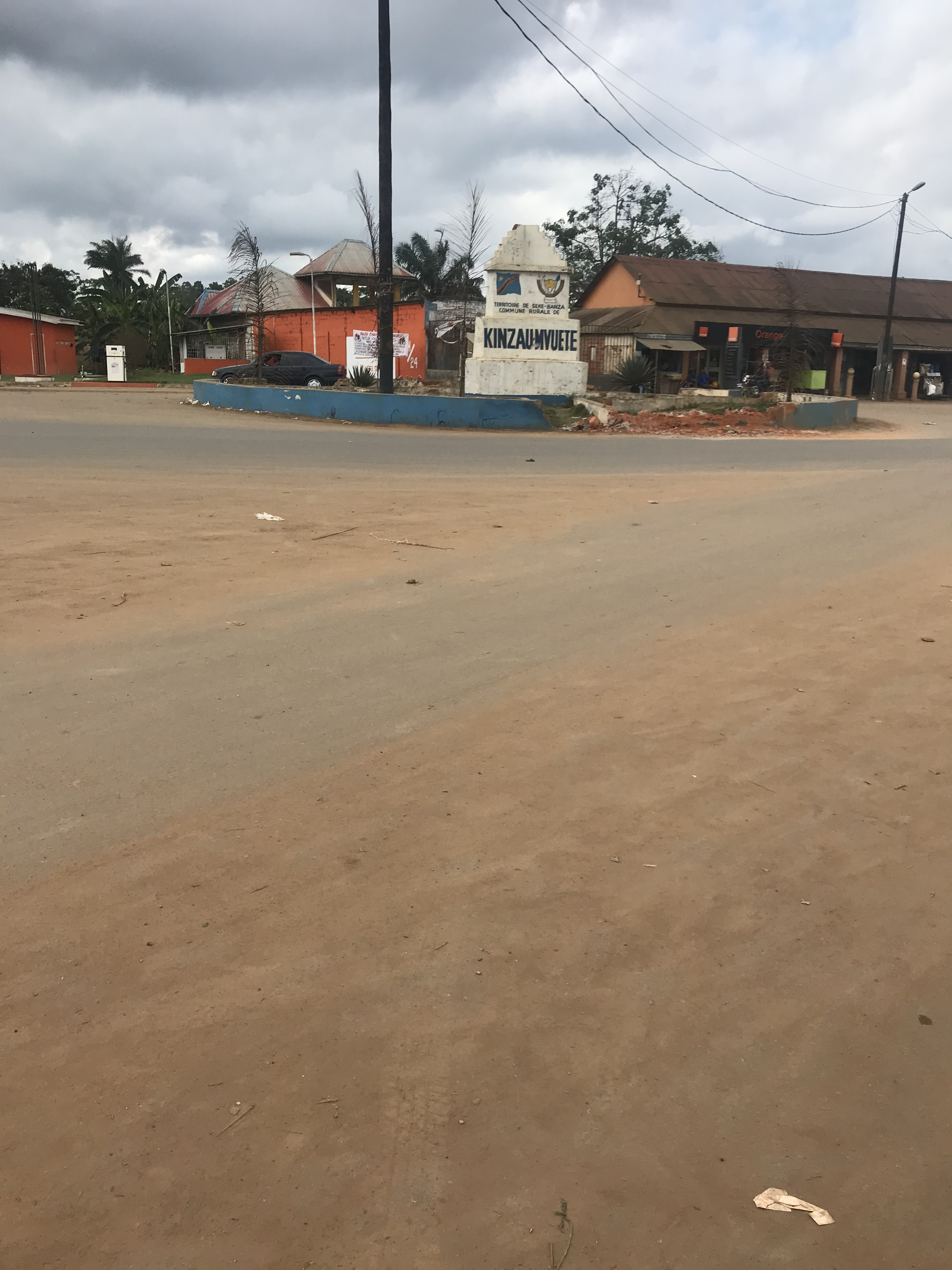
- Kinzau-Mvuete in 2021

- Location within Democratic Republic of the Congo
- Coordinates: 5.496686°S 13.289273°E
- Country: Democratic Republic of the Congo
- Province: Kongo Central
- Territory: Seke-Banza

Population (2012 estimate)
  - Total: 18,676

Kinzau-Mvuete (or Kinzao) is a town in the Kongo Central province of the Democratic Republic of the Congo, about 70 kilometres (43 mi) north of Matadi. It had an estimated population of 18,676 as of 2012.

The commune (municipality) of Kinzau-Mvuete is one of the eight administrative divisions of Seke-Banza Territory. It is at a crossroads, and is a center of trade for the territory with large urban centers such as Muanda, Boma, Matadi and Kinshasa. In June 2007 it was reported that the 22 kilometres (14 mi) road running north from Kinzao to Seke-Banza was in an advanced state of deterioration following torrential rains. The authorities were planning to raise money to fill the potholes through tolls.

The area around the town has been illegally deforested, with the wood used to make charcoal or as lumber for construction. In 2009 it was reported that poaching was widespread in the nearby Mayumbe forest, with villagers killing any animal they could catch and smoking the meat for sale. Some species such as wild boar and porcupine were at risk of being wiped out in the region.

The Higher Institute of Rural Development (ISDR) in Kinzau Mvuete was founded in 1993 and opened in February 1994. It provides training in practical agricultural techniques. As of February 2009 there were recurrent shortages of drinking water due to lack of supply pumps. Education on family planning is lacking, and sexual violence is common. According to the health center, 75 adolescent girls aged 13 to 17 became pregnant in 2009.
