= Kimvula =

- Location in Democratic Republic of the Congo
- Coordinates: 5.71707°S 15.96107°E
- Country: Democratic Republic of the Congo
- Province: Bas-Congo
- District: Lukaya District
- Territory: Kimvula Territory

Kimvula (or Kimbula) is a community in Lukaya District of Bas-Congo Province in the Democratic Republic of the Congo. It contains the headquarters of Kimvula Territory.
