= Mayumbe line =

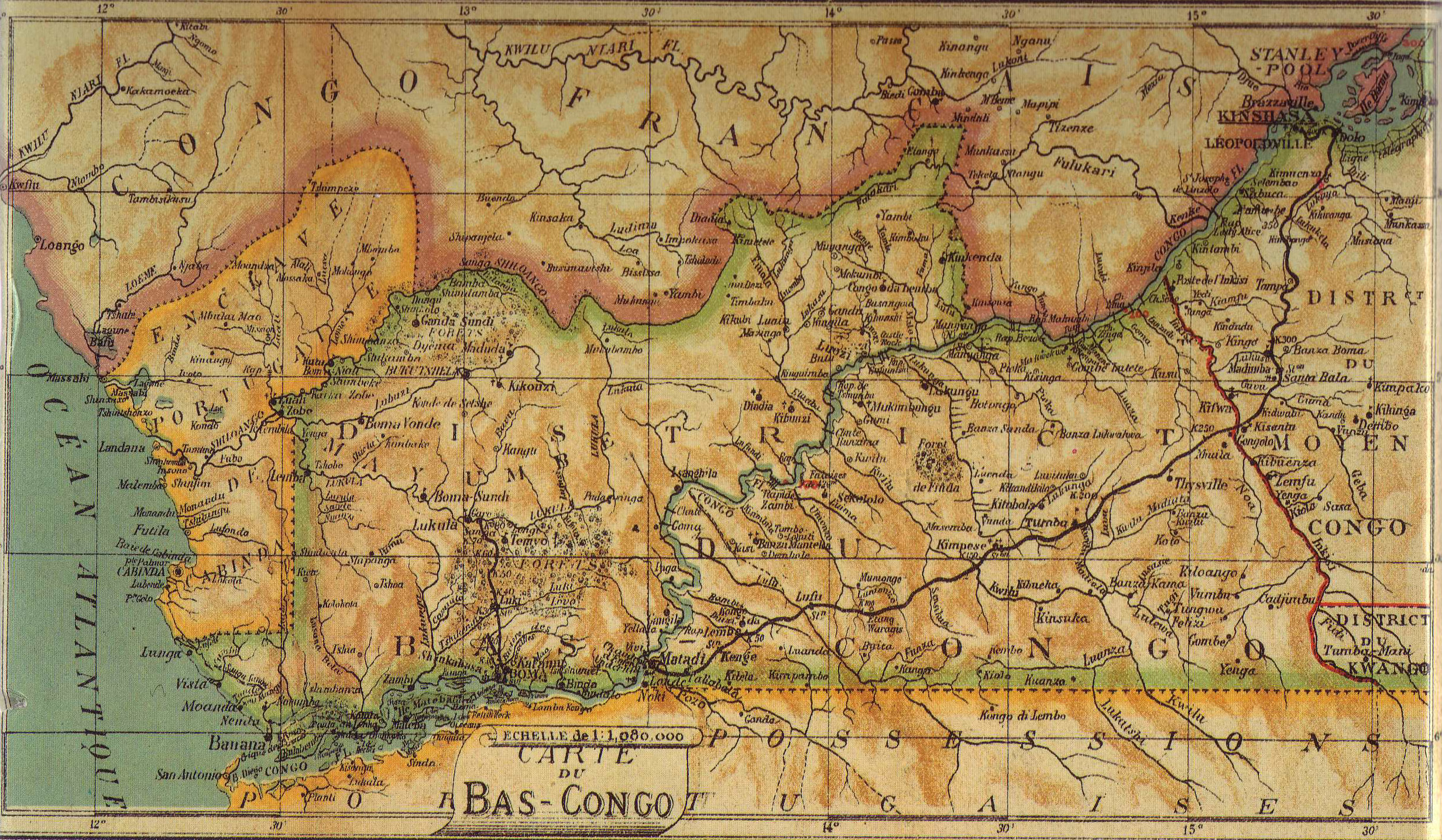
- The railway line in 1913

Overview
- Termini: Boma; Tshela

History
- Opened: 1898
- Closed: 1984

Technical
- Line length: 140 km (87 mi)
- Track gauge: 600 mm (1 ft 11 5/8 in)
- Old gauge: 610 mm (2 ft)

The Mayumbe line was a 140 km (87 mi) long 610 mm (2 ft) gauge narrow gauge railway in the north west of the Democratic Republic of the Congo between the port of Boma and Tshela.

== History ==
The Société des Chemins de fer vicinaux du Mayumbe (CVM) was created on July 30, 1898, to build and operate a network of railways built at a 2 ft (610 mm) narrow gauge in the province of Lower Congo, in the Congo Free State which became Belgian Congo then Republic of the Congo, with a planned extension to the Republic of Congo.

On 1 January 1936, the CVM was integrated with the Office des Transports Coloniaux (OTRACO).

In 1974, it was merged with the Office National des Transports (ONATRA). The line was dismantled in 1984 under Mobutu Sese Seko, along with the local industry.

== Line ==
Boma - Lukula - Tshela (140 km)

- Boma (Plateau) - Bangu (8 km), opening May 7, 1899
- Bangu - Kisundi (35 km), opening on January 1, 1900
- Kisundi - Lukula (35 km), opening December 31, 1901
- Lukula - Tshela (60 km), opening 31 December 1912, extension opened by the State

In 1932, the Boma Lukula section was converted to 600 mm (1 ft 11 5/8 in) narrow gauge, the section from Lukula to Tshela in 1938.

== Locomotives ==
- No. 1-8, type 020T, delivered in 1898-9 by Saint Léonard Liège
- No. 1A-4A, type Garratt 020-020, delivered in 1911 by Saint Léonard Liège
- No. 1B-2B, type Garratt 020-020, delivered in 1919 by Saint Leonard in Liege
- No. 3B-6B, type Garratt 020-020, delivered in 1921 by Saint Leonard in Liege
- No. 7B-11B, type Garratt 020-020, delivered in 1924 by Saint Leonard in Liege
- No. 1C-4C, type Garratt 020-020, delivered in 1926 by Saint Leonard in Liege
- No. 1E, type Garratt 020-020, delivered in 1927 by Saint Leonard in Liege

== Gallery ==
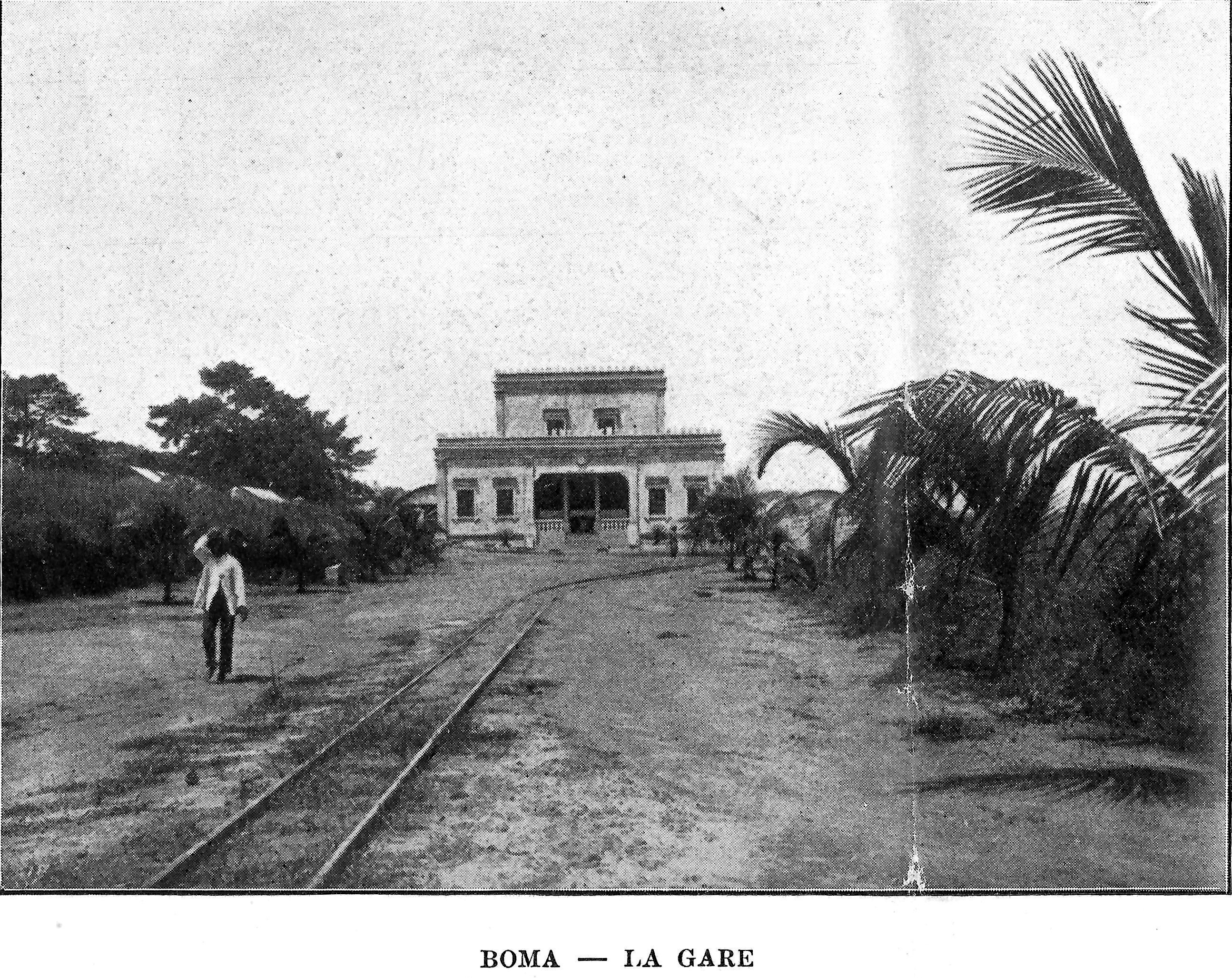
Historical view of Boma station

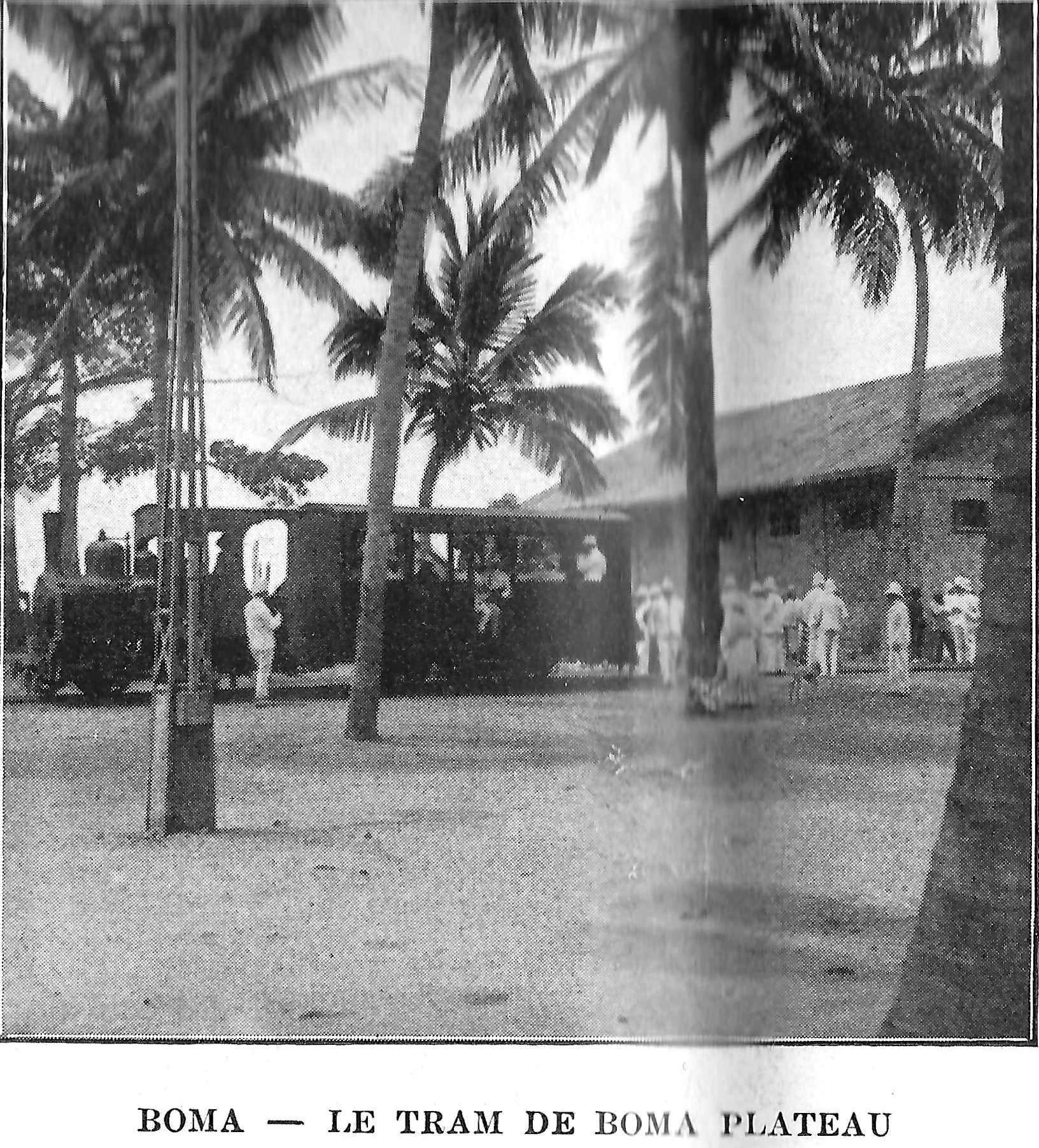
The local tram at Boma

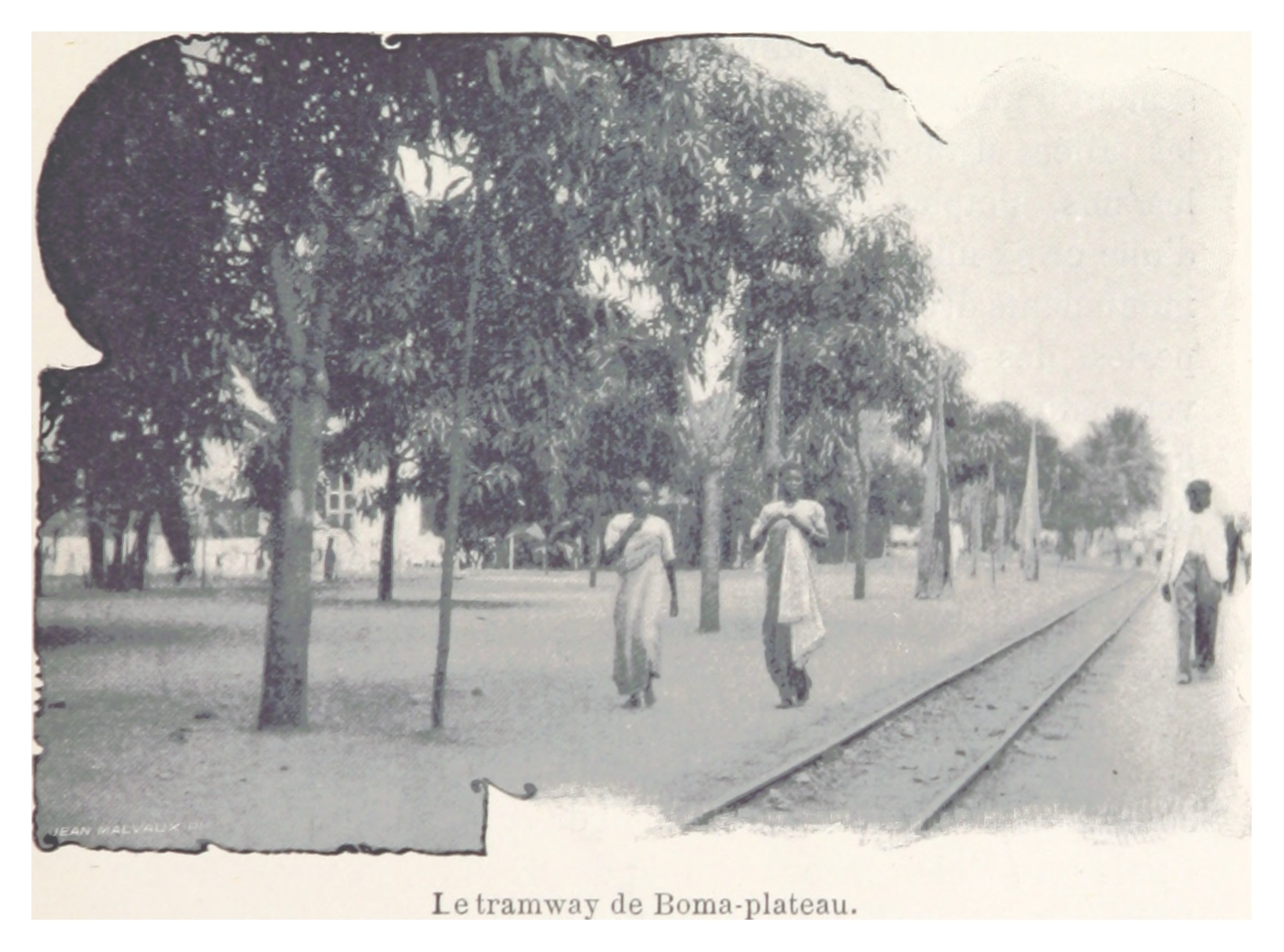
Another view of Boma

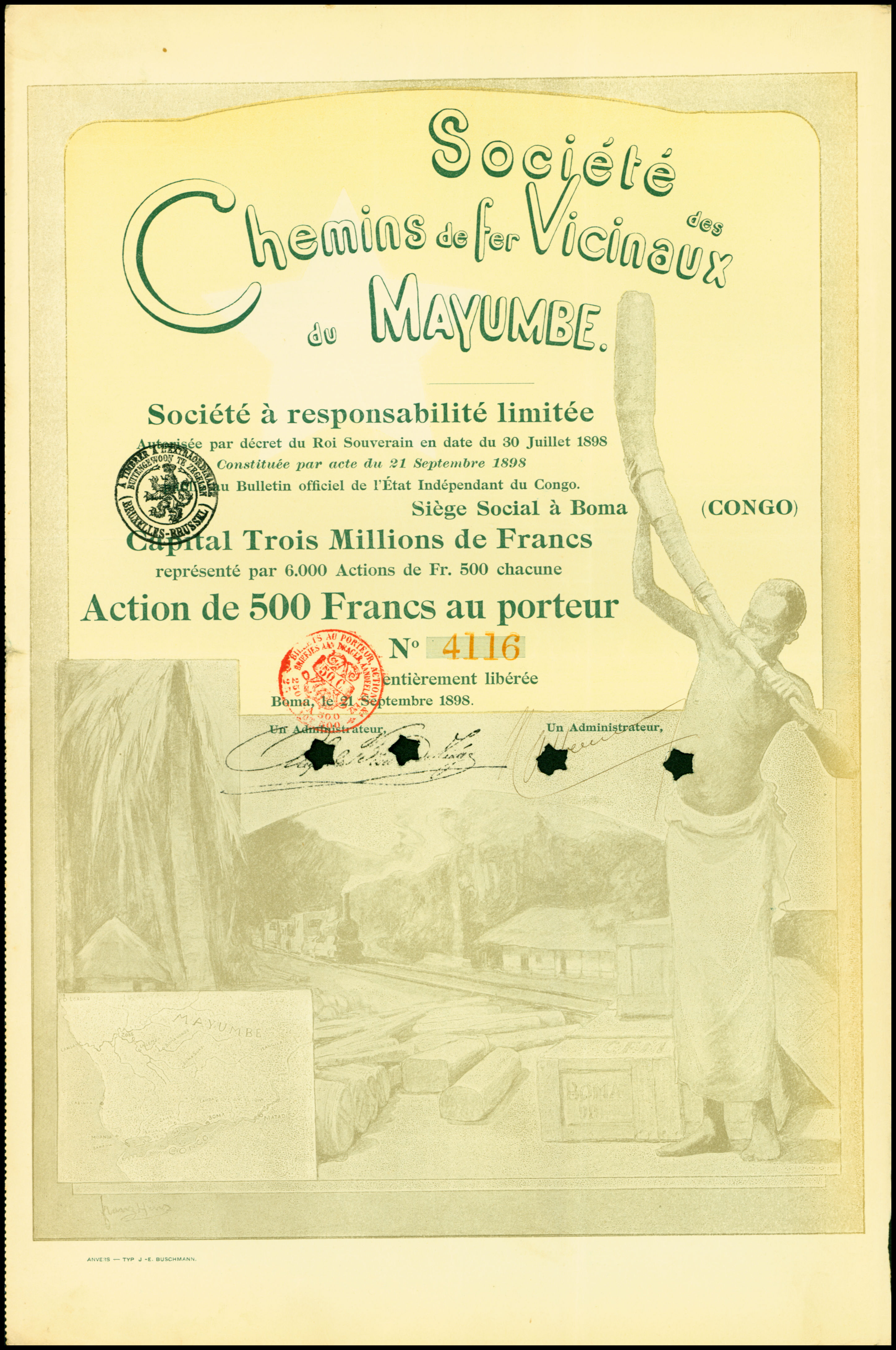
Share of the Société des Chemins de fer Vicinaux du Mayumbe, issued 21. September 1898
