= Seke-Banza Territory =

Seke-Banza
- Territory
- Interactive map of Seke-Banza
- Location within Democratic Republic of the Congo
- Coordinates: 5.337327°S 13.2776486°E
- Country: DR Congo
- Province: Kongo Central
- Seat: Seke-Banza

Area
  - Total: 3,620 km^{2} (1,400 sq mi)
- Time zone: UTC+1 (West Africa Time)

Seke-Banza Territory is an administrative area of the Kongo Central province of the Democratic Republic of the Congo, to the north of the city of Matadi. The administrative center is the town of Seke-Banza. The territory is divided into five sectors: Bundi, Isangila, Lufu, Mavu and Sumbi.

== Roads ==
The town of Kinzau-Mvuete is in the Bundi sector of Seke-Banza Territory. It is at a crossroads, and is a center of trade for the territory with large urban centers such as Muanda, Boma, Matadi and Kinshasa. In June 2007 it was reported that the 22 kilometres (14 mi) road running north from Kinzao to the town of Seke-Banza was in an advanced state of deterioration following torrential rains. The authorities were planning to raise money to fill the potholes through tolls. As of November 2008 the road had still not been repaired. As a result, trucks and motorcycles could no longer transport food from the town, and the prices paid for produce such as cassava, peanuts and tarot had dropped by as much as one half.

== Security problems ==
In January 2008 there were violent clashes in Seke-Banza Territory between police and members of the Bundu dia Kongo politico-religious movement in which a number of innocent people were killed or injured. In March 2007 Dr. Ngimbi Wasolwa of the General Hospital in Seke Banza said his facilities were overwhelmed by injured people, with no beds to receive further patients. The X-ray machine had not been working for a year, but due to the insecurity it was impossible to transfer patients by ambulance to Matadi.

On 31 December 2010 police arrested 24 people in Kivava village and four more in Isangila sector of Seke-Banza territory. They were said to be former members of the Zairian Armed Forces (FAZ) from different parts of the country, and had been terrorizing the villagers. In May 2011 there were violent clashes between villagers of Tshela Territory to the north and villagers of Seke-Banza Territory, competing for access to agricultural land.
