= Zamenga Batukezanga =

Congolese writer and philanthropist (1933–2000)

- Born: February 20, 1933; Bas-Congo, Democratic Republic of Congo (Zaire)
- Died: June 2, 2000 (aged 67); Kinshasa, Democratic Republic of Congo (Zaire)
- Education: Université libre de Bruxelles
- Occupations: Author, public speaker
- Writing career
- Genres: Fiction, essays, poetry
- Notable works: Mille kilomètres à pied (1979); Un boy à Pretoria (1989)

Zamenga Batukezanga (1933–2000) was a Congolese writer and philanthropist. Zamenga's work explored African culture. He's been named the "most popular Congolese writer" of the Democratic Republic of Congo.

== Career ==
Zamenga Batukezanga was born on February 20, 1933 (age 93) in nkobo- Luozi Bas-Congo, Democratic Republic of Congo. In the 1950s, he did his graduate studies at Mangembo and in 1960, a scholarship allowed him to study at l'Université libre de Bruxelles, in Belgium. Back in Congo in 1965, he was appointed Director of Student Social Work. In 1977, he opened a center for the rehabilitation of young people with physical disabilities (Kikesa), which he headed until 1981. In 1984, he was appointed director general of the National Society of Congolese publishers, composers and authors.

== Later life and legacy ==
Towards the end of the 1980s, Zamenga decided to leave everything. He refused a post at Unesco in 1986 to devote himself entirely to writing and philanthropic works. He spent the last years of his life in his native region, serving the poor. He died on June 2, 2000 (age 67) in Kinshasa

Every year, the Zamenga Batukezanga Literary Prize is awarded to a Congolese writer under the age of 40.

== Selected works ==
- Souvenir du village, 1971
- Bandoki, 1973
- Carte postale, 1974
- Village qui disparaît dans les promesses, 1975
- Les îles Soyo, éditions Zabat, 1979
- Lettre d’Amérique, 1980
- Un Croco à Luozi, 1980
- Psaumes sur le fleuve Zaïre, 1985
- Un Blanc en Afrique, 1988
- Pour une démystification: la littérature en Afrique, 1989
- Un boy à Pretoria, 1990
- Laveur des Cadavres, 1992
- Pour un cheveu blanc, posthumous work, 2005
- La Mercèdes qui saute le trou, posthumous work, 2005

== Award ==
- 1985: Grand Prize of the 20th anniversary of the 2nd Republic of Zaire for all of his literary work.

== Legagy ==
- Phambu Ngoma-Binda, Zamenga Batukezanga : Vie et Œuvre, Éditions Saint Paul Afrique, 1990, 80 p
- Wyatt Mc Gaffey, « Zamenga of Zaire: Novelist, Historian, Sociologist, Philosopher and Moralist », in Research in African Literatures, vol. 13, No. 2 (Summer, 1982), p. 208-215 Zamenga of Zaire: "Novelist, Historian, Sociologist, Philosopher and Moralist" on JSTOR
