= Moanda, Democratic Republic of the Congo =

Town of Kongo Central, DR Congo

Moanda
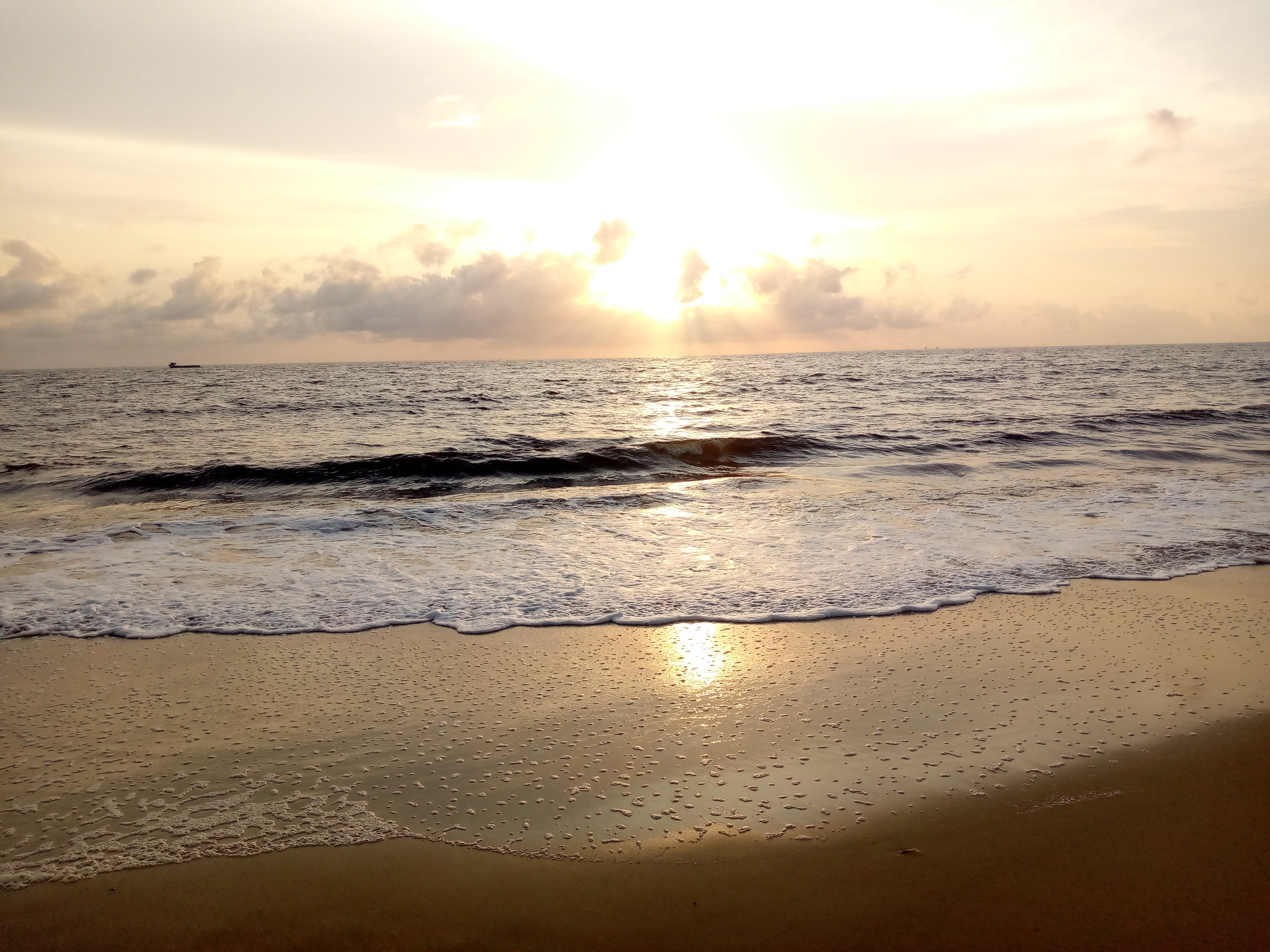

- Location in the Democratic Republic of the Congo
- Coordinates: 5°56′3″S 12°20′58″E
- Country: DR Congo
- Province: Kongo Central

Moanda or Muanda is a town and territory lying on the Atlantic Ocean coast of the Democratic Republic of the Congo at the mouth of the Congo River. It is situated in Kongo Central Province, and has a population of 90,812 as of 2012. The town has an airport and is known for its beaches, and has a few limited tourist facilities, but tourism is incidental to the main economic activities of the town.

The town of Muanda is 8 kilometres (5.0 mi) north-west of the small port of Banana in the mouth of the Congo, and 6.5 kilometres (4.0 mi) southeast of Point Kipundji. The Moanda Oil Terminal, consisting of various platforms, pipelines and a permanent tanker, lies 10 miles southwest of Point Kipundji. Some 100 km upstream from Muanda, on the north bank of the Congo River, lies the city of Boma, DR Congo's second-largest port. The great width and depth of the Congo River allow seagoing vessels to reach Boma and the largest port, Matadi, despite their distance from the coast.

== Climate ==
The Köppen-Geiger climate classification system classifies Moanda‘s climate as tropical wet and dry (Aw), although it is only marginally wet enough to avoid being classed as a hot semi-arid climate (BSh).

Climate data for Moanda (altitude: 31 metres or 102 feet)
Month	Jan	Feb	Mar	Apr	May	Jun	Jul	Aug	Sep	Oct	Nov	Dec	Year
Mean daily maximum °C (°F)	31.3 (88.3)	31.3 (88.3)	32.1 (89.8)	31.9 (89.4)	30.8 (87.4)	28.1 (82.6)	26.3 (79.3)	26.3 (79.3)	28.1 (82.6)	30.2 (86.4)	30.3 (86.5)	31.1 (88.0)	29.8 (85.7)
Daily mean °C (°F)	26.8 (80.2)	26.8 (80.2)	27.4 (81.3)	27.2 (81.0)	26.3 (79.3)	23.4 (74.1)	21.7 (71.1)	21.8 (71.2)	23.8 (74.8)	26.2 (79.2)	26.3 (79.3)	26.8 (80.2)	25.4 (77.7)
Mean daily minimum °C (°F)	22.4 (72.3)	22.4 (72.3)	22.7 (72.9)	22.6 (72.7)	21.8 (71.2)	18.7 (65.7)	17.2 (63.0)	17.4 (63.3)	19.5 (67.1)	22.2 (72.0)	22.4 (72.3)	22.5 (72.5)	21.0 (69.8)
Average rainfall mm (inches)	81 (3.2)	132 (5.2)	145 (5.7)	166 (6.5)	59 (2.3)	0 (0)	0 (0)	1 (0.0)	6 (0.2)	29 (1.1)	127 (5.0)	87 (3.4)	833 (32.6)
Source: Climate-Data.org

Climate data for Moanda (altitude: 32 metres or 105 feet)
Month	Jan	Feb	Mar	Apr	May	Jun	Jul	Aug	Sep	Oct	Nov	Dec	Year
Mean daily maximum °C (°F)	31.4 (88.5)	31.5 (88.7)	32.2 (90.0)	32.1 (89.8)	31 (88)	28.2 (82.8)	26.5 (79.7)	26.4 (79.5)	28.4 (83.1)	30.4 (86.7)	30.4 (86.7)	31.4 (88.5)	30.0 (86.0)
Daily mean °C (°F)	26.8 (80.2)	26.9 (80.4)	27.3 (81.1)	27.3 (81.1)	26.3 (79.3)	23.4 (74.1)	21.8 (71.2)	21.8 (71.2)	23.9 (75.0)	26.3 (79.3)	26.3 (79.3)	26.9 (80.4)	25.4 (77.7)
Mean daily minimum °C (°F)	22.3 (72.1)	22.4 (72.3)	22.5 (72.5)	22.6 (72.7)	21.7 (71.1)	18.8 (65.8)	17.2 (63.0)	17.3 (63.1)	19.4 (66.9)	22.2 (72.0)	22.3 (72.1)	22.4 (72.3)	20.9 (69.7)
Average rainfall mm (inches)	77 (3.0)	129 (5.1)	139 (5.5)	168 (6.6)	60 (2.4)	0 (0)	0 (0)	1 (0.0)	6 (0.2)	28 (1.1)	125 (4.9)	87 (3.4)	820 (32.2)
Source: Climate-Data.org

== See also ==
- Mangroves National Park
