= Seke-Banza =

- Commune
- Location within Democratic Republic of the Congo
- Coordinates: 5.337327°S 13.2776486°E
- Country: Democratic Republic of the Congo
- Province: Kongo Central
- Territory: Seke-Banza

Population (2012 estimate)
  - Total: 6,286

Seke-Banza is a community in Kongo Central province of the Democratic Republic of the Congo. It is the seat of the Seke-Banza territory. As of 2012 the town's population was estimated to be 6,286.

In June 2007 it was reported that the 22 kilometres (14 mi) road running north from Kinzao to Seke-Banza was in an advanced state of deterioration following torrential rains. The authorities were planning to raise money to fill the potholes through tolls. As of November 2008 the road had still not been repaired. As a result, trucks and motorcycles could no longer transport food from the town, and the prices paid for produce such as cassava, peanuts and tarot had dropped by as much as one half.
