= Lukula =

Town in the Democratic Republic of the Congo

- Town
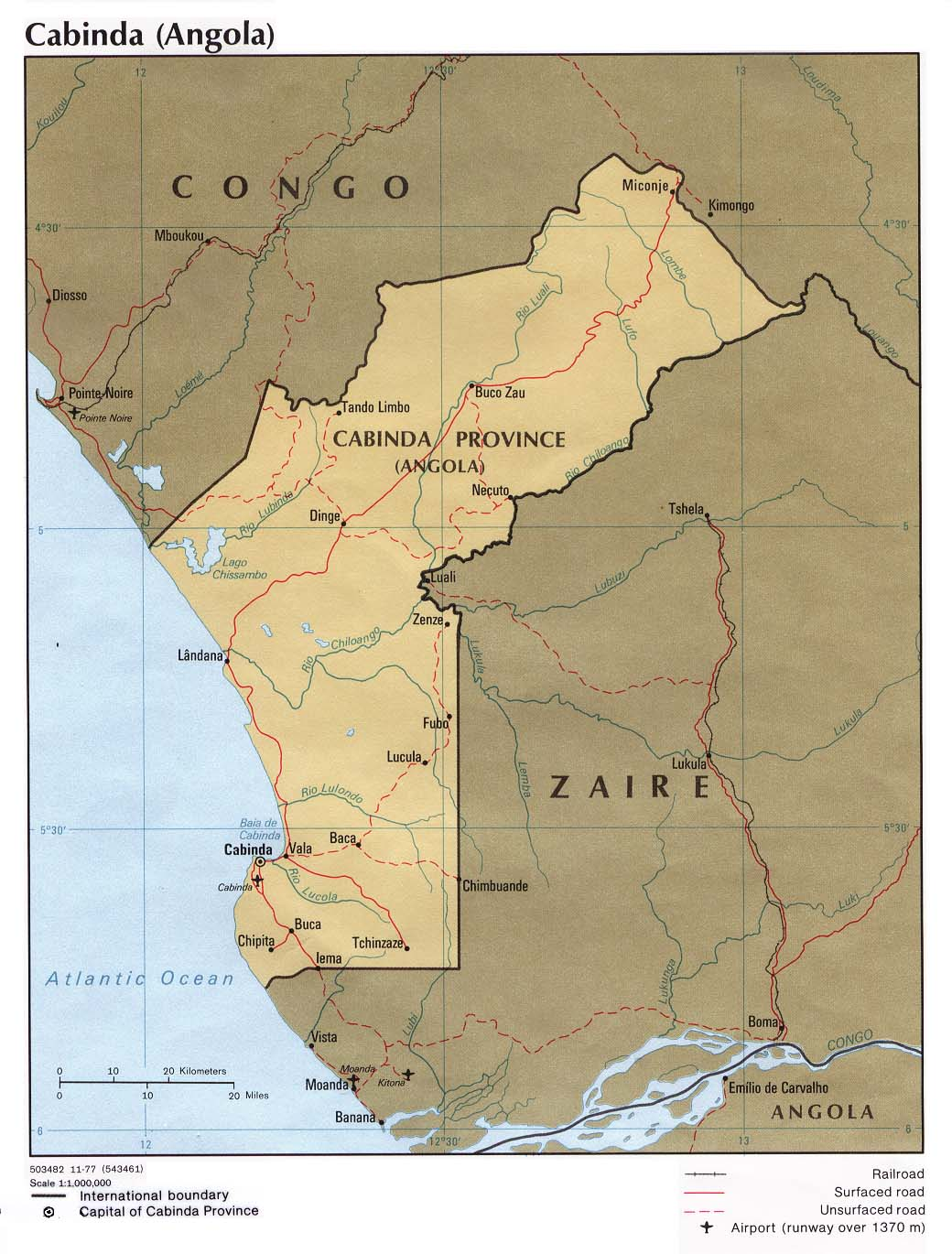
- Lukula and surrounding area.

- Location within Democratic Republic of the Congo
- Coordinates: 05°24′00″S 12°56′00″E
- Country: DR Congo
- Province: Kongo Central

Area
  - Total: 10 km^{2} (3.9 sq mi)
- Elevation: 144 m (472 ft)

Population (2004)
  - Total: 26,878
  - Density: 2,700/km^{2} (7,000/sq mi)
- Time zone: UTC+1 (WAT)

Lukula is a town in, and a territory of Kongo Central province, Democratic Republic of the Congo. It lies on the road and disused Mayumbe railway line between Boma, to the south, and Tshela, to the north, on the southern bank of the Lakula river. Lukula lies at an altitude of 144 m (472 ft) above sea level. Economic activity includes cement production, utilising locally occurring limestone, and commercial Logging. As of the year 2004, there were 26,878 residents within Lukula.

== See also ==
- Railway stations in Congo
