= Madimba =

Coordinates: 04°58′35″S 15°07′58″E

Madimba is a town in Kongo Central Province in the Democratic Republic of the Congo lying between the capital and the coast.

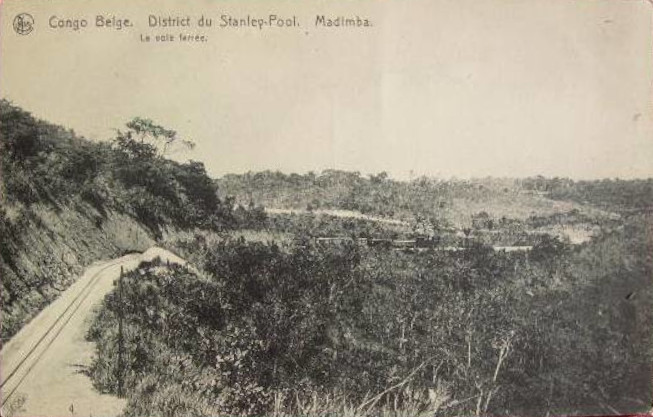
Railway near Madimba

== See also ==
Railway stations in DRCongo
