= Provincial Assembly of Kongo Central =

The Provincial Assembly of Kongo Central is the provincial legislature of Kongo Central, Democratic Republic of the Congo.
