= Kimvula Territory =

Kimvula
- Territory
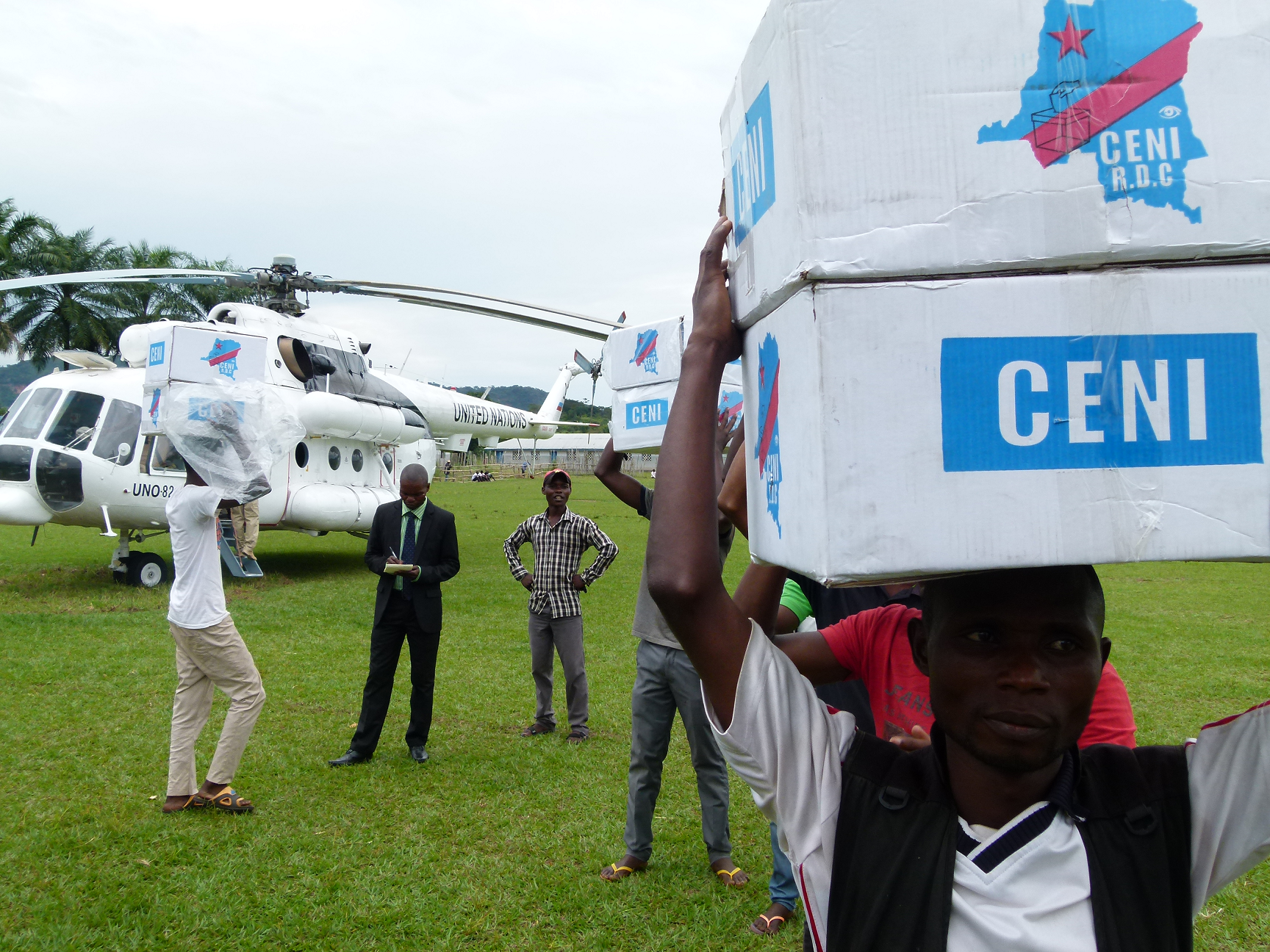
- Equipment and material delivery for National Electoral Commission (CENI) antenna in Kimvula, Kongo
- Interactive map of Kimvula
- Location within Democratic Republic of the Congo
- Coordinates: 5.430°S 16.011°E
- Country: DR Congo
- Province: Kongo Central
- Time zone: UTC+1 (WAT)

Kimvula is a territory in the Kongo Central province of the Democratic Republic of the Congo. Its seat is the town of Kimvula.
