= Lukaya District =

Lukaya District is a district located in the Kongo Central province, in the Democratic Republic of the Congo.
