= Kongo Central =

Province of the Democratic Republic of the Congo

Kongo Central Province du Kongo Central (French) Kizunga kia Kongo dia Kati (Kikongo)
- Province
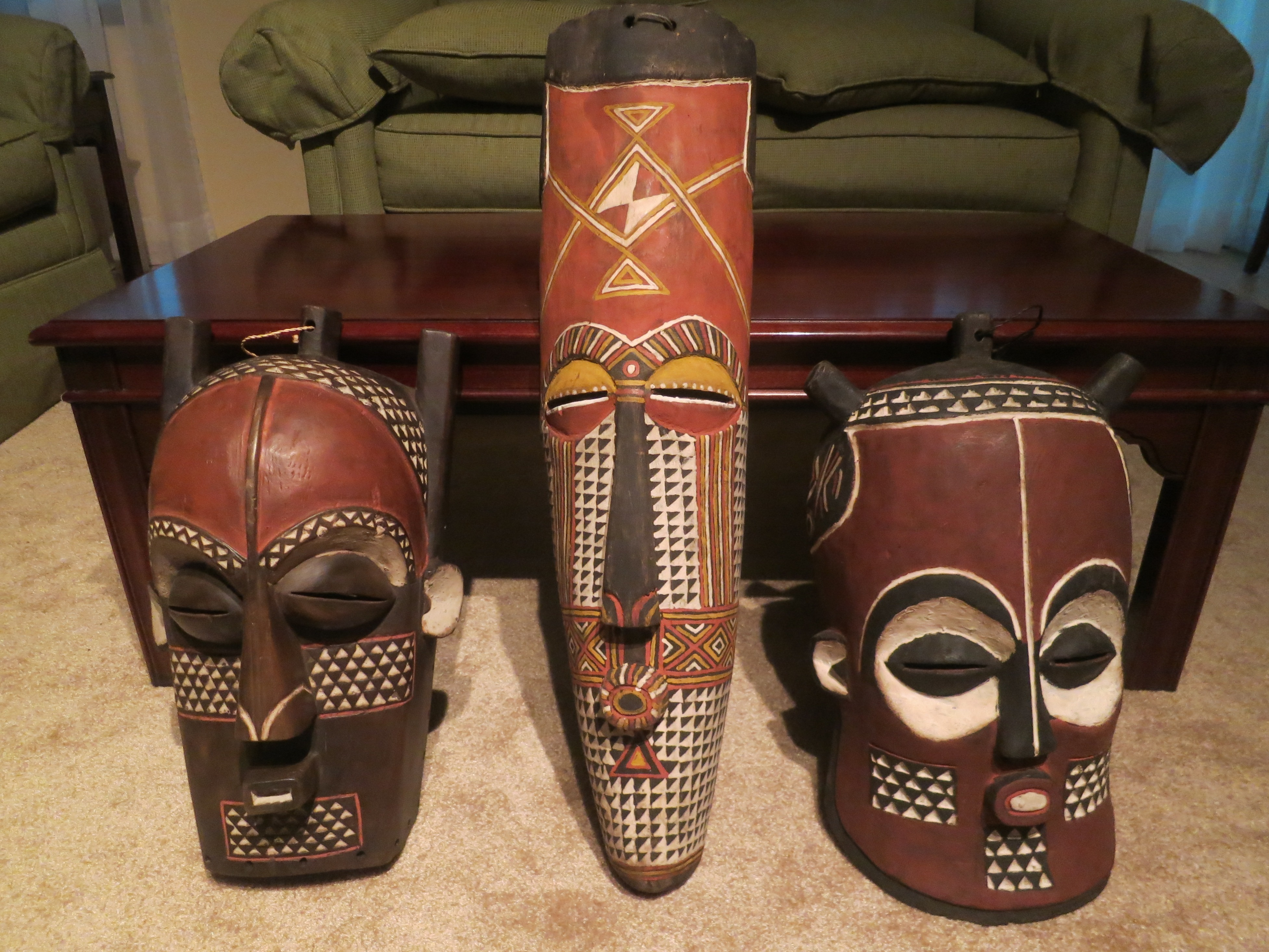
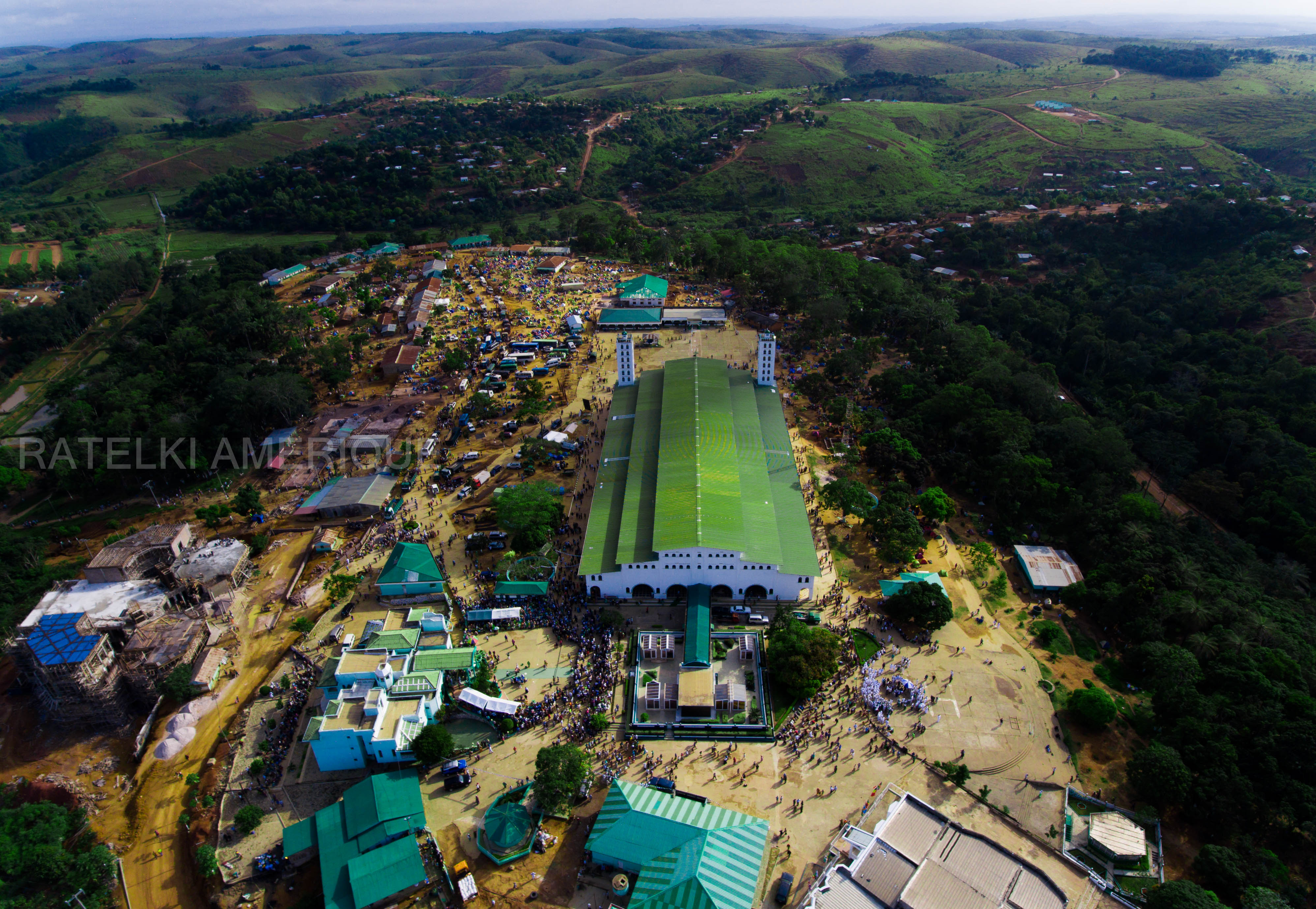
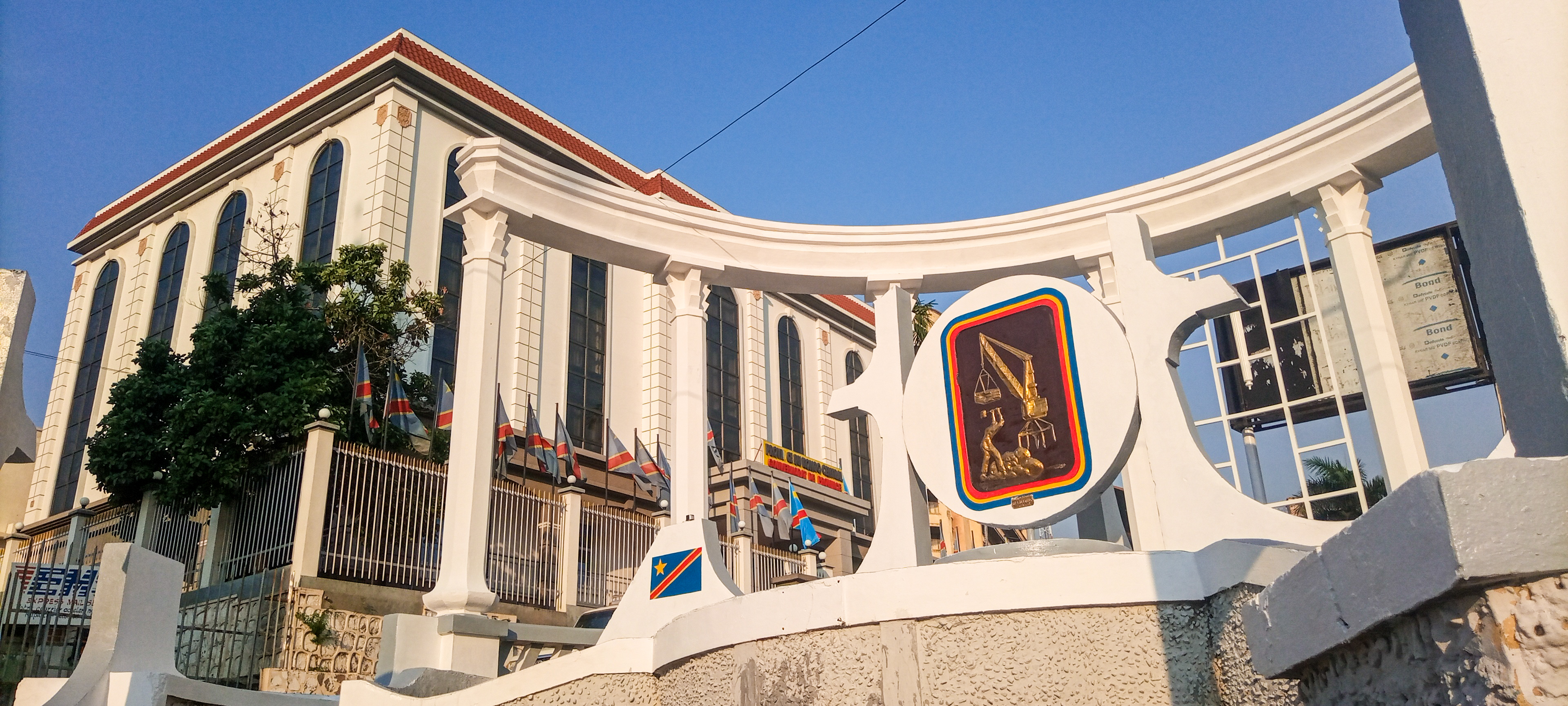
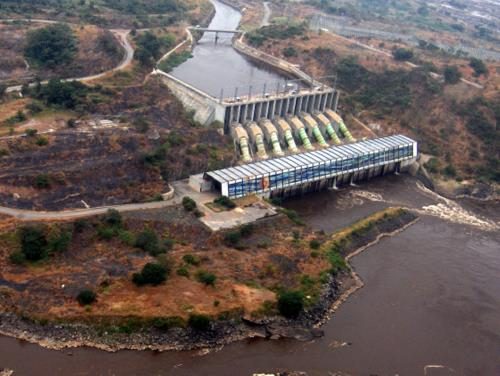
- Top-left: Bakongo masks, Top-right: Kimbanguist Temple in Nkamba, Bottom-left: Governor Building in Matadi, Bottom-right: Inga 2 Dam

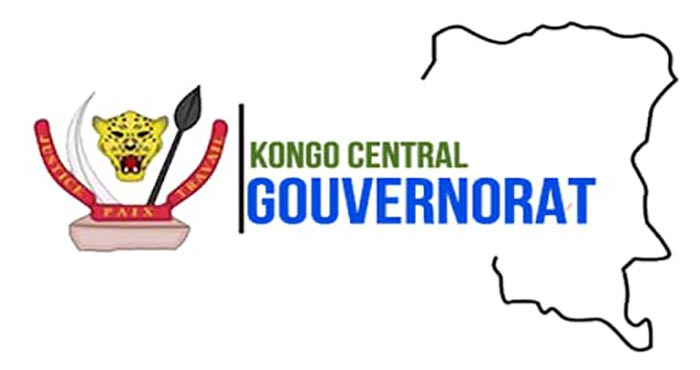
- Flag Seal

- Coordinates: 05°49′S 13°29′E
- Country: DR Congo
- Capital and largest city: Matadi

Government
  - Body: Provincial Assembly of Kongo Central
  - Governor: Grâce Bilolo

Area
  - Total: 53,920 km^{2} (20,820 sq mi)

Population (2024)
  - Total: 6,923,500
  - Density: 128.4/km^{2} (332.6/sq mi)

Ethnic groups
  - Native: BaKongo
- Time zone: UTC+1 (West Africa Time)
- ISO 3166 code: CD-BC
- License Plate Code: (Democratic Republic of the Congo) CGO / 10
- Official language: French
- National languages: Kikongo ya Leta, lingala
- HDI (2023): 0.521low
- Non-national language: Kikongo

Kongo Central (Kongo: Kongo dia Kati), formerly Bas-Congo, is one of the 26 provinces of the Democratic Republic of the Congo. Its capital is Matadi.

== History ==
At the time of independence, the area now encompassing Kongo Central was part of the greater province of Léopoldville, along with the capital city of Kinshasa and the districts of Kwango, Kwilu and Mai-Ndombe. Under Belgian colonial rule, the territory of the current province was a district known as Bas-Congo (as in "Lower Congo River") and was renamed Kongo Central after independence.

Under the regime of Mobutu Sese Seko from 1965 to 1997, the Congo river was renamed as Zaire. The province was named as Bas-Zaïre. The name was later reverted to Bas-Congo. It was subsequently renamed as Kongo Central in 2015.

== Geography ==
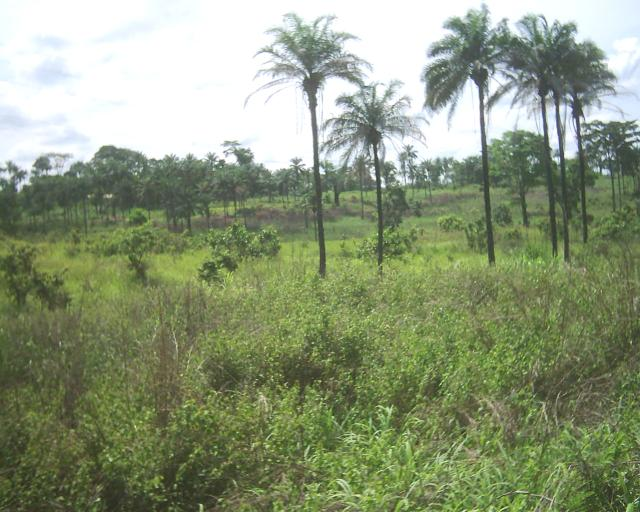
Landscape of Kongo Central

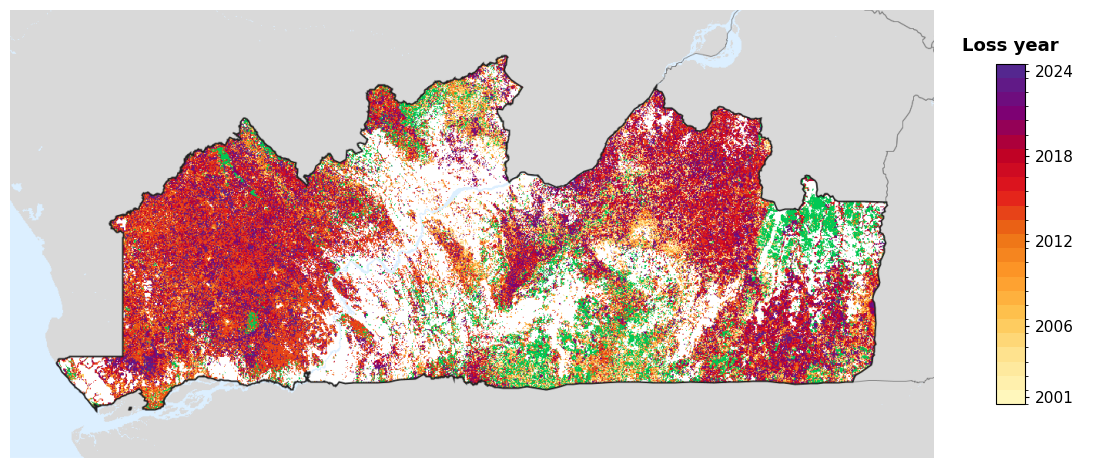
Tree-cover loss year in Kongo Central, 2001-2024, from the Global Forest Change dataset.

Kongo Central is the only province in the country with an ocean coastline; it has narrow frontage on the Atlantic Ocean to the west. It borders the city-province of Kinshasa to the north-east, the province of Kwango to the east, and the Republic of Angola to the south as well as the Republic of the Congo and Cabinda to the north. The entire province has a tropical savanna climate by the Köppen-Geiger climate classification.

The lower Congo River traverses the province from the north-east to the south-west. It is navigable from the Atlantic Ocean to the port city of Matadi after which there are a series of rapids that make it unnavigable until the Malebo Pool.

== Administration ==
The provincial capital is Matadi, with Boma being the other official city. The remainder of the province is administratively divided into ten territories, the most of any province:

Administrative division	Type	Map
Boma	City	Boma
Matadi	City	Matadi
Kasangulu	Territory	Kasangalu
Kimvula	Territory	Kimvula
Lukula	Territory	Lukula
Luozi	Territory	Luozi
Madimba	Territory	Madimba
Mbanza-Ngungu	Territory	Mbanza-Ngungu
Moanda	Territory	Moanda
Seke-Banza	Territory	Sekebanza
Songololo	Territory	Songololo
Tshela	Territory	Tshela

Before 2015 these territories were divisions of the Bas-Fleuve, Cataractes and Lukaya districts; except for Moanda, which was attached to Boma (a city/district hybrid).

== Demographics ==
Name	Former District	Territory	Pop. 2010	Coordinates
Boma	–	–	167,326	5°51′S 13°03′E
Inga	Bas-Fleuve	Tshela	10,417	5°39′S 13°39′E
Inkisi	Lukaya	Kasangulu	77,797	5°08′S 15°04′E
Kasangulu	Lukaya	Kasangulu	30,724	4°35′S 15°11′E
Kimpese	Cataractes	Songololo	53,660	5°33′S 14°26′E
Kimvula	Lukaya	Kimvula		5°43′03″S 15°57′44″E
Kinzau-Mvuete	Bas-Fleuve	Tshela	17,870	5°29′S 13°17′E
Lukula	Bas-Fleuve	Lukula	31,394	5°23′S 12°57′E
Luozi	Cataractes	Luozi	13,258	4°57′S 14°08′E
Madimba	Lukaya	Madimba		4°58′48″S 15°08′46″E
Matadi	–	–	291,338	5°49′S 13°29′E
Mbanza-Ngungu	Cataractes	Mbanza-Ngungu	97,037	5°15′S 14°52′E
Muanda	Boma	Muanda	86,896	5°56′S 12°21′E
Seke-Banza	Bas-Fleuve	Seke-Banza	6,015	5°20′S 13°16′E
Songololo	Cataractes	Songololo	12,382	5°42′S 14°02′E
Tshela	Bas-Fleuve	Tshela	45,588	4°58′0″S 12°56′0″E

== Notable people from Kongo Central ==
- Afonso I of Kongo, the sixth ruler of the Kingdom of Kongo.
- Kudianga Bayokisa, teacher and politician
- Zamenga Batukezanga, writer, was born in Kongo Central.
- Paul Panda Farnana, first Congolese with Belgian diploma of higher education.
- Thomas Kanza, Congolese diplomat. He was one of the first Congolese nationals to graduate from a university.
- Sophie Kanza, first Congolese woman to obtain a university degree; politician and sociologist.
- Joseph Kasa-Vubu, Democratic Republic of the Congo first president.
- Simon Kimbangu, founder of Christian new religious movement Kimbanguism.
- Ray Lema, France-based pianist, guitarist, and songwriter.
- François Luambo Luanzo Makiadi, virtuoso Congolese Rumba guitarist and singer.
- Ne Muanda Nsemi, Bundu dia Kongo leader.

== General and cited references ==
- Gillet, J. (1927). Catalogue des plantes du jardin d'essais de la mission de Kisantu. Brussels. 166 pp.
- Kibungu Kembelo, A. O. (2004). Plantes medicinales du Bas-Congo et leurs usages. DFID. 197 pp.
- Latham, P. (2003) Edible Caterpillars and Their Food Plants in Bas-Congo. Mystole Publications. ISBN 0954301277, 60 pp.
- Latham, P. (2004). Useful Plants of Bas-Congo Province. DFID. ISBN 0954669835, 320 pp.
- Latham, P. (2008). Les chenilles comestibles et leurs plantes nourricières dans la province du Bas-Congo DFID. ISBN 9780955420863, 44 pp.
- Latham, P. et Konda ku Mbuta, A. (2010). Plantes utiles du Bas-Congo. Mystole Publications. ISBN 9780955420818, 372 pp.
- Latham, P. et Konda ku Mbuta, A. (2011). Some Honeybee Plants of Bas-Congo Province. DFID. ISBN 9780955420894, 248 pp.
- Latham, P. & Konda ku Mbuta, A. (2014). Useful plants of Bas-Congo province. ISBN 9780955420870, 553 pp.
- Pauwels, L. (1993). Nzayilu N'ti – guide des arbres et arbustes de la région de Kinshasa – Brazzaville. Meise. ISBN 9072619102, 495 pp.
