= Tshela =

- Location in the Democratic Republic of the Congo
- Coordinates: 4°58′S 12°56′E
- Country: Democratic Republic of the Congo
- Province: Kongo Central
- Territory: Tshela
- Time zone: UTC+1

Tshela (or Tsela) is the main town of Bas-fleuve district in Kongo Central Province in the Democratic Republic of Congo. The town was linked to the port of Boma by an isolated narrow gauge railway, the Mayumbe Line, from 1889 to 1984.
