= September 2 =

September 2 this year in various calendars
- Wednesday, 2 September 2026
Akan	Fowukuo
Armenian	14 Hoṙi 1476
Aztec	Atemoztli 15, 2 Calli
Babylonian	19 Abu, 2337 SE
Balinese pawukon	Menga, Pasah, Sri, Paing, Tungleh, Buda of Uye, Ludra, Nohan, Manusa
Bengali	18 Bhadro, BS 1433
Chinese	Yin Earth Rabbit・Wall Mansion; Fire Horse Year, Month 7, Day 21 (Chushu, 5 days until Bailu)
Common Era	2 September 2026 CE
Coptic	27 Mesori, AM 1742
Egyptian	19 Tybi, 2775 NE
Ethiopian	27 Naḥasē, 2018 Amätä Məhrät
French Republican	Décade II, Sextidi de Fructidor de l'Année 234 de la République
Gregorian	2 September, AD 2026
Hebrew	20 Elul, AM 5786
Hindu	Bharaṇī・Vṛddhi; Solar: 17 Bhādrapada, 1948 SE; Lunisolar: Ṣaṣṭhī, Kṛishna pakṣa of Śrāvaṇa, 2083 VE; Rāudra・5127 KY・1,872,820
Icelandic	Miðvikudagur, 9 Tvímánuður 2026
Islamic	19 Rabi' al-awwal, AH 1448 (using tabular method)
ISO week date	2026-W36-3
Japanese	21 Fumizuki, Reiwa 8 (Shosho, 5 days until Hakuro)
Julian	20 August, AD 2026 (AM 7534)
Julian day	2461286
Korean	21 Wonsungidal, 4359 DE
Maya	13.0.13.16.3; 16 Mol, 2 Akbal
Roman	ante diem XIII Kalendas Septembres, MMDCCLXXIX AUC
Solar Hijri	11 Shahrivar, SH 1405
Tibetan	21 gro bzhin, me pho rta 2153 or 1772 or 1000

<<	September					>>
Su	Mo	Tu	We	Th	Fr	Sa
		1	2	3	4	5
6	7	8	9	10	11	12
13	14	15	16	17	18	19
20	21	22	23	24	25	26
27	28	29	30
2026

September 2 in recent years
2026 (Wednesday)
2025 (Tuesday)
2024 (Monday)
2023 (Saturday)
2022 (Friday)
2021 (Thursday)
2020 (Wednesday)
2019 (Monday)
2018 (Sunday)
2017 (Saturday)

September 2 is the 245th day of the year (246th in leap years) in the Gregorian calendar; 120 days remain until the end of the year.

== Events ==
=== Pre-1600 ===
- 44 BC – Pharaoh Cleopatra VII of Egypt declares her son co-ruler as Ptolemy XV Caesarion.
- 44 BC – Cicero launches the first of his Philippicae (oratorical attacks) on Mark Antony. He will make 14 of them over the following months.
- 31 BC – Final War of the Roman Republic: Battle of Actium: Off the western coast of Greece, forces of Octavian defeat troops under Mark Antony and Cleopatra.
- 911 – The Byzantine Empire and the Kievan Rus sign a treaty regulating trade.
- 1192 – The Treaty of Jaffa is signed between Richard I of England and Saladin, leading to the end of the Third Crusade.
- 1561 – Entry of Mary, Queen of Scots into Edinburgh, a spectacular civic celebration for the Queen of Scotland, marred by religious controversy.
- 1595 – An imperial army retakes the city of Esztergom from the Ottoman Empire.

=== 1601–1900 ===
- 1601 – 4th Spanish Armada makes landfall in Ireland at Kinsale.
- 1649 – The Italian city of Castro is completely destroyed by the forces of Pope Innocent X, ending the Wars of Castro.
- 1666 – The Great Fire of London breaks out and burns for three days, destroying 10,000 buildings, including Old St Paul's Cathedral.
- 1752 – Great Britain, along with its overseas possessions, adopts the Gregorian calendar.
- 1789 – The United States Department of the Treasury is founded.
- 1792 – During what became known as the September Massacres of the French Revolution, rampaging mobs slaughter three Roman Catholic bishops, more than two hundred priests, and prisoners believed to be royalist sympathizers.
- 1806 – A massive landslide destroys the town of Goldau, Switzerland, killing 457.
- 1807 – Napoleonic Wars: The British Royal Navy bombards Copenhagen with fire bombs and phosphorus rockets to prevent Denmark from surrendering its fleet to Napoleon.
- 1856 – The Tianjing incident takes place in Nanjing, China.
- 1859 – The Carrington Event is the strongest geomagnetic storm on record.
- 1862 – American Civil War: United States President Abraham Lincoln reluctantly restores Union General George B. McClellan to full command after General John Pope's disastrous defeat at the Second Battle of Bull Run.
- 1864 – American Civil War: Union forces enter Atlanta as the city surrenders, ending the Atlanta campaign as a victory for General William T. Sherman.
- 1867 – Mutsuhito, Emperor Meiji of Japan, marries Masako Ichijō, thereafter known as Empress Shōken.
- 1870 – Franco-Prussian War: Battle of Sedan: Prussian forces take Napoleon III of France and 100,000 of his soldiers prisoner.
- 1885 – Rock Springs massacre: In Rock Springs, Wyoming, 150 white miners, who are struggling to unionize so they could strike for better wages and work conditions, attack their Chinese fellow workers, killing 28, wounding 15 and forcing several hundred more out of town.
- 1898 – Battle of Omdurman: British and Egyptian troops defeat Sudanese tribesmen and establish British dominance in Sudan.

=== 1901–present ===
- 1901 – Vice President of the United States Theodore Roosevelt utters the famous phrase, "Speak softly and carry a big stick" at the Minnesota State Fair.
- 1912 – Arthur Rose Eldred is awarded the first Eagle Scout award of the Boy Scouts of America.
- 1923 – Kantō Massacre: Amid rumors that Koreans had been conducting acts of sabotage in the aftermath of the 1923 Great Kantō earthquake, lynch mobs of Japanese begin massacring thousands of civilians over the course of several weeks, mainly ethnic minorities such as Koreans and Chinese.
- 1935 – The Labor Day Hurricane, the most intense hurricane to strike the United States, makes landfall at Long Key, Florida, killing at least 400.
- 1939 – World War II: Following the start of the invasion of Poland the previous day, the Free City of Danzig (now Gdańsk, Poland) is annexed by Nazi Germany.
- 1944 – The last execution of a Finn in Finland takes place when soldier Olavi Laiho is executed by shooting in Oulu.
- 1945 – World War II: The Japanese Instrument of Surrender is signed by Japan and the major warring powers aboard the battleship USS Missouri in Tokyo Bay, thus marking the official end to the war.
- 1945 – Communist leader Ho Chi Minh proclaims the Democratic Republic of Vietnam after the end of the Nguyễn dynasty.
- 1946 – The Interim Government of India is formed, headed by Jawaharlal Nehru as vice president with the powers of a Prime Minister.
- 1957 – President Ngô Đình Diệm of South Vietnam becomes the first foreign head of state to make a state visit to Australia.
- 1958 – A USAF RC-130 is shot down by fighters over Armenia when it strays into Soviet airspace while conducting a sigint mission. All crew members are killed.
- 1960 – The first election of the Tibetan Parliament-in-Exile. The Tibetan community observes this date as Democracy Day.
- 1963 – CBS Evening News becomes U.S. network television's first half-hour weeknight news broadcast, when the show is lengthened from 15 to 30 minutes.
- 1968 – Operation OAU begins during the Nigerian Civil War.
- 1970 – NASA announces the cancellation of two Apollo missions to the Moon, Apollo 15 (the designation is re-used by a later mission), and Apollo 19.
- 1970 – Aeroflot Flight 3630, a Tupolev Tu-124 en route from southern Russia to Lithuania, crashes after the pilots lost control of the aircraft at cruise altitude between Rostov-on-Don Airport and Vilnius Airport, on the second leg of the flight; all 37 passengers and crew are killed.
- 1984 – Seven people are shot and killed and 12 wounded in the Milperra massacre, a shootout between the rival motorcycle gangs Bandidos and Comancheros in Sydney, Australia.
- 1985 – Sri Lankan Civil War: Sri Lankan Tamil politicians and former MPs M. Alalasundaram and V. Dharmalingam are shot dead.
- 1987 – In Moscow, the trial begins for 19-year-old pilot Mathias Rust, who flew his Cessna airplane into Red Square in May.
- 1990 – Transnistria is unilaterally proclaimed a Soviet republic; the Soviet president Mikhail Gorbachev declares the decision null and void.
- 1992 – The 7.7 M_{w} Nicaragua earthquake affects the west coast of Nicaragua. With a M_{s}–M_{w} disparity of half a unit, this tsunami earthquake triggers a tsunami that causes most of the damage and casualties, with at least 116 killed. Typical runup heights were 3–8 meters (9.8–26.2 ft).
- 1998 – Swissair Flight 111 crashes near Peggy's Cove, Nova Scotia; all 229 people on board are killed.
- 1998 – The UN's International Criminal Tribunal for Rwanda finds Jean-Paul Akayesu, the former mayor of a small town in Rwanda, guilty of nine counts of genocide.
- 2008 – Google launches its Google Chrome web browser.
- 2009 – The Andhra Pradesh, India helicopter crash occurs near Rudrakonda Hill, 40 nautical miles (74 km) from Kurnool, Andhra Pradesh, India. Fatalities include Y. S. Rajasekhara Reddy, the Chief Minister of the Indian state of Andhra Pradesh.
- 2010 – Israel-Palestinian conflict: the 2010 Israeli-Palestinian peace talks are launched by the United States.
- 2013 – The Eastern span replacement of the San Francisco–Oakland Bay Bridge opens at 10:15 pm at a cost of $6.4 billion, after the 1989 Loma Prieta earthquake damaged the old span.
- 2018 – National Museum of Brazil fire: A massive fire destroys most of the Paço de São Cristóvão, which houses the National Museum of Brazil, in Rio de Janeiro. The museum holds important archaeοlogical and anthropological objects, including the remains of the Luzia Woman, Marajoara vases and Egyptian mummies.
- 2019 – Hurricane Dorian, a category 5 hurricane, devastates the Bahamas, killing at least five.
- 2019 – The dive boat MV Conception catches fire and sinks near Santa Cruz Island, killing 34.
- 2022 – Eighteen people are killed and 23 others are injured by a suicide bombing at a Sunni mosque in Herat, Afghanistan.
- 2023 – India's first solar observation mission: The Indian Space Research Organisation (ISRO) successfully launches Aditya-L1 from Satish Dhawan space centre.
- 2024 – Four people are killed in a mass shooting targeting homeless people on a Chicago Transit Authority train in Forest Park, Illinois, United States.
- 2024 – A suicide bombing in Kabul, Afghanistan, kills six people and injures 13.
- 2024 – At least 129 inmates are killed and 59 more injured in an attempted prison break at Makala Prison in Kinshasa, Democratic Republic of the Congo.

== Births ==
=== Pre-1600 ===
- 1243 – Gilbert de Clare, 7th Earl of Gloucester, 6th Earl of Hertford, English politician (died 1295)
- 1251 – Francis of Fabriano, Italian writer (died 1322)
- 1516 – Francis I, Duke of Nevers (died 1561)
- 1531 – Francesco Cattani da Diacceto, Bishop of Fiesole (died 1595)
- 1548 – Vincenzo Scamozzi, Italian architect (died 1616)

=== 1601–1900 ===
- 1661 – Georg Böhm, German organist and composer (died 1733)
- 1675 – William Somervile, English poet and author (died 1742)
- 1753 – Marie Joséphine of Savoy (died 1810)
- 1778 – Louis Bonaparte, French-Dutch king (died 1846)
- 1805 – Esteban Echeverría, Argentinian poet and author (died 1851)
- 1810 – Lysander Button, American engineer (died 1898)
- 1810 – William Seymour Tyler, American historian and educator (died 1897)
- 1814 – Ernst Curtius, German archaeologist and historian (died 1896)
- 1820 – Lucretia Peabody Hale, American journalist and author (died 1900)
- 1830 – William P. Frye, American lawyer and politician (died 1911)
- 1838 – Bhaktivinoda Thakur, Indian guru and philosopher (died 1914)
- 1838 – Liliʻuokalani, Last sovereign monarch of Hawaiʻi (died 1917)
- 1839 – Henry George, American economist and author (died 1897)
- 1850 – Eugene Field, American author and poet (died 1895)
- 1850 – Albert Spalding, American baseball player, manager, and businessman, co-founded the Spalding Sporting Goods Company (died 1915)
- 1850 – Woldemar Voigt, German physicist and academic (died 1919)
- 1852 – Paul Bourget, French author and critic (died 1935)
- 1853 – Wilhelm Ostwald, Latvian-German chemist and academic, Nobel Prize laureate (died 1932)
- 1856 – John Bowser, English-Australian politician, 26th Premier of Victoria (died 1936)
- 1865 – Simeón Ola, Filipino general and politician (died 1952)
- 1866 – Charles Vintcent, South African cricketer and rugby player (died 1943)
- 1873 – Lily Poulett-Harris, Australian cricketer and educator (died 1897)
- 1877 – Frederick Soddy, English chemist and academic, Nobel Prize laureate (died 1956)
- 1878 – Herman, Estonian-Finnish archbishop (died 1961)
- 1878 – Werner von Blomberg, German field marshal (died 1946)
- 1883 – Archduchess Elisabeth Marie of Austria (died 1963)
- 1884 – Frank Laubach, American missionary and mystic (died 1970)
- 1892 – Dezső Kertész, Hungarian actor and film director (died 1965)
- 1894 – Joseph Roth, Austrian journalist and author (died 1939)
- 1897 – Fazlollah Zahedi, Iranian general and statesman, 36th Prime Minister of Iran (died 1963)

=== 1901–present ===
- 1901 – Andreas Embirikos, Greek psychoanalyst and poet (died 1975)
- 1901 – Adolph Rupp, American basketball player and coach (died 1977)
- 1904 – August Jakobson, Estonian author and politician (died 1963)
- 1907 – Pertev Naili Boratav, Turkish author and educator (died 1998)
- 1908 – Ruth Bancroft, American landscape and garden designer (died 2017)
- 1910 – Paul Saagpakk, Estonian linguist, lexicographer, and academic (died 1996)
- 1910 – Donald Watson, English activist, founded the Vegan Society (died 2005)
- 1911 – Romare Bearden, American painter and author (died 1988)
- 1911 – William F. Harrah, American businessman, founded Harrah's Entertainment (died 1978)
- 1911 – Lill Tschudi, Swiss artist (died 2004)
- 1912 – Ernest Bromley, Australian cricketer (died 1967)
- 1913 – Israel Gelfand, Russian-American mathematician and biologist (died 2009)
- 1913 – Bill Shankly, Scottish footballer and manager (died 1981)
- 1914 – Tom Glazer, American folk singer and songwriter ("A Dollar Ain't A Dollar Anymore", “On Top of Spaghetti”) (died 2003)
- 1915 – Benjamin Aaron, American lawyer and scholar (died 2007)
- 1916 – Ömer Lütfi Akad, Turkish director and screenwriter (died 2011)
- 1917 – Laurindo Almeida, Brazilian-American guitarist and composer (died 1995)
- 1917 – Cleveland Amory, American author and critic (died 1997)
- 1918 – Allen Drury, American journalist and author (died 1998)
- 1918 – Martha Mitchell, wife of US Attorney General John Mitchell (died 1976)
- 1919 – Marge Champion, American actress, dancer, and choreographer (died 2020)
- 1919 – Lance Macklin, English racing driver and businessman (died 2002)
- 1922 – Arthur Ashkin, American physicist and Nobel Prize laureate (died 2020)
- 1922 – Leigh Kamman, American radio host (died 2014)
- 1923 – René Thom, French mathematician, biologist, and academic (died 2002)
- 1923 – Ramón Valdés, Mexican actor and comedian (died 1988)
- 1924 – Daniel arap Moi, Kenyan educator and politician, 2nd President of Kenya (died 2020)
- 1924 – Sidney Phillips, USMC WW2 combat veteran, physician, and author (died 2015)
- 1925 – Hugo Montenegro, American composer and conductor (died 1981)
- 1927 – Milo Hamilton, American sportscaster (died 2015)
- 1927 – Francis Matthews, English actor (died 2014)
- 1927 – Alice Raftary, American educator of blind adults (died 2014)
- 1928 – Jim Jordan, Canadian educator and politician (died 2012)
- 1928 – Horace Silver, American pianist and composer (died 2014)
- 1928 – Mel Stuart, American director and producer (died 2012)
- 1929 – Hal Ashby, American actor, director, and producer (died 1988)
- 1929 – Beulah Bewley, English physician and academic (died 2018)
- 1929 – Rex Hartwig, Australian tennis player (died 2022)
- 1929 – Victor Spinetti, Welsh actor and director (died 2012)
- 1931 – Clifford Jordan, American saxophonist (died 1993)
- 1931 – Alan Simpson, American politician, US Senator from Wyoming (died 2025)
- 1932 – Walter Davis Jr., American pianist (died 1990)
- 1932 – Arnold Greenberg, American businessman, co-founded Snapple (died 2012)
- 1933 – Ed Conlin, American basketball player and coach (died 2012)
- 1933 – Mathieu Kérékou, Beninese soldier and politician, President of Benin (died 2015)
- 1934 – Hilla Becher, German conceptual photographer (died 2015)
- 1934 – Sam Gooden, American soul singer (died 2022)
- 1934 – Chuck McCann, American actor and screenwriter (died 2018)
- 1934 – Grady Nutt, American comedian, minister, and author (died 1982)
- 1935 – D. Wayne Lukas, American horse trainer (died 2025)
- 1936 – Andrew Grove, Hungarian-American businessman, engineer, and author (died 2016)
- 1936 – Joan Bennett Kennedy, American socialite, and 1st wife of US Senator from Massachusetts Ted Kennedy (died 2025)
- 1936 – Károly Krajczár, Hungarian-Slovene author and educator (died 2018)
- 1937 – Len Carlson, Canadian voice actor (died 2006)
- 1937 – Peter Ueberroth, American businessman
- 1938 – Leonard Appleyard, English diplomat, British Ambassador to China (died 2020)
- 1938 – Jimmy Clanton, American pop singer-songwriter
- 1938 – Ernie Sigley, Australian television host (died 2021)
- 1941 – Jyrki Otila, Finnish economist and politician (died 2003)
- 1941 – Sadhana Shivdasani, Indian actress (died 2015)
- 1941 – John Thompson, American basketball player, coach, and sportscaster (died 2020)
- 1943 – Rosalind Ashford, American singer
- 1943 – Glen Sather, Canadian ice hockey player and manager
- 1943 – Joe Simon, American singer-songwriter and producer (died 2021)
- 1944 – Janet Simpson, English sprinter (died 2010)
- 1946 – Luis Ávalos, Cuban-American actor (died 2014)
- 1946 – Mary Goudie, Baroness Goudie, English humanitarian and politician
- 1946 – Marty Grebb, American keyboardist, guitarist, saxophonist, and music producer/arranger (died 2020)
- 1946 – Billy Preston, American singer-songwriter, pianist, and actor (died 2006)
- 1946 – Walt Simonson, American author and illustrator
- 1946 – Dan White, American assassin and politician (died 1985)
- 1947 – Louis Michel, Belgian educator and politician, Belgian Minister of Foreign Affairs
- 1947 – Jim Richards, New Zealand racing driver
- 1948 – Nate Archibald, American basketball player and coach
- 1948 – Terry Bradshaw, American football player, sportscaster, and actor
- 1948 – Christa McAuliffe, American educator and astronaut (died 1986)
- 1949 – Hans-Hermann Hoppe, American economist and philosopher
- 1949 – Moira Stuart, British broadcaster
- 1950 – Rosanna DeSoto, American actress
- 1950 – Michael Rother, German guitarist, keyboard player, and songwriter
- 1950 – Tony Windsor, Australian politician
- 1951 – Jim DeMint, American politician
- 1951 – Mark Harmon, American actor and producer
- 1951 – Mik Kaminski, English musician, rock violinist
- 1952 – Jimmy Connors, American tennis player, coach, and sportscaster
- 1952 – Mihhail Lotman, Estonian linguist, scholar, and politician
- 1953 – Maurice Colclough, English rugby player (died 2006)
- 1953 – Ahmad Shah Massoud, Afghan commander and politician, Afghan Minister of Defense (died 2001)
- 1953 – John Zorn, American saxophonist, composer, and producer
- 1954 – Billi Gordon, American neuroscientist, author, and actor. (died 2018)
- 1954 – Gai Waterhouse, Scottish-Australian horse trainer and businesswoman
- 1954 – Andrej Babiš, Czech politician, Prime Minister of the Czech Republic
- 1955 – Linda Purl, American actress
- 1956 – Mario Tremblay, Canadian ice hockey player and coach
- 1957 – Tony Alva, American skateboarder and bass player
- 1957 – Steve Porcaro, American keyboard player and songwriter
- 1958 – Lynne Kosky, Australian social worker and politician (died 2014)
- 1959 – Drungo Hazewood, American baseball player (died 2013)
- 1959 – Guy Laliberté, Canadian businessman, philanthropist, and poker player, founded Cirque du Soleil
- 1960 – Eric Dickerson, American football player and sportscaster
- 1960 – Kristin Halvorsen, Norwegian politician, Norwegian Minister of Finance
- 1960 – Rex Hudler, American baseball player and sportscaster
- 1961 – Eugenio Derbez, Mexican actor, director, producer, and screenwriter
- 1961 – Carlos Valderrama, Colombian footballer and manager
- 1961 – Ron Wasserman, American singer-songwriter and producer
- 1962 – Alonso Lujambio, Mexican academic and politician (died 2012)
- 1962 – Prachya Pinkaew, Thai director, producer, and screenwriter
- 1962 – Tracy Smothers, American wrestler (died 2020)
- 1962 – Keir Starmer, English lawyer and politician, Prime Minister of the United Kingdom
- 1963 – Sam Mitchell, American basketball player and coach
- 1964 – Andrea Illy, Italian businessman
- 1964 – Keanu Reeves, Canadian actor, singer, and producer
- 1965 – Lennox Lewis, English-Canadian boxer
- 1965 – Partho Sen-Gupta, Indian director and screenwriter
- 1966 – Dino Cazares, American guitarist, songwriter, and producer
- 1966 – Massimo Cuttitta, Italian rugby player and coach
- 1966 – Salma Hayek, Mexican-American actress, director, and producer
- 1966 – Olivier Panis, French racing driver
- 1966 – Tuc Watkins, American actor
- 1967 – Frank Fontsere, American drummer and songwriter
- 1967 – Andreas Möller, German footballer and manager
- 1968 – Cynthia Watros, American actress
- 1968 – Francisco Acevedo, American serial killer
- 1969 – Laurence Brihaye, Belgian rhythmic gymnast
- 1969 – K-Ci, American R&B singer-songwriter
- 1969 – Stéphane Matteau, Canadian ice hockey player
- 1971 – Kjetil André Aamodt, Norwegian skier
- 1971 – Pawan Kalyan, Indian actor politician
- 1971 – Tommy Maddox, American football player and coach
- 1971 – César Sánchez, Spanish footballer
- 1971 – Tom Steels, Belgian cyclist
- 1971 – Katt Williams, American comedian and actor
- 1972 – Robert Coles, English golfer
- 1973 – Jason Blake, American ice hockey player
- 1973 – Indika de Saram, Sri Lankan cricketer
- 1973 – Matthew Dunn, Australian swimmer
- 1973 – Nicholas Pinnock, English actor
- 1973 – Sudeep, Indian actor, filmmaker and television presenter
- 1974 – Sami Salo, Finnish ice hockey player
- 1975 – Jill Janus, American singer (died 2018)
- 1975 – MC Chris, American rapper, actor, and screenwriter
- 1975 – Tony Thompson, American singer (died 2007)
- 1976 – Syleena Johnson, American R&B and soul singer-songwriter and actress
- 1976 – Aziz Zakari, Ghanaian sprinter
- 1977 – Tiffany Hines, American actress
- 1977 – Frédéric Kanouté, Malian footballer
- 1977 – Sam Rivers, American musician (died 2025)
- 1979 – Tomer Ben Yosef, Israeli footballer
- 1979 – Jonathan Kite, American actor and comedian
- 1979 – Brian Westbrook, American football player
- 1980 – Dany Sabourin, Canadian ice hockey player
- 1980 – Danny Shittu, Nigerian footballer
- 1980 – Hiroki Yoshimoto, Japanese race car driver
- 1981 – Fariborz Kamkari, Iranian director, producer, and screenwriter
- 1981 – Jennifer Hopkins, American tennis player
- 1981 – Chris Tremlett, English cricketer
- 1982 – Joey Barton, English footballer
- 1982 – Jason Hammel, American baseball player
- 1982 – Mark Phillips, English footballer
- 1983 – Mark Foster, English rugby player
- 1984 – Jack Peñate, English singer-songwriter and guitarist
- 1985 – Keith Galloway, Australian rugby league player
- 1985 – Allison Miller, American actress
- 1986 – Gélson Fernandes, Swiss footballer
- 1986 – Kyle Hines, American basketball player
- 1987 – Scott Moir, Canadian ice dancer
- 1987 – Spencer Smith, American musician
- 1988 – Keisuke Kato, Japanese actor and singer
- 1988 – Javi Martínez, Spanish footballer
- 1988 – Ibrahim Šehić, Bosnian footballer
- 1988 – Ishant Sharma, Indian cricketer
- 1988 – Ishmeet Singh, Indian singer (died 2008)
- 1989 – Marcus Morris, American basketball player
- 1989 – Markieff Morris, American basketball player
- 1989 – Alexandre Pato, Brazilian footballer
- 1989 – Zedd, Russian-German record producer, DJ, multi-instrumentalist and songwriter
- 1990 – Marcus Ericsson, Swedish race car driver
- 1990 – Shayla Worley, American gymnast
- 1991 – Christian Bethancourt, Panamanian baseball player
- 1991 – Mareks Mejeris, Latvian basketball player
- 1991 – Gyasi Zardes, American footballer
- 1992 – Xenia Knoll, Swiss tennis player
- 1992 – Nenad Lukić, Serbian footballer
- 1992 – Alberto Masi, Italian footballer
- 1992 – Emiliano Martínez, Argentine footballer
- 1992 – Ella Toone, English footballer
- 1993 – Tom Anderson, English footballer
- 1993 – Zaza Nadiradze, Georgian sprint canoeist
- 1993 – Robert Rooba, Estonian ice hockey player
- 1994 – Ishika Taneja, Indian beautician.
- 1994 – Linda Dallmann, German professional footballer
- 1995 – Willy Adames, Dominican baseball player
- 1995 – Aleksander Barkov, Russian-Finnish ice hockey player
- 1995 – Deimantas Petravičius, Lithuanian footballer
- 1996 – Austin Abrams, American actor
- 1997 – 645AR, American rapper
- 1997 – Brandon Ingram, American basketball player
- 1998 – Nickeil Alexander-Walker, Canadian basketball player
- 1998 – Choi Ye-bin, South Korean actress
- 1998 – Eetu Luostarinen, Finnish ice hockey player
- 2002 – Bradley Barcola, French footballer

== Deaths ==
=== Pre-1600 ===
- 421 – Constantius III, Roman emperor
- 459 – Simeon Stylites, Byzantine saint (born 390)
- 595 – John IV of Constantinople
- 1022 – Máel Sechnaill mac Domnaill, king of Mide and High King of Ireland
- 1031 – Saint Emeric of Hungary (born 1000)
- 1083 – King Munjong of Goryeo (born 1019)
- 1274 – Prince Munetaka, Japanese shōgun (born 1242)
- 1397 – Francesco Landini, Italian composer
- 1540 – Dawit II of Ethiopia (born 1501)

=== 1601–1900 ===
- 1606 – Karel van Mander, Dutch painter and poet (born 1548)
- 1651 – Kosem Sultan, Ottoman Valide sultan and regent (born 1589)
- 1680 – Per Brahe the Younger, Swedish soldier and politician, Lord High Steward of Sweden (born 1602)
- 1688 – Sir Robert Vyner, 1st Baronet, English businessman and politician, Lord Mayor of London (born 1631)
- 1690 – Philip William, Elector Palatine, German Count Palatine of Neuburg (born 1615)
- 1764 – Nathaniel Bliss, English astronomer and mathematician (born 1700)
- 1765 – Henry Bouquet, Swiss-English colonel (born 1719)
- 1768 – Antoine Deparcieux, French mathematician and theorist (born 1703)
- 1790 – Johann Nikolaus von Hontheim, German historian and theologian (born 1701)
- 1813 – Jean Victor Marie Moreau, French general (born 1763)
- 1820 – Jiaqing Emperor of China (born 1760)
- 1832 – Franz Xaver von Zach, Hungarian-French astronomer and academic (born 1754)
- 1834 – Thomas Telford, Scottish engineer and architect, designed the Menai Suspension Bridge (born 1757)
- 1865 – William Rowan Hamilton, Irish physicist, astronomer, and mathematician (born 1805)
- 1872 – N. F. S. Grundtvig, Danish pastor, philosopher, and author (born 1783)
- 1877 – Konstantinos Kanaris, Greek admiral and politician, 16th Prime Minister of Greece (born 1793)
- 1885 – Giuseppe Bonavia, Maltese architect (born 1821)
- 1898 – Wilford Woodruff, American religious leader, 4th President of The Church of Jesus Christ of Latter-day Saints (born 1807)

=== 1901–present ===
- 1910 – Henri Rousseau, French painter (born 1844)
- 1911 – Marie Andrieu, French anarchist, cartomancer and spiritualist (born 1851)
- 1918 – John Forrest, Australian politician, 1st Premier of Western Australia (born 1847)
- 1921 – Henry Austin Dobson, English poet and critic (born 1840)
- 1922 – Henry Lawson, Australian poet and author (born 1867)
- 1927 – Umegatani Tōtarō II, Japanese sumo wrestler, the 20th Yokozuna (born 1878)
- 1934 – James Allan, New Zealand rugby player (born 1860)
- 1934 – Russ Columbo, American singer, violinist, and actor (born 1908)
- 1934 – Alcide Nunez, American clarinet player (Original Dixieland Jass Band) (born 1884)
- 1937 – Pierre de Coubertin, French historian and educator, founded the International Olympic Committee (born 1863)
- 1941 – Lloyd Seay, American race car driver (born 1919)
- 1942 – Tom Williams, Executed Irish Republican (born 1923)
- 1942 – James Juvenal, American rower (born 1874)
- 1943 – Marsden Hartley, American painter and poet (born 1877)
- 1944 – Bella Rosenfeld, Russian-American model and author (born 1895)
- 1945 – Mason Phelps, American golfer (born 1885)
- 1948 – Sylvanus Morley, American archaeologist and spy (born 1883)
- 1953 – Hendrik Offerhaus, Dutch rower (born 1875)
- 1953 – Jonathan M. Wainwright, American general, Medal of Honor recipient (born 1883)
- 1954 – Franz Leopold Neumann, German lawyer and political scientist (born 1900)
- 1962 – William Wilkerson, American publisher and businessman (born 1890)
- 1964 – Glenn Albert Black, American archaeologist and scholar (born 1900)
- 1964 – Alvin C. York, American colonel, Medal of Honor recipient (born 1887)
- 1965 – Johannes Bobrowski, German poet and author (born 1917)
- 1969 – Ho Chi Minh, Vietnamese politician, 1st President of Vietnam (born 1890)
- 1971 – Robert Mensah, Ghanaian footballer (born 1939)
- 1973 – Carl Dudley, American director, producer, and screenwriter (born 1910)
- 1973 – J. R. R. Tolkien, English novelist, short story writer, poet, and philologist (born 1892)
- 1975 – Mabel Vernon, American activist (born 1883)
- 1976 – Stanisław Grochowiak, Polish poet and playwright (born 1934)
- 1977 – Stephen Dunne, American actor (born 1918)
- 1978 – Fred G. Meyer, American businessman, founded Fred Meyer (born 1886)
- 1979 – Otto P. Weyland, American general (born 1903)
- 1983 – Feri Cansel, Turkish-Cypriot actress (born 1944)
- 1984 – Manos Katrakis, Greek actor (born 1908)
- 1985 – M. Alalasundaram, Sri Lankan Tamil teacher and politician
- 1985 – Abe Lenstra, Dutch footballer (born 1920)
- 1985 – V. Dharmalingam, Sri Lankan Tamil politician (born 1918)
- 1985 – Jay Youngblood, American wrestler (born 1955)
- 1987 – Brian Clay, Australian rugby league player (born 1935)
- 1990 – Robert Holmes à Court, South African-Australian businessman and lawyer (born 1937)
- 1991 – Alfonso García Robles, Mexican politician and diplomat, Nobel Prize laureate (born 1911)
- 1992 – Barbara McClintock, American geneticist and botanist, Nobel Prize laureate (born 1902)
- 1996 – Paddy Clift, Zimbabwean cricketer (born 1953)
- 1997 – Rudolf Bing, Austrian-American manager (born 1902)
- 1997 – Viktor Frankl, Austrian neurologist and psychiatrist (born 1905)
- 1998 – Jackie Blanchflower, Northern Irish footballer (born 1933)
- 1998 – Allen Drury, American journalist and author (born 1918)
- 2000 – Elvera Sanchez, American dancer (born 1905)
- 2000 – Curt Siodmak, German-American author and screenwriter (born 1907)
- 2001 – Christiaan Barnard, South African surgeon and academic (born 1922)
- 2001 – Troy Donahue, American actor (born 1936)
- 2002 – Dick Reynolds, Australian footballer and coach (born 1915)
- 2004 – Joan Oró, Catalan biochemist and academic (born 1923)
- 2005 – Bob Denver, American actor (born 1935)
- 2006 – Bob Mathias, American decathlete and politician (born 1930)
- 2006 – Willi Ninja, American dancer and choreographer (born 1961)
- 2006 – Dewey Redman, American saxophonist (born 1931)
- 2007 – Franz-Benno Delonge, German game designer, created TransAmerica (born 1957)
- 2007 – Max McNab, Canadian ice hockey player and coach (born 1924)
- 2008 – Bill Melendez, Mexican-American animator, director, producer, and voice actor (born 1916)
- 2008 – Alan Waddell, Australian walker
- 2009 – Y. S. Rajasekhara Reddy, Indian politician, 14th Chief Minister of Andhra Pradesh (born 1949)
- 2011 – Roberto Bruce, Chilean journalist (born 1979)
- 2011 – Felipe Camiroaga, Chilean television presenter (born 1966)
- 2012 – Mark Abrahamian, American guitarist (born 1966)
- 2012 – Jack Boucher, American photographer and director (born 1931)
- 2012 – John C. Marshall, English singer-songwriter and guitarist (born 1941)
- 2012 – Emmanuel Nunes, Portuguese-French composer and educator (born 1941)
- 2013 – Valérie Benguigui, French actress and director (born 1965)
- 2013 – Terry Clawson, English rugby player and coach (born 1940)
- 2013 – Ronald Coase, English-American economist and author, Nobel Prize laureate (born 1910)
- 2013 – David Jacobs, English radio and television host (born 1926)
- 2013 – Frederik Pohl, American author and publisher (born 1919)
- 2013 – Paul Scoon, Grenadian politician, 2nd Governor-General of Grenada (born 1935)
- 2014 – F. Emmett Fitzpatrick, American lawyer and politician, 20th District Attorney of Philadelphia (born 1930)
- 2014 – Norman Gordon, South African cricketer (born 1911)
- 2014 – Helena Rakoczy, Polish gymnast (born 1921)
- 2014 – Goolam Essaji Vahanvati, Indian lawyer and politician, 13th Attorney General of India (born 1949)
- 2015 – Ephraim Engleman, American rheumatologist, author, and academic (born 1911)
- 2016 – Jerry Heller, American music manager (born 1940)
- 2016 – Islam Karimov, Uzbek politician, 1st President of Uzbekistan (born 1938)
- 2018 – Claire Wineland, American activist and author (born 1997)
- 2021 – Siddharth Shukla, Indian TV and film actor (born 1980)
- 2021 – Mikis Theodorakis, Greek composer (born 1925)
- 2022 – Frank Drake, American radio astronomer and astrophysicist (born 1930)
- 2022 – T. V. Sankaranarayanan, Indian Carnatic vocalist (born 1945)
- 2024 – James Darren, American actor (born 1936)
- 2024 – Rodolfo Hernández Suárez, Colombian politician (born 1945)

== Holidays and observances ==
- Christian feast day:
  - Acepsimas of Hnaita and companions (Syriac Orthodox Church)
  - Agricola of Avignon
  - Antoninus of Pamiers
  - Brocard
  - Diomedes
  - Eleazar
  - Hieu (abbess)
  - Holy September Martyrs
  - Ingrid of Sweden
  - Justus of Lyon
  - Margaret of Louvain
  - Maxima of Rome
  - Nonnosus
  - William of Roskilde
  - September 2 (Eastern Orthodox liturgics)
- Democracy Day (Tibet)
- Independence Day (Transnistria, unrecognized)
- Independence Day (Artsakh, unrecognized)
- National Blueberry Popsicle Day (United States)
- National Day, celebrates the independence of Vietnam from Japan and France in 1945
- Victory over Japan Day (United States)
- Sedantag (German Empire)
