= Muanda Nsemi =

Congolese religious leader and politician (1946–2023)

Leader of Bundu dia Kongo
- In office 1986 – 18 October 2023
- Preceded by: Position established
- Succeeded by: TBD

Personal details
- Born: Zacharie Badiengila; 1946 Luozi Territory, Belgian Congo
- Died: 18 October 2023 (aged 77) Kinshasa, Democratic Republic of the Congo
- Party: BDK
- Occupation: Religious leader

Zacharie Badiengila, known as Ne Muanda Nsemi, (1946 – 18 October 2023) was a Congolese religious leader and politician. He was leader of the political and religious movement Bundu dia Kongo (BDK).

== Biography ==
Born in Luozi Territory in 1946, Badiengila took on the name Ne Muanda Nsemi, which means "the creative spirit" in Kikongo. He resided in Kinshasa and was a chemist by occupation. He considered himself a spiritual heir of Simon Kimbangu, a preacher and prophet of Kimbanguism. He also defined himself as a political heir of Joseph Kasa-Vubu, who served as President and supported the resurrection of the Kingdom of Kongo. Like his mentors, he came from the former Bas-Congo.

Nsemi founded the BDK in 1969, but officially created the organization in 1986 to expand into politics, as it was originally a cultural association. He wrote several works in Kikongo, including Mvutu kua PSV, a response to the Spiritual Power of the Verb of Bavua Ntinu André. He served in the National Assembly and was an unsuccessful candidate for Vice-Governor.

Nsemi was accused of translating texts of the PSV without express authorization in order to teach them to his followers. During the 2006 elections, he accused President Joseph Kabila of being a "Rwandan who wants to monopolize the DRC", and his movement participated in the Bas-Congo riots of February 2007. Another clash broke out for several days in Kinshasa and ended on 3 March 2017 by his arrest and incarceration at Makala Central Prison. He escaped during a planned jailbreak with the support of militants who started a fire at the penitentiary.

Nsemi disappeared after his escape and was thought to be dead, but reappeared during the administration of Félix Tshisekedi in 2019. Initially hoping for amnesty from Joseph Olenghankoy, he then accused Tshisekedi of marrying a Rwandan woman. He carried out another attack in March 2020 in different towns in the Kongo Central province. He was arrested the following month and admitted to a neuro-psychopathical center in Kinshasa. Some MPs pleaded with authorities in his favor, and he was released after long negotiations. He apologized to Tshisekedi and the first lady.

Ne Muanda Nsemi died in Kinshasa on 18 October 2023, at the age of 77.
