= Emmanuel Dungia =

Congolese diplomat

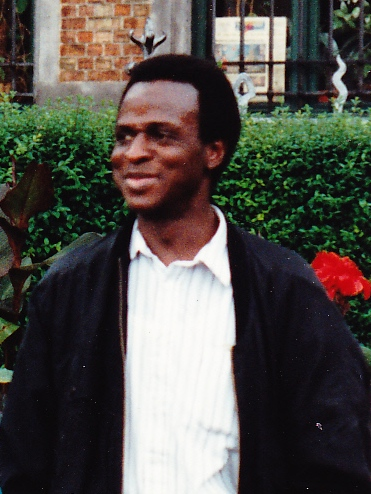
- Brussels, Belgium, 1993
- Born: 20 April 1948; Bondaki, Sud-Ubangi, Belgian Congo
- Died: 1 February 2006 (aged 57); Brussels, Belgium
- Other names: Emmanuel Dungia Mosi Nagifi; Emmanuel Dedetemo
- Education: UCLouvain
- Known for: Mobutu et l’argent du Zaïre: les révélations d'un diplomate, ex-agent des Services secrets, Paris, L'Harmattan, 1992, ISBN 2-7384-1133-9, ISBN 978-2-7384-1133-4.; Likasi 2001 trial.

Emmanuel Dungia (20 April 1948 – 1 February 2006) was a diplomat of the Democratic Republic of Congo (DRC) and author of the political book: Mobutu and the money of Zaïre: the revelations of a diplomat, former Secret Services agent (Mobutu et l’argent du Zaïre: les révélations d'un diplomate, ex-agent des Services secrets). The latter includes the report prepared for the International Monetary Fund by Erwin Blumenthal, former Director of Foreign Affairs of the Bundesbank. Dungia was also imprisoned but was eventually acquitted by the Congolese government for his alleged involvement in a plot to overthrow Laurent Kabila who was assassinated 16 January 2001.

== Early life and education ==
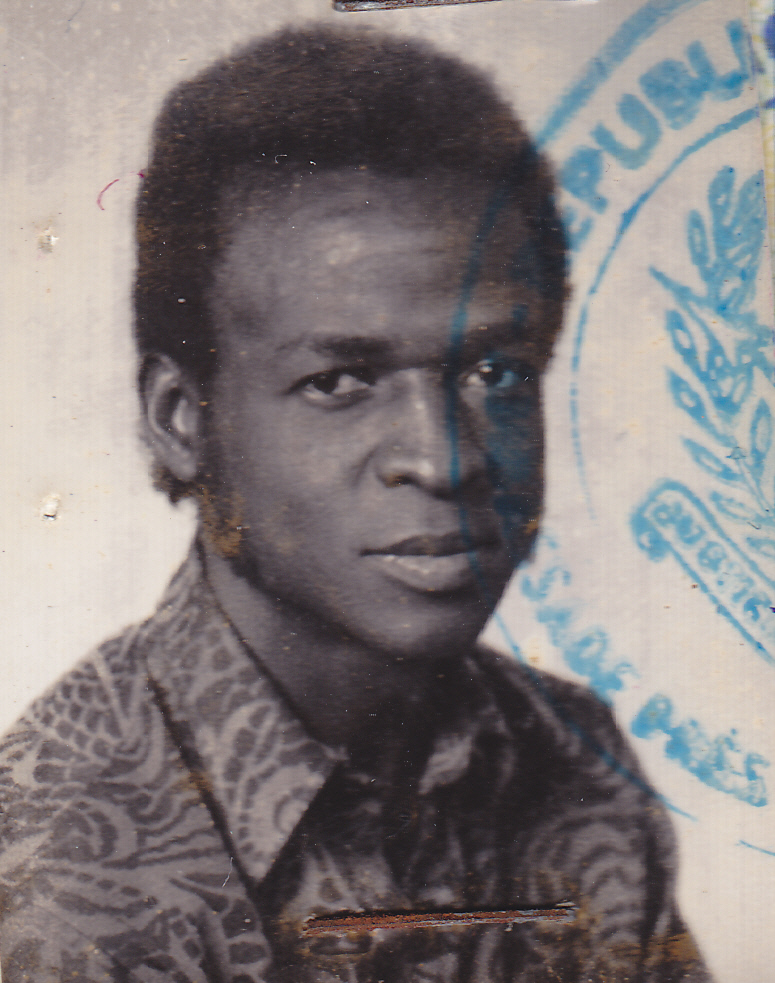
Emmanuel Dungia

Emmanuel Dungia was the son of François Zoambe Kuku Dungia, a male nurse and Wivine Yumbe Mbisala, a housewife who had given birth to him in Bondaki, an area around Gemena in the region of Sud-Ubangi District in the province of the Équateur in the Belgian Congo (present-day Democratic Republic of the Congo).

=== Education ===
In 1952, he started primary school at the Catholic Mission of Bosobolo (Mission catholique de Bosobolo).

As a young adult Dungia worked for a short while before continuing his studies. He then gets hired by the Advance for Home Funds (Maisons des Fonds d’avance) service. Unhappy with the job, Dungia returns to studying, enrolling at Lovanium University (université Lovanium), where he is admitted in the Trade section of the Economics Faculty.

Dungia then became professor of mathematics at the Lumumba Athenaeum (Athénée Lumumba) in the municipality of Limete in Kinshasa. Shortly after resuming studies in his second year at university, he obtained a scholarship from the European Common Market to study commercial engineering. In the fall of 1969–70, Dungia was admitted at the University of Louvain (UCLouvain).

In 1977, he graduated from commercial and financial sciences at the Saint-Louis Higher Institute of Commerce (Institut supérieur de Commerce Saint-Louis) in Brussels.

== Career under Mobutu Sese Seko ==
=== Intelligence services ===
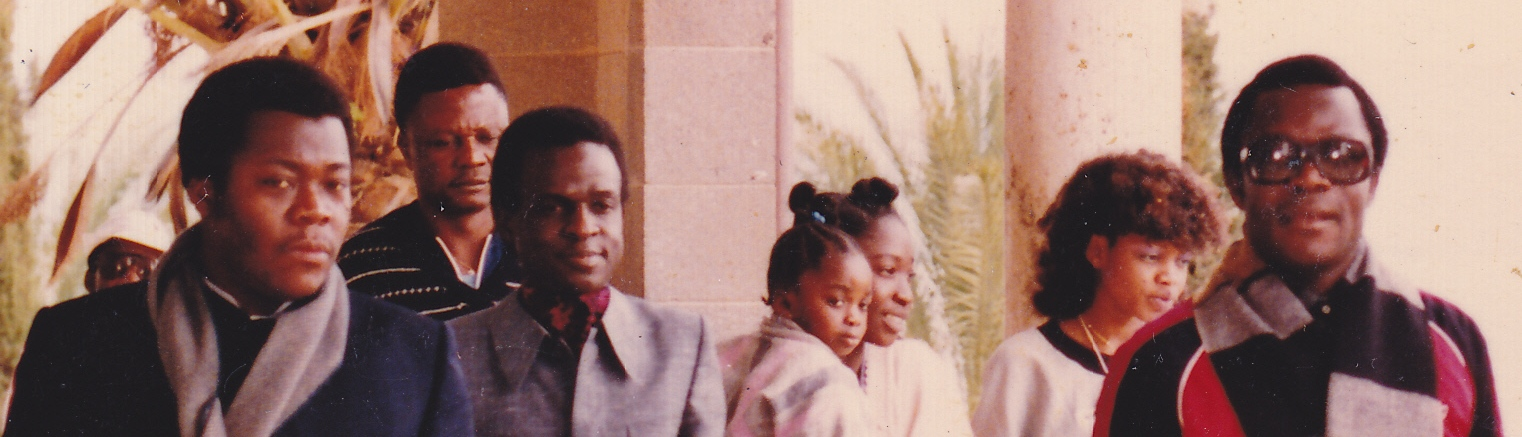
Emmanuel Dungia, Israel 1985

In February 1978, Emmanuel Dungia left Belgium to return permanently to Zaïre where shortly after his return he was hired in the Finance administration department as an Inspector of Finance.

Dungia obtained his position in the intelligence services through acquaintances at the University of Leuven, who introduced him to Seti Yale, at the time the chief of the Zairian security service. Dungia reported that later that he realized that Seti's action might have been dictated by the need to collect some information on his rival in leadership around Mobutu, Honoré Ngbanda.

After training in the Zairian intelligence services for a month, Dungia was first assigned as assistant, then as the head of security at the Ndjili International Airport. In 1979, he was transferred to the central management research department (service d’études à la direction centrale).

=== Diplomatic assignments in Europe ===
Dungia was sent on diplomatic missions to Paris (1980–81), Brussels (1981–86) and the Vatican (1986–89). In 1989, he returned to Kinshasa working as a liaison security agent under the official title of diplomatic adviser to Foreign Minister Nguza Karl-I-Bond. However, since 1986 Dungia had grown uncomfortable with Mobutu's management system that he referred to as "criminal".

In April 1990, Mobutu's political regime evolved into a multi-party system. After the formation of the first transitional government, the Minister's Office of Nguza gives way to that of Mushobekwa Kalimba Wa Katana. However, Dungia refused to reinstate the security service as a result of the latter cabinet restructuring.

=== First exile and publications ===
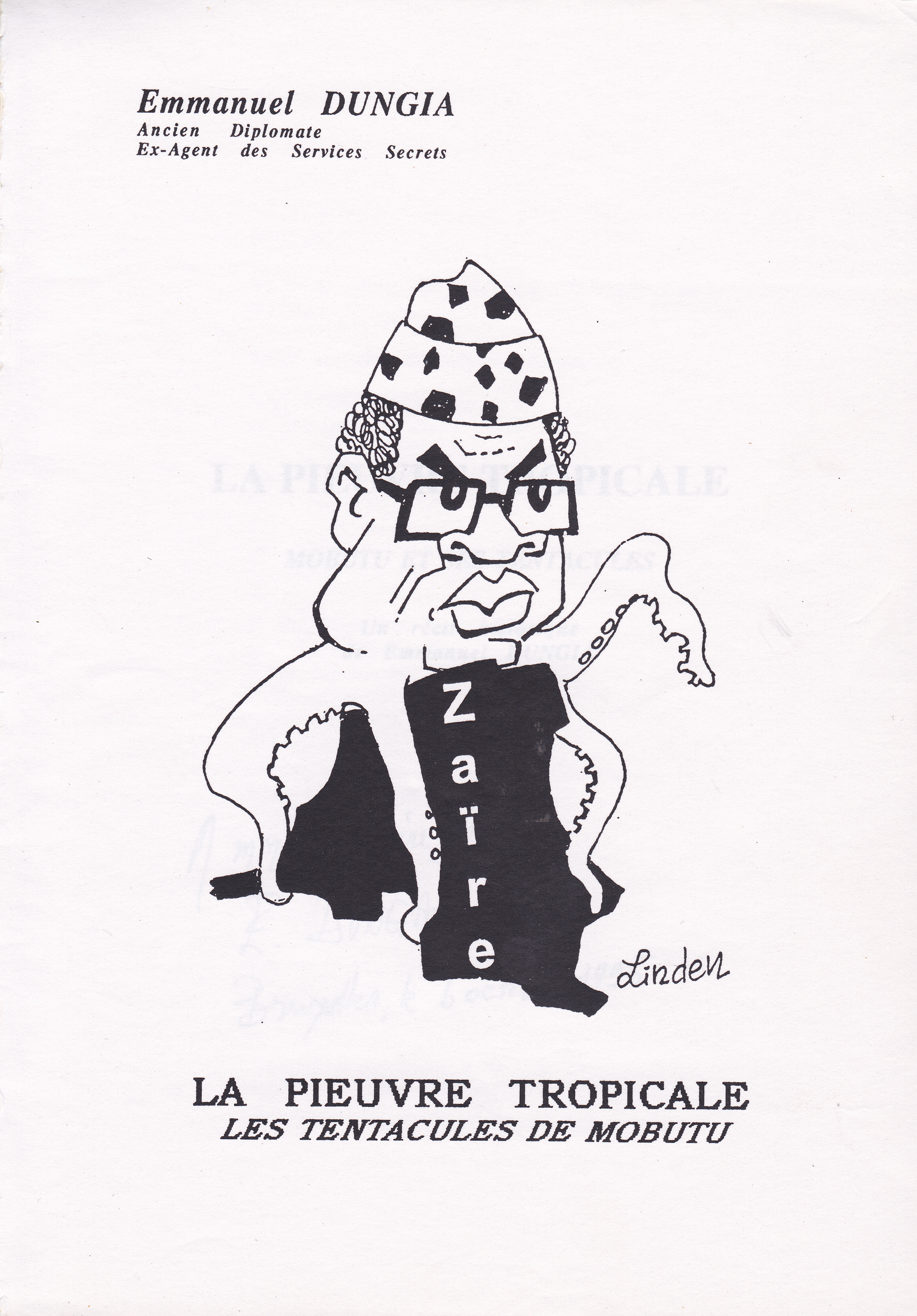
Page couverture du livre La pieuvre tropicale. Les tentacules de Mobutu à Bruxelles

After having completed the manuscript of his book Mobutu et l’argent du Zaïre, which went on sale on 28 January 1992, he prepared himself for exile in Belgium. The book becomes an international success, but Dungia accused the director of l’Harmattan, the published, of systematically deceiving authors (especially Africans) on the number of works printed and sold. The book had been used by participants of the Conference on National Sovereignty (Conférence nationale souveraine).

In 1995, Dungia lived under police protection in Belgium with his children. In September of that year he accepted a job at a non-profit organization dealing with people with psychological problems, prisoners and aliens seeking a positive resolution of their immigration status in Belgium.

He also published The tropical octopus. The instruments of Mobutu (La pieuvre tropicale. Les tentacules de Mobutu), a lesser success than his first book.

== Career under Laurent-Desire Kabila ==
DRC flag in use under Laurent Kabila

At the end of September 1996, Mobutu's political regime faced an insurrection in Kivu Province. Rebel troops supported by Rwanda and Uganda marched on Kinshasa. After the fall of Kisangani on 15 March 1997, businessman Jeannot Bemba Saolona and Ambassador Pelendo charge Dungia with the mission to deliver in Goma a message from the Ngbaka people to the leader of the rebellion Laurent Kabila, speaking on the behalf of the Ngbaka community.

In April 1997, Dungia was tentatively assigned as a diplomatic adviser to the Cabinet of Dr. Bizima Karaha who served as Minister of Foreign Affairs. With the overthrow of the Mobutu government on 17 May 1997, the new president Laurent Kabila appoints Dungia Goodwill Ambassador. He subsequently goes on mission to South Africa to meet with President Nelson Mandela. Upon his return, Dungia was appointed Chief of the diplomatic mission in Pretoria, following the arrest of its former head shortly before the trip to South Africa.

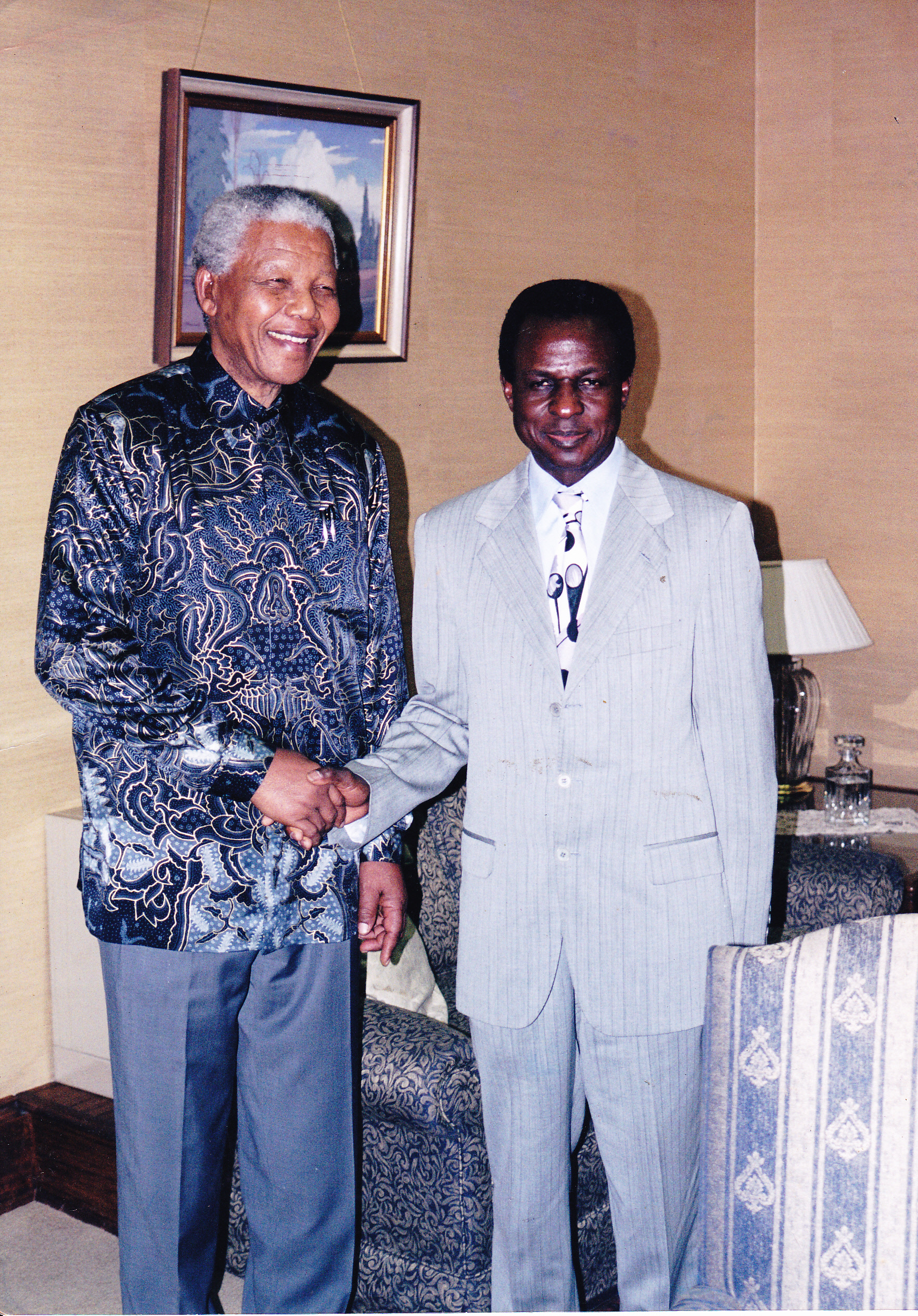
Nelson Mandela and Emmanuel Dungia, Pretoria, South Africa, August 1997

Dungia was appointed ambassador to Bangui in July 1998, with jurisdiction over the Republic of Congo and Chad. According to his own reports, he was deeply mistrusted by the DRC government and faced harassment. Citing a lack of accreditation document as Ambassador of the DRC, Dungia returns to Kinshasa after two days in Chad as the Central African authorities refuse to receive him.

In 1999, Laurent Kabila decided that Dungia should return to South Africa, but the South African authorities did not respond to DRC's request for the accreditation of its Ambassador.

In May 2000, Kabila appointed him as his Special Adviser to Georges Leta, the deputy assistant chief of the National Intelligence Agency. However, after Nelly Ntwite, the President's private secretary, fed false information that Dungia was supposedly an agent of Ngbaka rebel Jean-Pierre Bemba, Dungia was placed under surveillance by Kabila until his assassination on 16 January 2001.

=== Arrest and 2nd exile ===
On 19 February 2001, Dungia was arrested by the security department of the Presidential Guard on allegations of being involved in a plot to overthrow the new president Joseph Kabila. Eleven officers of the Armed Forces of the Democratic Republic of Congo. He was transferred to Makala Central Prison. On 13 September 2001, Dungia is "acquitted" by the Military Court due to international pressure.

With the assistance of the Voice of the voiceless (Voix des sans-voix), one of the non-governmental organizations that had supported the cause of the prisoners unjustly accused in the trial, Dungia attempted to make the irregularities in the trial public, but the event was prohibited under threat by the Military Court. Dungia instead published the text of his statement in the paper La Tempête des Tropiques on 28 September 2001. The Congolese government tried to abduct him one night in the Protestant Center where he had settled with his wife upon his release from prison. In April 2002, he fled with his wife to Brazzaville.

== Career under Joseph Kabila ==
Congo Flag used under Joseph Kabila

On 21 July 2003, Dungia returned to DRC at the invitation of Vice-President Azarias Ruberwa, president of the former rebel movement, the Congolese Rally for Democracy (Rassemblement Congolais pour la Démocratie). Dungia subsequently joined Azarias Ruberwa’ Cabinet in 2004.

In 2005, Emmanuel Dungia was appointed Ambassador to the European Union but died of cancer in a hospital in Brussels before he taking office. He was replaced by Corneille Yambu-a-Ngoyi in August 2006.

== Personal life ==
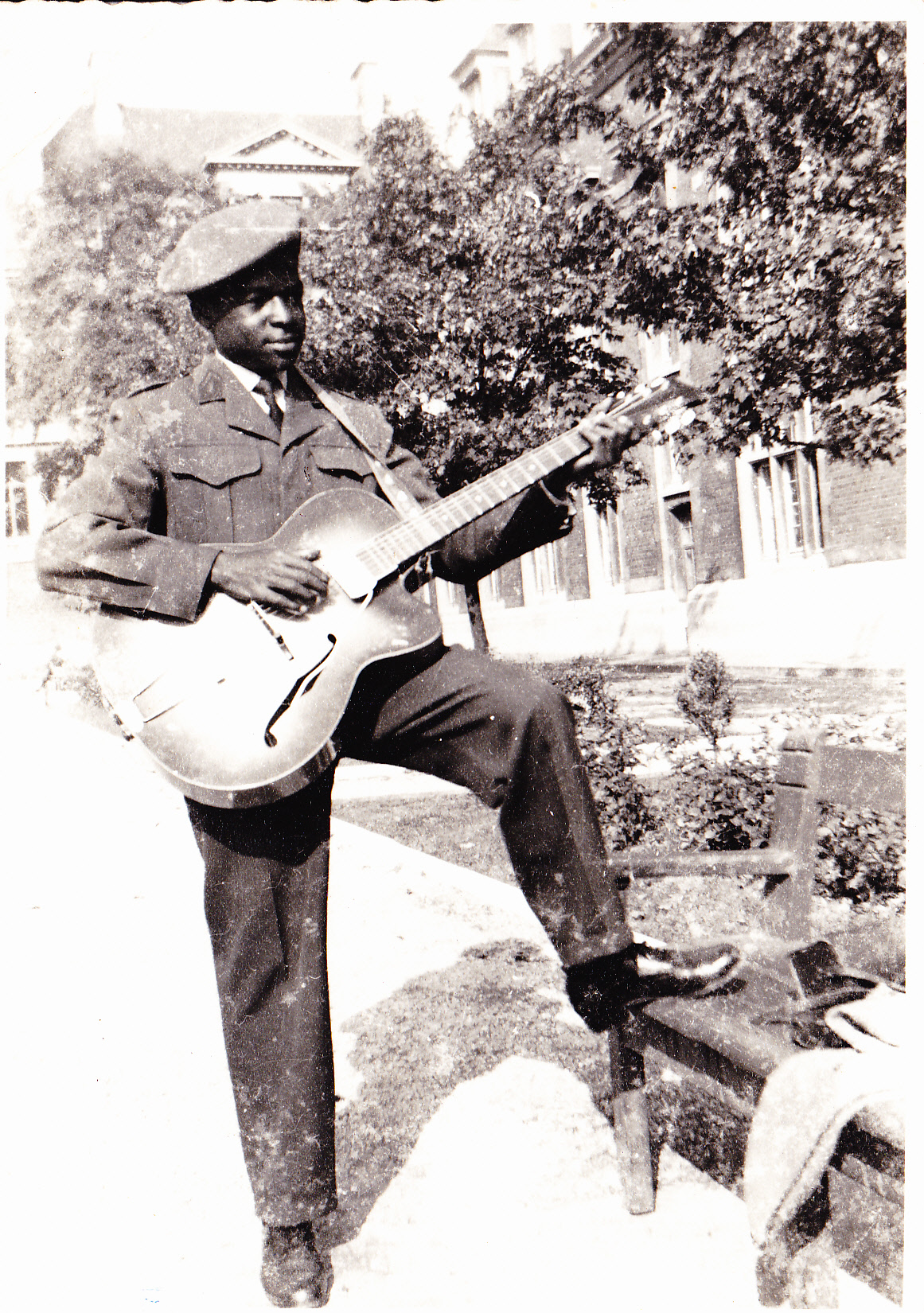
Emmanuel Dungia, École Royale des Cadets, Brussels (Laeken), 1962

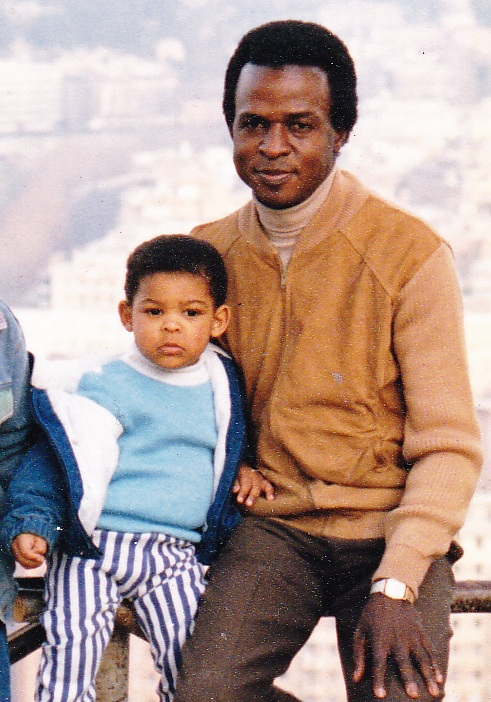
Dena (son) and Emmanuel Dungia, Rome, Italy, February 1989

=== Family background ===
Emmanuel Dungia was born Emmanuel Dedetemo. De de te mo translates literally into Ngbaka by doing to yourself. Figuratively, one interpretation would be: Take care of yourself without letting anyone influence you.

The name DUNGIA comes from NDUNGIA, from which the "N" letter was removed in 1957 when changes to make Congolese surnames uniform and legal were implemented by the colonial authority. Ndungia exists in the Ngbaka tribe, but is not commonly used and its significance is unknown. The Belgian colonial authority procedures were overturned by colonel Mobutu in 1967 when he introduced the concept of authentic Congolese nationalism or authentic Zairian revolution whose sole purpose was to erase the colonial history of the country.

Emmanuel Dungia was the father of 4 children.

In 1998 Dungia married for the second time but his wife would be fatally struck by sudden illness in November 2004, a few months after their return from Brazzaville.

=== Health and death ===
During his stay in South Africa between 1997 and 1998 Dungia was diagnosed with cancer that might have developed as early as 1995. It was thought to be a benign cancer that could be treated successfully. Without treatment he was expected to live only another 5 years.

Dungia had aversion, if not an extreme fright of hospitals and especially surgical rooms, and could not stand the sight of blood. As a consequence, he failed to follow his treatment as advised until 2005 when he was forced to return to Brussels for medical care that ultimately proved unsuccessful.

He died on 1 February 2006.
