= Puissance spirituelle du verbe =

Spiritual organization

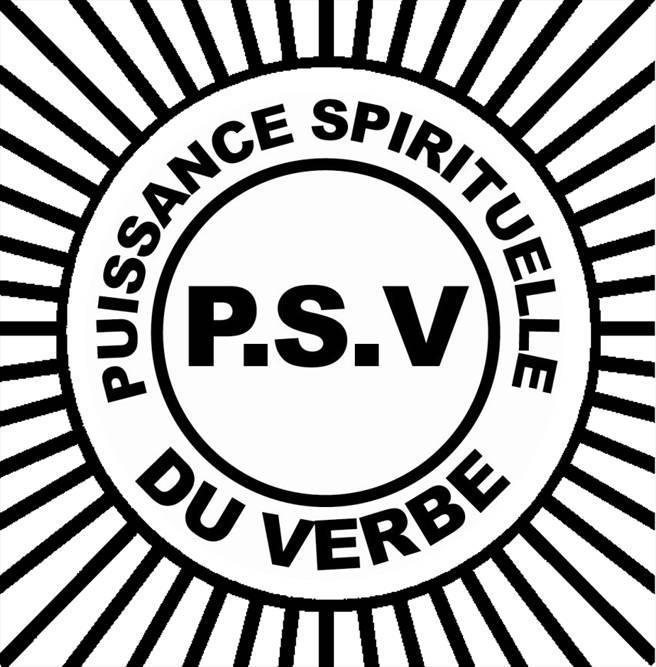
- Founder: Bavua Ntinu Decantor Andrew
- Type: Non-profit organization Non-governmental organization
- Location(s): Crystal Mountains, Congo DR

The Puissance Spirituelle du Verbe (English: Spiritual Power of the Verb) in acronym PSV, is a so-called spiritual organization for Africa and the awakening of the black man in general, created on February 23, 1980, by Bavua Ntinu and present in 4 African countries.

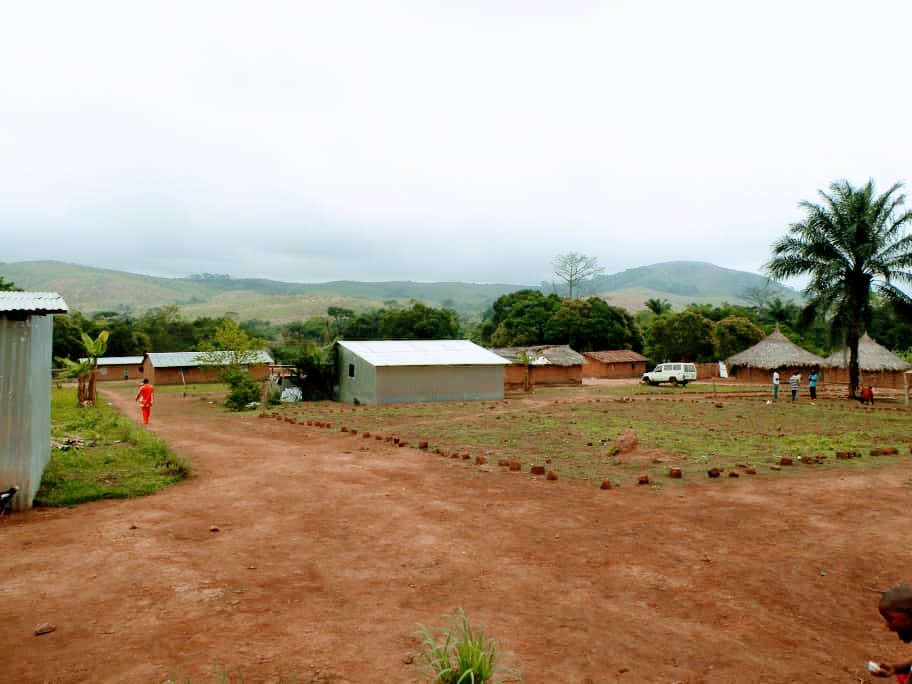
Spiritual City of Kikandikila (DRC)

It is an initiatory order which advocates the spiritual purification of all that exists by cleaning the bodies at the same time spiritual, astral and physical, by the use of sound and divine light, through techniques and codes that allow get in touch with any entity existing but, according to its initiator, the absence of spiritual masters and true prophets in the black race has been lacking for years, which explains the delay experienced by blacks and especially their ignorance of the greatness of the universe, according to him.

== See also ==
- Muanda Nsemi

== Bibliography ==
- Ne Muanda Nsemi (Bundu dia Kongo) (1998). Puissance Spirituelle du Verbe (Congo) - Mvutu kua PSV (in Kongo). Kinshasa: Ndietika Mpolo Ngimbi. p. 32. OCLC 77781332.
