= 2017 Makala jailbreak =

2017 jailbreak at the Makala Central Prison

2017 Makala jailbreak attempt
- Date: 17 May 2017
- Venue: Makala Central Prison
- Location: 4°21′45″S 15°17′9″E
- Type: Mass jailbreak
- Perpetrator: Prison inmates
- Participants: 4000+
- Outcome: Over 4000 prisoners escaped
- Deaths: ~100

On 17 May 2017, a mass jailbreak at Makala Central Prison in Kinshasa, Democratic Republic of the Congo, resulted in the deaths of up to 100 people.

== Background ==
Makala Central Prison is the biggest prison in the Democratic Republic of the Congo. It only has a capacity of 1,500, and holds both male and female prisoners. The inside is unguarded. Since its 1957 Belgian Congo creation, jailbreaks are common in the DRC.

== Jailbreak ==
It was believed that around half of the prison's inmates fled during the attack. In the initial attack, around 50 prisoners got away when armed men attacked the prison. Government officials said a police officer and at least five attackers were killed, while several sources say that up to 100 died in the unrest.

== Perpetrators ==
The attack was carried out by followers of the political-religious sect Bundu Dia Kongo in order to free their leader Ne Muanda Nsemi and 50 other inmates, with Nsemi the alleged mastermind of the attack. Nsemi was freed and disappeared after the escape, until May 2019, when he was rearrested.

== See also ==
- 2024 Makala jailbreak attempt
