= Lysander Button =

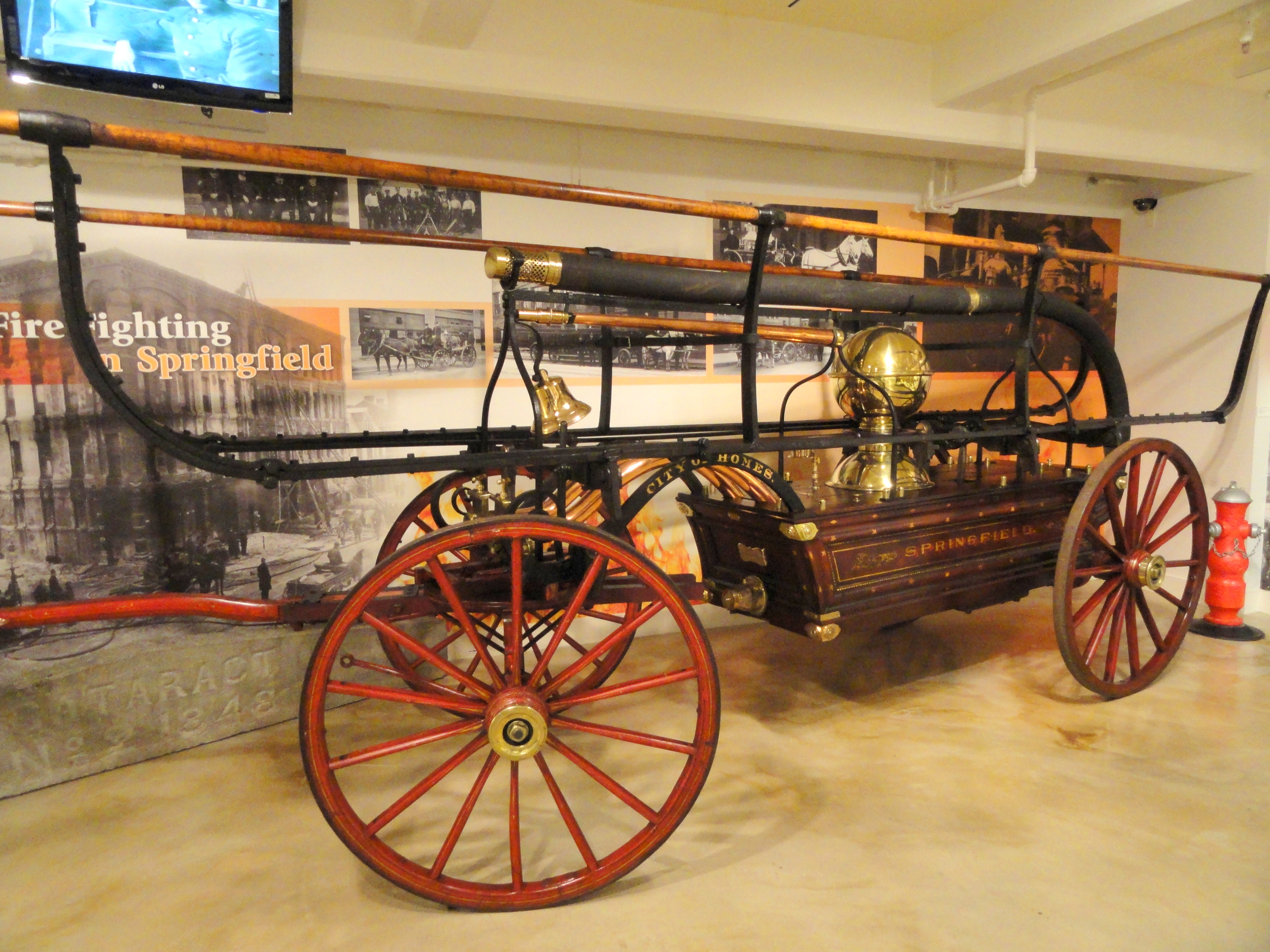
Side-Stroke Fire Engine, 1872, L. Button & Sons, Waterford NY - Lyman & Merrie Wood Museum of Springfield History - DSC04148

Lysander Button (September 2, 1810 – July 29, 1898) was the inventor of many of the early improvements made on hand and steam fire engines. Many of those improvements made their way to the modern fire engines of today.

Button was born in North Haven, Connecticut on September 2, 1810 but moved with his parents to Albany by 1825. After John Rogers relocated his machine shop from Albany to a spot on King’s Canal in Waterford, Saratoga County, New York, Button found a job there as a machinist. Rogers manufactured fire engines and had even submitted two patents in the 1830s (the copies of which have unfortunately been lost). Rogers sold the shop to William Platt and Judge Nicholas Doe, who expanded the product line to include other castings such as iron water wheels. Without the advantages of a formal education, Button became foreman in the shop by 1833 and was named a partner the following year.

In 1841, Platt sold his share of the business to Button, who became the sole owner after Judge Doe died. For the next fifteen years the business was known as L. Button & Company, which continued to operate on Kings Canal. Button later moved to a steam-powered building on Third Street in the Village of Waterford. Most of his innovations were for the so-called “hand-pumper” fire engines. He possessed remarkable gifts in mechanical engineering, since by 1838 he had developed the first “piano engine” which delivered water from the front end of the trunk of the device. Another notable improvement was the “runaround” that returned water to the suction to relieve pressure on the hose. In 1841 he developed the first fire engine water pump, with valves set at an angle of 45 degrees and straight-level waterways from the inlet to the outlet.

Upon coming of age, Lysander’s eldest son Theodore became involved with the company, and the name was changed to Button & Son. From 1873 to 1891 Theodore submitted some half a dozen patents, including improvements in hose and pipe couplings, feed water regulators, and steam engines. Two patents were assigned to his brother Charles, who seems to have remained affiliated with the fire engine business even after it was sold to other parties.

In 1876, the Button Steamer won the Centennial Award at the Philadelphia International Exhibition for its simplicity, strength, and reliability. However, after spending almost half a century manufacturing fire engines, Lysander decided to retire in 1882 and sell the entire works, including the rights to his many patents, to Holroyd & Company of Waterford.

Years later, Button fire engines continued to be manufactured by the American Fire Engine Company, which was formed in 1891 by the consolidation of the Button Fire Engine Works, Silsby Manufacturing Company, Ahrens Manufacturing Company, and Clapp & Jones. In 1900, a group of New York investors formed the International Fire Engine Company, which included American Fire Engine, LaFrance Fire Engine Company, and Thomas Manning Jr. & Company.

Button and his wife Abigail Ranney had five children: May Josephine, Eliza, Theodore, Julia, and Charles. After retiring, Lysander took a special interest in local schools by serving on the Board of Trustees and advocating for clean water in the school system. He was also prominent in the Presbyterian Church, becoming a ruling elder. He was superintendent of the Sunday school for 25 years and was a teacher there until within one year of his death, which occurred on July 29, 1898. About 750 Button fire engines were sold throughout the world, and many still exist in working condition, used for parades and in contests. The Waterford Historical Museum was able to obtain the Button & Blake hand pumper called the “Converse” in 2005 so that history fans now and in the future may see an original Button fire engine in person.

== Sources ==
- Handbook of Modern Steam Fire Engines, Stephen Roper, 1897.
- Standard of the Age: A Brief History of the Button Fire Engine Works, Brad Utter, 2007.
- Invented in Saratoga County, Timothy Starr, 2008.
- History of the American Steam Fire Engine, William King, 1850.
