= Bundu dia Kongo =

Religious and nationalist movement among the Kongo people

- Logo of Bundu dia Kongo
- Leader: Vacant
- Dates active: 1986–present
- Active regions: Kinshasa, DR Congo
- Ideology: Kongo nationalism Separatism; New religion

Bundu dia Kongo (Kikongo; lit. "Gathering of Kongo"), known as BDK, is a new religious movement with a political and cultural agenda that is associated with the Kongo ethnic group. It was founded in June 1969 but officially in 1986 by Ne Muanda Nsemi, who was the group's leader until his death and is mainly based in the Kongo Central (Bas-Congo) province in the Democratic Republic of the Congo.

== Ideology ==
Bundu dia Kongo supports the creation of an ethnically-Kongo state with borders similar to the pre-colonial Kingdom of Kongo during the 15th century that would encompass parts of the modern-day Democratic Republic of the Congo, Angola, Gabon and the Republic of the Congo. Like the new religious movement Kimbanguism, BDK has mystical elements and claims independence leader Simon Kimbangu as their prophet, but Kimbanguist leaders have refused to recognize BDK as a religious movement.

Likewise, the government of the Democratic Republic of the Congo characterises BDK as an insurrectionist group that advocates violence against "illegitimate" governments. It claims that it operates weapons training in remote rural churches. General Muyamba Nsiona has characterized the organization as a paramilitary organisation.

== Clashes with the police ==
In 2002, police shot and killed 14 followers of Bundu dia Kongo at a demonstration. In February 2007, the followers of Bundu dia Kongo demonstrated against alleged corruption in the provincial elections, which led to violent clashes with the police and the military in Matadi, Muanda, Boma and Songololo. Human Rights Watch estimates that the clashes resulted in the death of 104 people.

In late February and early March 2008, the followers of Bundu dia Kongo clashed with the police in and around Luozi and Seke-Banza. According to the police, the clashes resulted in the death of 25 people (22 of them in Luozi) and many wounded. Nsemi, who said that he had called for calm and a neutral investigation, alleged that the police had killed 80 people in Luozi and 40 in Seke-Banza. Later, in May, corpses of 40 people were unearthed in five mass graves in Sumbi, in the territory of Seke-Banza. Later in March 2008, the Congolese government banned Bundu dia Kongo.

United Nations Mission in the Democratic Republic of Congo (MONUC) carried out a special inquiry into the events. The report concludes that at least 100 people, mainly members of Bundu dia Kongo, were killed in the police operations in Bas-Congo. According to the report, the high death toll resulted from excessive use of force, when the police armed with AK-47s opened fire on BDK members, who were armed with sharp sticks, stones and kola nuts. A large number of bodies were dumped in rivers and mass graves in an attempt to conceal evidence. Also over 200 buildings were burned and the police looted private houses.

BDK upholds a presence in the western part of Congo and their idea of resisting all western influence has also resulted in attacks on for example Christian churches. In February 2017, new violent clashes between Congolese police and BDK activists were reported in Kimpese, resulting in at least eight group members being killed. On 17 May 2017, BDK followers freed their leader, Ne Muanda Nsemi, and 50 other inmates after attacking and causing a jailbreak at the Makala jail in Kinshasa, Democratic Republic of the Congo.

In March 2020, police dispersed several BDK members in Kinshasa for defying a ban on gatherings of more than 20 people imposed to halt the spread of the coronavirus pandemic. Between 13 and 24 April 2020, about 20 sect members and police officers were killed in three separate clashes on a key highway in the Kongo Central province, following BDK blockades in the towns of Boma, Kisantu, Sona-Bata, Kisundi, and Songololo. On April 24, Nsemi's house in Kinshasa was raided. According to the interior minister, 8 people were killed; 35 were injured, including Nsemi and 8 police officers; and 168 were arrested, although Human Rights Watch claimed that at least 33 were killed, and put the total death toll of all the raids at 55. Nsemi, then about 70 years old, was taken to the hospital with a head injury before being handed over to prosecutors. The police response was condemned by Human Rights Watch as excessive, noting for example, that the April 22 raid in Songololo killed at least 15 people, and included burning down the targeted house and allegedly putting some of the bodies on public display.
