= 2024 Makala jailbreak attempt =

2024 attempted jailbreak at the Makala Central Prison

- Date: September 2, 2024
- Venue: Makala Central Prison, Selembao, Kinshasa, Democratic Republic of the Congo
- Location: 4°21′45″S 15°17′9″E
- Type: Failed jailbreak
- Perpetrator: Prison inmates
- Participants: 200+
- Outcome: At least 129 deaths
- Deaths: 129-200+
- Injuries: 59+

On 2 September 2024, an attempted jailbreak at Makala Central Prison in Kinshasa, Democratic Republic of the Congo, resulted in the deaths of at least 129 people and more than 59 other injuries. A prison official said that no inmates escaped, but inmates and human rights groups said that there were around 2,000 fewer prisoners in the facility immediately after the incident. Part of the prison was set on fire.

== Background ==
Makala Central Prison, the biggest in the Democratic Republic of the Congo, has capacity for 1,500 prisoners and holds both male and female prisoners. However, it is highly overcrowded, housing between 14,000 and 15,000 inmates. In 2020, it was estimated that more than 90% of the people held at the prison were awaiting trial, and only 6% were actually serving sentences.

Jailbreaks are common in the DRC. In 2017, another prison break occurred at Makala prison, which led to more than 4,000 prisoners escaping.

== Attempted jailbreak ==
Local residents and inmates reported that gunfire inside the prison started on 1 September in Block 4 following a power outage inside the facility that started at 21:00 and lasted into the morning of 2 September. Congolese Interior Minister Jacquemin Shabani said that 24 inmates were fatally shot by guards as they tried to escape, and that there were cases of women being raped. Authorities said that 129 people were killed, some by gunfire and others in a stampede. However, Emmanuel Adu Cole, a prison rights activist, said that the death toll was more than 200. Authorities denied that any inmates successfully escaped, but inmates and prisoners' rights groups said that roll calls found that the number of prisoners in Makala was reduced by nearly 2,000 following the incident.

Multiple buildings in the prison sustained extensive damage, including a part of the prison which the government said was set on fire. The prison's administrative building, food depots, and hospital were damaged by the fires, while its archives were destroyed.

== Aftermath and reactions ==
Families of the victims called for more responsibility, clarity, and answers from the government regarding the conditions that led to the incident, as did human rights groups. Several inmates involved in the incident were subsequently tried in military courts.

The Congolese government urged judges to stop sending people to Makala as a stopgap, but the prison remained open. However, no visitors have been allowed in as of 4 September.

Deputy Prime Minister for Interior and Security Jacquemain Shabani said that a special commission has been set up to continue investigating "deplorable and unfortunate events". Justice Minister Constant Mutamba called the attempted jailbreak a "premeditated act of sabotage". Government officials said that provisional measures to accelerate the construction of a new prison on the capital's outskirts were underway. The prison's director, Joseph Yusufu Maliki, was suspended by Mutamba and went into hiding.

The Delegation of the European Union to the Democratic Republic of Congo on 4 September called on Congolese authorities "to quickly shed light on these tragic events in order to establish the various responsibilities, including with regard to respect for human rights and the rule of law."

On 21 September, 600 inmates, including ten minors, were released from Makala as part of efforts to decongest the facility, while 1,700 inmates suffering from illness were released on 23 September.

== See also ==
- 2017 Makala jailbreak
