= Bavua Ntinu André =

Spiritual master of the psv

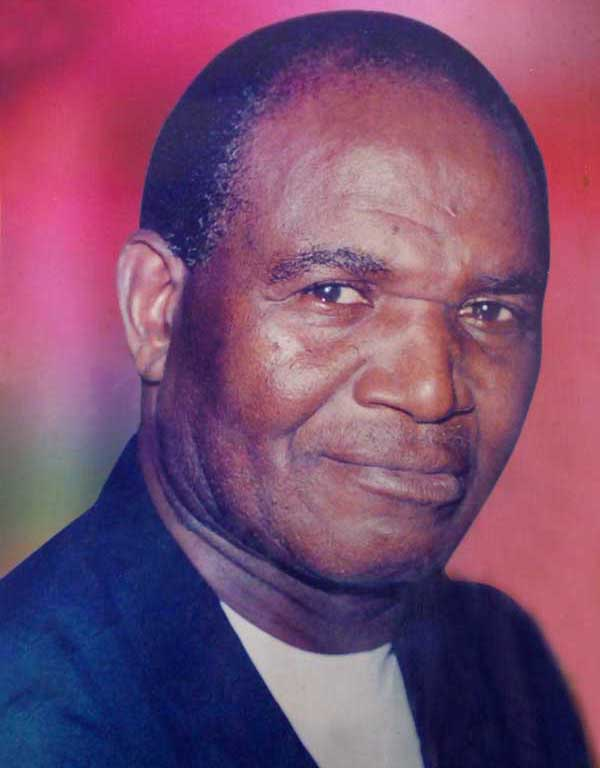
- Born: Bavua Ntinu; March 22, 1939; Mbanza-Ngungu, Belgian Congo
- Died: 5 October 2013 (aged 74); Mbanza-Ngungu, Democratic Republic of the Congo
- Occupations: Religious leader and martial art practitioner
- Known for: Puissance spirituelle du verbe; founder of the National School of Martial Arts

Bavua Ntinu André (March 22, 1939 – October 5, 2013) was a martial art practitioner and initiator of Japanese sports (Karate and Judo) in the Democratic Republic of the Congo known as the Great Master Bavua Ntinu Decantor, founder of the National School of Martial Arts (EMAM) and, Supreme Chief of Spiritual Power of the Verb (PSV), which he was also founder and first spiritual leader of the organization.

On October 8, 2023, in Kinshasa, during the commemoration of the 10th anniversary of the death of the founder of martial arts in the DRC, a request was submitted to the government by Master Gana Etebe Tampwo, president of the Congolese Federation of Shinkyokushin Full Contact Karate (FECOSHI), for his posthumous decoration and the recognition of his merits, as the initiator of Japanese sports in the Democratic Republic of Congo and the trainer of many disciples. And on July 12, 2025, he was honored by the National Network of Congolese Athletes (RNSC) for the indelible mark he left on the history of martial arts in the DRC.
