= List of foreign ministers in 1998 =

This is a list of foreign ministers in 1998.

== Africa ==
- Algeria - Ahmed Attaf (1996-1999)
- Angola - Venâncio da Silva Moura (1992-1999)
- Benin -
  1. Pierre Osho (1996-1998)
  2. Antoine Idji Kolawolé (1998-2003)
- Botswana - Mompati Merafhe (1994-2008)
- Burkina Faso - Ablassé Ouedraogo (1994-1999)
- Burundi -
  1. Luc Rukingama (1996-1998)
  2. Severin Ntahomvukiye (1998-2001)
- Cameroon - Augustin Kontchou Kouomegni (1997-2001)
- Cape Verde -
  1. Amílcar Spencer Lopes (1996-1998)
  2. José Luís de Jesus (1998-2000)
- Central African Republic - Jean-Mette Yapende (1997-1999)
- Chad - Mahamat Saleh Annadif (1997-2003)
- Comoros -
  1. Ibrahim Ali Mzimba (1997-1998)
  2. Salim Himidi (1998)
  3. Nidhoim Attoumane (1998-1999)
- Republic of Congo - Rodolphe Adada (1997-2007)
- Democratic Republic of Congo -
  1. Bizima Karaha (1997-1998)
  2. Jean-Charles Okoto (1998-1999)
- Côte d'Ivoire - Amara Essy (1990-2000)
- Djibouti - Mohamed Moussa Chehem (1995-1999)
- Egypt - Amr Moussa (1991-2001)
- Equatorial Guinea - Miguel Oyono Ndong Mifumu (1993-1999)
- Eritrea - Haile Woldetensae (1997-2000)
- Ethiopia - Seyoum Mesfin (1991-2010)
- Gabon - Casimir Oyé-Mba (1994-1999)
- The Gambia -
  1. Omar Njie (1997-1998)
  2. Momodou Lamin Sedat Jobe (1998-2001)
- Ghana - Victor Gbeho (1997-2001)
- Guinea - Lamine Camara (1996-1999)
- Guinea-Bissau - Fernando Delfim da Silva (1996-1999)
- Kenya -
  1. Kalonzo Musyoka (1993-1998)
  2. Bonaya Godana (1998-2001)
- Lesotho -
  1. Kelebone Maope (1995-1998)
  2. Tom Thabane (1998-2002)
- Liberia - Monie Captan (1996-2003)
- Libya - Umar Mustafa al-Muntasir (1992-2000)
- Madagascar -
  1. Herizo Razafimahaleo (1997-1998)
  2. Lila Ratsifandrihamanana (1998-2002)
- Malawi - Mapopa Chipeta (1997-1999)
- Mali - Modibo Sidibe (1997-2002)
- Mauritania -
  1. Mohamed El Hacen Ould Lebatt (1997-1998)
  2. Cheikh El Avia Ould Mohamed Khouna (1998)
  3. Ahmed Ould Sid'Ahmed (1998-2001)
- Mauritius - Rajkeswur Purryag (1997-2000)
- Morocco - Abdellatif Filali (1985-1999)
  - Western Sahara -
    1. Bachir Mustafa Sayed (1997-1998)
    2. Mohamed Salem Ould Salek (1998–2023)
- Mozambique - Leonardo Simão (1994-2005)
- Namibia - Theo-Ben Gurirab (1990-2002)
- Niger - Maman Sambo Sidikou (1997-1999)
- Nigeria -
  1. Tom Ikimi (1995-1998)
  2. Ignatius Olisemeka (1998-1999)
- Rwanda - Anastase Gasana (1994-1999)
- São Tomé and Príncipe - Homero Jeronimo Salvaterra (1996-1999)
- Senegal -
  1. Moustapha Niasse (1993-1998)
  2. Jacques Baudin (1998-2000)
- Seychelles - Jérémie Bonnelame (1997-2005)
- Sierra Leone -
  1. Paolo Bangura (1997-1998)
  2. Sama Banya (1998-2001)
- Somalia - no central government
  - Somaliland - Mahmud Salah Nur (1997-2001)
- South Africa - Alfred Baphethuxolo Nzo (1994-1999)
- Sudan -
  1. Ali Osman Taha (1995-1998)
  2. Mustafa Osman Ismail (1998-2005)
- Swaziland -
  1. Arthur Khoza (1995-1998)
  2. Albert Nhlanhla Shabangu (1998-2001)
- Tanzania - Jakaya Kikwete (1995-2006)
- Togo -
  1. Koffi Panou (1996-1998)
  2. Joseph Kokou Koffigoh (1998-2000)
- Tunisia - Said Ben Mustapha (1997-1999)
- Uganda - Eriya Kategaya (1996-2001)
- Zambia - Keli Walubita (1997-2002)
- Zimbabwe - Stan Mudenge (1995-2005)

== Asia ==
- Afghanistan -
  1. Mullah Abdul Jalil (1997-1998)
  2. Mullah Mohammad Hassan (1998-1999)
- Armenia -
  1. Alexander Arzumanyan (1996-1998)
  2. Vartan Oskanian (1998-2008)
- Azerbaijan -
  1. Hasan Hasanov (1993-1998)
  2. Tofig Zulfugarov (1998-1999)
  - Nagorno-Karabakh - Naira Melkumian (1997-2002)
- Bahrain - Sheikh Muhammad ibn Mubarak ibn Hamad Al Khalifah (1971-2005)
- Bangladesh - Abdus Samad Azad (1996-2001)
- Bhutan -
  1. Dawa Tsering (1972-1998)
  2. Jigme Thinley (1998-2003)
- Brunei - Pengiran Muda Mohamed Bolkiah (1984–2015)
- Cambodia -
  1. Ung Huot (1994-1998)
  2. Hor Namhong (1998–2016)
- China -
  1. Qian Qichen (1988-1998)
  2. Tang Jiaxuan (1998-2003)
- Georgia - Irakli Menagarishvili (1995-2003)
  - Abkhazia - Sergei Shamba (1997-2004)
  - South Ossetia - Murat Dzhioyev (1998-2012)
- India -
  1. I. K. Gujral (1996-1998)
  2. Atal Bihari Vajpayee (1998)
  3. Jaswant Singh (1998-2002)
- Indonesia - Ali Alatas (1988-1999)
- Iran - Kamal Kharazi (1997-2005)
- Iraq - Muhammad Saeed al-Sahhaf (1992-2001)
- Israel -
  1. David Levy (1996-1998)
  2. Benjamin Netanyahu (1998)
  3. Ariel Sharon (1998-1999)
- Japan -
  1. Keizō Obuchi (1997-1998)
  2. Masahiko Kōmura (1998-1999)
- Jordan -
  1. Fayez al-Tarawneh (1997-1998)
  2. Jawad Anani (1998)
  3. Abdul Ilah Khatib (1998-2002)
- Kazakhstan - Kassym-Jomart Tokayev (1994-1999)
- North Korea -
  1. Kim Yong-nam (1983-1998)
  2. Paek Nam-sun (1998-2007)
- South Korea -
  1. Yu Jong-ha (1996-1998)
  2. Bak Jeong-su (1998)
  3. Hong Soon-young (1998-2000)
- Kuwait - Sheikh Sabah Al-Ahmad Al-Jaber Al-Sabah (1978-2003)
- Kyrgyzstan - Muratbek Imanaliyev (1997-2002)
- Laos - Somsavat Lengsavad (1993-2006)
- Lebanon -
  1. Farès Boueiz (1992-1998)
  2. Selim al-Hoss (1998-2000)
- Malaysia - Abdullah Ahmad Badawi (1991-1999)
- Maldives - Fathulla Jameel (1978-2005)
- Mongolia -
  1. Shukher Altangerel (1997-1998)
  2. Rinchinnyamyn Amarjargal (1998)
  3. Nyam-Osoryn Tuyaa (1998-2000)
- Myanmar -
  1. Ohn Gyaw (1991-1998)
  2. Win Aung (1998-2004)
- Nepal -
  1. Kamal Thapa (1997-1998)
  2. Girija Prasad Koirala (1998-1999)
- Oman - Yusuf bin Alawi bin Abdullah (1982–2020)
- Pakistan -
  1. Gohar Ayub Khan (1997-1998)
  2. Sartaj Aziz (1998-1999)
- Philippines - Domingo Siazon, Jr. (1995-2001)
- Qatar - Sheikh Hamad bin Jassim bin Jaber Al Thani (1992-2013)
- Saudi Arabia - Prince Saud bin Faisal bin Abdulaziz Al Saud (1975–2015)
- Singapore - S. Jayakumar (1994-2004)
- Sri Lanka - Lakshman Kadirgamar (1994-2001)
- Syria - Farouk al-Sharaa (1984-2006)
- Taiwan - Jason Hu (1997-1999)
- Tajikistan - Talbak Nazarov (1994-2006)
- Thailand - Surin Pitsuwan (1997-2001)
- Turkey - İsmail Cem (1997-2002)
- Turkmenistan - Boris Şyhmyradow (1995-2000)
- United Arab Emirates - Rashid Abdullah Al Nuaimi (1980-2006)
- Uzbekistan - Abdulaziz Komilov (1994-2003)
- Vietnam - Nguyễn Mạnh Cầm (1991-2000)
- Yemen -
  1. Abd al-Karim al-Iryani (1994-1998)
  2. Abdul Qadir Bajamal (1998-2001)

== Australia and Oceania ==
- Australia - Alexander Downer (1996-2007)
- Fiji - Berenado Vunibobo (1997-1999)
- Kiribati - Teburoro Tito (1994-2003)
- Marshall Islands - Phillip H. Muller (1994-2000)
- Micronesia - Epel K. Ilon (1997-2000)
- Nauru -
  1. Kinza Clodumar (1997-1998)
  2. Bernard Dowiyogo (1998-1999)
- New Zealand - Don McKinnon (1990-1999)
  - Cook Islands - Inatio Akaruru (1989-1999)
- Palau - Sabino Anastacio (1997-2000)
- Papua New Guinea - Roy Yaki (1997-1999)
- Samoa -
  1. Tofilau Eti Alesana (1988-1998)
  2. Tuilaepa Sailele Malielegaoi (1998–2021)
- Solomon Islands - Patterson Oti (1997-2000)
- Tonga -
  1. Prince Tupouto'a Tungi (1979-1998)
  2. Baron Vaea (1998)
  3. Prince 'Ulukalala Lavaka Ata (1998-2004)
- Tuvalu - Bikenibeu Paeniu (1996-1999)
- Vanuatu -
  1. Vital Soksok (1997-1998)
  2. Donald Kalpokas (1998)
  3. Clement Leo (1998-1999)

== Europe ==
- Albania - Paskal Milo (1997-2001)
- Andorra - Albert Pintat (1997-2001)
- Austria - Wolfgang Schüssel (1995-2000)
- Belarus -
  1. Ivan Antanovich (1997-1998)
  2. Ural Latypov (1998-2000)
- Belgium - Erik Derycke (1995-1999)
  - Brussels-Capital Region - Jos Chabert (1989-1999)
  - Flanders - Luc Van den Brande (1992-1999)
  - Wallonia - William Ancion (1996-1999)
- Bosnia and Herzegovina - Jadranko Prlić (1996-2001)
  - Republika Srpska - Aleksa Buha (1992-1998)
- Bulgaria - Nadezhda Mihailova (1997-2001)
- Croatia - Mate Granić (1993-2000)
- Cyprus - Ioannis Kasoulidis (1997-2003)
  - Northern Cyprus -
    1. Taner Etkin (1996-1998)
    2. Tahsin Ertuğruloğlu (1998-2004)
- Czech Republic -
  1. Jaroslav Šedivý (1997-1998)
  2. Jan Kavan (1998-2002)
- Denmark - Niels Helveg Petersen (1993-2000)
- Estonia -
  1. Toomas Hendrik Ilves (1996-1998)
  2. Raul Mälk (1998-1999)
- Finland - Tarja Halonen (1995-2000)
- France - Hubert Védrine (1997-2002)
- Germany -
  1. Klaus Kinkel (1992-1998)
  2. Joschka Fischer (1998-2005)
- Greece - Theodoros Pangalos (1996-1999)
- Hungary -
  1. László Kovács (1994-1998)
  2. János Martonyi (1998-2002)
- Iceland - Halldór Ásgrímsson (1995-2004)
- Ireland - David Andrews (1997-2000)
- Italy - Lamberto Dini (1996-2001)
- Latvia - Valdis Birkavs (1994-1999)
- Liechtenstein - Andrea Willi (1993-2001)
- Lithuania - Algirdas Saudargas (1996-2000)
- Luxembourg - Jacques Poos (1984-1999)
- Republic of Macedonia -
  1. Blagoje Handžiski (1997-1998)
  2. Aleksandar Dimitrov (1998-2000)
- Malta -
  1. George Vella (1996-1998)
  2. Guido de Marco (1998-1999)
- Moldova - Nicolae Tăbăcaru (1997-2000)
- Netherlands -
  1. Hans van Mierlo (1994-1998)
  2. Jozias van Aartsen (1998-2002)
- Norway - Knut Vollebæk (1997-2000)
- Poland - Bronisław Geremek (1997-2000)
- Portugal - Jaime Gama (1995-2002)
- Romania - Andrei Pleşu (1997-1999)
- Russia -
  1. Yevgeny Primakov (1996-1998)
  2. Igor Ivanov (1998-2004)
  - Chechnya -
    1. Movladi Udugo (1997-1998)
    2. Akhyad Idigov (1998-1999)
- San Marino - Gabriele Gatti (1986-2002)
- Slovakia -
  1. Zdenka Kramplová (1997-1998)
  2. Eduard Kukan (1998-2006)
- Slovenia - Boris Frlec (1997-2000)
- Spain - Abel Matutes (1996-2000)
- Sweden -
  1. Lena Hjelm-Wallén (1994-1998)
  2. Anna Lindh (1998-2003)
- Switzerland - Flavio Cotti (1993-1999)
- Ukraine -
  1. Hennadiy Udovenko (1994-1998)
  2. Borys Tarasyuk (1998-2000)
- United Kingdom - Robin Cook (1997-2001)
- Vatican City - Archbishop Jean-Louis Tauran (1990-2003)
- Yugoslavia -
  1. Milan Milutinović (1995-1998)
  2. Živadin Jovanović (1998-2000)
  - Montenegro - Branko Perović (1997-2000)

== North America and the Caribbean ==
- Antigua and Barbuda - Lester Bird (1991-2004)
- The Bahamas - Janet Bostwick (1994-2002)
- Barbados - Billie Miller (1994-2008)
- Belize -
  1. Dean Barrow (1993-1998)
  2. Said Musa (1998-2002)
- Canada - Lloyd Axworthy (1996-2000)
  - Quebec -
    1. Sylvain Simard (1996-1998)
    2. Louise Beaudoin (1998-2003)
- Costa Rica -
  1. Fernando Naranjo Villalobos (1994-1998)
  2. Roberto Rojas López (1998-2002)
- Cuba - Roberto Robaina (1993-1999)
- Dominica -
  1. Edison James (1995-1998)
  2. Norris Charles (1998-2000)
- Dominican Republic - Eduardo Latorre Rodríguez (1996-2000)
- El Salvador - Ramón Ernesto González Giner (1995-1999)
- Grenada -
  1. Raphael Fletcher (1997-1998)
  2. Mark Isaac (1998-1999)
- Guatemala - Eduardo Stein (1996-2000)
- Haiti - Fritz Longchamp (1995-2001)
- Honduras -
  1. Delmer Urbizo Panting (1995-1998)
  2. Fernando Martínez Jiménez (1998-1999)
- Jamaica - Seymour Mullings (1995-2000)
- Mexico -
  1. José Ángel Gurría (1994-1998)
  2. Rosario Green (1998-2000)
- Nicaragua -
  1. Emilio Álvarez Montalván (1997-1998)
  2. Eduardo Montealegre (1998-2000)
- Panama -
  1. Ricardo Alberto Arias (1996-1998)
  2. Jorge Eduardo Ritter (1998-1999)
- Puerto Rico – Norma Burgos (1995–1999)
- Saint Kitts and Nevis - Denzil Douglas (1995-2000)
- Saint Lucia - George Odlum (1997-2001)
- Saint Vincent and the Grenadines -
  1. Alpian Allen (1994-1998)
  2. Allan Cruickshank (1998-2001)
- Trinidad and Tobago - Ralph Maraj (1995-2000)
- United States - Madeleine Albright (1997-2001)

== South America ==
- Argentina - Guido di Tella (1991-1999)
- Bolivia - Javier Murillo de la Rocha (1997-2001)
- Brazil - Luiz Felipe Palmeira Lampreia (1995-2001)
- Chile - José Miguel Insulza (1994-1999)
- Colombia -
  1. María Emma Mejía Vélez (1996-1998)
  2. Camilo Reyes (1998)
  3. Guillermo Fernández de Soto (1998-2002)
- Ecuador - José Ayala Lasso (1997-1999)
- Guyana - Clement Rohee (1992-2001)
- Paraguay -
  1. Rubén Melgarejo Lanzoni (1996-1998)
  2. Dido Florentin Bogado (1998-1999)
- Peru -
  1. Eduardo Ferrero Costa (1997-1998)
  2. Fernando de Trazegnies (1998-2000)
- Suriname - Errol Snijders (1997-2000)
- Uruguay -
  1. Álvaro Ramos Trigo (1995-1998)
  2. Didier Opertti (1998-2005)
- Venezuela - Miguel Ángel Burelli Rivas (1994-1999)
