= Makala Central Prison =

Prison in the Democratic Republic of the Congo

Coordinates: 4°21′45″S 15°17′9″E

- Interactive map of Makala Central Prison
- Location: Kinshasa, Democratic Republic of the Congo
- Status: Operational
- Capacity: 1,500
- Population: 14,000–15,000 (2024)

Notable prisoners
- Stanis Bujakera Tshiamala, Thomas Lubanga Dyilo, Emmanuel Dungia, Bruno Tshibala, Muanda Nsemi

Makala Central Prison (French: Prison centrale de Makala), or Makala Prison (French: Prison de Makala, Lingala: Bolóko ya Makala), is the biggest prison in the Democratic Republic of the Congo (DRC), located in its capital city, Kinshasa. It is located in the city center, 3 miles (4.8 km) from the presidential palace.

Makala Prison is located between the communes of Makala and Selembao. With a theoretical capacity of 1,500 detainees, Makala is the only detention centre in Kinshasa, with the exception of Ndolo military prison.

The security of each of the eleven pavilions where prisoners are housed is ensured by the inmates. There are no police officers or prison guards inside the site. Instead, prisoners armed with batons guard the entrances and exits of each pavilion.

== Capacity ==
Makala Prison has capacity for 1,500 prisoners, and holds both male and female prisoners. However, Makala Prison is highly overcrowded, housing between 14,000 and 15,000 inmates. According to activists, this leads to inmates often starving to death. In 2020, it was estimated that more than 90% of the people held at the prison were awaiting trial, and only 6% were actually serving sentences.

== History ==
Makala Prison was created in 1957 during the rule of the Belgian Congo. There was a jailbreak in 2017, and an attempted jailbreak in 2024. Thousands escaped and dozens died in the 2017 incident, while over a hundred died and none escaped in the 2024 incident. Jailbreaks are relatively common in the DRC.
