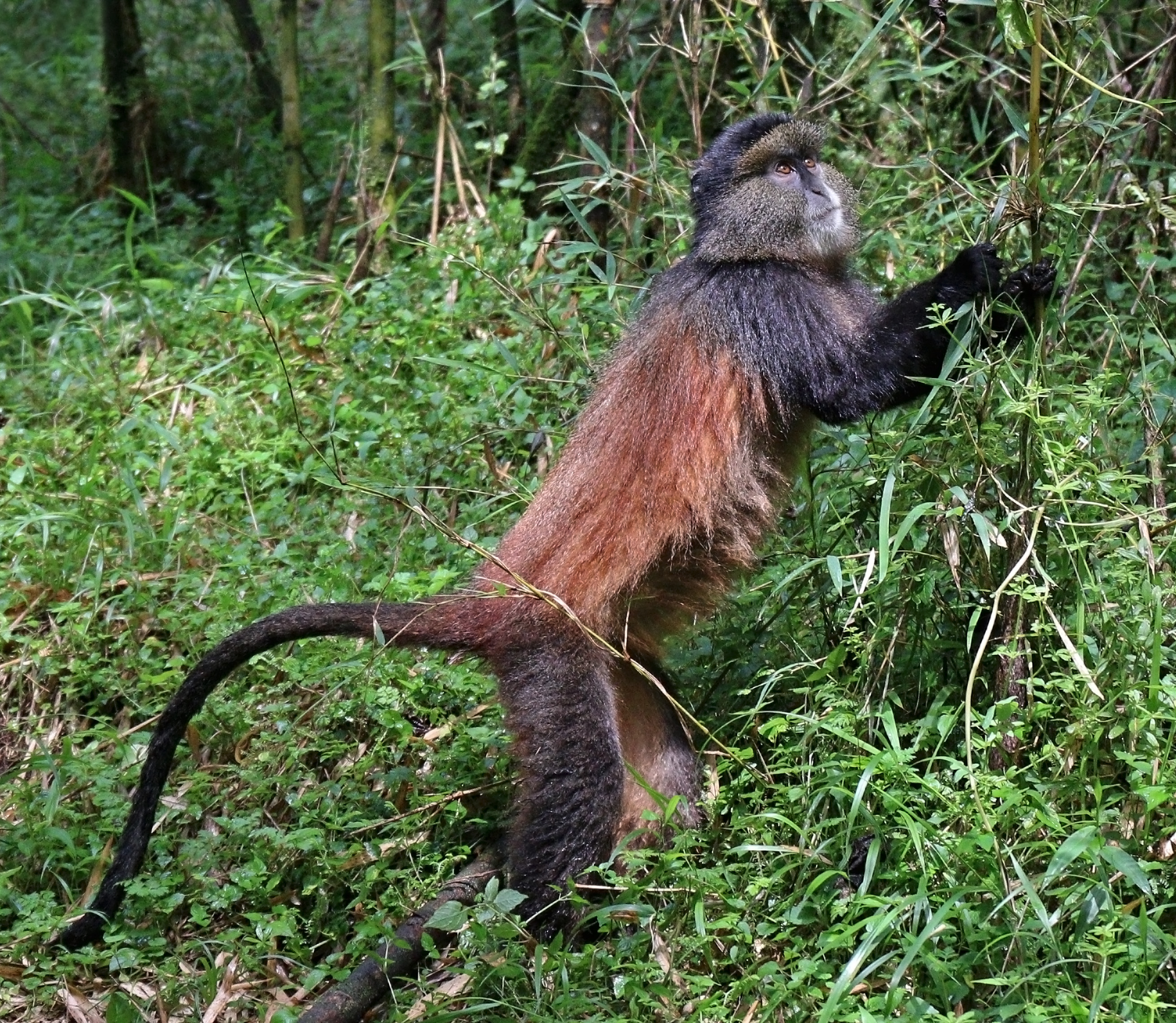
- Volcanoes National Park, Rwanda

Conservation status
- Endangered (IUCN 3.1)

Scientific classification
- Kingdom: Animalia
- Phylum: Chordata
- Class: Mammalia
- Order: Primates
- Family: Cercopithecidae
- Genus: Cercopithecus
- Species: C. mitis
- Subspecies: C. m. kandti

Trinomial name
- Cercopithecus mitis kandti Matschie, 1905

= Golden monkey =

Subspecies of Old World monkey

The golden monkey (Cercopithecus mitis kandti) is a subspecies of the blue monkey. It is an Old World monkey found in the Virunga volcanic mountains of Central Africa, including four national parks: Mgahinga, in south-west Uganda; Volcanoes, in north-west Rwanda; and Virunga and Kahuzi-Biéga, in the eastern Democratic Republic of Congo. It is restricted to highland forest, especially near bamboo.

This species is similar to the blue monkey overall, but the golden monkey has golden-orange upper flanks and back.

Not much is known about the golden monkey's behaviour. It lives in social groups of up to 30 individuals. Its diet consists mainly of bamboo, leaves, and fruit, though it also is thought to eat insects.

Due to the gradual destruction of its habitat and recent wars in its limited habitat, the golden monkey is listed as endangered on the IUCN Red List.

== Distribution and habitat ==
Due to their diet, golden monkeys prefer a habitat with abundant fruit and bamboo. They move between areas depending on the season. When ripe fruit is available, they remain in those areas. At the beginning of the rainy season, bamboo shoots grow quickly and the golden monkeys move to such habitats. If an area contains both mixed fruit and bamboo, golden monkeys tend to frequent that area more than areas consisting of only bamboo. Golden monkeys are most frequently seen in bamboo forests, suggesting that the species prefers this habitat. The Virunga volcanic mountains have contrasting areas that have different food densities, to which the golden monkeys are capable of adjusting their diets. In the Virunga Massif, they have folivorous diets that include bamboo shoots, but in the Gishwati forest, golden monkeys are frugivorous, consuming primarily fruits and shrub leaves.

== Behavior and ecology ==
Golden monkey usually travel in groups ranging from three to 62 monkeys. Groups found at higher elevations tend to be smaller. They often return to one of several different sleeping areas after a day of feeding and often sleep in small subgroups of four, at the top of bamboo plants. They also often use a dense bamboo plant or a combination of several bamboo plants that weave together to make a foundation for sleep. They often feed near the sleeping area and then return to this same sleeping location day after day.

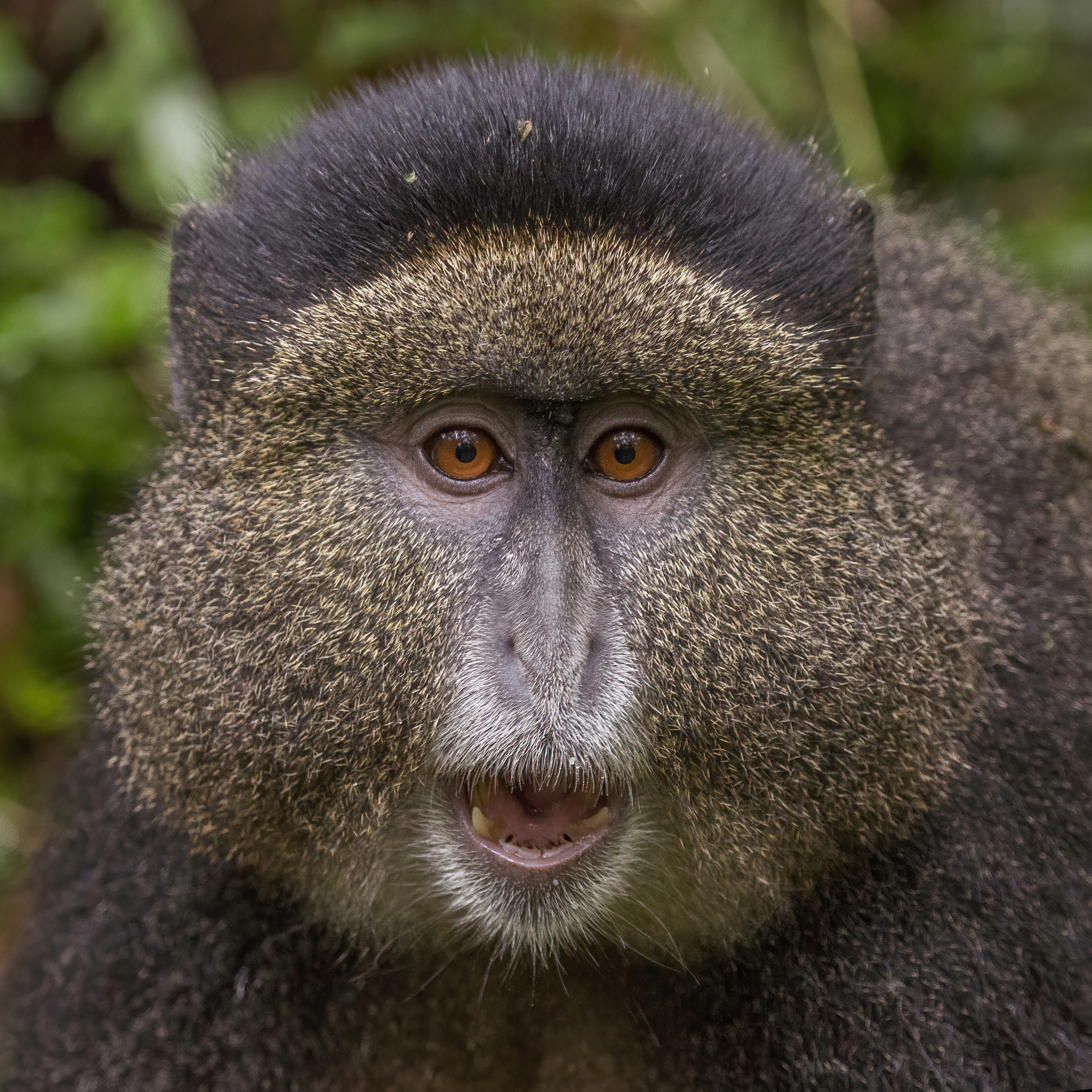
Portrait

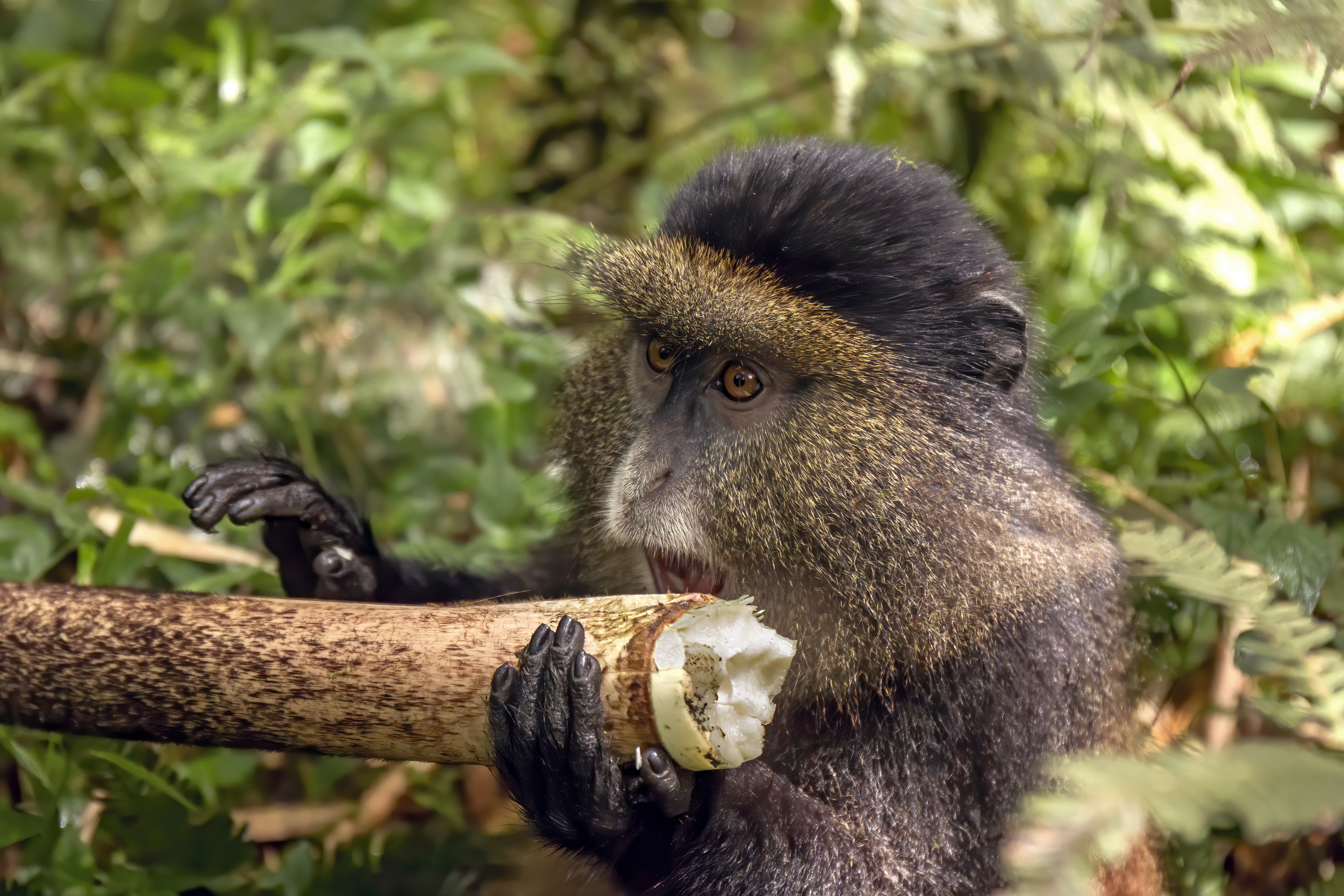
Eating bamboo

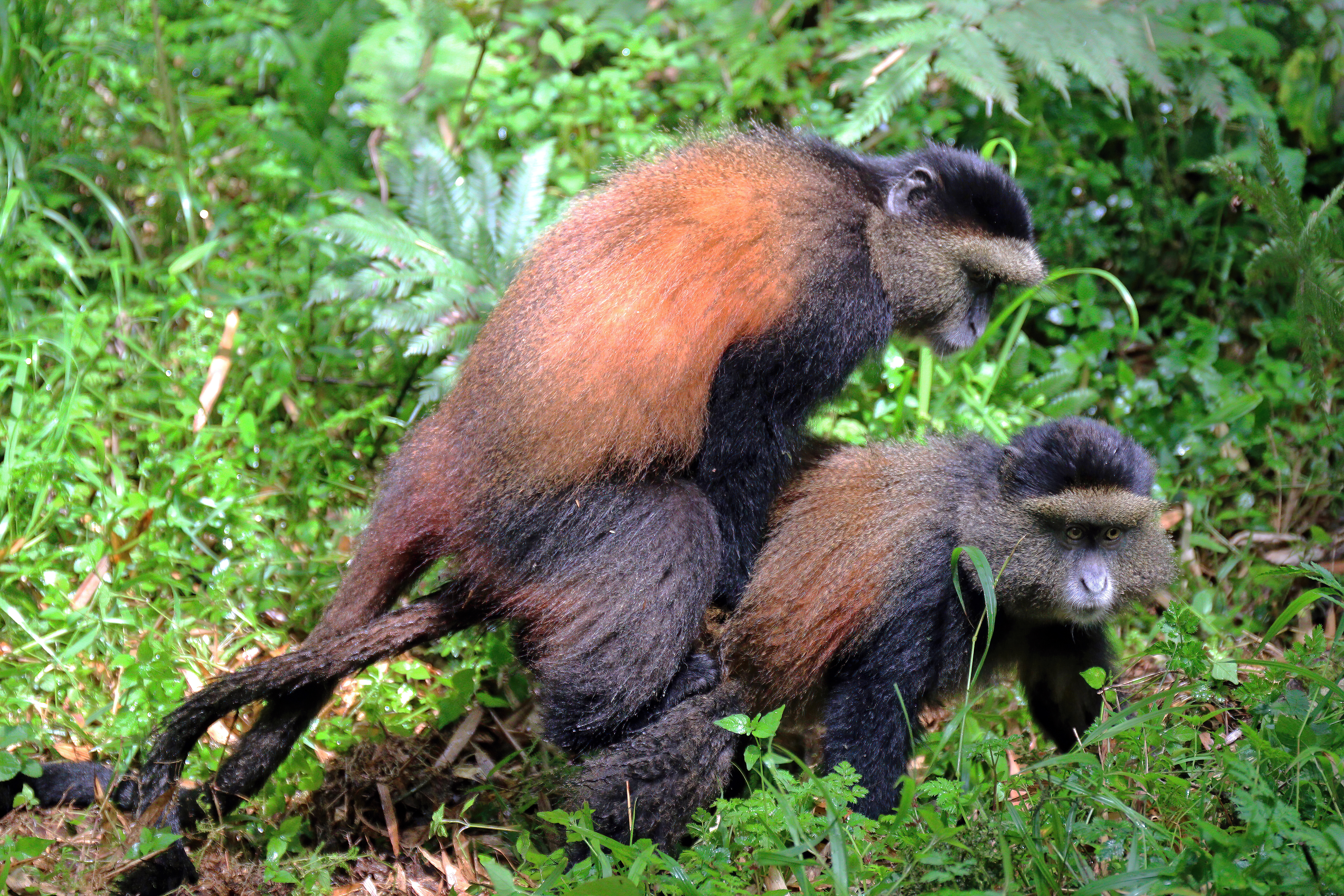
Mating

=== Diet ===
The golden monkey diet consists primarily of young bamboo leaves, fruits, bamboo branchlets, bamboo shoots, invertebrates, flowers, and shrub leaves, but is an opportunistic feeder, and the availability of fruit can easily influence its diet. During seasons when ripe fruit is available, the golden monkey tends to feed more on fruit. The golden monkey may also feed on various flowers and shrubs when they are available. The most frequently eaten invertebrates are the pupae of lepidopteran larvae picked from leaves. Bamboo tends to be the most frequently eaten because it is often more available year-round.

== Conservation ==
The golden monkey is listed as endangered on the IUCN Red List. Certain activities may threaten the conservation of the golden monkey. Illegal activities that harm ecosystems, such as tree extraction and bamboo removal, pose serious threats; tree removal poses the more serious risk.
