= Land Forces of the Democratic Republic of the Congo =

Branch of the Armed Forces of DR Congo

- Forces Terrestres
- Founded: 1961; 2003 (current form)
- Country: Democratic Republic of the Congo
- Branch: Army
- Role: Land warfare
- Size: 103,000 troops (2024)
- Headquarters: Kinshasa
- Colors: Blue, red
- Engagements: First Congo War; Second Congo War; Katanga insurgency; Ituri conflict; ADF insurgency; LRA insurgency; Dongo conflict; Kamwina Nsapu rebellion; Kivu conflict / DRC–Rwanda conflict; First M23 rebellion; Second M23 rebellion; Western DR Congo clashes

Commanders
- Chief of staff of the land forces: Maj. Gen. Christian Ndaywel

The Land Forces (French: Forces Terrestres), also called the Congolese army, are the land warfare component and the largest branch of the Armed Forces of the Democratic Republic of the Congo (FARDC).

The current Congolese army has its origins in the Force Publique that was active in the Belgian Congo, which was renamed the Congolese National Army (Armée nationale congolaise, ANC) when the country gained independence from Belgium in 1960. During the regime of Mobutu Sese Seko, it was renamed the Armed Forces of Zaire (Forces Armées Zaïroises, FAZ) in 1971 with the country's name change from Congo to Zaire. Under Mobutu's leadership the FAZ was used to put down various rebellions but was deliberately kept weak to prevent any possible coup, resulting in its collapse in the face of Laurent Kabila's AFDL rebel movement during the First Congo War (1996–1997). After Kabila's overthrow of Mobutu the former FAZ troops and various rebels that supported him were in no condition to fight the invasion by Rwandan-backed militant groups during the Second Congo War (1998–2003) and largely collapsed.

The peace agreement signed in 2002 initiated the process of uniting former rebel groups and the previous government forces into a national army, the Land Forces of the FARDC. Several waves of integration have turned the Land Forces into a collection of unprofessional and poorly organized former rebels. The army continues to have rampant corruption, indiscipline, and low and infrequent pay, which has led to troops committing numerous crimes against civilians. In 2009, a long-term reform plan was adopted for the creation of a smaller, professional, and modernized force, but it was abandoned in 2015. During the integration and reform process, the army remained engaged with dozens of armed groups throughout the country, most notably in the eastern province of North Kivu, near the border with Rwanda. Since the resurgence of M23 in 2022, the army has also had border clashes with the Rwandan Defence Force.

== History ==
=== First army integration ===
The land forces were made up of about 14-18 integrated brigades, of fighters from all the former warring factions which have gone through an brassage integration process (see next paragraph), and a not-publicly known number of non-integrated brigades which remained solely made up from single factions (the Congolese Rally for Democracy (RCD)'s Armee National Congolaise, the ex-government former Congolese Armed Forces (FAC), the ex-RCD KML, the ex-Movement for the Liberation of Congo, the armed groups of the Ituri conflict (the Mouvement des Révolutionnaires Congolais (MRC), Forces de Résistance Patriotique d'Ituri (FRPI) and the Front Nationaliste Intégrationniste (FNI)) and the Mai-Mai).

In August 2003, in accordance with the power-sharing deals that ended the Second Congo War, leaders were appointed for the new unified Armed Forces of the Democratic Republic of the Congo (FARDC), and General Sylvain Buki, the former military commander of the RCD, became chief of staff of the land forces. Belgium convened a series of conferences with military officers from November 2003 to January 2004, where it was decided to create a national army as a merger of former belligerents, instead of as a professional force. It appears that about the same time that Presidential Decree 03/042 of 18 December 2003 established the National Commission for Demobilisation and Reinsertion (CONADER), '..all ex-combatants were officially declared as FARDC soldiers and the then FARDC brigades [were to] rest deployed until the order to leave for brassage. Foreign donors were reluctant to train former rebels, but some of them believed that insecurity in the DRC prevented all other political or economic development. During 2005 the security sector reform received additional support.

The reform plan adopted in 2005 envisaged the formation of eighteen integrated brigades through the brassage process as its first of three stages. The process consists firstly of regroupment, where fighters are disarmed. Then they are sent to orientation centres, run by CONADER, where fighters take the choice of either returning to civilian society or remaining in the armed forces. Combatants who choose demobilization receive an initial cash payment of US $110. Those who choose to stay within the FARDC are then transferred to one of six integration centres for a 45-day training course, which aims to build integrated formations out of factional fighters previously heavily divided along ethnic, political and regional lines. The centres are spread out around the country at Kitona, Kamina, Kisangani, Rumangabo and Nyaleke (within the Virunga National Park) in Nord-Kivu, and Luberizi (on the border with Burundi) in South Kivu. The process has suffered severe difficulties due to construction delays, administration errors, and the amount of travel former combatants have to do, as the three stages' centres are widely separated.

The training of the first three brigades was conducted by Belgium, Angola, and South Africa. The first step was to end loyalties to previous armed groups and to build up the allegiance to the Congolese state. The foreign personnel also instructed Congolese trainers to accelerate the training process, improved living conditions, and provided equipment. Following the first eighteen integrated brigades, the second goal is the formation of a ready reaction force of two to three brigades, and finally, by 2010 when MONUC is anticipated to have withdrawn, the creation of a Main Defence Force of three divisions.

In February 2008, the current reform plan was described as:

"The short term, 2008–2010, will see the setting in place of a Rapid Reaction Force; the medium term, 2008–2015, with a Covering Force; and finally the long term, 2015–2020, with a Principal Defence Force." He added that the reform plan rests on a programme of synergy based on the four pillars of dissuasion, production, reconstruction and excellence. "The Rapid Reaction Force is expected to focus on dissuasion, through a Rapid Reaction Force of 12 battalions, capable of aiding MONUC to secure the east of the country and to realise constitutional missions," Defence Minister Chikez Diemu said.

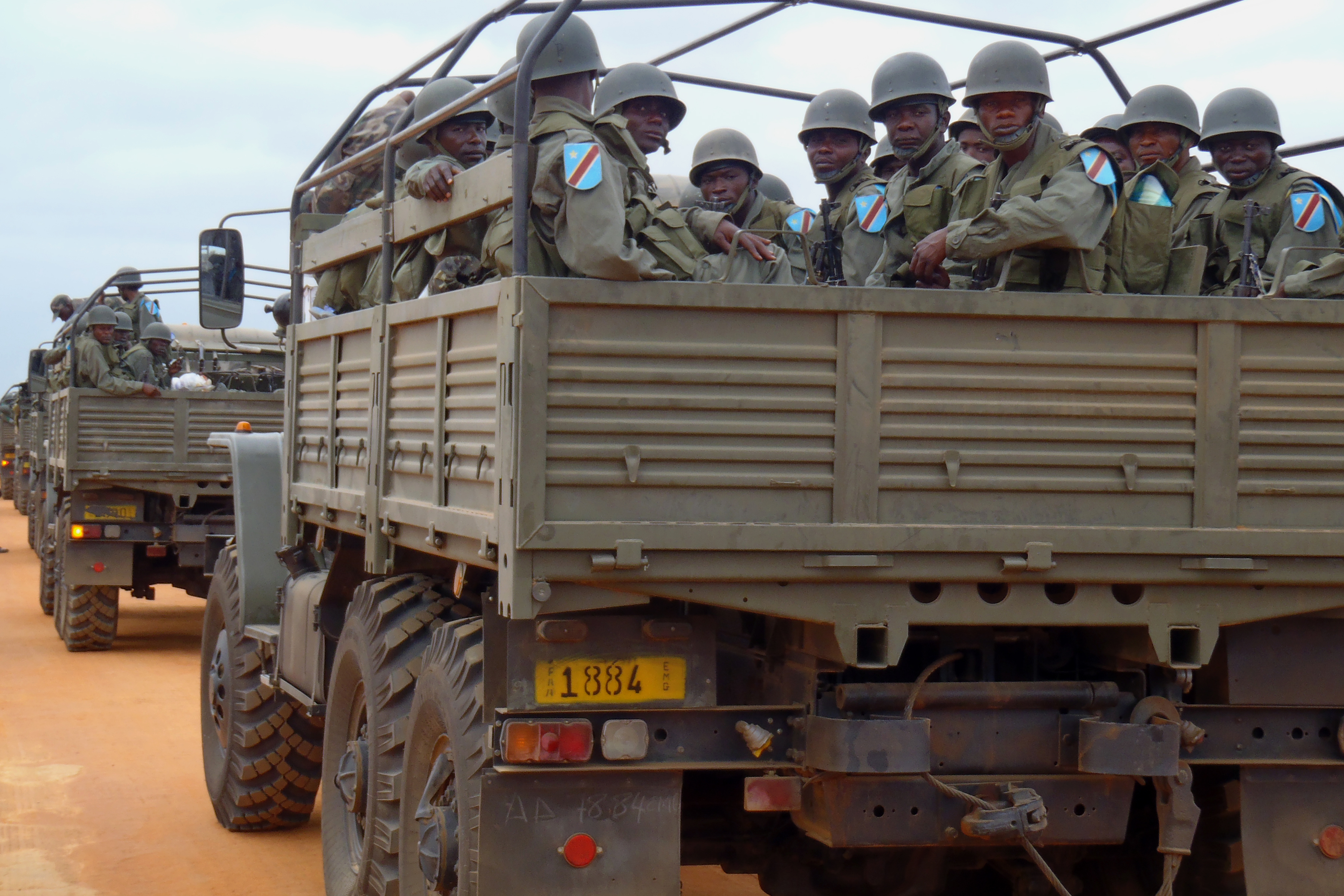
Congolese troops in Ural-4320 trucks at the Kwanza-2010 exercises in Angola.

There was disagreement between the Congolese leaders, who wanted a large integrated army of 100,000 to 125,000 soldiers, and their foreign partners who believed a smaller, more professional, and better-paid force of 60,000 to 70,000 would be more effective. The latter was adopted in the strategic plan for army reform that was passed by President Joseph Kabila in May 2009. Advisors from the European Union's mission, EUSEC RD Congo, were appointed to Congolese institutions (including the defense ministry, the FARDC general staff, the army headquarters, CONADER, and the joint operations center) to coordinate the foreign assistance for the army integration and the demobilization of combatants. President Kabila made a formal request for assistance on 26 April 2005 to Javier Solana, the head of the EU Common Security and Defence Policy, and EUSEC was launched in June 2005.

Amid the other difficulties in building new armed forces for the DRC, in early 2007 the integration and training process was distorted as the DRC government under Kabila attempted to use it to gain more control over the dissident general Laurent Nkunda. A hastily negotiated verbal agreement in Rwanda saw three government FAC brigades integrated with Nkunda's former ANC 81st and 83rd Brigades in what was called mixage. Mixage brought multiple factions into composite brigades, but without the 45-day retraining provided by brassage, and it seems that actually, the process was limited to exchanging battalions between the FAC and Nkunda brigades in North Kivu, without further integration. Due to Nkunda's troops having greater cohesion, Nkunda effectively gained control of all five brigades - not what the DRC central government had been hoping! However, after Nkunda used the mixage brigades to fight the FDLR, strains arose between the FARDC and Nkunda-loyalist troops within the brigades and they fell apart in the last days of August 2007. The International Crisis Group says that 'by 30 August [2007] Nkunda's troops had left the mixed brigades and controlled a large part of the Masisi and Rutshuru territories' (of North Kivu).

Both formally integrated brigades and the non-integrated units continue to conduct arbitrary arrests, rapes, robbery, and other crimes and these human rights violations are "regularly" committed by both officers and members of the rank and file. Members of the Army also often strike deals to gain access to resources with the militias they are meant to be fighting.

Corruption in the army was described as "wide-ranging". It was common for commanders to inflate their units with 'ghost soldiers' to pocket the extra money from their pay, and in 2006 it was estimated that half of the US$8 million that the government spent every month on paying soldiers was being stolen. Also because of embezzlement, soldiers were paid infrequently and often received less than their official pay of $10 per month.

As of 2006–07, the Land Forces of the FARDC had a central staff of 1,500–2,500 personnel, 14 integrated brigades with 43,800–49,000 personnel, and 64,300 non-integrated personnel in the military regions, for a total of around 110,000. The various brigades and other formations and units numbered at least 100,000 troops. The status of these brigades has been described as "pretty chaotic." A 2007 disarmament and repatriation study said "army units that have not yet gone through the process of brassage are usually much smaller than what they ought to be. Some non-integrated brigades have only 500 men (and are thus nothing more than a small battalion) whereas some battalions may not even have the size of a normal company (over 100 men)." Integrated brigades had a strength of up to 5,000.

=== Ongoing conflicts ===
==== Instability in Eastern Congo ====
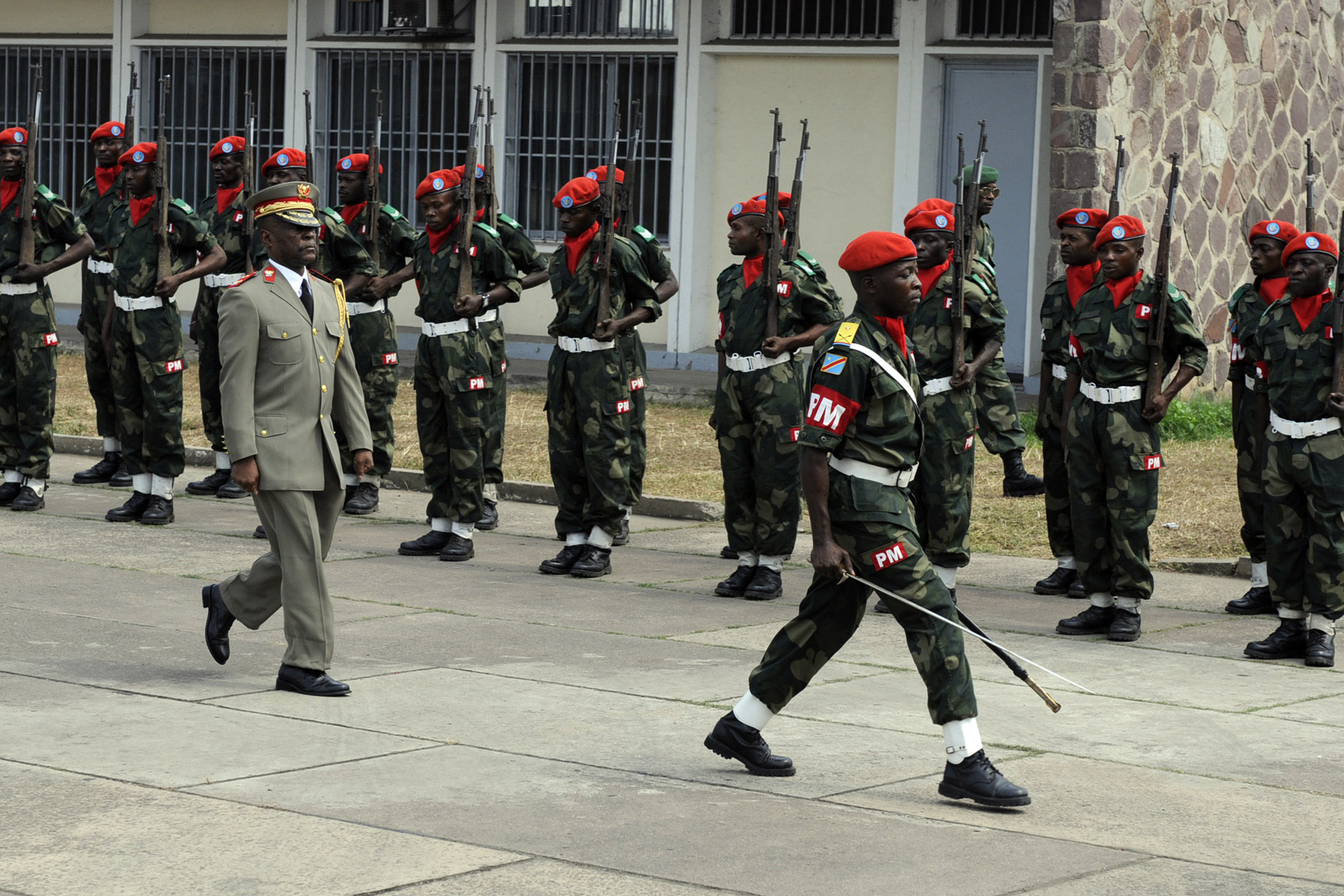
A military police battalion during the opening of a DRC–US training exercise, Command and Staff College, Kinshasa, 6 September 2010.

The Congolese army faced the task of continuing integration while also fighting armed groups in the east. After the first integrated brigade of the new Congolese army completed its training under Belgian supervision in Kisangani, in mid-2004, it began its deployment to the Ituri District of Orientale Province for peacekeeping during the Ituri conflict. The first battalion arrived in Bunia, Ituri, in 2004, and the brigade's other two battalions were deployed there in April 2005 to protect civilians from two local militias, the Nationalist and Integrationist Front (FNI) and the Union of Congolese Patriots (UPC). On 20 April 2005 the 1st Integrated Brigade carried out a "search and cordon" operation with MONUC that destroyed several militia camps. As of June 2005, the 2nd Integrated Brigade had also been deployed to Ituri, and as of March 2006 there were reportedly six brigades in Ituri. From 2005 to 2006 the army and MONUC conducted joint operations against militias, which started working together against them, before the security situation improved in late 2006, when the militia leaders were either arrested or integrated into the army.

Despite the integration at the higher levels, the rivalry between Kabila and RCD-Goma caused all factions to resist army integration. Each of them remained suspicious of others tried to maintain control of its forces within the army. This created a volatile situation that contributed to continuing fighting in the Kivu region. In 2004, when an FAC general who was assigned as the South Kivu regional military commander attempted to arrest several RCD officers, it caused a mutiny among the group. Three non-integrated brigades, two from the FAC and one from the MLC, were deployed by the transitional government, and they retook Bukavu, but the fighting continued and spread to North Kivu. In June 2005, the 3rd Integrated Brigade of the FARDC completed its training under Belgian and South African personnel, and was deployed to South Kivu, where the Hutu Democratic Forces for the Liberation of Rwanda (FDLR) militia was also active. It was reported in 2005 that Congolese soldiers in the Kivus were too "afraid of the FDLR" to attack it, and were bribed by the group to allow it to raid the population that they were supposed to be protecting.

In October 2005 the army sent 2,000 troops to northern Orientale Province, near the Sudanese border, to disarm the Ugandan Lord's Resistance Army insurgency, when the group entered the DRC. In November 2005 the army's 6th military region, in Katanga Province, began an operation in northern and central Katanga, where a dozen Mai-Mai militia groups were attacking villages, and the violence escalated to a similar level as in Ituri and the Kivus. The initial operation was not successful in disarming the militias. During these conflicts, the International Crisis Group wrote in February 2006 that "Recent events in the east ... indicate that on the eve of [the 2006] elections, the integrated Congolese army has yet to develop into a match for determined and well-armed groups." In May 2006 the leading warlord in Katanga, Gédéon Kyungu, surrendered himself to UN peacekeepers, and the Congolese military announced that it was "the end" of the Katangan Mai-Mai. In November 2007, the government declared that Ituri was mostly free of militias, except a few holdouts of the Front for Patriotic Resistance in Ituri (FPRI).

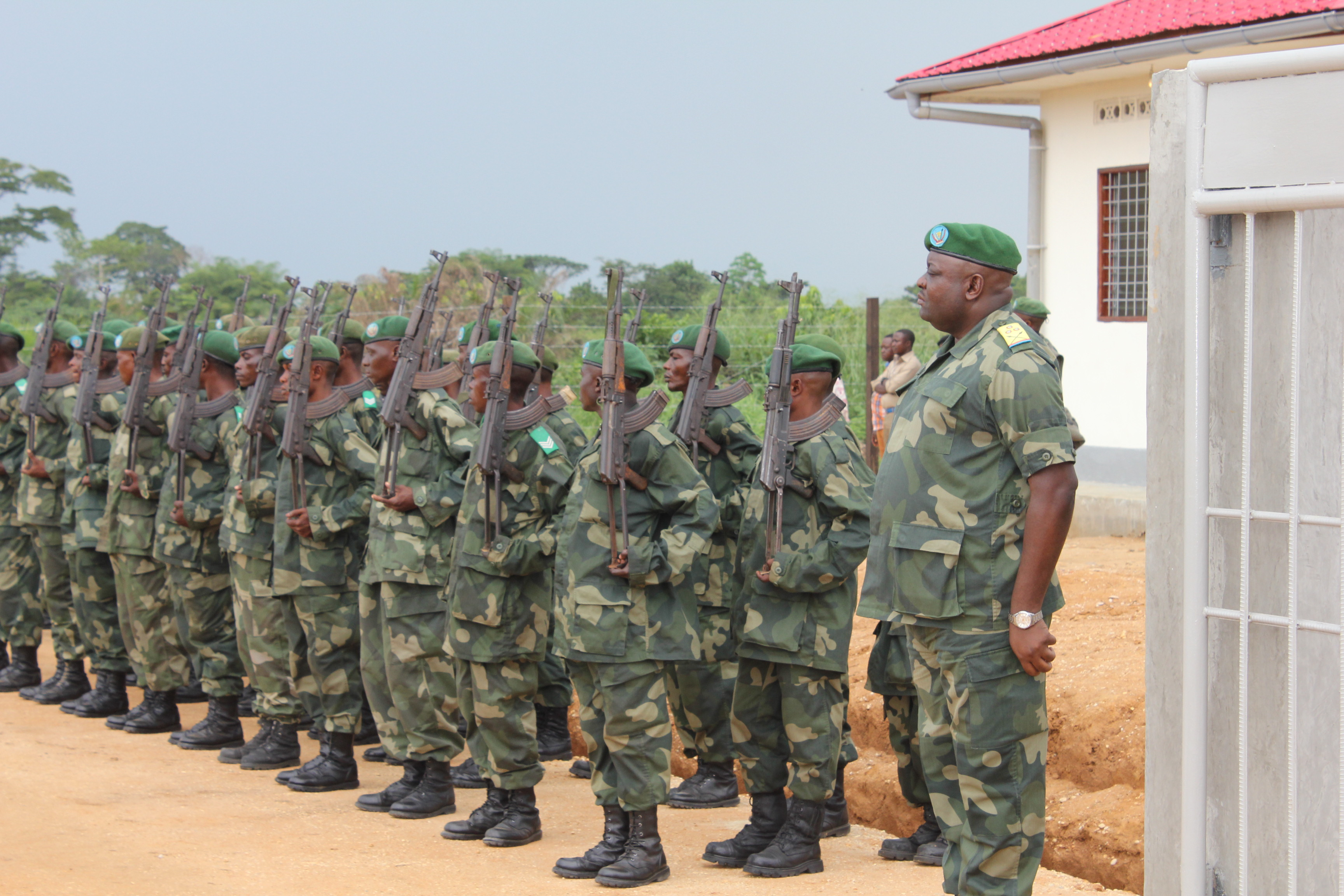
Troops assembled during a visit to the Kisangani ammunition depot by MONUSCO personnel, 10 October 2013.

Some officers from armed groups who felt that they had not received what they wanted from the government started rebellions to use as leverage. With the army still having limited cohesion and capacity, the government attempted to co-opt them. The Tutsi former RCD officer Laurent Nkunda formed a group of hardliners in 2003, and took several ex-RCD brigades with them. There was fighting in 2004 between them and the government, but it was stopped with international pressure. The dispute over army integration remained unresolved, but there was relative calm from 2004 to 2006. General Gabriel Amisi Kumba, an ex-RCD officer who became the land forces chief of staff in 2006, kept the insurgents on the army payroll as appeasement. However, fighting broke out in 2006, and Nkunda established the National Congress for the Defence of the People (CNDP). With Rwandan backing it became one of the most powerful armed groups in the country. The army launched offensives against it in 2006, and provided weapons to ethnic militias for assistance, which increased instability in the region.

The brassage (army integration) process was formally complete by early 2008, and the focus shifted to building a rapid reaction force. But in 2008 many integrated brigades were reshuffled during fighting in the east against Nkunda's CNDP, and some collapsed. The army's operations were unsuccessful and lead to an increase in armed groups in the east. In late 2008, Kabila negotiated with Rwanda, which ultimately led to the arrest of Nkunda in January 2009, and a peace agreement on 23 March 2009 that called for the CNDP to become a political party, and its troops to be integrated with the army. The majority of the CNDP rebels became part of the army under "accelerated integration," without being included in the central biometric database of soldiers. Money allocated to pay the salaries of soldiers in integrated brigades was redirected to the former rebels, creating resentment among the 'loyalists'. The former rebels were also given some privileges, including control over resources, their own parallel command structure, and leadership of operational commands and brigades in the east.

As part of the agreement, the Congolese army fought several operations against the ethnic Hutu FDLR militia and other groups between 2009 and 2011, including Umoja Wetu ("Our Unity") I and II, Kimia ("Silence") II, and Amani Leo ("Peace Today"). The operations were partially successful in weakening the FDLR, but caused a lot of harm to civilians, including the displacement of over a million people. This increased unrest, and along with resentment for the dominance of the former CNDP in the region, led to the rise of other armed groups, including the PARECO faction and the Alliance of Patriots for a Free and Sovereign Congo (APCLS). As of 2010 there were believed to be eighteen integrated brigades, including one mechanized, and two commando regiments. Additional army reorganizations followed to integrate various armed groups, and in 2011 all of the brigades deployed in North and South Kivu were reformed into 27 regiments. The restructuring was an attempt to dismantle units that were heavily influenced by the CNDP. The national demobilization, disarmament, and reintegration (DDR) program for combatants of armed groups, beginning in November 2004, officially ended in September 2011.

==== M23 and other rebellions ====
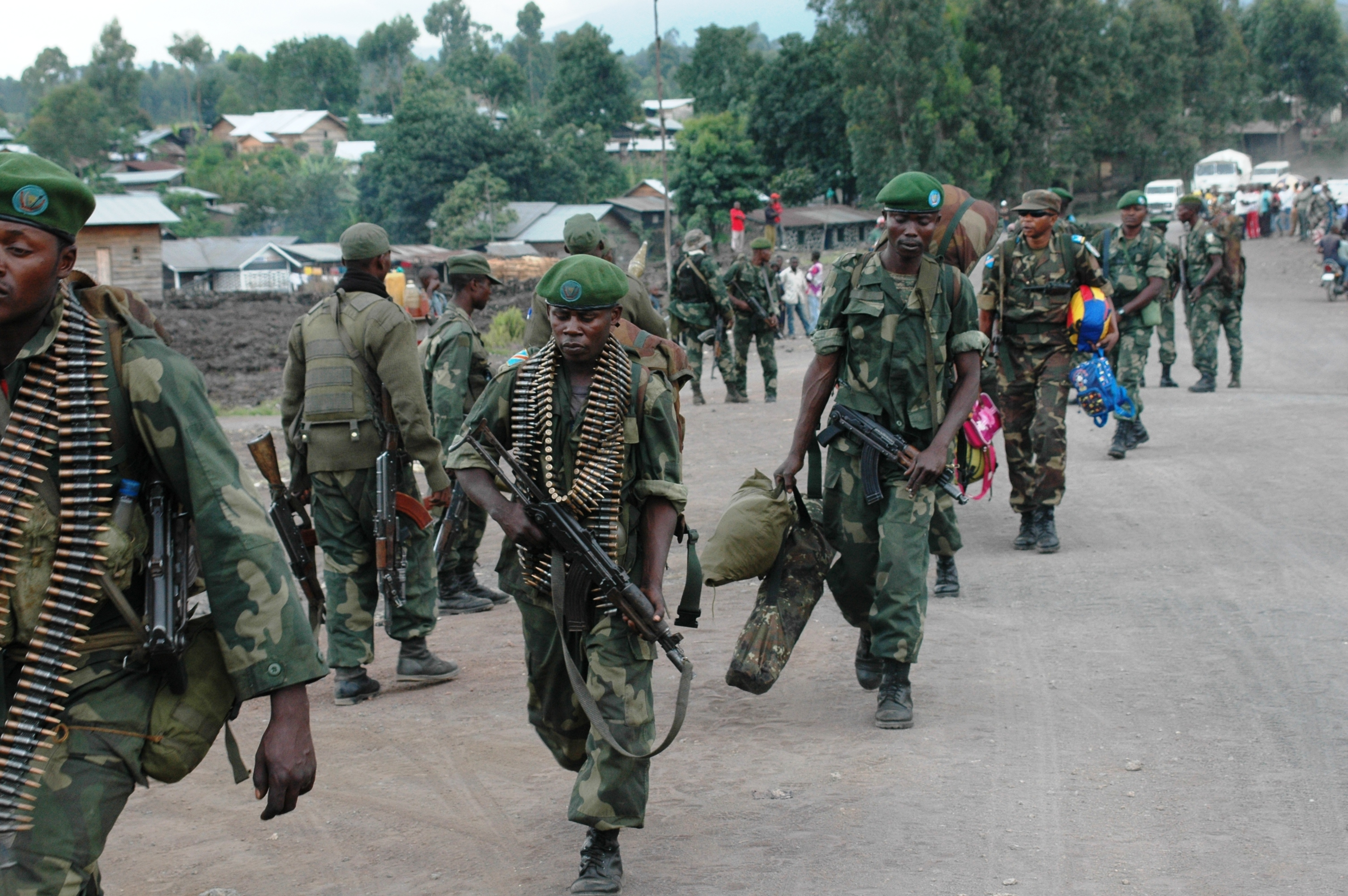
The FARDC reinforcing its positions near Goma in May 2013 during the M23 rebellion.

In early 2012, the 23 March 2009 agreement between the government and the CNDP broke down over the army's attempt to redeploy them from the Kivus to another part of the country, and President Joseph Kabila trying to arrest one of their leaders who was wanted by the International Criminal Court. This led to the rebellion of the March 23 movement by half of the former group. During the disastrous November 2012 campaign that led to the M23's brief capture of Goma, troops often found themselves at the front without supplies, food, or equipment, and the foreign-trained commando battalions received counterproductive orders. After government troops retreated, Gabriel Amisi was replaced as land forces chief of staff by François Olenga. The officers Lucien Bahuma and Mamadou Ndala took command of the troops at the front. Criticism of the UN peacekeepers for not preventing the capture of Goma led the UN Security Council to pass Resolution 2098, which authorized a Force Intervention Brigade to fight against rebels. In August 2013 a Congolese army offensive supported by the Force Intervention Brigade had some success against M23 in the Goma area. In November 2013, the last M23 positions were taken by the army, and the group agreed to disarm, while some survivors escaped across the border.

The poor performance against M23 can be explained, in part, by the successive army integration programs undermining unit cohesion. Several of the integrated brigades organized between 2004 and 2008 were successful in ending loyalty to previous groups, but more recent integration was often done without proper training or enough attention to the composition of new brigades, some of which almost entirely consisted of one former rebel group. There are also lingering ethnic tensions, with discrimination towards Tutsi in particular, and a divide between the former rebels, Mai-Mai militia members, and the "ex-government troops"―veterans of Mobutu's Forces Armées Zaïroises (FAZ) and Kabila's Forces Armées Congolaises (FAC). The latter are better trained, but sometimes are subordinated to much less qualified rebels because of power-sharing arrangements as part of the integration process. Furthermore, only regimental and brigade commanders have satellite phones and two-way radios, so officers at lower levels can only communicate using messengers. Many of the areas where troops are stationed have very limited transport or communications infrastructure.

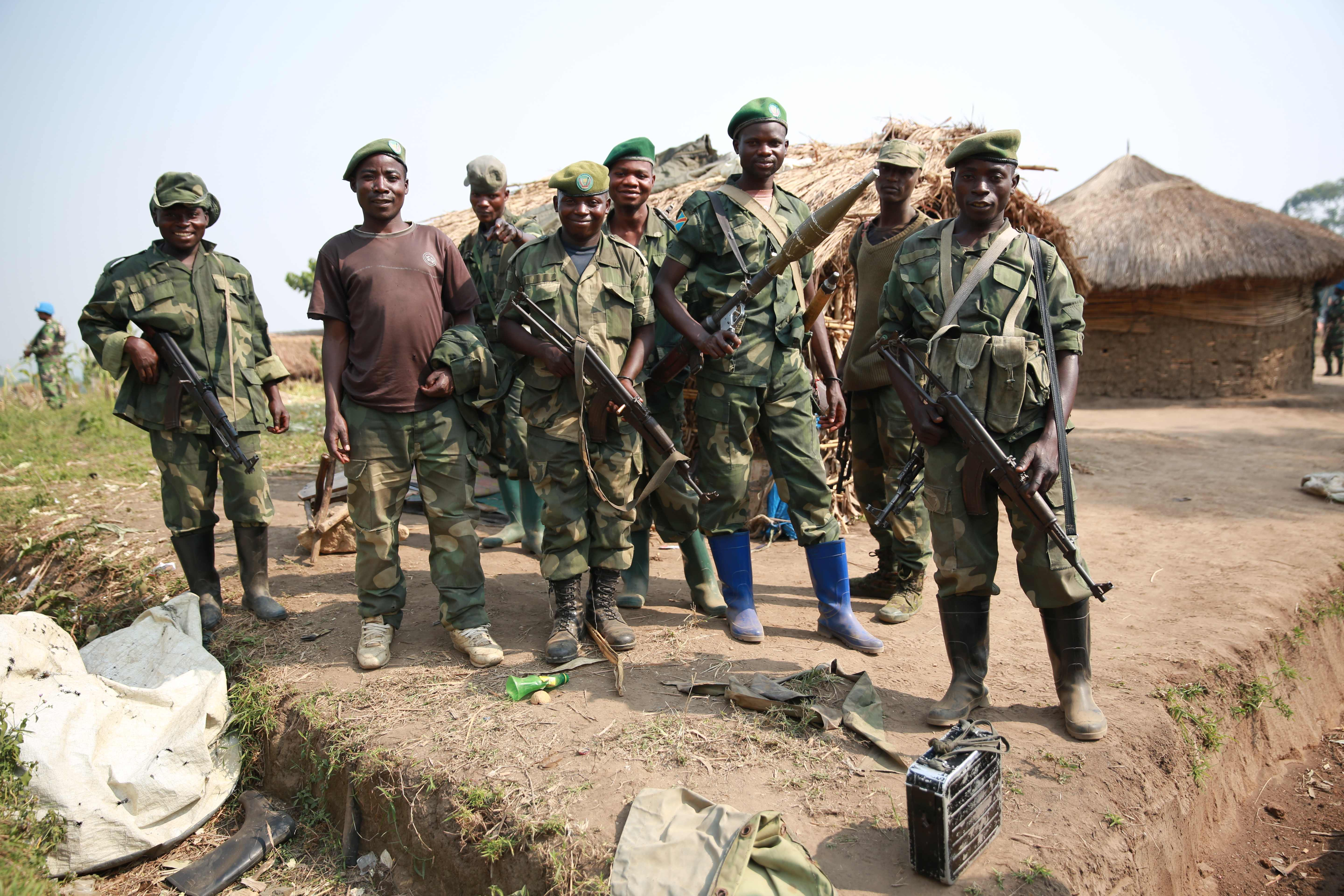
Soldiers during a FARDC–MONUSCO operation in Ituri in January 2015.

The victory against M23 in November 2013 and changes to leadership led to some increase in confidence in the army. However, it remained a patchwork of various rebel groups created by several waves of integration. The reformist officers Lucien Bahuma and Mamadou Ndala, who had a significant role in the victory over M23, both died in 2014 (Ndala was murdered by other soldiers). During a September 2014 restructuring, Amisi and several other officers with a record of ineffectiveness, corruption, or human rights abuses were brought back. Dieudonné Banze, the Republican Guard commander, was appointed as land forces chief of staff in a series of appointments that were interpreted as President Joseph Kabila preparing for upcoming elections scheduled for 2016. Extensive training and other assistance provided by foreign countries also did not lead to an overall improvement in the army's performance, which continued to have chronic incompetence and indiscipline. According to a May 2014 report, Congolese soldiers still regularly committed crimes, including those in foreign-trained units.

After M23's defeat, there were still over fifty armed groups in the east posing a security threat, ranging from military-like formations such as the Allied Democratic Forces (ADF) or the FDLR, to small bands of a dozen fighters. The Mai-Mai Kata Katanga, which occupied Lubumbashi for a few hours in 2013 before being expelled from the city, along with smaller Katangan secessionist groups remains active in the region of Katanga. In July 2014, border skirmishes took places between the Congolese army and the Rwandan Defence Force (RDF). In May 2015, three hundred special forces troops were deployed in northern Katanga to prevent inter-ethnic violence between Mbuti and Bantu locals. In the summer of 2016, government forces killed a local leader in the Kasaï Province, historically a stronghold of the political opposition to Kabila, which led to the outbreak of the Kamwina Nsapu rebellion in November 2016. From 2015 to 2017, there was an upsurge of attacks in the ADF insurgency in Ituri and North Kivu, which targeted Congolese army and MONUSCO bases. In 2020, Isidore Kahungu was replaced as land forces chief of staff by President Félix Tshisekedi with Sikabwe Fall Asinda, who was previously commander of the Sukola I operation against the ADF, which led MONUSCO to suspend cooperation with the FARDC in 2015 because of allegations against him of serious human rights abuses.

==== Resurgence of M23 since 2021 ====
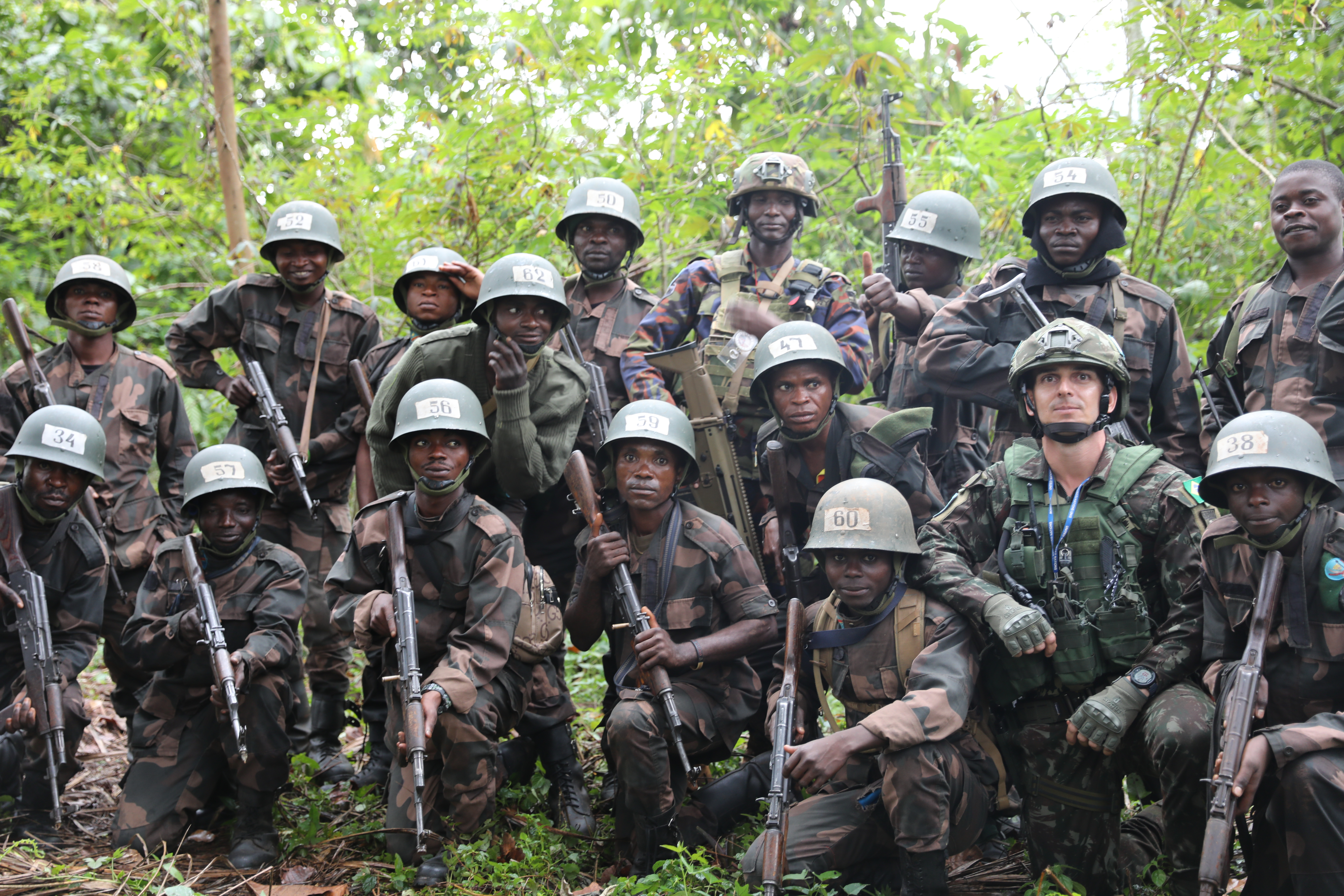
FARDC soldiers after a MONUSCO training exercise in North Kivu, April 2025.

In 2022 President Félix Tshisekedi initiated some reforms to the armed forces and a recruitment drive. However, the original army restructuring plan, adopted in 2009 and scheduled to be completed in 2025, was abandoned in 2015, and no substantial army reforms have been made since then. The army still has long-standing logistical and structural problems. It is poorly organized, with battalions and regiments not being rotated from the front for rest and retraining, and experiencing high attrition and shortages of equipment. There is also no clear command and control (leading soldiers to fight almost as individuals), minimal planning by officers, and a rigid command style that encourages passivity. There is also very little logistical support, and "the Congolese soldier remains generally malnourished, poorly paid, and poorly equipped." The army has demoralization and desertion, a lack of training and discipline, and frequently changing leadership. Although some Congolese units have put up strong resistance, such as in December 2024 against M23 and the RDF in Lubero, or in November 2012 in Goma, the well-trained infantry battalions are not utilized properly.

Since the resurgence of M23 from 2021 with the support of Rwanda, the government started arming ill-disciplined Wazalendo ("Patriots") pro-government militias. The army reportedly has no control over them. As of 2024, the land forces are reported to consist of four commando battalions, four rapid reaction brigades, three jungle infantry regiments, one artillery regiment, one MP battalion, and over 40 infantry regiments, with a total of 103,000 troops. Many of these units are believed to not be combat-effective. In December 2024 Tshisekedi appointed Major General Christian Ndaywel, the former FARDC deputy chief of staff for intelligence, as the head of the land forces. During the M23's advance on Goma and Bukavu in early 2025, the regular land forces suffered another defeat—despite support from the UN, foreign troops, and foreign mercenaries.

== Organization ==
=== Original structure ===
See also U.S. State Department, 07KINSHASA452 Congolese Military Proposes Redeployment, Renaming Of Integrated Brigades, 19 April 2007. Like the Force Publique in the Congo Free State, FARDC brigades have been deploying to their areas of operation with their families in tow. 2nd Commando Battalion of the Belgian Paracommando Brigade trained one of the first integrated brigades from January to June 2004. As of 13 September 2006, the Government had established 13 out of the 18 integrated brigades it had planned to create before the elections. (S/2006/759, 21 September 2006, 12) A fourteenth brigade was created by March 2007. (S/2007/156, 20 March 2007, 7) The standard brigade structure on paper was three battalions of 720 soldiers each, and a total of 2,500 troops.

Besides the first three integrated brigades, the rest were trained by Congolese instructors. The non-integrated brigades had no formal training, with fighters having only received basic infantry drills. The combining of the integrated and non-integrated units, beginning with the entry of CNDP fighters into the FARDC in 2009, reduced overall cohesion and training.

- 1st Brigade (integrated), Belgium began training this brigade in Kisangani on 9 February 2004, graduated June 2004. The first step was mixing the trainees to dissolve old lines of command. Next, Belgian personnel wanted to accelerate the program by training Congolese instructors to assist them, but their quality was so poor that the Belgians conducted the training themselves, and it took twice as long as initially planned. They also improved the soldiers' living conditions and equipment. The Belgians reported later that they were positive about the training program, but also that the unit continued to have problems that limited the program's lasting impact. Human rights reports in April and August 2007 place the Brigade in the Mahagi territory, Ituri area, Orientale Province. At Bavi, 30 km south of Bunia, between August and November 2006 forty civilians were slaughtered and buried in three different graves by soldiers of the 1st integrated Brigade.
- 2nd Brigade (integrated), trained by Angola at Kitona, and graduated 5 May 2005. The Angolan instructors experienced similar programs as the Belgians at the 1st Brigade. Ordered to move to North Kivu from Kinshasa, February 2006. (06KINSHASA178, 2 February 2006) Butembo, North Kivu, 28 July 2007 See also U.S. State Department, 06KINSHASA629 North Kivu: Struggling to Survive in Rutshuru Territory, 20 April 2006.
- 3rd Brigade (integrated), trained by Belgium and South Africa at Kamina. Graduated 1 June 2005. (05KINSHASA950, 10 June 2005) In the Bukavu area, late March 2007 (now 101st Brigade)
- 4th Brigade (integrated), training process finished [Monday] c.23 August 2005, then under the command of Colonel Willy Bonané RCD-G), a Tutsi officer close to Governor Eugene Serufuli, and was dispatched to Ituri. (ICG Africa Report 108, 27 April 2006, p. 16, and IRIN, Former militiamen now form army's 4th Brigade, 23 August 2005) Cholera broke out amongst the brigade, Aug-Sept 2005. Elements reported at Lopa, Ituri area, 24–25 July 2007
- 5th Brigade (integrated), deployed to North Kivu in August–September 2005. See ICG Africa Report 108, 27 April 2006, p. 16. "In January [2006], tensions escalated after human rights abuses were committed by soldiers of the FARDC 5th integrated brigade against Kinyarwanda speakers in Rutshuru territory. Insurgents belonging to the Laurent Nkunda militia, with elements of the 83rd brigade, attacked the FARDC 5th integrated brigade. They subsequently took over Rwindi and Kibrizi, prompting the withdrawal of FARDC from Rutshuru to Kanyabayonga. On 21 January, MONUC launched operations and successfully cleared Rwindi and Kibrizi of rebel elements." Brigade now at Kananga, Kasai-Occidental. See also U.S. State Department, 06KINSHASA481, 23 March 2006.
- 6th Brigade (integrated), said that 'the sixth and last brigade from the first phase of army integration is expected to be ready for deployment in late September' [2005]. Located Jiba, Ituri area, Orientale Province, May 2007 Ordered to leave Ituri for North Kivu for offensive against Laurent Nkunda, June 2007.
- 7th Brigade (integrated), finished forming Kitona March 2006. On 3 May 2006, it was reported that 'elements such as the 7th Integrated Brigade are still taking up space at the Rumangabu brassage center (North Kivu), for instance, and because they have not been fully deployed to Luberu (North Kivu), it isn't possible for the next group of soldiers to arrive at Rumangabu for integration.' (State Department,06KINSHASA711, SSR: Blockages Remain, 8 May 2006) Stationed in Maluku, Kinshasa August 2006 Elements of this brigade at Bolobo, Bandundu province, May 2007.
- 8th Brigade (integrated), Elements at Luberizi & Luvungi, in South Kivu, May 2007.
- 9th Brigade (integrated), North Kivu. Involved in a 5 August 2006, firefight between the 94th Battalion (of the 9th Integrated Brigade) against the 834th Battalion (of the non-integrated 83rd Brigade), at Sake, North Kivu.
- 10th Brigade (integrated), headquartered at Gemena, Equateur, 31 August 2007. (07KINSHASA1033, 31 August 2007) Deployed to the Dongo crisis in October 2009, suffering two defeats at the hands of Odjani Mangbama's forces. (Congo Siasa)
- 12th Brigade (integrated), HQ at Baraka, South Kivu
- 13th Brigade (integrated), Marabo, North Kivu, mid June 2007. Second battalion of this brigade in process of formation near Bunia mid August 2007.
- 14th Brigade (integrated), Kalima, South Kivu, May 2007, now numbered 105th Brigade. Africa Confidential reported in January 2008 that the brigade was a part of a 25,000 strong government attack on 4,000 of Laurent Nkunda's soldiers in December 2007, but was beaten back, with the loss of its 'entire arms and equipment.' Human Rights Watch's 'Soldiers Who Rape, Commanders Who Condone: Sexual Violence and Military Reform in the Democratic Republic of Congo,' July 2009, is a detailed study of this brigade's history and crimes.
- 15th Brigade (integrated) (waiting for deployment as of 30 May 2007, with 2,837 men assigned. Ordered to leave Kisangani for North Kivu for offensive against Laurent Nkunda, June, and then routed by Nkunda troops in the Sake area, early September 2007.
- 16th and 17th Brigades (integrated)(beginning 'brassage' integration process as of 30 May 2007, both over 4,000 strong at the beginning of the process) 17th Bde was later referred to in the Oxfam report 'Waking the Devil,' as well as later being in the Luhago/Kabona localities of Kabare territoire.
- 18th Brigade

Congolese soldiers being trained by American contractors wait for instructions during training at Camp Base, Kisangani, 5 May 2010

- 103rd Brigade (integrated)—previously designated 11th Brigade. Elements reported at Walungu, 110 km SW of Bukavu, South Kivu in the course of rape allegation 27 March 2007.
- 31st Rapid Response Unit Brigade — Formed between 2008 and 2017 with Belgian assistance, the brigade was described in 2020 as the best in the FARDC and has carried out successful operations. It is headquartered in Kindu, Maniema. In April 2024, a group of 3,000 soldiers from the brigade completed a year-long training program under Belgian instruction at the Camp Lwama Commando Training Center near Kindu.
- 32nd Rapid Response Unit Brigade — Formed between 2008 and 2017 at the Kamina military base. This unit was trained by Chinese instructors.

=== Updates in 2014 ===
In September 2014, President Kabila reshuffled the command structure and in addition to military regions created three new 'defense zones' which would be subordinated directly to the general staff. The defense zones essentially created a new layer between the general staff and the provincial commanders. The military regions themselves were reorganized and do not correspond with the ones that existed prior to the reshuffle. A Congolese military analyst based in Brussels, Jean-Jacques Wondo, provided an outline of the updated command structure of the FARDC following the shake up of the high command:

- 1st Defense Zone (Bas Congo, Bandundu, Équateur, and Kinshasa): Brig. Gen. Gabriel Amisi Kumba
  - 11th Military Region (Bandundu Province): Gen. Dieudonné Kiamata Mutupeke
  - 12th Military Region (Bas-Congo Province): Gen. Jonas Padiri Muhizi
  - 13th Military Region (Équateur Province): Gen. Luboya Kashama Djuni
  - 14th Military Region (Kinshasa): Brig. Gen. Camille Bombele Luwala
- 2nd Defense Zone (Kasai and Katanga): Maj. Gen. Jean Claude Kifwa
  - 21st Military Region (Kasai-Oriental and Kasai Occidental Provinces): Gen. Fall Jikabwe
  - 22nd Military Region (Katanga Province): Philemon Yav
- 3rd Defense Zone (Kivu, Maneima, and Katanga): Maj. Gen. Leon Mush ale Tsipamba
  - 31st Military Region (Bas-Uele and Tshopo Districts): Gen. Bertin Baseka Kamangala
  - 32nd Military Region (Haut-Uele and Ituri Districts): Gen. Jean-Pierre Bunguabele
  - 33rd Military Region (Maneima and South Kivu Provinces): Gen. Gaetan Kakudji Bobo
  - 34th Military Region (North Kivu Province): Maj. Gen. Emmanuel Lombe

=== Chiefs of staff ===
Known chiefs of staff of the land forces:

- Joseph Kabila (1999–2001)
- François Olenga (2001–2003)
- Sylvain Buki (2003–2006)
- Gabriel Amisi Kumba (2006–2012)
- François Olenga (2012–2014)
- Dieudonné Banze (2014–at least 2018)
- Isidore Kahungu (???–2020)
- Sikabwe Asinda Fall (2020–2024)
- Christian Ndaywel (2024–present)

=== Foreign assistance ===
A number of outside donor countries are also carrying out separate training programmes for various parts of the Forces du Terrestres (Land Forces). The People's Republic of China has trained Congolese troops at Kamina in Katanga from at least 2004 to 2009, and the Belgian government is training at least one 'rapid reaction' battalion. Between 2008 and 2017, the formation of the 31st Rapid Reaction Brigade was completed with Belgian assistance. Belgium's Chief of Defense, Admiral Michel Hofman, announced in 2022 that Belgium will continue assisting the unit. It received training from the Belgian Special Operations Regiment in 2022, and the European Union has provided it with €20 million of equipment in 2023. The EU announced in 2024 that it will spend €29.5 million on the brigade between 2023 and 2027.

When Kabila visited U.S. President George W. Bush in Washington D.C., he also asked the U.S. Government to train a battalion, and as a result, a private contractor, Protection Strategies Incorporated, started training a FARDC light infantry battalion at Camp Base, Kisangani, in February 2010. The unit of 750 Congolese soldiers would become known as the 391st Commando Battalion. The company was supervised by U.S. Special Operations Command Africa. The battalion was trained in small unit tactics, communications, medical care, and food production to sustain itself.

However, in 2013, during the M23 rebel advance in eastern Congo, several members of the 391st Commando Battalion were found to have committed mass rape against women fleeing from the warzone, and other atrocities.

== Republican Guard ==
In addition to the other land forces, there is a Republican Guard presidential force, formerly known as the Special Presidential Security Group (GSSP). FARDC military officials state that the Garde Républicaine is not the responsibility of FARDC, but the Head of State. Apart from Article 140 of the Law on the Army and Defence, no legal stipulation on the DRC's Armed Forces makes provision for the GR as a distinct unit within the national army. In February 2005, President Joseph Kabila passed a decree which appointed the GR's commanding officer and 'repealed any previous provisions contrary' to that decree. The GR is more than 10,000 strong (the ICG said 10,000–15,000 in January 2007), and has better working conditions and is paid regularly, but still commits rapes and robberies nearby their bases.

In an effort to extend his personal control across the country, then President Joseph Kabila deployed the GR at key airports, ostensibly in preparation for an impending presidential visit. At the end of 2005, there were Guards deployed in Mbandaka, Kindu, Lubumbashi, Bukavu, Kolwezi, staying many months after the President had left. They are still deployed at Kisangani's Bangoka airport, where they appear to answer to no local commander and have caused trouble with MONUC troops there.

The GR is also supposed to undergo the integration process, but as of January 2007, only one battalion had been announced as being integrated. Formed at a brassage centre in the Kinshasa suburb of Kibomango, the battalion included 800 men, half from the former GSSP and half from the MLC and RCD Goma.

== Equipment ==
Attempting to list the equipment available to the DRC's land forces is difficult; most figures are unreliable estimates based on known items delivered in the past. The IISS's Military Balance 2007 and Orbat.com's Concise World Armies 2005 give only slightly differing figures however (the figures below are from the IISS Military Balance 2007). Much of the Army's equipment is non-operational due to insufficient maintenance—in 2002 only 20 percent of the Army's armoured vehicles were estimated as being serviceable.

- Main Battle Tanks: 30 x Type 59, 20 x T-55, some T-72
- Reconnaissance vehicles: 40+ Type 62 light tanks, 40+ Panhard AML armoured cars, some EE-9 Cascavel
- Infantry Fighting Vehicles: 20 BMP-1
- Armoured Personnel Carriers: IISS reports M-113, Type 63, and wheeled vehicles including Casspir, Panhard M3, TH 390 Fahd, Wolf Turbo 2
- Artillery: 100 field guns, ranging from M116 howitzer 75 mm to Type 59 130 mm, and 30 Type 81 MRL

In addition to these 2007 figures, In March 2010, it was reported that the DRC's land forces had ordered US$80 million worth of military equipment from Ukraine which included 20 T-72 main battle tanks, 100 trucks and various small arms. 20 x T-72 have been reported by World Defence Almanac. Tanks have been used in the Kivus in the 2005-9 period.

In February 2014, Ukraine revealed that it had achieved the first export order for the T-64 tank to the DRC Land Forces for 50 T-64BV-1s. The shipment was delayed for two years due to the outbreak of the war in Donbass, and it was not until 2016 that the first order of 25 tanks of the upgraded T-64B1M variant (with the main difference being additional ERA tiles on the turret) was delivered. The rest were likely never sent. Congolese tank crewmen received training in Ukraine in 2014. The T-64B1Ms entered service with the Republican Guard, which receives the higher quality equipment (including the T-72AVs and EE-9s), while older T-55Ms (also from Ukraine) and Type 62s from China are used by the regular land forces. The T-64s were deployed during the Kawmina Nsapu rebellion.

== Personnel ==
=== Officers ===
The military leadership consists of ex-FAZ officers, who have professional training, and former rebel commanders, who often have little or no training. Commands are awarded based on the political logic of the power-sharing agreement that ended the Second Congo War, not on merit or competence. Patronage networks exist among army officers, which can be based on ethnicity or geography, or former military or group affiliation. This has led to many ex-rebels receiving command roles that they are not qualified for. At the higher levels, a commander (typically an ex-FAZ or ex-FAC officer) has several deputy commanders who are mainly from a former rebel faction. Officers also use their position to generate revenue by controlling businesses across different sectors of the economy. Some high-ranking officers run business empires.

The ex-FAZ officers were educated in Europe or the United States, notably at Belgium's Royal Military Academy, or in their own country at the Officers' Training School in Kananga.

Rank group	General / flag officers				Senior officers			Junior officers
Land Forces of the DR Congo
Land Forces of the DR Congo	Général d'armée	Lieutenant-général	Général-major	Général de brigade	Colonel	Lieutenant-colonel	Major	Capitaine	Lieutenant	Sous-lieutenant

=== Enlisted ===
In 2005, Congolese soldiers were paid US$10 per month, putting them below the international absolute poverty line of less than $1 per day. They did not have proper barracks, shelter, or transportation, and had to deploy by walking for hundreds of kilometers. Many died of disease or starvation. There were efforts to improve the soldiers' quality of life by building tented barracks or sanitation facilities. The creation of a central biometric database and ID cards for soldiers in 2008, and the EU mission delivering payments directly to soldiers of the integrated brigades, reduced corruption and allowed pay to be increased to $60 per month. In 2013 it was reportedly $70, as of 2024, it was $100. Congolese soldiers are not always provided with food, and they also engage in small-scale agriculture.

As of 2024, soldiers receive a "few months" of training.

Rank group	Senior NCOs							Junior NCOs	Enlisted
Land Forces of the DR Congo										No insignia
Land Forces of the DR Congo	Adjudant-chef	Adjudant de première classe	Adjudant	Premier sergent major	Sergent major	Premier sergent	Sergent	Caporal	Soldat de première classe	Soldat de seconde classe	Recrue

== Other forces active in the country ==
=== United Nations ===
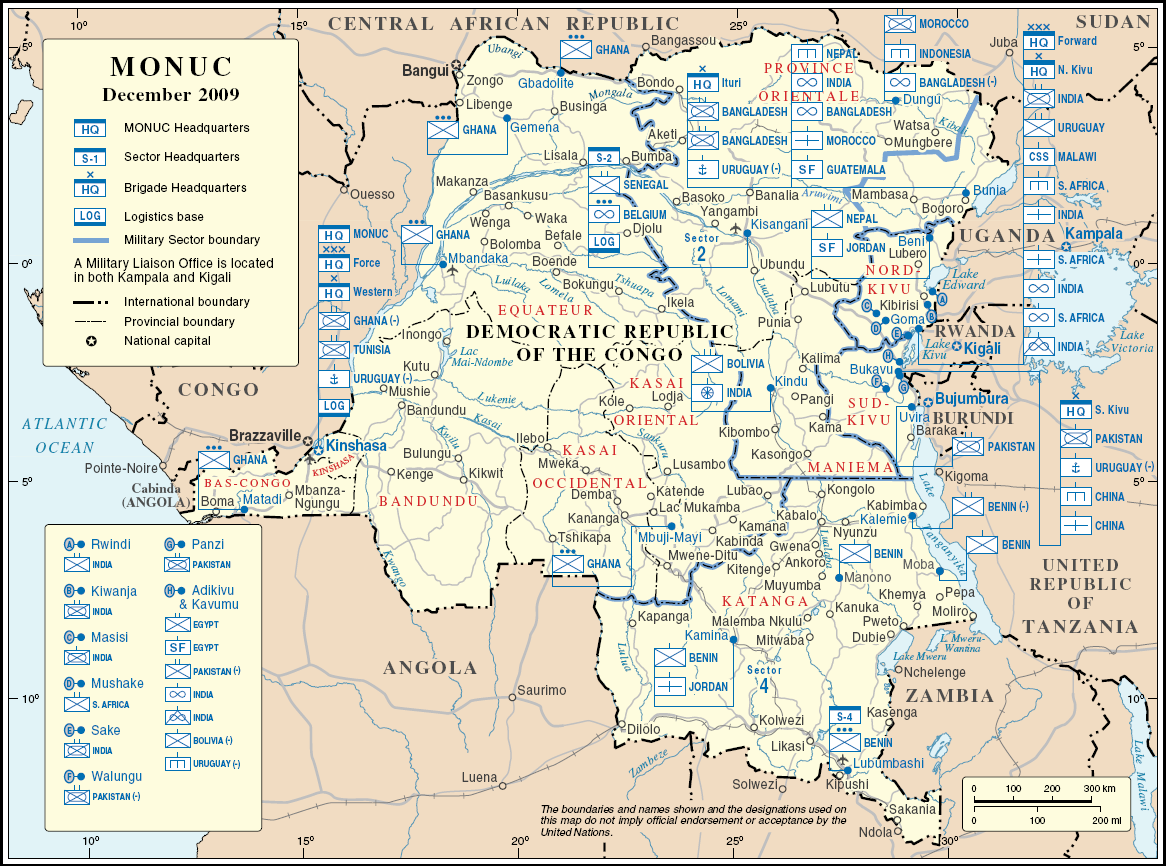
Locations of MONUC units as at December 2009

There are currently large numbers of United Nations troops stationed in the DRC. The United Nations Organization Stabilization Mission in the Democratic Republic of the Congo (MONUSCO) As of 31 August 2011 had a strength of over 19,000 peacekeepers (including 16,998 military personnel) and has a mission of assisting Congolese authorities maintain security. The UN and foreign military aid missions, the most prominent being EUSEC RD Congo, are attempting to assist the Congolese in rebuilding the armed forces, with major efforts being made in trying to assure regular payment of salaries to armed forces personnel and also in military justice. Retired Canadian Lieutenant General Marc Caron also served for a time as Security Sector Reform advisor to the head of MONUC.

=== Non- and anti-government forces ===
Groups of anti-Rwandan government rebels like the FDLR, and other foreign fighters remain inside the DRC. The FDLR which is the greatest concern, was some 6,000 strong, as of July 2007. By late 2010 the FDLR's strength however was estimated at 2,500.

The other groups are smaller: the Ugandan Lord's Resistance Army, the Ugandan rebel group the Allied Democratic Forces in the remote area of Mt Rwenzori, and the Burundian Parti pour la Libération du Peuple Hutu—Forces Nationales de Liberation (PALIPEHUTU-FNL).

=== Government paramilitaries ===
Finally there is a government paramilitary force, created in 1997 under President Laurent Kabila. The National Service is tasked with providing the army with food and with training the youth in a range of reconstruction and developmental activities. There is not much further information available, and no internet-accessible source details the relationship of the National Service to other armed forces bodies; it is not listed in the constitution. President Kabila, in one of the few comments available, says National Service will provide a gainful activity for street children. Obligatory civil service administered through the armed forces was also proposed under the Mobutu regime during the 'radicalisation' programme of December 1974-January 1975; the FAZ was opposed to the measure and the plan 'took several months to die.'
