= Lucien Bahuma =

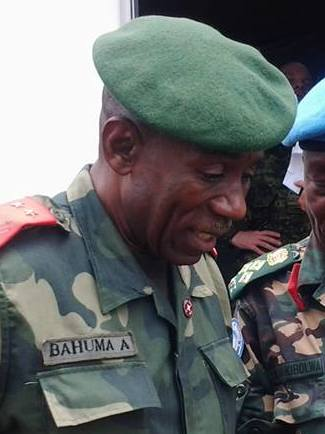
- Born: Jean-Lucien Bahuma Ambamba; 1957
- Died: 2014 (aged 56–57); North Kivu, Democratic Republic of the Congo
- Military career
- Allegiance: Zaire; Movement for the Liberation of the Congo; Democratic Republic of the Congo
- Branch: Land Forces
- Service years: ?–2014
- Rank: Major General
- Commands: 8th Military Region
- Conflicts: Second Congo War; Kivu conflict; M23 rebellion (2012–2013)

Major General Jean-Lucien Bahuma Ambamba (1957–2014) was a Congolese army officer. Bahuma, described as an "exceptional soldier" by Le Potentiel and one of the Congo's "most popular and reform-minded officers" by The Economist, commanded the Armed Forces of the Democratic Republic of the Congo (FARDC) in the provinces of North and South Kivu during the M23 rebellion and Allied Democratic Forces insurgency.

== Early life and education ==
Bahuma was born in the village of Tolaw in Isangi Territory, near Kisangani, in 1957. He began his military career under the regime of Mobutu Sese Seko, attending military academies in the Congo and France.

== Military career ==
During the Second Congo War, he commanded the military wing of the Movement for the Liberation of the Congo (MLC) and was later re-integrated into the Congolese army.

Bahuma was appointed to the command of the 8th Military Region, covering Kivu, by President Joseph Kabila following the fall of Goma to M23 rebels in 2012. The fall of Goma in November 2012 was widely perceived as an embarrassment for the FARDC and the United Nations' MONUSCO peacekeeping force and led to calls for reform. Morale among government forces in the region was low. After taking command, Bahuma reformed the FARDC in the region, cutting down on corruption. He was personally credited for much of the FARDC's subsequent success against M23 in the Kivu region by international observers. He gained a reputation as a reformist, alongside Lieutenant General François Olenga and Colonel Mamadou Ndala, and attempted to turn the FARDC into a professional military force.

During a diplomatic mission to Uganda in August 2014, Bahuma suffered a heart attack. Taken to a hospital in Pretoria, South Africa, he died on 30 August aged 57. His death was viewed by some as suspicious, following the assassination of Ndala, head of the Unité de réponse rapide (URR), in Kivu eight months previously. It was rumoured that he had been poisoned. Foreign commentators rejected this theory, but noted that Bahuma's death would slow attempts to reform the FARDC. Bahuma received posthumous tributes from a number of leading Congolese politicians and was posthumously awarded Officer of the Order of the National Heroes Kabila-Lumumba by President Kabila. A 48-hour period of mourning was observed by students at the Christian Bilingual University of Congo in Beni, North Kivu in his honour. In September, Brigadier General Emmanuel Lombe Bangwangu was announced as Bahuma's replacement as head of the 8th Military Region.
