= Paul-Joseph Mukungubila =

Congolese religious and political figure (born 1947)

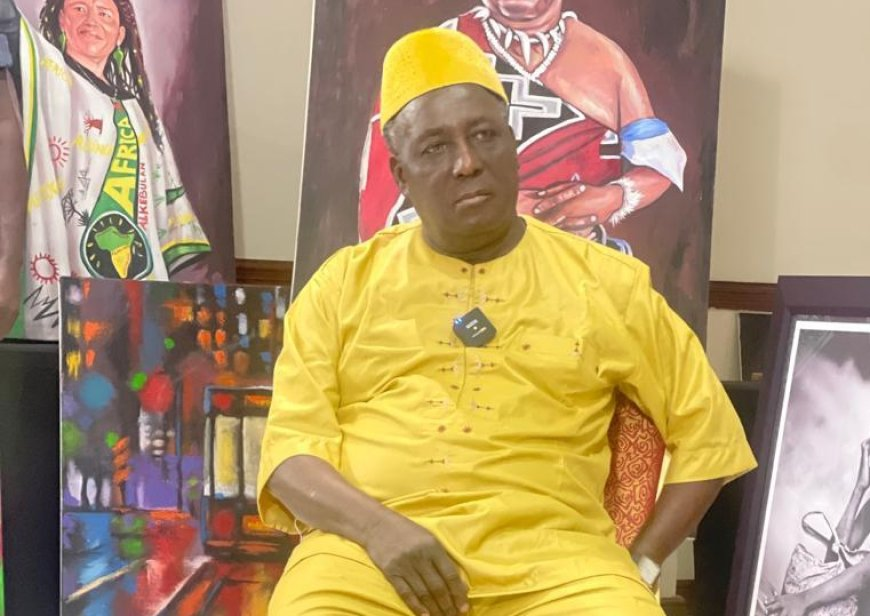
Paul Joseph Mukungubila Mutombo, 2023

Paul Joseph Mukungubila Mutombo (born 26 December 1947) is a Congolese religious and political figure. He is the leader of the "Church of the Lord Jesus Christ", established in Kinshasa, Lubumbashi, Kolwezi, Kalemie, Brussels, Paris and Washington DC area. He declared himself "prophet of the Lord" for "The Ministry of Restoration from Sub-Saharan Africa (Black Africa)".

His disciples declared that he is the leader announced by the prophecies of Simon Kimbangu and the Bitawala (or Kitawala) on the advent of the true independence of the Democratic Republic of the Congo (DRC).

A candidate in the 2006 presidential election in the Democratic Republic of the Congo, he is opposed to Joseph Kabila because he accused Kabila of being a foreigner from Rwanda. In his speeches in the media, and through open letters to the international community, he regularly denounced the "Rwandan occupation", the attempts to "Balkanize" the DRC, alleged daily mass rapes of Congolese children and women by men from Burundi, Rwanda and Uganda, the massacre of the civilian population, the selling-off of the raw materials, and the alleged looting of the natural resources of the DRC by neighboring countries, including Rwanda.

On 11 May 2010 a demonstration of his followers was suppressed. Several of his disciples came to demand the release of three of them detained the day before. A press release from the Voice of the Voiceless (La Voix des Sans Voix), a Congolese human rights NGO, speaks of shots "at close range in the crowd, without any warning" by "soldiers of the former DEMIAP". There were reports of one dead, six wounded and five missing among the demonstrators.

On 5 February 2011, Mukungubila was awarded the Diploma of Excellence and Civil Merit by the Association of Political Journalists of the Congo (AJPC), for having particularly made himself famous in Democratic Republic of Congo and in the concert of the nations by the work, the virtue, and actions of large scale (political, social, cultural, diplomatic, spiritual, sportive, military, police, philanthropic and others ...) in favor of his nation.

On Wednesday, 2 March 2011, the Patriotic Congolese Journalists Network awarded Mukungubila a diploma and a trophy of merit and patriotism to celebrate a rich enough past in favor of the populations of the Democratic Republic of Congo. The selection of the jury was unanimous in Paul Joseph Mukungubila.

On 30 December 2013, riots took place in several towns in the DRC, including the capital Kinshasa, Lubumbashi, Kolwezi, Kindu and Kisangani. Several demonstrators claiming to be Mukungubila followers converged on several strategic sites, including the RTNC (Congolese National Radio and Television) headquarters to express their anger in response to attacks earlier in the morning by security forces against two residences of Joseph Mukungubila in Lubumbashi where several adepts were gathered. These residences also serve as a place of worship. An investigation report, published in May 2014 by the League of Voters (la Ligue des Electeurs), a Congolese human rights NGO affiliated to International Federation for Human Rights (FIDH), speaks of serious violations of human rights perpetrated by the Congolese Army towards the "followers of the Ministry of Restoration from Sub-Saharan Africa", notably by referring to "massacres", "summary executions", and "arbitrary arrests" committed, in particular, by elements of The Republican Guard. About a hundred followers were arrested and detained in prison in Kinshasa and Lubumbashi, with 54 others killed by security forces. Mukungubila went into exile in South Africa when an international arrest warrant was issued by Interpol at the request of the Congolese government for his extradition. On 15 May 2014 he was arrested, brought before the Magistrates Court in Johannesburg and released on bail during his trial. A year later, on 15 May 2015, the trial ended with the South African justice deciding to abandon the prosecution against him and thus reject the extradition request made by the Congolese government because of "insufficient evidence".

Since the end of 2013, Mukungubila has sent numerous letters to the international community to address the political and humanitarian crisis in the DRC. In his open letter to François Hollande dated 18 April 2016, he asked the latter to stop receiving Joseph Kabila at the Elysée and questioned him about the "tragedy" in the DRC, saying: "To conclude Mr. President, It would be for us a big consolation that you cannot endorse this incomparable tragedy that taking place in the DRC, caused by the Rwandan invasion. Think of the French dead who fell during the occupation of your country by Germans, which had forced General De Gaulle to find himself in Brazzaville, in the Congo, and which he declared to be the capital of free France".
