= List of conflicts in the Democratic Republic of the Congo =

Map showing the present-day location of the Democratic Republic of the Congo (green) within Southern Africa.

This is a list of conflicts in Democratic Republic of the Congo arranged chronologically from the early modern period to present day. This list includes nationwide and international wars, including: wars of independence, liberation wars, colonial wars, undeclared wars, proxy wars, territorial disputes, and world wars. Also listed might be any battle that occurred within the territory of what is today known as the, "Democratic Republic of the Congo" but was itself only part of an operation of a campaign of a theater of a war. There may also be periods of violent civil unrest listed, such as: riots, shootouts, spree killings, massacres, terrorist attacks, and civil wars. The list might also contain episodes of: human sacrifice, mass suicide, massacres, and genocides.

== Early modern period ==
=== Kingdom of Kongo ===
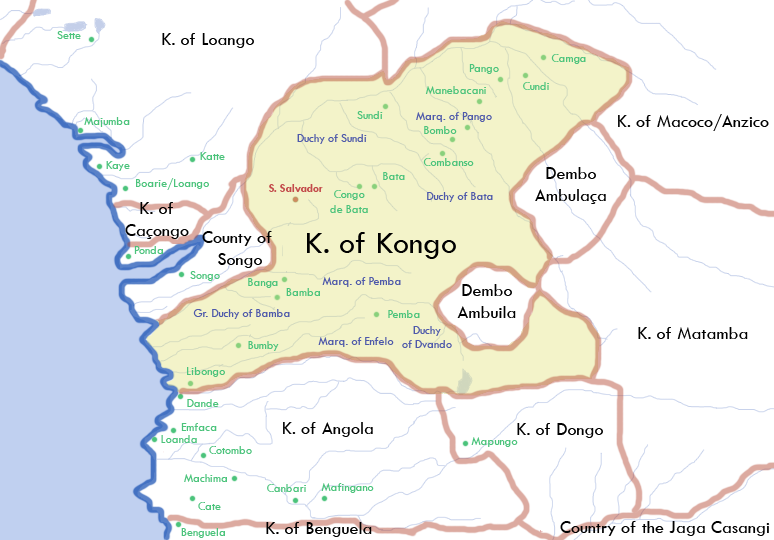
Map showing the Kingdom of Kongo in 1711.

- 1622 Kongo-Portuguese War
- 1665–1709 Kongo Civil War

== Late modern period ==
=== Congo Free State ===
- 1892–1894 Congo Arab war
- 1895–1908 Batetela Rebellions

== Contemporary history ==
=== Republic of the Congo ===
- 1960–1965 Congo Crisis
  - 8 November 1960 Niemba Ambush
  - 17 January 1961 Assassination of Patrice Lumumba
  - September 1961 Siege of Jadotville
  - 11–12 November 1961 Kindu atrocity
  - January–November 1964 Simba Rebellion
- July 1966 Kisangani Mutinies

=== Republic of Zaire ===
- 8 March – 26 May 1977 Shaba I
- May–June 1978 Shaba II
- 1987–ongoing Lord's Resistance Army insurgency
- 24 October 1996 – 16 May 1997 First Congo War

=== Democratic Republic of the Congo ===
- 2 August 1998 — 18 July 2003 Second Congo War
  - 1999 — 2007 Ituri Conflict
    - 24 February 2003 Bogoro massacre
    - 12 June 2003 Operation Artemis
    - December 2005 Operation North Night Final
  - 2002 — 2003 Effacer le tableau
  - 2004 — ongoing Kivu Conflict
    - 26 October 2008 — 23 March 2009 Nord-Kivu campaign
    - 20 January 2009 — 27 February 2009 Eastern Congo offensive
    - 2022 — ongoing Democratic Republic of the Congo–Rwanda conflict (2022–present)
    - 4 April 2012 — 7 November 2013 M23 rebellion
- 2007 — ongoing ADF insurgency
- 2009 Dongo conflict
- 27 February 2011 Democratic Republic of the Congo coup d'état attempt
- 30 December 2013 Kinshasa attacks
- 2020 Congo attacks
- 2021 Congo attacks

== See also ==
- Military of the Democratic Republic of the Congo
- Land Forces of the Democratic Republic of the Congo
- Air Force of the Democratic Republic of the Congo
- Navy of the Democratic Republic of the Congo
- Military history of Africa
- African military systems up until the year 1800
- African military systems between the years 1800 and 1900
- African military systems after the year 1900
