= Dieudonné Banze =

Major General Dieudonné Banze Lubundji is a Congolese general who has served as the commander of the Republican Guard and, since 2014, the chief of staff of the Land Forces of the Democratic Republic of the Congo.

In 2017 he established a command post in Kananga to oversee the FARDC operations against the rebels in the Kamwina Nsapu rebellion.
