= Mamadou Ndala =

Congolese military officer (1978–2014)

Colonel Mamadou Ndala
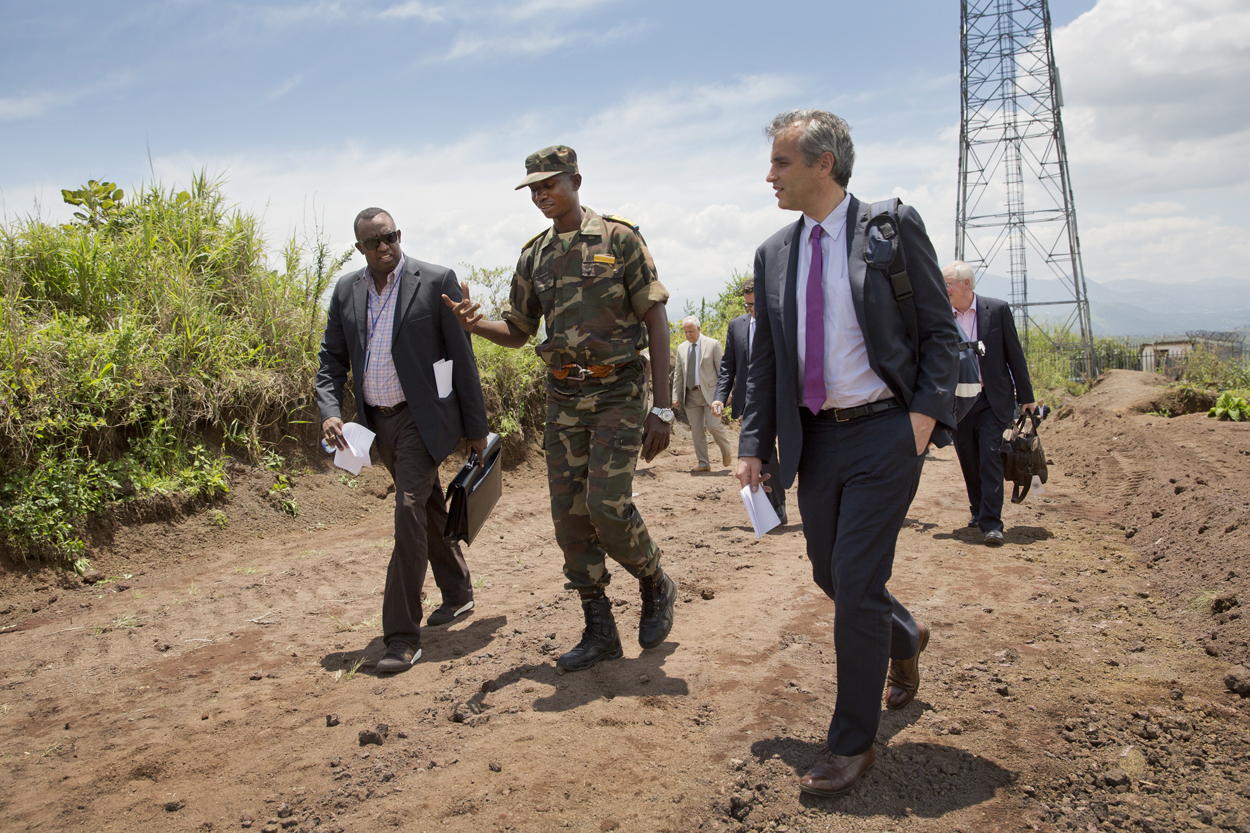
- Mamadou Ndala (center) with Eugene-Richard Gasan and Alexis Lamek in Goma, 2013
- Born: Mamadou Mustafa Ndala; 8 December 1978; Ibambi, Orientale Province, Zaire
- Died: 2 January 2014 (aged 35) North Kivu, Democratic Republic of the Congo
- Buried: Kokolo Camp, Kinshasa
- Allegiance: Democratic Republic of the Congo
- Branch: Congolese Army
- Service years: 1997–2014
- Rank: Brigadier general
- Commands: 42nd Battalion Commando Units Rapid Reaction FARDC
- Conflicts: Second Congo War; Kivu conflict; M23 rebellion (2012–2013); ADF insurgency
- Children: 3

Mamadou Mustafa Ndala (8 December 1978 – 2 January 2014) was a Congolese military officer. He commanded the Congolese Army's 42nd Battalion Rapid Reaction Force, which was formed by Belgium, Angola, United States and China. Ndala rose to prominence following his battlefield victories and successes over the March 23 Movement (M23) rebel fighters during the M23 rebellion (2012–2013).

He was killed in an ambush along with his two bodyguards on 2 January 2014. According to the Congolese government, the ambush carried by Ugandan militants from the Allied Democratic Forces (ADF). Following Ndala's death, two Congolese army colonels were found guilty of hiring Ugandan-backed rebels to carry out the assassination for $20,000. Ndala was married and the father of three children, and was buried in Kokolo Camp in Kinshasa and appointed brigadier general posthumously.

== Biography ==
=== Childhood ===
Mamadou Ndala was born in the former province of Haut-Zaire and grew up in a Muslim family, a religion he practiced until his death. He did his primary studies in Ibambi and continued his secondary studies at the Aiglons Institute in Isiro, the capital of the Haut-Uélé Province. He then enrolled himself in the Petits Anges school complex. His childhood friends describe him as an excellent footballer. Ndala was specifically involved in Africa Sport, a local team of Isiro, which dissolved a few years ago.

=== Military career ===
Ndala enrolled the army in June 1997. Fourteen years later, in January 2011, he was promoted to the rank of colonel. He took command of the 42nd Battalion of the Rapid Reaction Unit Commandos. Ndala was quickly noticed by the population of Goma. In July and August 2013, he led the victorious offensives against the M23 fighters who besieged the city. The inertia of the peacekeepers had eventually bored the population.

At first, the victories of Ndala's men left the population doubtful. The Congolese Army had accustomed the population to bewildering riots, as in November 2012 when the M23 seized the city of Goma, deserted by the national army. Three months earlier, in an interview with Belgian journalist Colette Braeckman, Rwandan General James Kabarebe claimed that the Congolese army were not even capable of killing a rat.

The Congolese were in a mixture of resentment and humiliation. They were amazed when they saw their soldiers impose themselves on the battlefield and show the bodies of enemies until then presented as invincible. The battles were tough and the M23 suffered heavy losses. Colonel Mamadou Ndala intervened with the population angry with MONUSCO, whose ambiguous attitude raisesd fears of a turnaround. Especially after an ultimatum he launched against the M23, followed by a backpedal. Anti-MONUSCO crowds threw pebbles at the convoys of MONUSCO. Only Colonel Ndala's interventions with the population made it possible to calm the situation.

==== Rumors ====
In mid-July, a rumor announcing the recall of Ndala to Kinshasa provoked violent demonstrations in Goma against MONUSCO. President Joseph Kabila was accused of wanting to paralyze the army and the colonel. It is a practice long explored in the Congo: officers who distinguished themselves in combat are recalled to Kinshasa and neutralized, as if there was a political will aimed at making the conflict between the Congo and Rwanda last.

Previously, the name of General Mbuza Mabe, nicknamed the man of Bukavu, came up in all conversations. This former officer of the Forces Armées Zaïroises, then the FARDC, is known to have saved the town of Bukavu in 2004. The city had been invaded by troops commanded by General Laurent Nkunda and Colonel Jules Mutebutsi. After his military triumph in Bukavu, Félix Mbuza Mabe was recalled by Kinshasa and sent to the Kitona base. In 2009, he died in Johannesburg after a long illness, probably due to poisoning. The population of Goma was surprised and had panicked by the idea that the famous colonel was to the point of suffering the same fate.

==== Turning point ====
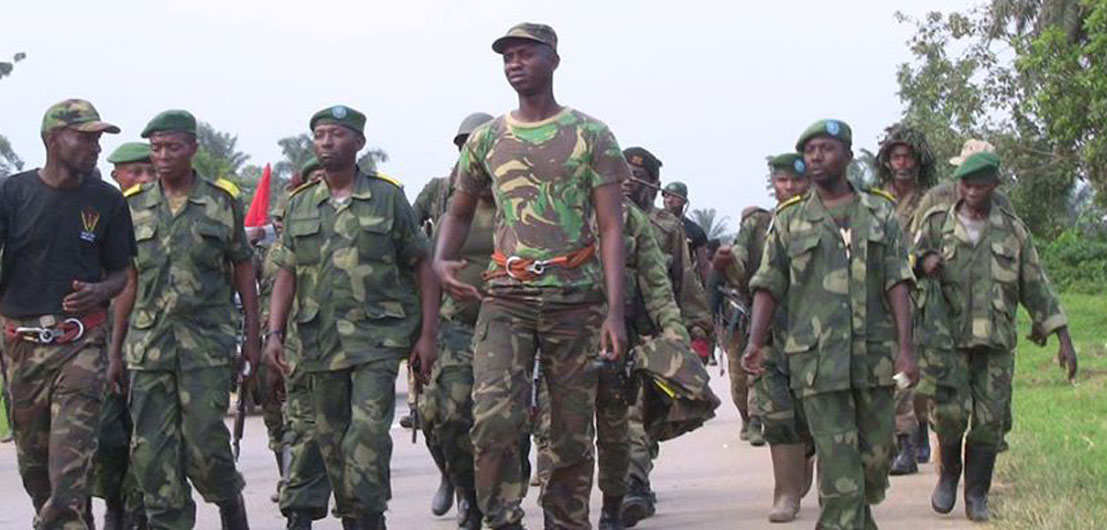
Colonel Mamadou Ndala leading a military operation against AFD-Nalu, 2013

The war had a decisive turning point in favour of the Congolese at the end of August 2013 when the M23 launched shells on the city of Goma. A sizeable FARDC offensive supported by the intervention brigade of MONUSCO led Mamadou Ndala's troops to their greatest feat of arms, the conquest of the "three branches" in the Kibati sector. (Note: Monusco's intervention brigade was then made up of Tanzanian and South African soldiers. Tanzanians are all the more motivated in combat as their President, Jakaya Kikwete, is in open conflict with Rwandan President Paul Kagame.) The Battle of Kibati caused heavy losses to the M23 which left large quantities of ammunition and left the M23 population sinking in doubt.

After Kibumba, Kiwanja and Rutshuru-center, the Congolese army seized the base of Rumangabo on 28 October 2013. The victories of the FARDC are linked until the resumption of Bunagana. On 30 October 2013, Ndala triumphantly returned to the city in victory. In the process, Martin Kobler, the head of MONUSCO announced the end of the 23 March Movement as a military force.

==== Conflict death toll ====
The fighting between the FARDC and the 23 March Movement claimed the lives of more than 900 combatants according to the Congolese authorities. "Since May 20 and until November 5, the FARDC had 201 dead and 680 wounded. On the side of the M23, there were 721 dead and 543 captured, including 72 Rwandans and 28 Ugandans," said General Jean-Lucien Bahuma, commander of the 8th Military Region, which includes the province of North Kivu and the theater fights. Three peacekeepers from the UN mission were killed.

==== The last mission ====
In accordance with UN Security Council Resolution 2098 (2013), the operation to neutralize all armed groups should continue. Colonel Mamadou Ndala was sent to the north of the Province of North Kivu, in the territory of Beni where a violent armed group, the ADF-Nalu, dominates, known for multiple abuses including kidnappings of civilians (more than 600 people over three years) and massacres. Colonel Ndala made a commitment in front of the population to track down these resistance fighters, even under water.

The Congolese army, under his command, had secured the area and retook the city of Kamango. It had fallen on December 25, 2013, from the hands of fighters from Uganda. He was preparing to launch a general offensive to liquidate the ADF-Nalu. Army units were positioned.

=== Ambush and death ===
On January 2, 2014, in the late morning, Colonel Mamadou Ndala and his escort were about to leave the Albertine hotel in Beni-Boikene, going towards Eringeti aboard a pickup truck with a mounted heavy machine gun. Near the locality of Ngadi, the section fell into an ambush. An RPG-7 rocket hit the front of the pickup truck Ndala was inside of, killing the occupants instantly.

Two Armed Forces of the Democratic Republic of the Congo Colonels were found guilty of hiring Ugandan-backed rebels to carry out the assassination for $20,000.
