= Jean Schramme =

Belgian mercenary

Major Jean Schramme
- Nickname: "Black Jack"
- Born: Jean Schramme; 25 March 1929; Bruges, West Flanders, Belgium
- Died: 14 December 1988 (aged 59) Rondonópolis, Mato Grosso, Brazil
- Allegiance: Belgium; Katanga; (Democratic Republic of the Congo) Republic of the Congo
- Branch: (Belgium) Belgian Land Component; (State of Katanga) Gendarmerie; (Democratic Republic of the Congo) 10 Commando
- Service years: ?–1953 (Belgium); 1961–1963 (Katanga); 1964–1965 (Republic of the Congo)
- Rank: Major
- Commands: Chief of Police, Katanga; Major, 10 Commando
- Conflicts: Congo Crisis; Simba Rebellion; Kisangani Mutinies; Carnation Revolution
- Other work: Technical Adviser, Exército de Libertação de Portugal

Jean "Black Jack" Schramme (25 March 1929 – 14 December 1988) was a Belgian mercenary and planter. He managed a vast estate in the Democratic Republic of the Congo until 1967.

== Planter ==
Schramme was born into an upper-middle-class family in Bruges, where his father was a successful lawyer. In 1947, Schramme moved to the Belgian Congo at the age of 18, where he worked as an apprentice for a planter. Schramme had a strong entrepreneurial streak and by the age of 22 he already owned his own plantation covering 22 acres at Bafwakwandji in the eastern half of the Belgian Congo. Schramme performed his national service with the Force Publique, which provided him with his military training.

Mr Schramme deeply loved Africa and called himself un Africain blanc ("a white African"). Schramme ran his estate along militaristic lines, having a very authoritarian and paternalistic leadership style as he took to calling himself a père ("father") to his black African workers. Schramme thought that he understood the Congo far better than the Congolese, and believed that the country should remain a Belgian colony forever. He hated the évolués (Western-educated Congolese) who for him were not real Congolese at all; his ideal Congolese were his workers on his estate who called him père. In Schramme's viewpoint, he and the other Belgian settlers should provide the strict, but loving paternalistic care that he believed was what the Congolese needed.

== Congo Crisis ==
In January 1959, riots erupted as hundreds of thousands of Congolese took to the streets to demand independence, which led the Belgian state to agree that the Belgian Congo would become independent on 30 June 1960. Unwilling to accept Congolese independence, in the spring of 1960, Schramme started to stockpile arms and ammunition while he attached metal plates and a machinegun to his car to create a makeshift armored car. On 30 June 1960, the Belgian Congo was granted independence, and shortly afterwards the Congolese Army mutinied against the Belgian officers who had been placed in charge owing to the lack of Congolese officers. With the Congo falling into chaos, Schramme provided an armed guard to move Belgian settlers into the British colony of Uganda. Schramme claimed to have been arrested twice and to have seen eight white settlers hanged without a trial, through the historian Christopher Othen noted that Schramme was prone to lies and exaggerations, and his accounts might very well be fabrications. Schramme himself fled to Uganda, where he heard about the State of Katanga led by Moïse Tshombe. Schramme went to Katanga to fight as a mercenary and to reestablish himself as a planter in Africa, having abandoned his estate.

In the spring of 1961, Schramme enlisted in Groupe Mobile E, a mercenary unit commanded by a hard-drinking Scotsman, Robert Chambers, who called himself Louis Chamois, and whose French was atrocious. Schramme was not impressed with Chambers, whom he stated: "At first glance, I thought I was dealing with a double crazy drunk. He pretended to be an officer, but he was interested in nothing more than his bottle and his revolver". The Groupe Mobile E had a terrible reputation for cruelty; with one Belgian settler, Frans Heymans, complaining in May 1961 of "the brutalities at the hands of Chamois and his men". Schramme was furious when the United Nations ordered the Belgian settlers out of Katanga, writing in 1969: "The United Nations had imposed their orders on Tshombe, not a single white in the Katangese administration or army. You cannot imagine a more racist decision. We were being expelled on the basis of the color of our skin." Schramme was arrested by Swedish soldiers serving as United Nations peacekeepers and expelled to Belgium on 17 September 1961 as a troublemaker. Schramme spent several weeks in Belgium, and then went to the British colony of Southern Rhodesia (modern Zimbabwe), where he purchased the book Quotations from Chairman Mao to "know his enemy" as he phrased it. Schramme then returned to Katanga.

During his time in Southern Rhodesia, Schramme had recruited several white British and South African settlers to come with him to fight for Katanga. In October 1961, Schramme took the town of Kisamba from the Congolese, proudly reporting his small unit had just routed two battalions of the Armée Nationale Congolaise, owing to their superior discipline. Schramme's claims to have taken Kisamba were not believed at first, leading him to ask if he should give Kisamba back to the Armée Nationale Congolaise if they did not believe that his out-numbered force could have defeated two battalions on its own. Schramme was promoted to the rank of lieutenant. Following the final defeat of Katanga, in January–February 1963, Schramme led a force of about 400 Katangese gendarmes into Angola.

In 1964, the Simba rebellion erupted and the entire eastern half of the Congo was taken by the Simba rebels while the Armée Nationale Congolaise disintegrated. Believing that he needed the support of the West, the army commander, General Joseph-Désiré Mobutu persuaded President Joseph Kasa-Vubu to appoint Tshombe premier on 9 July 1964. Tshombe, who had used mercenaries extensively as the leader of Katanga brought back the same mercenaries that he had used to fight against the Congo to now fight for the Congo. Schramme was one of the mercenaries whom Tshombe recruited to fight for the Congo, crossing over from the then Portuguese colony of Angola. Schramme commanded the Batabwa group, which operated independently of the Lunda group commanded by another mercenary, Ferdinand Tshipola, a state of affairs that owed to personal rivalries between Schramme and Tshipola than ethnic rivalries between the Batabaw and Lunda peoples.

== The Revolt of the Mercenaries ==
In 1965, General Mobutu became president and from then on Belgium started protecting his regime against rebellion. Mobutu immediately began to arrest the former government ministers of Congo. Mobutu had long disliked the white mercenaries in his country as reflecting an adverse comment upon his military competence, and over the course of 1966 and the first half of 1967 steadily reduced the number of mercenaries. From December 1966 to July 1967, the number of mercenaries in the Congo had been reduced from about 650 down to 189 as Mobutu paid the last of their wages and then sent them home. In June 1967, the French mercenary Bob Denard warned Schramme that Mobutu was planning to dissolve the last of the mercenary units, which provided the impetus for a plan to restore Tshombe.

On 30 June 1967 president Moïse Tshombe's jet aircraft was hijacked en route to Algiers, before he could return to Congo after his exile in Spain. He was imprisoned in Algeria and two years later he died in suspicious circumstances. For Schramme, this was a sign that he was fighting the wrong enemy and on 3 July 1967 he began to lead an uprising in the Tshopo province against Mobutu along with fellow mercenaries Denard and Jerry Puren. According to Puren the uprising was part of a plan to restore Tshombe to power but derailed by the hijacking: the mercenaries planned to move south and link up with Katangan exiles crossing from Angola. This was known as the Mercenaries Revolt. Jack Malloch, the Rhodesian pilot and gun-runner, supported Schramme's forces with flights supplying him with weapons.

On the morning of 5 July 1967 10 Commando ANC, Schramme's unit, launched surprise attacks on Stanleyville, Kindu, and Bukavu. Schramme led the attack on the army's barracks at Stanleyville, leading a force of 11 white mercenaries and about 100 Katangese in the assault. The attack killed hundreds of Congolese soldiers and their families, leading the wrathful Congolese to execute 30 mercenaries not involved in the coup attempt. The attack that Schramme planned was described as "badly executed" as he behaved with over-confidence in believing that his small force would be enough to take Stanleyville. The Congolese fought back and within a week, Schramme had been forced to retreat from Stanleyville.

Schramme tried to take control of Stanleyville. Defeated, his force retreated south into Kivu province. By 10 August his troops conquered the border town of Bukavu and had grown considerably in number. Schramme was able to hold Bukavu for seven weeks and managed to defeat all ANC troops who were sent to retake the town. The ANC suffered from a lack of artillery and was frustrated and demotivated over its continuous losses. By accident, some ANC T-28 flying missions even attacked their own troops instead of Schramme's. The shortages of ammunition were a major problem for the ANC, but Schramme's forces suffered from even greater shortages of ammunition as the expected support from abroad failed to arrive. Extra forces including the elite 2nd Parachute Brigade helped the ANC to finally defeat Schramme on 29 October 1967. The surviving rebel troops fled into Rwanda.

A number of Katangese gendarmes fled into Angola, where they retained their loyalty to the Mwaant Yav, the traditional king of the Lunda people. The exiles were recruited by the Portuguese colonial authorities to fight against the Angolan guerrillas. Thomas Tshombe, the brother of Moïse Tshombe and the current reigning Mwaant Yav, pressed for Schramme to be placed in charge of the Katangese exiles in Angola, a request refused by the Portuguese authorities who did not want such a well-known man in Angola.

== Later life ==
On 24 April 1968 Schramme and all the other European mercenaries returned to Belgium. Almost 20 years later, on 17 April 1986, he was sentenced to 20 years in prison for a murder. Schramme was not living in Belgium at the time of the sentence: he died in 1988 on his farm in Mato Grosso, Brazil.

== Media portrayal ==
Schramme was played by the French actor Aladin Reibel in the 2011 film Mister Bob.

== See also ==
- Mike Hoare

== Books ==
- Kennes, Kennes; Larmer, Miles (2016). The Katangese Gendarmes and War in Central Africa. Bloomington: Indiana University Press. ISBN 9780253021502.
- Othen, Christopher (2015). Katanga 1960-63: Mercenaries, Spies and the African Nation that Waged War on the World. Cheltenham: The History Press. ISBN 0750989165.
- Young, Crawford; Turner, Thomas (1985). The Rise and Decline of the Zairian State. Madison: University of Wisconsin Press. ISBN 9780299101138.
