= Stanleyville mutinies =

1966–1967 failed mutinies in the DRC

Date	1966 (first mutiny); 1967 (second mutiny)
Location	Stanleyville, Democratic Republic of the Congo
Result	Mutinies failed

Belligerents
Congo-Léopoldville	Armée Nationale Congolaise (ANC) mutineers

Commanders and leaders
Mobutu Sese Seko; Léonard Mulamba	No centralized leadership (first mutiny); Jean Schramme (second mutiny)

Strength
32,000 troops	2,000 (first mutiny); 1,100 (second mutiny)

The Stanleyville mutinies, also known as the Mercenaries' mutinies, occurred in the Democratic Republic of the Congo in 1966 and 1967.

== First mutiny ==
Amid rumours that the ousted prime minister Moïse Tshombe was plotting a comeback from his exile in Spain, some 2,000 of Tshombe's former Katangan gendarmes, led by mercenaries, mutinied in Kisangani (formerly Stanleyville) in July 1966. Lieutenant-Colonel Joseph-Damien Tshatshi, the local military commander, was executed. The mutiny was unsuccessful and was crushed.

== Second mutiny ==
Exactly a year after the failure of the first mutiny, another broke out, again in Kisangani, apparently triggered by the news that Tshombe's airplane had been hijacked over the Mediterranean and forced to land in Algiers, where he was held prisoner. Led by a Belgian settler/mercenary named Jean Schramme with fellow mercenaries Bob Denard and Jerry Puren (all three had fought for Tshombe in Katanga and the Congo) and involving approximately 100 former Katangan gendarmes and about 1,000 Katangese, the mutineers held their ground against the 32,000-man Armée Nationale Congolaise (ANC – the Congolese National Army) for four months.

On 4 November 1967, the ANC launched an all-out assault on the mercenaries' positions in Bukavu. After a day of fighting, Schramme, his mercenaries and the Katangans retreated towards the bridge crossing into Rwanda. The next morning the rearguard crossed the bridge. Schramme and his followers were disarmed and interned by the Rwandan authorities.

== Aftermath ==
In November 1967 President Joseph-Désiré Mobutu requested that the Rwandan government allow for the extradition of 119 mercenaries. The Rwandan government refused, citing resolutions passed by the Organization of African Unity. In response, Mobutu severed relations between the Congo and Rwanda on 11 January 1968. After several months of talks, the mercenaries departed from Rwanda on 24 April, and relations between Rwanda and the Congo resumed in early 1969.

== In popular culture ==
The Kisangani Mutinies are referenced in the hit single "Roland the Headless Thompson Gunner" by singer-songwriter Warren Zevon and former Congo mercenary David Lindell. It is also featured in the 1995 film Outbreak. Both the 1966 and 1967 mutinies are featured in the 2011 film Mister Bob.

== See also ==
- List of conflicts in the Democratic Republic of the Congo
- Joseph-Damien Tshatshi, killed during the 1966 mutiny
- Siege of Jadotville

== Works cited ==
- Nyrop, Richard F.; et al. (1969). Area Handbook for Rwanda. U.S. Government Printing Office.
