= Colonel Tshatshi Military Camp =

Military compound in the Democratic Republic of the Congo

Coordinates: 4.337043°S 15.232957°E

The Colonel Tshatshi Military Camp (French: Camp militaire "Colonel Tshatshi") is a military compound in Ngaliema, Kinshasa in the Democratic Republic of the Congo. It serves as the headquarters of the Armed Forces of the Democratic Republic of the Congo (FARDC) and hosts the defence department and the central command headquarters of the joint chiefs of staff. It surrounds two previous presidential palaces.

The camp is named in honour of Joseph-Damien Tshatshi, a military commander loyal to the regime of Joseph-Désiré Mobutu who was assassinated by rebels in July 1966 during the Kisangani mutiny.
