= December 2013 Kinshasa attacks =

Rioting by followers of Paul Joseph Mukungubila in DR Congo

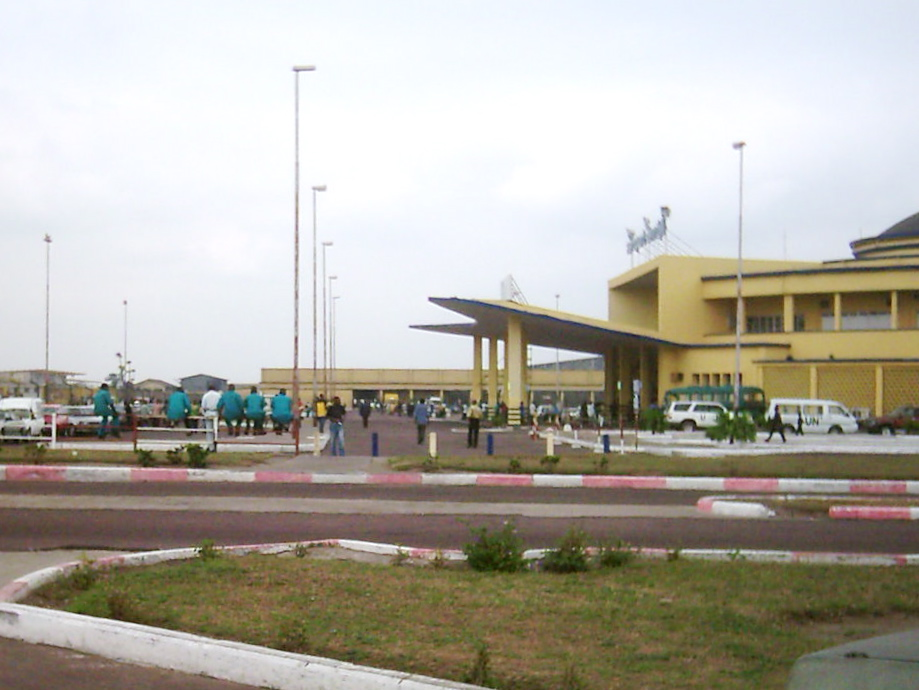
- N'djili Airport
Date	30 December 2013
Location	Kinshasa, Democratic Republic of Congo
Result	Government forces regain control of area

Belligerents
Supporters of Paul Joseph Mukungubila	(Democratic Republic of the Congo) DR Congo security forces: Republican Guard

Casualties and losses
54 killed, 100 arrested	One soldier killed, one UN worker wounded

Attacks in Kinshasa, the capital of the Democratic Republic of the Congo, were launched by supporters of religious leader Paul Joseph Mukungubila against television studios, the airport and a military base in the capital on 30 December 2013. The state security forces responded, killing around 54 of the attackers. An additional 47 of Mukungubila's supporters were killed in separate clashes in the cities of Lubumbashi and Kolwezi and around 100 people were arrested.

== Attacks ==
Attacks by men armed with knives were made against the state broadcaster's studios, N'Djili International Airport and the Colonel Tshatshi Military Camp from around 7.00am local time. Religious leader and former presidential candidate Paul Joseph Mukungubila claimed responsibility for the violence. An army colonel was killed during fighting at the military base but the information minister, Lambert Mende, claimed the government would preserve order "at any price" and stated that there was no chance of the attackers "maintain[ing] their positions, even for a single hour". Mende stated that 54 of the attackers had been killed. A Congolese civilian working for the United Nations' MONUSCO programme was injured by gunfire at the airport.

Mukungubila's men had forced two of the broadcaster's staff members to read a political statement critical of President Joseph Kabila on television. The statement said that "Gideon Mukungubila has come to free you from the slavery of the Rwandan", an apparent reference to the installation of Kabila's father as president by Rwandan-backed troops in a 1996–1997 rebellion. The government was able to shut down the broadcasts.

== Aftermath ==
Mukungubila denied he was launching a coup and stated the violence was in response to government harassment of his followers. In response to the attacks police and military checkpoints were set up throughout Kinshasa. A separate exchange of fire between security forces and gunmen in Lubumbashi in Katanga Province was initially said to be sparked by a disarmament programme and not related to the attacks in Kinshasa. However, later sources stated that the Lubumbashi engagement occurred when security forces assaulted a church linked to Mukungubila, killing 45 people. A number of arrests were made in Lubumbashi. One further person died in a related incident in Kolwezi.

Mai Mai rebels also seized the airport in Kindu, Maniema Province prior to being driven back by UN and government forces on the same day but it is not known if this was related to the events in Kinshasa. A warrant was issued by the Congolese government for the arrest of Mukungubila.
