= Gabriel Amisi Kumba =

Congolese military officer

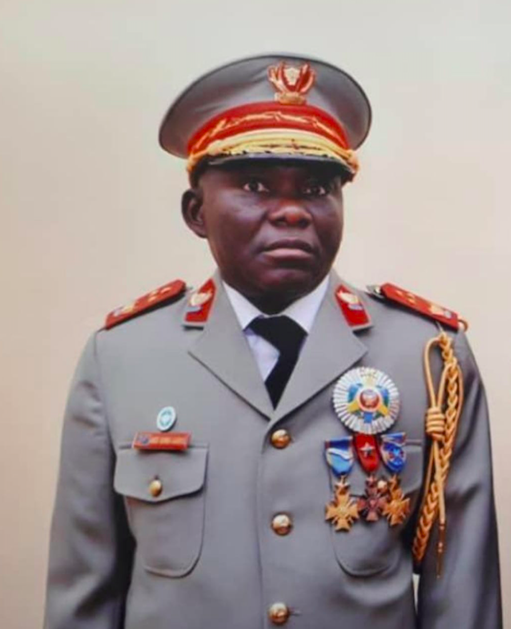
- Kumba in 2021
- Military career
- Allegiance: Democratic Republic of the Congo
- Branch: Land Forces
- Rank: Army general
- Commands: 8th Military Region (North Kivu); Land Forces
- Conflicts: Kisangani massacre Military operation in Kindu

Army General Gabriel Amisi Kumba (Tango Four) is a Congolese military officer.

== Career ==
Kumba was Chief of Staff of the Forces Terrestres, the army of the Democratic Republic of the Congo. Amisi was a former Forces armees Zairoises (FAZ) officer who was recruited into the Alliance of Democratic Forces for the Liberation of Congo (AFDL) in 1996. During the Second Congo War, Amisi was assistant chief of staff for logistics of the Rally for Congolese Democracy (RCD-G). This position was the origin of his nickname, as T-4 was the abbreviation for his position. He was implicated by Human Rights Watch in the execution of soldier Joe Lona Bifuko and in the torture of prisoners in the ANC military intelligence detention centre in Goma in 2001.

Amisi repressed of a mutiny in Kisangani in May 2002. Afterward, he commanded an ANC brigade based at Mbuji-Mayi. In September 2002, it allegedly took part in the executions of 82 civilians and Mayi-Mayi fighters in Kindu in a military operation together with the Rwandan Defence Forces.

Amisi was the former commander of the 8th Military Region in North Kivu, appointed in January 2005. In August 2006, it appears he was moved from command of the 8th Military Region to become chief of staff of the FARDC Land Forces (Forces Terrestre). There are credible allegations, some made by the BBC, that General Kumba personally profited from his position, benefiting from mining in the east of the country, during the past few years.

Many reports link Amisi to mining operations in North Kivu. In particular, he appears to have protected and profited from the operations of Colonel Samy Matumo, the former commander of the 85th Brigade that occupied the Bisie mine for several years. The report, written for the U.N. by the specialist Group of Experts on the DRC, said that Amisi oversaw a network providing arms and ammunition to criminal groups and rebels who roam the hills and forests of Congo's resource-rich but troubled east. According to the report, ammunition bought in neighboring Congo Brazzaville, is smuggled through the Congolese capital Kinshasa to the east by a close network of Amisi's associates, including members of his family.

On 22 November 2012, Amisi was suspended from his position in the Forces Terrestres by president Joseph Kabila due to his alleged role in the arms sales to rebel groups in the eastern part of the country, which may have implicated the rebel group M23.

In 2017, a UN report alleged that Amisi was mining gold on the Awimi River in Tshopo province, and that the management of La Conquete, a company he allegedly owns, were guarded by Congo’s military (FARDC).
