= Joseph-Damien Tshatshi =

Congolese military officer

- Born: 1927; Belgian Congo
- Died: 23 July 1966 (aged 38–39); Kisangani, Democratic Republic of the Congo
- Military career
- Allegiance: Belgian Congo (to 1960); Congo-Léopoldville (1960–66)
- Branch: Force Publique (to 1960); Armée Nationale Congolaise (1960–66)
- Rank: Lieutenant-Colonel
- Conflicts: Congo Crisis; Kisangani mutiny

Lieutenant-Colonel Joseph-Damien Tshatshi Djamba was a Congolese military officer who was assassinated by rebels at Kisangani on 23 July 1966 during the Kisangani mutiny.

Tshatshi began his military career in the Force Publique under Belgian colonial rule and later trained at the Officer Training School at Luluabourg (modern-day Kananga). He remained with the army after Congolese independence in 1960 in the re-formed Armée Nationale Congolaise (ANC). He remained loyal to the government at Léopoldville during the Congo Crisis and participated in the repression of the Katanga secession after 1963. He was nicknamed "the terrible" (le terrible). A loyalist to Joseph-Désiré Mobutu, he was a signatory to the proclamation of the Second Republic on 24 November 1965. At the time of his death, he commanded the 5th Mechanised Brigade (5^{e} Brigade mécanisée) and was serving as Republican Commissioner (commissaire de la République) for the Provinces of Haut-Congo, Kibali-Ituri, and Uélé.

Tshatshi was killed during an uprising among former Katangese soldiers near Kisangani on 23 July 1966. The mutiny was apparently sparked by rumours that the former Katangese leader Moïse Tshombe would return to the country from exile, and was only repressed by force in September.

In the aftermath of the killing, "Colonel Tshatshi" was celebrated as a hero by the Mobutu regime. A large military installation at Ngaliema in Léopoldville was renamed the Colonel Tshatshi Military Camp. Today the camp houses the command of the Armed Forces of the Democratic Republic of the Congo. In the same city, a major thoroughfare was renamed Boulevard Colonel Tshatshi in his honour. Le Grand Kallé dedicated his song "Paracommando" to Tshatshi's memory. In 1974 he was posthumously awarded the Order of the Companions of the Revolution by Mobutu.
