= Republican Guard (Democratic Republic of the Congo) =

Congolese Republican Guard
- Presidential Standard of the DRC
- Active: Current form: 2006
- Country: Democratic Republic of the Congo
- Allegiance: President of the Democratic Republic of the Congo
- Branch: Independent
- Type: Praetorian guard Republican guard
- Role: Security of the president
- Size: 10,000–15,000
- Headquarters: Kinshasa

Commanders
- Commander-in-chief: President Félix Tshisekedi

The Republican Guard (French: Garde Républicaine, GR), formerly known as the Special Presidential Security Group (Groupe Spécial de Sécurité Présidentielle, GSSP), is a praetorian guard unit maintained by and tasked to protect the Congolese president Félix Tshisekedi. Congolese military officials state that the Republican Guard is an independent branch and not the responsibility of FARDC, but the Head of State.

Apart from Article 140 of the Law on the Army and Defence, no legal stipulation on the DRC's Armed Forces makes provision for the GR as a distinct unit within the national army. In February 2005, President Joseph Kabila passed a decree that appointed the GR's commanding officer and 'repealed any previous provisions contrary to that decree.

The GR is more than 10,000 strong (the ICG said 10,000–15,000 in January 2007), and formerly consisted of three brigades, the 10th, at Kinshasa, the 15th, and the 16th, at Lubumbashi (more recently it has been reorganized into defense zones and regiments). It has better working conditions and is paid regularly, but still commits numerous crimes near their bases, including those perpetrated against United Nations officials.

It is said to be part of the Military Household (Maison Militaire) of the President, which is the DRC's state security agencies, and has been used against President Kabila's political opposition. The Republican Guard has been accused, by the United States, the United Nations, and numerous human rights groups of undermining the democratic process in the country by harassing political rivals, targeting opposition parties, abusing journalists, arbitrarily detaining and executing civilians, and preventing public gatherings.

== History ==
The Guard appears to be a functional successor to Mobutu's Special Presidential Division. Joseph Kabila's Special Presidential Security Group was renamed the Republican Guard in 2006. The Guard is organizationally distinct from the FARDC, and its members wear a recognizably different uniforms. Until 2007, they wore black uniforms. Today, they wear red berets to distinguish them from regular FARDC soldiers. General Bulenda Padiri described the Republican Guard in 2007 as a private army within the military and that most of its members came from President Kabila's home province of Katanga.

During the 2006–2007 election cycle in the DRC the Republican Guard was recorded by Amnesty International for extrajudicial killings and other abuses of Kinshasa residents during the political unrest.

In the next general election in 2011, the UN reported that Republican Guards, accompanied by the Congolese national police and intelligence agency, shot at protestors, killing 33 and wounding another 83. Another 265 were arrested, many reported that they were tortured. The UN stated it will work with the country's judiciary to investigate the incident and try those who were responsible. It was reported that Republican Guards opened fire at crowds of opposition members, who rallied near an airport where their leader was expected to be arriving. In the Katanga Province, it was reported that an attack on a polling station in Lubumbashi left several people dead who were caught in a fire fight between the assailants and Republican Guards. Also around that time, 30 people were arrested by the GR as around 60 tried to break into President Kabila's residence in Kinshasa. It was reported that some had military training, but the idea that they were angry Republican Guards was denied by the country's information minister. The GR fought them off successfully, though the fighting also spread to a nearby army base. Kabila called it a "coup attempt".

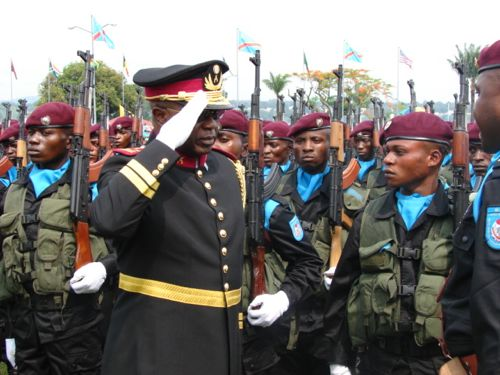
Members of the Republican Guard, wearing black uniforms and red berets, pictured with General Kisempia Sungilanga in 2006

On March 23–24, 2013, Guard troops fought off a rogue Mai Mai militia attack in the Katanga Province. The group, Mai Mai Kata Katanga, has been trying to establish the province as an independent state. The guardsmen in the area have been known to commit various crimes against the locals, and even some United Nations workers. During the December 2013 Kinshasa attacks members of the Republican Guard stationed in the capital fought off attacks by members of an extremist religious group. In March 2015, a court in the North Kivu region found a Republican Guard soldier guilty of murder and had him executed. It was also reported that 300 Republican Guards were deployed to the Central African Republic during the civil war in that country, around 2012–2013, to assist the falling government of President François Bozizé.

Throughout 2015 and 2016, Republican Guard troops were accused by various human rights organizations and media outlets of brutality towards protestors who were demonstrating against President Kabila not wanting to step down in November when his constitutionally-mandated term ended. In addition, they have arrested and harassed members of the Congolese opposition. The Republican Guard is legally unable to help the Congolese National Police (PNC) in maintaining public order, the police are only able to call on the Armed Forces. After the protests, in December 2016, the European Union placed sanctions on Republican Guard commander Ilunga Kampate and several other officials.

By 2017, an armored vehicle unit of the Republican Guard was deployed to Kasaï-Central province to assist the FARDC in putting down the Kamwina Nsapu rebellion. In February 2018 the Guard fought off a Mai Mai militia attack on one of the President Kabila's residences in the North Kivu provinces.

In early January 2019 it was reported that Republican Guard troops were deployed to help police deal with protestors in the aftermath of the 30 December 2018 general election. Since Félix Tshisekedi replaced Joseph Kabila as president of the DRC following the 2018 general election, Tshisekedi made an effort to reform the military, including regulating the role of the Republican Guard.

== Organization ==
Brigadier General Dieudonné Banze Lubundji was commander of the Republican Guard. He was appointed in 2007, and from 2003 to 2006 was FARDC deputy chief of staff for operations. By 2014, he was promoted to major general and given command of the Land Forces (Forces du Terrestres). The commander before him, Jean-Claude Kifwa, became commander of the 9th Military Region (Province Orientale). Ilunga Kampate was appointed Republican Guard commander during the September 2014 military command reshuffle, and was replaced in April 2020 by president Félix Tshisekedi with Christian Tshiwewe Songe.

In an effort to extend his personal control across the country, Joseph Kabila has deployed the GR at key airports, ostensibly in preparation for an impending presidential visit. At the end of 2005, there were Guards deployed in Mbandaka, Kindu, Lubumbashi, Bukavu, Kolwezi, staying many months after the President had left. They are still deployed at Kisangani's Bangoka airport, where they appear to answer to no local commander and have caused trouble with MONUC troops there.

The GR is also supposed to undergo the integration process, but as of January 2007, only one battalion had been announced as being integrated. Formed at a brassage centre in the Kinshasa suburb of Kibomango, the battalion included 800 men, half from the former GSSP and half from the MLC and RCD Goma.

By the summer of 2016, the GR has been reorganized from its original strength of three brigades into ten regiments. As of December 2016, the Republican Guard is organized as follows:

- Defense Zone 1 (Bas-Congo, Equateur, Kinshasa, Bandundu)
  - 10th Infantry Regiment (Mbanza-Ngungu) — Lt. Col. Utu Lukoyi
  - 11th Infantry Regiment (Kinshasa) — Lt. Col. Matata-Misimbo
  - 12th Infantry Regiment (Kinshasa) — Lt. Col. Kibanza wa Kibula
  - 14th Security and Honor Regiment (Kinshasa) — Col. Mpanga Mukutu
  - 15th GR Commando Regiment (Kinshasa) — Lt. Col. Inyengele Bakati Herickson
  - 15th Armored Regiment (Kinshasa, with detachments elsewhere) — Col. Steve Mikombe
  - 17th Artillery Regiment (Kinshasa, with detachments elsewhere) — Col. Abdullah Kayumba-Mwepu
- Defense Zone 2 (Kasai-Occidental, Kasai-Oriental, Katanga)
  - 13th Infantry Regiment (Lubumbashi) — Col. Etienne Monga Nonzo
  - 18th Infantry Regiment (Lubumbashi) — Lt. Col. Kabwe Ngoyi Tobololo
- Defense Zone 3 (Oriental, South Kivu, North Kivu, Maniema)
  - 19th Infantry Regiment (Goma) — Lt. Col. Yves Kitenge

== See also ==
- Republican guard

== Sources ==
- Henri Boshoff, The DDR Process in the DRC: a never-ending story, Institute for Security Studies, Pretoria, 2 July 2007
- Human Rights Watch (February 1999). "Casualties of War: Civilians, Rule of Law, and Democratic Freedoms". Human Rights Watch.
- International Crisis Group, Security Sector Reform in the Congo, Africa Report N°104, 13 February 2006
