= François Olenga =

Congolese military officer

Personal details
- Born: François Olenga Maniema Province
- Education: University of Paris
- Occupation: Military officer

Military service
- Allegiance: DR Congo
- Branch/service: Land Forces
- Years of service: 1996—2018
- Rank: Army general
- Commands: Chief of Staff of the Land Forces
- Battles/wars: Second Congo War; Kivu conflict M23 rebellion

François Olenga is an Army General of the Armed Forces of the Democratic Republic of the Congo (FARDC) and was one of its highest-ranking members along with Didier Etumba, the Chief of General Staff. He and Etumba both retired in July 2018, although they remain as military advisors to the head of state.

== Biography ==
He joined the AFDL in 1996, and was made chief of staff of the Congolese Land Forces in March 2001. Olenga was appointed Inspector-General of the FAC in July 2005. Promoted Lieutenant-General on 13 June 2007 and retained the position of FARDC Inspector-General. Suspended after an assassination at his residence in April 2008. In June 2012, he was appointed as Chief of Staff of Land Forces. He was promoted to army general by 2014 and was replaced as Land Forces chief of staff, becoming the head of President Joseph Kabila's "Maison Militaire" (Military Household).

After two years as commander of land forces, Olenga was instead appointed as head of the Military Household of President Joseph Kabila in September 2014. Having a family connection to revolutionary leader Patrice Lubumba, he is regarded as one of the nationalistic and patriotic generals of the FARDC, and is credited with the successful offensive against the M23 rebellion in 2013 that ended in a government victory. Olenga also threatened to personally execute traitors. For these reasons, Olenga was very popular with the troops under his command.

In 2017 Olenga was sanctioned by the United States for human rights violations, as part of U.S. pressure on President Kabila to step down make sure the overdue general elections are held. In July 2018, Olenga retired from the military, but has the status of advisor to the President.
