= Mister Bob =

- Directed by: Thomas Vincent
- Produced by: Ariel Askénazit; Genevieve Hofmeyr; Bénédicte Lesage
- Cinematography: Dominique Bouilleret
- Edited by: Mike Fromentin
- Music by: Murray Anderson
- Distributed by: Canal+
- Release date: 3 October 2011
- Running time: 101 minutes
- Country: France
- Languages: French; English

Mister Bob is a 2011 French drama film directed and co-scripted by Thomas Vincent.

== Plot ==
The film follows the exploits of the French mercenary Bob Denard in the Congo between 1964 and 1967. The story begins in July 1967 with Denard who has just staged a rebellion against President Joseph-Désiré Mobutu of the Congo giving a rousing speech to his mercenaries while looking worried when he reads a message from Paris. Denard and his men are engaged in heavy fighting against the Armée Nationale Congolaise and Denard is wounded.

In a delirious state, Denard flash-backs to 1964 when he was hired by the French intelligence service, the Service de Documentation Extérieure et de Contre-Espionnage (SDECE), to go to the Congo to fight for the pro-Western Premier Moïse Tshombe, who has just lost control of the entire eastern half of the Congo to the left-wing Simba rebellion supported by Cuba and China. Denard is bored with civilian life in Paris, and embraces the chance to go to Congo to have some adventure. There is much distrust between the members of the Katangese Gendarmerie who have returned from exile with Tshombe and their former enemies in the Armée Nationale Congolaise led by Mobutu who are uneasily fighting together against the Simbas. Denard and his mercenaries defeat the Simbas while being greatly resented by general Mobutu who knows that the decision to hire European mercenaries is an adverse comment upon his military competence. The Simbas have committed terrible atrocities and Denard and his mercenaries find scenes of carnage everywhere they go, being greeted with quiet relief.

Denard marries a Congolese nurse, Marie-Elise, whom he has rescued from the Simbas. Denard chooses to stay in the Congo after the Simba revolt is put down, and earns the respect though not the trust of Mobutu after he tells him that he wants to train the Armée Nationale Congolaise up to European standards. Denard is both fascinated with and repulsed by Mobutu, a man of great charisma and charm who is utterly ruthless and amoral. Denard finds himself caught in a conflict between the followers of Tshombe and Mobutu, which to a certain extent is also a proxy struggle between the SDECE which supports Tshombe and the CIA which supports Mobutu.

In November 1965, Mobutu takes power in a coup. In July 1966, the former members of the Katangese Gendarmerie led by Colonel Sango revolt against Mobutu while Denard tries to stay neutral. After the mutiny is put down, Mobutu has Sango and the other mutineers gruesomely executed. A SDECE agent tells Denard that Paris has decided that Mobutu is a liability for French interests because of his plans to nationalise the assets of the European-owned Union Minière company and the French are planning to restore Tshombe. Denard has an uneasy relationship with Mobutu, which worsens when he learns that Mobutu takes it as his right to sleep with the wives of his officers, being informed that this is an old custom of the Ngbandi kings that Mobutu has revived. Mobutu's insistence that he be allowed to have sex with Marie-Elise reflects his increasing megalomania and sultanistic tendencies as he insists that everything and everyone in the Congo belongs to him. At a party, Denard pulls Marie-Elise away from Mobutu as he leads her towards his bedroom to the rage of the president.

Eventually, Denard together with the Belgian mercenary/planter Jean Schramme discover that Mobutu is planning their executions and decide to revolt to restore Tshombe with a promise of support from the governments of France and Belgium. Denard launches his revolt in 1967 and then learns the French and Belgians have withdrawn their support at the last minute owing to American objections, leaving him to face the Armée Nationale Congolaise alone. Denard fights on, but his men are defeated as the promised supplies of ammunition failed to arrive. Denard and his mercenaries are forced to retreat into Rwanda. As the film ends, Denard observes that there will be more wars in Africa and hence more work for men like him.

== Production ==
The film was shot in South Africa in the fall of 2010.

== Cast ==
- Clovis Cornillac as Bob Denard
- Marc Zinga as General Mobutu Sese Seko
- Christophe Vandevelde as Lieutenant Rossi
- Dan Herzberg as Lieutenant Fourier
- Pascal N'Zonzi as Premier Moïse Tshombe
- Richard Lukunku as Lieutenant Oka
- Lawrence Joffe as CIA agent
- David Dukas as CIA agent
- Leigh Bremridge as the first wife of Bob Denard
- Hubert Koundé as Colonel Sango
- Jacques Combault as sergeant
- Rosalind Jacobs as Mother Superior
- Mélodie Abud as nun
- Thomas Vincent as the survivor
- Gaëtan Schmidt as doctor
- Danny Keogh as Walker Van Dijk
- Arnold Kapend as messenger for Tshombe
- Zikhona Sodlaka as the girl with the gun
- Adam Neil as Jean de Bruxelles
- Gina Haller as Marie-Elise
- Aladin Reibel as Jean Schramme
- Olivier Rabourdin as SDECE agent
- François Loriquet as SDECE agent
- Maëva Pasquali as the mistress of Bob Denard

== Reception ==
Cornillac won the Best Actor at the 2011 Festival de Fiction in La Rochelle for his performance in Mister Bob while Vincent won the Best Director award at the same film festival. The French critic Guillaume Fraissard praised the film, writing: "The difficulty of this kind of telefilms, inspired by real events, is to manage to draw an impassable line between hagiography and historical narrative. Mister Bob achieves this thanks to his [Vincent's] scriptwriting skill, his flashback construction and the choice of the lesser known period of the mercenary".

The French critic Marie Lebon praised the film for showing the different sides of Denard, writing: "Very versatile, Robert Denard represents the hidden face of France after decolonization, pulling strings to preserve his interests, without really caring about the populations subjected to the violence of the roughnecks. His choices are dictated by contradictory impulses and his allegiance to the French secret service. A soldier in need of recognition, manipulator or manipulated? It is all in the art of Clovis Cornillac to have been able to render on the screen the figure of this soldier of fortune".

The French critic Isabelle Hanne gave the film a positive review, praising Zinga's performance as Mobutu, writing he "brilliantly embodies this Shakespearian and bloodthirsty figure." Hanne wrote: "So is Denard a coward? Played by a superb and moustachioed Clovis Cornillac, the character is all rough: in love but an executioner, an adventurer but not political, a brave military leader and respected by his men, but humiliated by the pundits of French intelligence. So was Denard manipulated? The skill of the screenplay, co-written by one of Denard's sons, is to show a man torn between his convictions and his common military sense, his ideas and his career plan. Above all, the film places him at the heart of a story whose strings he does not pull."
