= Military Academy of Kananga =

Officer Training School in Kananga, DRC

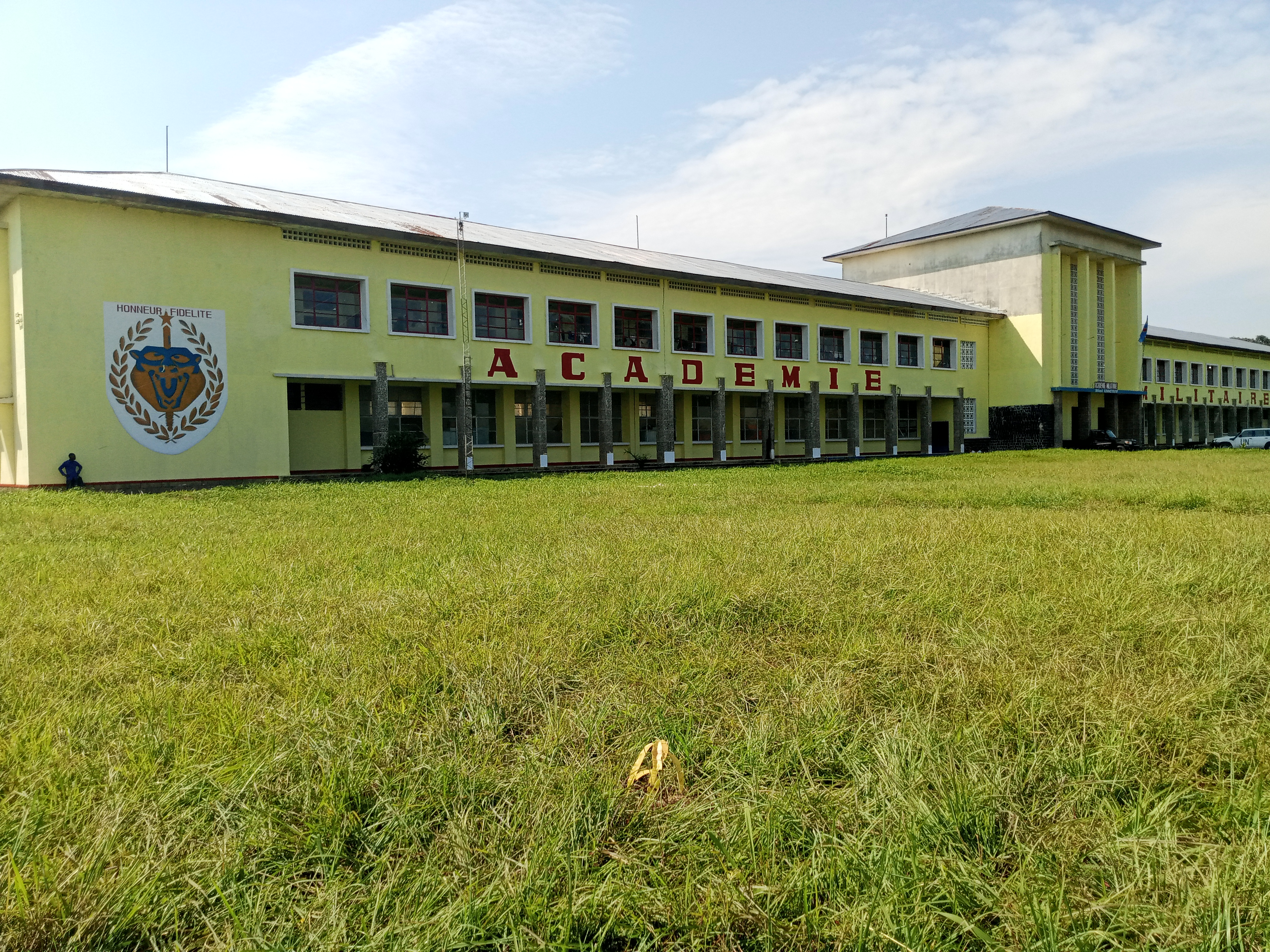
Front of the Military Academy

The Military Academy of Kananga (French: Académie militaire de Kananga), also called the Officer Training School (French: Ecole de formation d'officiers) is the military officer training school for the Armed Forces of the Democratic Republic of the Congo (FARDC) and previously of Zaire, located in Kananga.

It was closed in 1990 after Belgium ended its military cooperation with Zaire, and was reopened in 2011 with European Union assistance. Cadets train for three years at the academy before being sent off to a military specialisation training center. Officers from other African countries also serve as instructors there.

== Notable graduates ==
- Joseph Damien Tshatshi, soldier and revolutionary
- Baudoin Liwanga Mata, admiral and former Chief of General Staff
