= Conscription in the Democratic Republic of the Congo =

Conscription in the Democratic Republic of the Congo is legal according to provisions in the current Constitution of the DRC, and formerly the Constitution of Zaire adopted in 1964. Although mandatory military service is not in effect in the DRC currently, many rebel groups and the Armed Forces have forced youths into service, including child soldiers.

== Legal basis ==
In Article 63 of the Constitution of the Democratic Republic of the Congo, it states that "All Congolese have the sacred right and duty to defend the country and its territorial integrity in the face of an external threat or aggression" and that "a compulsory military service may be established under the conditions prescribed by law." Previously, under the government of Mobutu Sese Seko, Article 30 of the Constitution of Zaire stated "All Zairians who become 18 are liable for military service; this may be replaced by a civilian service on conditions set out by law."

== History ==
The Mobutu regime made no attempt to enforce compulsory service. In March 1998, a national service center was established with about 300 instructors training 2,000 youths. The government of President Laurent Kabila planned to set 33 centers to train as many as 50,000 people. This was part of an effort to integrate former militias into a national army. Apparently Kabila planned on introducing national service for all citizens and creating a national army of 600,000 troops, although they had no way of paying such a large number. Unofficially, many youths were press-ganged and forced into service, by either the Armed Forces of DR Congo (FARDC) or by various armed militant groups throughout the country. Kabila's ADFL had drafted as many as 10,000 child soldiers during the First Congo War.

== See also ==
- Child soldiers in the Democratic Republic of the Congo
