= Operation Violettes Imperiales =

Offensive in the Congo Crisis

Operation White Giant
- Part of the Simba rebellion during the Congo Crisis
- Map of operations during the Operation Violettes Imperiales
Date	c. 29 May – 15 June 1965 (2 weeks and 3 days)
Location	Northern Orientale Province
Result	Democratic Republic of the Congo victory

Belligerents
Democratic Republic of the Congo	Simba rebels

Commanders and leaders
(Democratic Republic of the Congo) Jacques Noel (Democratic Republic of the Congo) Mike Hoare (Democratic Republic of the Congo) Bob Denard	Unknown

Units involved
Armée Nationale Congolaise (ANC): 5 Commando; 6 Commando; Premier Choc	Unknown

Operation Violettes Imperiales (May–June 1965) was a military offensive conducted by the forces of the Democratic Republic of the Congo in northern Orientale Province against insurgents during the Simba rebellion. The operation succeeded in its aims, retaking the towns of Buta and Bondo as well as cutting rebel supply routes to the Central African Republic.

== Background ==
Following its independence in 1960, the Republic of the Congo became the subject to a series of political upheavals and conflicts collectively termed the "Congo Crisis". In 1964, insurgents called "Simbas" launched a major rebellion in the eastern regions, inflicting heavy losses on the Armée Nationale Congolaise (ANC), the national military. Several foreign states, including Cuba, used neighboring states to funnel aid to the Simba insurgents. President Joseph Kasa-Vubu appointed Moïse Tshombe new Prime Minister to solve the crisis. Tshombe had previously led the separatist State of Katanga, whose military had consisted of the Katangese Gendarmerie and supportive mercenaries.

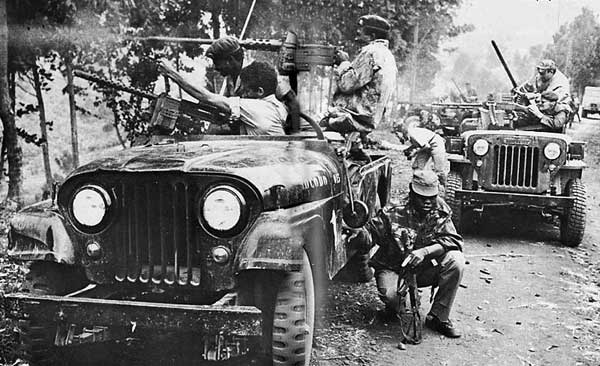
ANC soldiers, including black and white mercenaries, in combat with Simba rebels.

After negotiations with the Simbas failed, Tshombe recruited a large number of ex-gendarmes and mercenaries to bolster the ANC. These troops were led by Mike Hoare and organized as units termed "Commandos", relying on speed and firepower to outgun and outmaneuver the insurgents. The restrengthened security forces were able to halt the Simbas' advance. In late 1964, the Congolese government and its allies, including Belgium and the United States, organized a major counter-offensive against the Simba rebels. This campaign resulted in the recapturing of several settlements in northeastern Congo, most importantly Stanleyville. The mercenaries played a major role in the offensive, bolstering their reputation and causing Tshombe to extend their contracts as well as enlist more of them.

In January 1965, Hoare was promoted to lieutenant colonel by General Joseph-Desiré Mobutu, chief of staff of the ANC. The mercenary leader was also tasked to retake the region west of Lake Albert. For this purpose, he was given command of a military zone termed "Operation North-East" in Orientale Province. Hoare subsequently organized a successful offensive termed "Operation White Giant", retaking the areas bordering Sudan and Uganda. This cut important rebel supply lines. Hoping to exploit this success, Lieutenant Colonel Jacques Noel, chief of staff for ANC's 3 Group, worked out a plan for another offensive code-named "Operation Violettes Imperiales". This campaign was supposed to retake Buta and Bondo, towns in northern Orientale Province used by the rebels as hubs for supplies coming from the Central African Republic, and, to a lesser degree, Sudan. Regular ANC troops, 5 Commando, and 6 Commando, were assigned to the operation.

== Operation ==
Orientale Province (red) within the Democratic Republic of the Congo.

Operation Violettes Imperiales was initiated on 29 May or around 30 May 1965. The government troops operated in two contingents. One force, headed directly by Hoare, consisted of 110 members of 5 Commando, an ANC bridging unit, mortars, and two Ferret armoured cars. Starting at Faradje, it quickly advanced toward Bondo, breaking through sporadic rebel defenses. After crossing the Bomokandi River, the group entered Bili, discovering that the town was abandoned. However, the security forces realized that the local rebel garrison had retreated with two Norwegian missionaries as hostages. In response, 5 Commando organized an ambush nearby, successfully luring the rebels into it and inflicting heavy losses. The Norwegian missionaries were rescued. Shortly after, the rebels launched a final counter-attack at Bili, killing one mercenary. Bili was subsequently secured by the government troops.

Hoare's contingent then continued its journey to Bondo. It arrived at the town at night, and unsure about the strength of the local garrison, waited until the next day to attack. By this point, the rebels had retreated with several hostages; only two European hostages were freed at the location. Meanwhile, the second government force under Bob Denard, including 6 Commando and the Premier Choc unit, had moved from Paulis toward Poko and Buta. It quickly captured Poko. As Denard's men were approaching Buta, however, Noel contacted Hoare's force and ordered it to abandon Bondo to support the attack on Buta. On the way, Hoare's troops had to move through Likati, a town with a significant White population of Greek and Portuguese traders. Before the security forces entered Likati, the local Simba rebels massacred the local Whites with the exception of one woman. In revenge, Hoare's men murdered 15 rebels who had been captured at Bondo and proceeded to "kill everything that moves" along the remaining way to Buta.

At 10:00 on 3 June, Hoare's contingent reached Buta, followed by Denard's force one hour later. The rebels had left the town, but previously murdered at least 38 priests and threw their bodies into the nearby Rubi River. Only 5 White hostages were discovered alive at Buta. Afterward, the government troops fully secured the captured towns and prepared the restoration of the civil administration. The operation was concluded by mid-June 1965. (Note: According to researcher Frank Villafana, government forces took Niangara in June as part of Operation Violettes Imperiales. In contrast, researchers Andrew Hudson as well as Anthony Rogers state that the town was already under government control at this point, with 5 Commando's headquarters being based there during Operation Violettes Imperiales.)

== Aftermath ==
Operations White Giant and Violettes Imperiales left most of Orientale Province under government control. Tshombe and Mobutu subsequently focused their forces' efforts on capturing the remaining Simba strongholds, most importantly at Fizi-Baraka in Kivu. This area was targeted by Operation South from September 1965.
