= Operation White Giant =

Offensive in the Congo Crisis

- Part of the Simba rebellion during the Congo Crisis
- Map of operations during the Operation White Giant
Date	15 March – 29 May 1965 (2 months and 2 weeks)
Location	Northeastern Orientale Province
Result	Democratic Republic of the Congo victory

Belligerents
Democratic Republic of the Congo; United States	Simba rebels Uganda; Cuba; Supported by: Sudan; Egypt

Commanders and leaders
Mike Hoare; John Peters; Alastair Wicks; Christian Tavernier	"Gombe"

Units involved
Armée Nationale Congolaise (ANC): 5 Commando; 14 Commando; "Force John-John"; CIA: "Makasi"	Unidentified Simba units Uganda Army; Cuban advisors

Strength
c. 970	1,200+

Operation White Giant (March–April 1965) was a military offensive conducted by the forces of the Democratic Republic of the Congo and its allies to retake northeastern Orientale Province from insurgents during the Simba rebellion. The operation succeeded in its aims, cutting off the Simba rebels from supply by their allies in Uganda and Sudan.

== Background ==
Following its independence in 1960, the Republic of the Congo became the subject to a series of political upheavals and conflicts collectively termed the "Congo Crisis". In 1964, insurgents called "Simbas" launched a major rebellion in the eastern regions, inflicting heavy losses on the Armée Nationale Congolaise (ANC), the national military. President Joseph Kasa-Vubu appointed Moïse Tshombe new Prime Minister to solve the crisis. Tshombe had previously led the separatist State of Katanga, whose military had consisted of the Katangese Gendarmerie and supportive mercenaries.

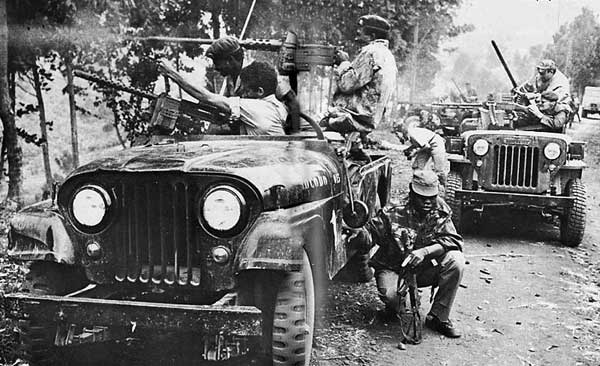
ANC soldiers, including black and white mercenaries, in combat with Simba rebels.

After negotiations with the Simbas failed, Tshombe recruited a large number of ex-gendarmes and mercenaries to bolster the ANC. These troops were led by Mike Hoare and organized as units termed "Commandos", relying on speed and firepower to outgun and outmaneuver the insurgents. The restrengthened security forces were able to halt the Simbas' advance. In late 1964, the Congolese government and its allies, including Belgium and the United States, organized a major counter-offensive against the Simba rebels. This campaign resulted in the recapturing of several settlements in northeastern Congo, most importantly Stanleyville. The mercenaries played a major role in the offensive, bolstering their reputation and causing Tshombe to extend their contracts as well as enlist more of them.

In January 1965, Hoare was promoted to lieutenant colonel by General Joseph-Desiré Mobutu, chief of staff of the ANC. The mercenary leader was also tasked to retake the region west of Lake Albert. For this purpose, he was given command of a military zone termed "Operation North-East" in Orientale Province. Hoare, assisted by two other mercenary commanders, namely Captain John Peters and Major Alastair Wicks, subsequently worked out a plan for an offensive code-named "White Giant". (Note: The mercenaries were locally nicknamed "white giants".) The operation would start from Bunia, a city which was on Lake Albert's shore and still government-held. About 970 soldiers were assigned to the campaign, equipped with Ferret armoured cars and mortars. Hoare's contingent also enjoyed covert support by the United States' CIA, including Cuban exiles who piloted military aircraft and were collectively called "Makasi".

Operation White Giant's overall aim was to sever the Simbas' foreign supply lines from Uganda and Sudan. Several foreign states, including Cuba, used these two states to funnel aid to the Simba insurgents. A Communist Afro-Cuban, nom-de-guerre "Gombe", allegedly even commanded the Simba forces in the border region.

== Operation ==
Orientale Province (red) within the Democratic Republic of the Congo.

On 15 March 1965, the ANC's 5 Commando initiated Operation White Giant with the smaller "Operation Kingfisher". In this initial push, 58–59 mercenaries led by Roy Larsen captured Mahagi's port in a seaborne attack using fishing vessels on Lake Albert. Meanwhile, the remaining government troops ("Force Whisky") attacked Mahagi from the land, taking Nioka on the way. Despite significant rebel resistance, "Force Whisky" captured Mahagi and reinforced Larsen's troops before they were overwhelmed. However, the ANC soldiers were quickly attacked by nearby Uganda Army soldiers. Amid these clashes, about 200 rebels escaped to Uganda.

Afterward, the government troops began to advance from Nioka-Ngote toward Aru, Aba, and Faradje. These border settlements served as major rebel hubs for supply and reinforcements. In this push, the government forces organized into three columns: 5 Commando in the center, 14 Commando (mostly Katangese) under Christian Tavernier at the left flank and "Force John-John" under Peters at the right flank. About 100 pro-ANC locals were enlisted as guides. First, the three columns attacked Golu; after overwhelming some Simba forward defenses, the town was secured with little effort. Hoare then sent troops under Major Wicks and Captain Peters to capture Djalasiga and Kerekere respectively, a task both accomplished.

Afterward, 14 Commando overran Aru, destroying the local bridge to Uganda. Rebel weaponry and documents captured by the government forces at Aru confirmed that the local insurgents were supplied by the Uganda Army in exchange for gold from regional mines. They also found guns of Chinese manufacture. Next, "Force John-John" struck at Aba. The latter location, despite hosting a rebel headquarters, was abandoned by the Simbas without a fight. The government troops secured abandoned weaponry at Aba, and discovered evidence that Sudanese and Egyptian advisors had previously been present at the insurgent headquarters. Hoare's troops went on to pursue the rebels across the border into Sudan, eliminating the local rebel "sanctuary". The Sudanese government, having grown weary of the Simba presence on its territory, did not protest this border violation. Upon returning to Congo, Hoare ordered the destruction of a bridge linking Aba to Sudan on 11 May. He then sent Wicks' forces and 14 Commando to capture Faradje. Thus, within a few days, the government troops had cut the important northeastern supply routes of the insurgents.

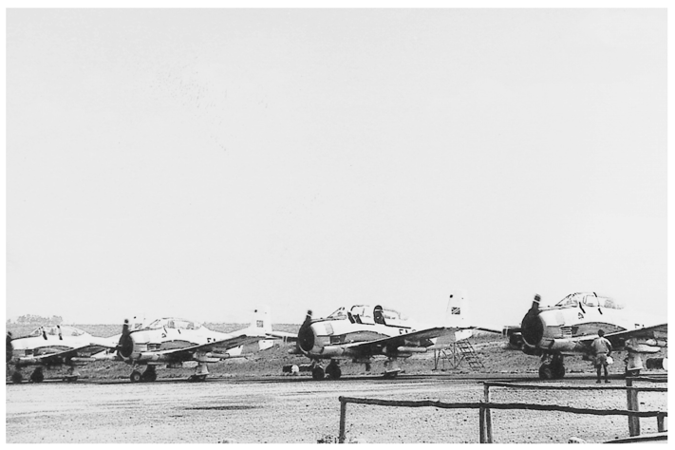
CIA T-28 aircraft (pictured at Bunia airfield) supported the attack on Watsa.

At this point, Operation White Giant's second phase began, targeted at retaking the remaining major towns of northeastern Orientale Province. On 24 May, Hoare's forces proceeded to capture Dungu, supported by "Makasi" forces. (Note: Based on the accounts of Hoare and other mercenaries, researcher Anthony Rogers stated that the government forces first attacked Watsa, followed by Dungu and Niangara. In contrast, Frank Villafana referred to the flight log of Cuban exile and CIA pilot Luis Fernández Ardois-Anduz, according to whom the government troops captured Dungu before Watsa.) Niangara possibly fell to the government forces around the same time. (Note: According to Villafana, government forces took Niangara in June as part of Operation Violettes Imperiales.) The government forces then advanced on Watsa, where important gold mines were located. To strike at Watsa, however, the government forces had to cross a Simba-held bridge across the Kibali River. The local insurgent garrison contained about 1,200 militants. To ease the advance, Hoare asked the "Makasi" for CIA air support. The CIA responded by sending four T-28 and two B-26K to bomb both the bridge as well as the town, causing the insurgents to flee. (Note: Villafana claims that at least one CIA aircraft was shot down during Operation White Giant, with its pilot, Fausto I. Gómez, killed in action. However, Gómez was killed on 17 December 1964, months before Operation White Giant's start.) The government troops stormed Watsa on 29 May. After retaking Watsa, the security forces murdered 50 to 60 captured Simbas in revenge for a massacre committed by the rebels in the town in the previous November. Operation White Giant was thus concluded after seven weeks of combat.

== Aftermath ==
Operation White Giant had succeeded in closing the major rebel supply routes in the northeast, though a significant rebel presence remained in the area. Simba insurgents launched a number of counter-attacks in the area over the next weeks, though they failed to recapture any large settlements. The next government offensive, termed Operation Violettes Imperiales, was launched on 29 May 1965. Operation White Giant was one of the key campaigns of 1965 which effectively broke the Simba rebels' resistance, despite the persistence of scattered insurgent forces after 1965.
