= Mercenaries and the Democratic Republic of the Congo =

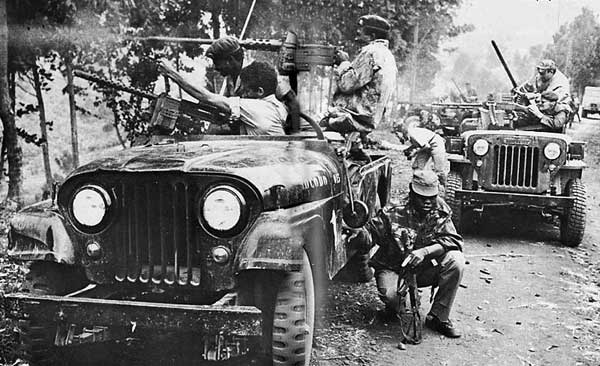
White mercenaries fighting alongside Congolese troops in 1964

Following the Democratic Republic of the Congo's independence in 1960, mercenaries from Europe, North America, and Southern Africa have been recruited to participate in various military conflicts within the country.

== Background ==
After the World Wars, the tradition of mercenary work was revived. This was helped by the decolonization of Africa. In the young African republics, the old colonial system was destroyed, armies were in the process of being created, internal conflicts began. The governments of the countries were looking for professional military personnel with combat experience.

== Legacy ==
In the 1960s, mercenaries in Africa were able to influence conflicts in favor of the governments employing them. These mercenary companies' experience was influential in the Angolan Civil War.

The careers of many famous mercenaries of the 20th century began in the Congo. Modern ideas and stereotypes about mercenaries have been formed there.

== History ==
=== 1960s ===
The Congo Crisis (1960–1965) was a period of turmoil in the First Republic of the Congo, one which began with independence from Belgium and ended when Joseph Mobutu seized power. Various factions employed mercenaries during this period, at times assisting the United Nations and other peacekeepers.

In 1960 and 1961, Mike Hoare worked as a mercenary commanding the English-speaking unit "4 Commando," which supported the breakaway state of Katanga under the leadership of Moïse Tshombe. Hoare chronicled his time in the country in his book The Road to Kalamata.

In 1964, then-Prime Minister of Congo Tshombe hired Major Hoare to lead a military unit called "5 Commando" made up of about 300 men, most of them from South Africa. The unit's mission was to fight a rebel group called Simbas, who already had captured almost two-thirds of the country.

In Operation Dragon Rouge, "5 Commando" worked in close cooperation with Belgian paratroopers, Cuban exile pilots, and CIA-hired mercenaries. The objective of Operation Dragon Rouge was to capture Stanleyville and save several hundred civilians (mostly Europeans and missionaries) who were hostages of the Simba rebels. The operation saved many lives; however, it damaged the reputation of Tshombe as it saw the return of white mercenaries to the Congo soon after independence. This was a factor in Tshombe's loss of support from President of Congo Joseph Kasa-Vubu, who later dismissed him from his position.

During this period, Bob Denard commanded the French-speaking "6 Commando." "Black Jack" Schramme commanded "10 Commando," and William "Rip" Robertson commanded a company of anti-Castro Cuban exiles.

Later, in 1966 and 1967, a group of former Tshombe mercenaries and Katangese gendarmes staged the Stanleyville mutinies (also known as the "Mercenaries' mutinies").

=== 1990s ===
In November—December 1996, with the direct participation of the French special services, the White Legion unit was formed. It was headed by Belgian Christian Tavernier. The formation joined the army of the Mobutu Sese Seko regime.

=== 21st century ===
Since 2000, hired pilots from the former USSR have piloted Congolese Su-25s. Two planes with Ukrainian Mokratov (June 2007) and Belarusian Likhotkin (December 2006) were lost.

In January 2017, Tutsi rebels shot down two Mi-24 helicopters with Georgian and Belarusian crews.

== In popular culture ==
The 1966 Italian Mondo film Africa Addio documents a group of white mercenaries in the Congo fighting alongside the Congolese Army. In the film, the white mercenaries liberate the town of Boende in October 1964 from the Simba rebels. The film showed the execution of a Simba rebel by a white mercenary, which resulted in the film being temporarily seized by the Italian police. Its director, Gaultiero Jacopetti, was questioned by police on suspicion of producing a snuff film but was exonerated.
