= Louis Bidalira =

Congolese rebel

- Born: Luberizi, Belgian Congo
- Died: August/September 2001; Eastern Democratic Republic of the Congo
- Military career
- Allegiance: Armée Populaire de Libération (Simba rebels); Mai-Mai network of Uvira Territory
- Service years: 1964–1966; 1998–2001
- Rank: General
- Nickname: "Bitolero"
- Commands: APL's 1st Brigade; Mai-Mai-Bidalira
- Conflicts: Congo Crisis; Simba rebellion; First Congo War; Second Congo War

Louis Bidalira (died August/September 2001) was a Congolese rebel leader. A member of the Fuliru people, he joined the Simba rebellion of the 1960s and rose to lead one of the insurgents' units in South Kivu. Like many other regional rebel officers, he became an autonomous warlord and spent much energy quarreling with rival insurgents instead of fighting the Congolese government. After the Simba main armies were defeated in 1965, Bidalira initially continued to lead one of the rebel holdouts and was chosen as the Simba remnants' chief commander. He fled into exile in 1966, and his remaining forces were subsequently destroyed or absorbed by rival rebel groups. Afterward, Bidalira continued to be active in the militant Congolese opposition. He reemerged as a leader of a Mai-Mai militia in the First and Second Congo Wars, and was eventually killed in battle.

== Biography ==
=== Early life and rise among the Simba rebels ===
Bidalira was born at the village of Luberizi, Belgian Congo, into the muTumba clan of the Fuliru people. The muTumba was considered to be the most numerous clan within this ethnic group. (Note: Political scientist René Lemarchand described Bidalira as a Rwandan exile alongside other members of the Inyenzi movement, a description later also used by other researchers. The reason for this characterization is unclear.) He initially worked as an agent of an agricultural cooperative. At one point, he joined the Congolese National Movement-Lumumba (Mouvement National Congolais-Lumumba, MNC-L) party. In September 1963, Bidalira attended a covert meeting of MNC-L and CEREA members at Manda, a small village near Luvungi, where the gathered individuals agreed to form a "cartel" to oppose Congolese President Joseph Kasa-Vubu. Within this cartel, Bidalira was appointed as information director. The cartel also decided to send him to Burundi where he was supposed to establish contacts with another opposition leader, Gaston Soumialot. This would result in a lasting cooperation between the two men.

By 1964, Bidalira had become part of the Conseil National de Libération (CNL, "National Liberation Council"), a militant group partially recruited from radical MNC-L members who sought to overthrow the Congolese government. The CNL regarded the Léopoldville government as a "neo-colonial" regime which had "sold the Congo to the Americans" and would be overthrown as part of an armed revolution. Bidalira was promoted to the rank of colonel in the CNL's armed wing, the Armée Populaire de Libération (APL, better known as the "Simbas"), and assumed the alias "Bitolero". He began to recruit Fuliru for the emerging rebel movement. Alongside Major Évariste Rumonghet, Bidalira gathered and trained a substantial rebel force in camps located in the hills west of the Bukavu-Uvira road; part of this force were militias headed by provincial deputy Marandura Musa,and his son, Antoine Marandura. The trainees were initially mainly limited to traditional weaponry such as spears and knives, as few guns were available to the insurgents. Bidalira was responsible for bringing some modern weaponry to the Manda training camp, purchased by Soumialot in Burundi; at the time, he was also accompanied by a witch doctor, Paul Mwamba, who sought to motivate the trainees by applying protective rituals.

On 15 April 1964, the CNL launched invasions and rebellions in the Kivu region of the eastern Congo. Bidalira and Marandura Musa headed one of these operations which was centered on the Ruzizi Plain, which was mainly inhabited by Fuliru and Vira people. They overran the Luvungi, Luberizi, as well as Mulenge groupings and attacked the Kiliba and Lemera posts of the Congoloese military (ANC). On 21 April, Bidalira was made a member of the "Upper Council of the Revolution (Conseil Superier de la Revolution, CSR), the rebel high command.

=== Warlord in eastern Congo and fall from power ===
"I want the liberation of all my people. The voice of the people is the voice of God, and we pray that God will punish the Americans and their imperialist lackeys. We have only our spears and knives against the planes, but we will fight to the death. Homeland or death."

— Louis Bidalira, speech to his officers (Note: Translated from French. In the original, this reads: "Je veux la libération de tout mon peuple. La voix du peuple est la voix de Dieu et nous prions pour que Dieu punisse les Américains et leurs valets impérialistes. Nous n'avons que nos lances et nos couteaux contre les avions, mais nous combattrons jusqu'à la mort. La patrie ou la mort.")

Bidalira personally led 300 rebels to Uvira on 15 May, storming the city on 16–17 May. His forces captured 100 ANC soldiers of whom 30 were executed, while the remaining garrison fled. The Simbas subjected Uvira to a manhunt, seeking out policemen, civil servants, and military personnel whom they deemed collaborators of the "Ancien régime". About 100 people were killed without trial by Bidalira's forces. Afterward, he became the Simba rebels' main military leader in Uvira, controlling a territory from Makobola to Kigongo in Uvira Territory. Bidalira mainly commanded troops of Fuliru ethnicity and styled himself as the first "general" of the Fuliru. Like many regional officers, Bidalira nominally recognized the authority of higher-ranking Simba leaders such as Soumialot, Christophe Gbenye, and Nicholas Olenga, but factually operated as an autonomous warlord. Over time, he developed a rivalry with Marandura Musa, as the latter belonged to the Fuliru's muShimbi clan which had traditionally regarded itself as the ethnic group's most powerful clan. He and his troops also became opposed to Simba forces of Bembe ethnicity, led by Shabani Ndalo.

By March 1965, Bidalira was commander of the 1st Brigade in Kigoma. When Communist Cubans under Che Guevara arrived to aid the Congolese rebels in April 1965, Bidalira attended a meeting of Simba commanders who were suspicious of these newly arrived foreigners. Over the next months, the Simbas' military fortunes greatly declined and they were pushed back by the ANC and its allies. In September 1965, Bidalira was officially promoted to general responsible for the Uvira area. At the time, the Simba forces around Uvira were attacked by pro-ANC forces as part of Operation South. After the Simbas' Kibamba base fell during this operation, a meeting of rebel leaders was held on the Ruzizi Plain in December 1965, with Bidalira being one of the attendees. The officers subsequently issued a declaration which declared their continued commitment to guerrilla strategy and ideological training. The document was assessed by historian Erik Kennes to be deeply unrealistic, ignoring that the Simbas had become deeply unpopular among most of the local population. In late 1965, Bidalira arranged the murder of Marandura Musa. At one point around 1965/66, he went on a lengthy trip abroad before returning to the Congo and resuming command of his troops.

After the collapse of the main Simba forces, Bidalira emerged as the leader of one of the remnant factions, namely the "Bafulero Maquis" which enjoyed limited support by one other Simba officer, Alexis Mushubazi. Bidalira and Sylvestre-Marie Luetsha were the rebel leaders who made the most effort to rally and reorganize the remaining Simba splinters. The cooperation between these two was brokered by Kilenga Saleh. On 30–31 January, Luetsha called for an assembly of several APL officers who chose Louis Bidalira as chief commander, Luetsha as chief of staff, and Raphaël Milambo as a deputy. Yet this attempt failed to unite the scattered insurgents, as several Simba units subsequently defected to the ANC, while political leaders chose to remain in exile rather than rejoin the struggle. Luetsha organized two more meetings in September 1966, still seeking to reunite the infighting Simbas under Bidalira's command, but these attempts also failed.

In 1966, Bidalira fled the Congo, leaving command of his forces to Zabuloni and Kibingu Marandura. As infighting among the Simba forces intensified, he became part of the "Soumialot movement" and the CNS-Soumialot. Accordingly, he did not join a rival Simba current organized by Laurent-Désiré Kabila. In 1967, Kabila returned from exile to the Congo, seeking to rally various Simba remnants as the Maquis of Fizi. However, most Simba leaders refused to submit to him. Bidalira personally disliked Kabila, refusing to accept the latter as leader due to him being Katangese and a "non-commissioned officer". Over the following time, the remnants of Bidalira's forces would be either shattered in rebel infighting or be absorbed by other militias.

=== Later life and death ===
In 1985, Bidalira took part in discussions of various Congolese opposition factions regarding a new insurgency. He met with representatives of the MNC-L, Congolese National Liberation Front, Nicolas Olenga's group, and possibly André Kisase Ngandu. Yet these meetings and alliances among opposition groups amounted to little until the 1990s. At some point, he rejoined civilian life in Uvira Territory.

In the First Congo War of 1996–1997, Mai-Mai self-defense militias emerged across eastern Congo to oppose various armed factions which were regarded as occupiers by locals. Bidalira was one of those who took up arms, joining a Mai-Mai network in Uvira Territory. Alongside Kayamba Kihumbi, he eventually assumed leadership of a militia based at Kahungwe which took control of Sange. He continued to serve as a Mai-Mai leader in the Second Congo War from 1998. His Mai-Mai militia was composed of Fuliru in the Uvira Territory, and battled Rally for Congolese Democracy rebels. In April 2000, he co-led a Mai-Mai operation which captured Lemera.

He was killed in August or September 2001. Bidalira's Mai-Mai militia subsequently splintered into around a dozen armed groups which continued to be active over the next two decades.
