= Operation Dragon Rouge =

Hostage rescue operation in the Congo Crisis

- Part of the Simba rebellion during the Congo Crisis
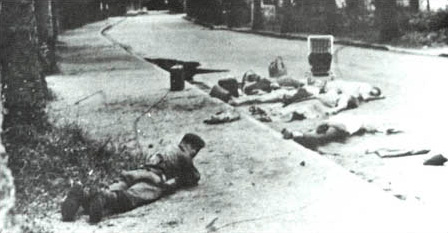
- A Belgian paratrooper with hostages killed minutes before their arrival
Date	24 November 1964
Location	Stanleyville, Congo-Léopoldville
Result	Belgian–American success: Most hostages rescued; Rebels defeated

Belligerents
Belgium; United States; Supported by: Democratic Republic of the Congo	Simba rebels

Commanders and leaders
Charles Laurent; (Democratic Republic of the Congo) Frédéric Vandewalle (Note: Vandewalle was a Belgian national, but was personally asked by Prime Minister Tshombe to become his personal military adviser on 5 August 1964 and, later, take the command to retake the rebellious region.); Burgess Gradwell	Christophe Gbenye; Pierre Mulele

Strength
(Belgium) 350 paratroopers (United States) 15 C-130 aircraft (United States) ~200 Anti-Castro Cuban infantry (CIA sponsored) (Democratic Republic of the Congo) 5 Commando	500–600 rebels

Casualties and losses
2 killed 12 wounded	99 killed 134 wounded 20 captured
- 24 hostages killed

Operation Dragon Rouge (French: Opération Dragon Rouge, IPA: [ɔpeɾasjõ dɾagõ ɾuʒə], meaning "Operation Red Dragon") was a hostage rescue operation in the Democratic Republic of the Congo conducted jointly by Belgium and the United States in 1964. The operation was led by the Belgian Paracommando Regiment to rescue hostages held by Simba rebels in the city of Stanleyville.

== Background ==
By 1964, the Léopoldville government, supported by Western powers, was gaining a foothold in its fight to suppress the communist-backed Simba rebellion. Fearing an inevitable defeat, the rebels resorted to taking hostages of the local white population in areas under their control. On 28 October the Simba rebels arrested all Belgians and Americans in Stanleyville. Several hundred hostages were taken to Stanleyville and placed under guard in the Victoria Hotel.

The Léopoldville government turned to Belgium and the United States for help. In response, the Belgian army sent a task force to Léopoldville, airlifted by the U.S. 322nd Air Division. Washington and Brussels worked jointly on a rescue plan. Several ideas were considered and discarded, and all attempts at negotiating with the Simbas had failed.

== Operation ==
The Belgian task force was led by Colonel Charles Laurent. On the early morning of 24 November 1964, five American C-130 Hercules planes dropped 320 Belgian paratroopers of the Paracommando Regiment onto the airfield at Stanleyville. Once the paratroopers had secured the airfield and cleared the runway they made their way to the Victoria Hotel, prevented Simbas from killing most of the 60 hostages, and evacuated them via the airfield.

At 7:00 hrs, the hostages at Residence Victoria were rounded up by the Simba guards and ordered into the street. Around 50 of them had barricaded themselves in their rooms, after having heard the order on Radio Stanleyville at 6:30 to kill all foreigners, but most obediently moved into the street, as they were heading for the airfield. After a short march, when the Simba rebels got word that the airport of Stanleyville was now under Belgian control, the hostages were ordered to sit down in the street.

After a few minutes, when heavy firing was heard nearby, some of the Simbas opened fire on the seated Belgians and Americans. The Paracommandos intervened and stabilized the situation by killing and/or driving away the Simbas. Of the 250 hostages gathered by the rebels, 18 were dead, and 40 were heavily wounded.

Paul Carlson, an American medical missionary, was among those killed during the raid. Around 1,600 foreign nationals and 150 Congolese civilians were evacuated. In addition to the direct victims during the raid, several others were killed as a reaction to the arrival of the Belgian troops. Among these victims were many missionaries, such as the Dox brothers. By mid-December, about one month after Operation Dragon Rouge, a total of 185 foreign hostages left behind in various Simba controlled areas of the Congo, along with several thousand Congolese civilians, had been executed by the Simba rebels.

== Aftermath ==
Map of government and allied offensive against Simba rebels September – December 1964

The operation coincided with the arrival of Armée nationale congolaise (ANC) and other foreign mercenary units—which likely included the hastily formed 5th Mechanised Brigade and Mike Hoare's 5 Commando—at Stanleyville, which was quickly captured. Because of growing international pressure, Belgium and the U.S. decided to abandon plans for follow-on operations in Bunia and Watsa. A second rescue operation, Operation Dragon Noir, was carried out in Paulis on 26 November. It took the central government until the end of the year to completely put down the remaining areas of the Simba rebellion.

Despite the success of the raid, Moise Tshombe's prestige was damaged by the joint Belgian–U.S. operation which saw white mercenaries and Western forces intervene once again in the Congo. In particular, Tshombe lost the support of President Joseph Kasa-Vubu and Chief of the Army Joseph-Desiré Mobutu. Tshombe was dismissed from his post as prime minister in October 1965. In Burundi, protests occurred outside the Belgian and United States embassies.
