= 4 Commando (Democratic Republic of the Congo) =

4 Commando (Congo mercenary unit)

4 Commando ANC
- Active: Dec 1960 - 1961
- Country: Democratic Republic of the Congo
- Type: Mercenary
- Nickname(s): Force Katangaise
- Engagements: Katanga and South Kasai secessions

Commanders
- Commander: Frédéric Vandewalle
- Commander: Mike Hoare

4 Commando (also known as "4 Commando ANC" and "Force Katangaise") was a mercenary unit of the Armée Nationale Congolaise (the Congolese National Army) in the Democratic Republic of the Congo from 1960 to 1961. It was formed in Katanga as a scratch unit made up of locally recruited citizens, Belgians, doctors, pilots and other mercenary volunteers from around the world. They are trained to be commando. The unit was initially created by Frédéric Vandewalle and later commanded by Lt. Col. Mike Hoare.

== Activities in Congo ==
4 Commando involvement in the Congo was limited and short-lived. The Commando was composed of citizenry, World War Two veterans, former members of the Rhodesian Light Infantry (RLI) and ex-members of the Israeli Army. The Commando only saw action from 7 April to 11 April 1961 opposing United Nations peacekeeping forces and Baluba militias advance on Baluba along with the gendarmerie of the State of Katanga. The mercenary forces were unable to hold back the UN forces and by August/September 1961, 4 Commando and the White Legion (Compagnie Internationale) were forced out of Katanga by Malayan members of the UN Peacekeeping forces.

The mercenaries had let Tshombe down badly and had failed to ensure the secession of Katanga. Although they had proved ruthless against the Baluba in north Katanga and against the Armée Nationale Congolaise (ANC) units they encountered on the borders, they had failed miserably in repelling the United Nations forces encountered in the field and had simply "..melted away". The Commando was disbanded in December 1961, and after the Katanga debacle, the "4 Commando" name was never used again. When asked to form a new, large mercenary contingent, Hoare elected to name it 5 Commando as opposed to expanding 4 Commando.
