= Louis Bobozo =

Congolese military officer (1915–1982)

Major General Louis de Gonzague Bobozo
- Born: 1915; Mongala District, Belgian Congo
- Died: July 1982 (aged 66–67); Zaire
- Other name: Bobozo Salelo Ndembo Adurama
- Military career
- Allegiance: Congo; DR Congo
- Branch: Force Publique; Congolese National Army
- Service years: 1933–1972
- Rank: Major General
- Commands: Camp Hardy; Fourth Congolese Regiment; Armée Nationale Congolaise
- Conflicts: Second World War; East African Campaign; Siege of Saïo; Congo Crisis; Simba Rebellion

Louis de Gonzague Bobozo (1915 – July 1982) was a Congolese military officer who served as commander-in-chief of the Congolese National Army from 1965 until 1972.

== Biography ==
Louis Bobozo was born in 1915 in the Mongala District, Équateur Province, Belgian Congo. He voluntarily enlisted in the Force Publique on 28 June 1933. On 1 April 1940 he was promoted to the rank of sergeant. In 1941 he was deployed to Ethiopia to participate in the East African Campaign of World War II, commanding a machine gun platoon during the Siege of Saïo. From 1953–1954 he served as drill instructor to the young Joseph-Désiré Mobutu in Luluabourg and became his mentor. He was one of the few Congolese soldiers in the entire army to achieve the rank of adjutant before the independence of the Congo in 1960.

Following independence, the Force Publique mutinied to protest poor conditions. African officers were appointed to replace European personnel to alleviate the problem, and Mobutu was made chief-of-staff of the force, renamed the Armée Nationale Congolaise (ANC). Due to the upheaval in the officer corps and his family ties with Mobutu, Bobozo was quickly promoted to colonel and put in charge of the garrison of Camp Hardy in Thysville. He briefly acted as interim commander-in-chief of the army in October. In 1963 he was put in charge of a new unit, the fourth groupement (regiment) of South Katanga. On 30 May 1964 he led a small government force to recapture the town of Albertville from Simba rebels. In July 1964 he was promoted to the rank of major general.

Following Mobutu's coup in November 1965, Bobozo was appointed commander-in-chief of the ANC. On 13 November 1970 he suffered a severe stroke and had to relinquish his duties to an acting general. He officially retired as commander-in-chief in 1972. He died in July 1982.
