= Simba rebellion =

1963–1965 rebellion in the Congo

- Part of the Congo Crisis and the Cold War
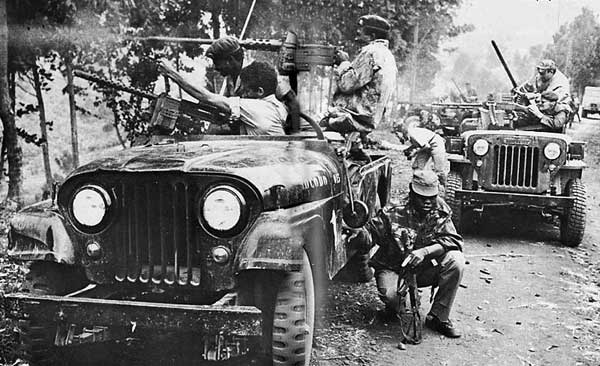
- Simba rebellion (green); Kwilu Rebellion (yellow) ANC soldiers alongside white mercenaries, engaged in combat against the Simba rebels.
Date	1963 – November 1965 (Simba holdouts continue resistance until 1996)
Location	Democratic Republic of the Congo, with spillovers into Uganda and Sudan
Result	Government victory

Belligerents
Democratic Republic of the Congo (Note: The Republic of the Congo became the Democratic Republic of the Congo in August 1964.); Belgium; United States; Anyanya; Banyamulenge militias (1965)	People's Republic of the Congo; Simba rebels; Gbenye-Olenga faction; Soumialot faction; Kabila-Massengo faction; Inyenzi movement Uganda Sudan; Foreign support: Soviet Union; Cuba; Tanganyika (Note: Tanganyika became Tanzania in April 1964 following its incorporation of Zanzibar); China; Burundi; Egypt; Algeria

Commanders and leaders
Joseph Kasa-Vubu; Cyrille Adoula; Moïse Tshombe; Louis Bobozo; Frédéric Vandewalle (Note: Vandewalle was a Belgian national, but was personally asked by Prime Minister Tshombe to become his personal military adviser on 5 August 1964 and, later, take the command to retake the rebellious region.); Joseph-Desiré Mobutu; Charles Laurent; Robert D. Forman; Joseph Lagu	Christophe Gbenye; Nicholas Olenga; Gaston Soumialot; Laurent-Désiré Kabila; Ildéphonse Massengo; (Sudan) Al-Khatim Al-Khalifa; (Cuba) Che Guevara

Strength
Congo-Léopoldville: ~29,000 ANC; Belgium: 350 paratroopers United States: 128 commandos 200 Cuban dissidents 5 C-130 transport aircraft	Unknown Simba rebels; Thousands of Rwandan Inyenzi; 200 Cuban and Soviet advisors

Casualties and losses
- Large civilian casualties, including 392 Europeans and at minimum 20,000 Africans executed by rebels. Tens of thousands killed in total during suppression of the rebellion.

The Simba rebellion, also known as the Orientale revolt, was a regional uprising which took place in the Democratic Republic of the Congo between 1963 and 1965 in the wider context of the Congo Crisis and the Cold War. The rebellion, located in the east of the country, was led by the followers of Patrice Lumumba, who had been ousted from power in 1960 by Joseph Kasa-Vubu and Joseph-Désiré Mobutu and subsequently killed in January 1961 in Katanga. The rebellion was contemporaneous with the Kwilu rebellion led by fellow Lumumbist Pierre Mulele in central Congo.

The Simba rebels were initially successful and captured much of eastern Congo, proclaiming a "people's republic" at Stanleyville. However, the insurgency suffered from a lack of organization and coherence, as well as tensions between the rebel leadership and its international allies of the Eastern Bloc. When the Congolese government launched a number of major counter-offensives from late 1964, spearheaded by battle-hardened mercenaries and backed by Western powers, the rebels suffered several major defeats and disintegrated. By November 1965, the Simba rebellion was effectively defeated, though holdouts of the rebels continued their insurgency until the 1990s.

== Background ==
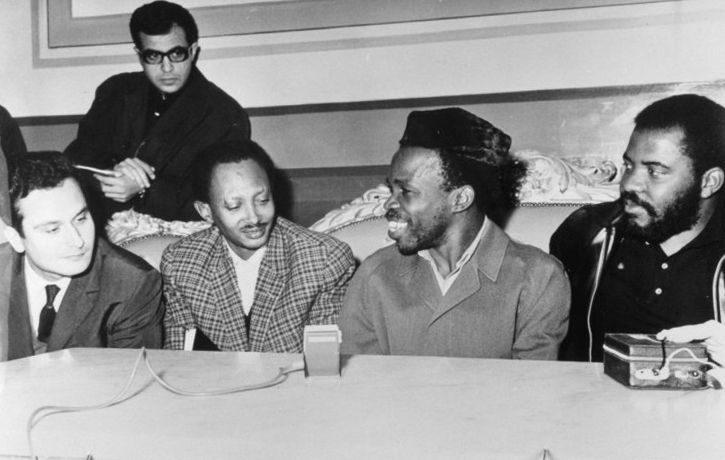
Gaston Soumialot (center right) in 1965

The causes of the Simba Rebellion should be viewed as part of the wider struggle for power within the Republic of the Congo following independence from Belgium on 30 June 1960 as well as within the context of other Cold War interventions in Africa by the West and the Soviet Union. The rebellion can be immediately traced back to the assassination of the first Prime Minister of the Congo, Patrice Lumumba, in January 1961. Political infighting and intrigue followed, resulting in the ascendancy of Joseph Kasa-Vubu and Joseph-Désiré Mobutu in Kinshasa at the expense of politicians who had supported Lumumba such as Antoine Gizenga, Christophe Gbenye, and Gaston Soumialot.

In 1961, this change in power led Antoine Gizenga to declare the creation of a rebel government in Stanleyville. This rival government, dubbed the Free Republic of the Congo, received support from the Soviet Union and China as they positioned themselves as being "socialists" opposed to American intervention in the Congo and involvement in the death of Lumumba, however, the precise political orientation of the Lumumbists following his death remains an ongoing historical debate.

However, in August 1961, Gizenga dissolved the government in Stanleyville with the intention of taking part in the United Nations sponsored talks at Lovanium University. These talks ultimately did not deliver the Lumumbist government that had been intended. Gizenga was arrested and imprisoned on Bula-Mbemba and many of the Lumumbists went into exile.

It was in exile that the rebellion began to take shape. On 3 October 1963, the Conseil National de Libération (CNL) was founded by Gbenye and Soumialot in Brazzaville, capital of the neighbouring Republic of the Congo. The CNL was backed by pro-Lumumba leaders as well as "emerging local warlords" based in Orientale Province as well as Kivu in eastern Congo. However, whilst these plans for rebellion were being developed in exile, Pierre Mulele returned from his training in China to launch a revolution in his native province of Kwilu in 1963.

Mulele proved to be a capable leader and scored a number of early successes, although these would remain localised to Kwilu. With the country again seeming to be in open rebellion of the government in Kinshasa, the CNL launched its rebellion in their political heartland of eastern Congo.

== Simba forces and ideology ==
To the extent that the [Simba] movement had an ideology, it was an mixture of nationalism, village Marxism, and magic.

— Monteagle Stearns, United States diplomat

Christophe Gbenye's forces were organized as the "Armée Populaire de Libération" (APL), though were generally nicknamed "Simbas", meaning a lion or big lion in Swahili. recruitment was often driven by local grievances including economic frustrations and dissatisfaction with current authority. The Simba's recruited from ANC mutineers, ethnic groups, and youth militants (jeunesse, French for "youth", used to refer to youth militias and youth supporters aligned with Lumumbist factions, some of which acted as an informal youth wing of the Simba forces), participating in auxiliary activities and irregular combat utilising traditional weaponry alongside ritualist medicines.

In general, the Armée Populaire de Libération was divided into regular units which were organized like the ANC (namely the unités d'operations and unités de garnison), and units which were more akin to irregular militias (barriéres). Although they were on average well motivated, the Simbas lacked discipline and their command as well as control was often chaotic. They were also critically underequipped, with many rebels relying on machetes and spears due to lacking guns.

The majority of the Simbas were young men and teens, although child soldiers also existed among the insurgents. The rebels were led by Gaston Soumialot, a former member of Gizenga's Parti Solidaire Africain (PSA), Gbenye, a prominent leader of the Lumumbist faction of the Mouvement National Congolais (MNC-L) and Laurent-Désiré Kabila, who had been a member of the Lumumba-aligned Association générale des Baluba du Katanga (BALUBAKAT), who came together to form a political coalition and military organisation known as the Conseil National de Libération.

Because of the range of political beliefs amongst the Simba rebels, attributing an ideology to the rebellion is very complex. Whilst the leaders claimed to be influenced by Chinese Maoist ideas, the Cuban military advisor Che Guevara wrote that the majority of the fighters did not hold these views. Some fighters also practised a system of traditional beliefs which held that correct behaviour and the regular reapplying of dawa (water ritually applied by a medicine man) would leave the fighters impervious to bullets. Rebel leader Martin Kasongo proclaimed that "no one can touch us. [Bullets] dissolve into water. You Americans can bring all your bullets and bombs. They'll be no use". Researcher Ato Kwamena Onoma described the Simba rebellion as "Lumumbist". The rebellion was backed by the MNC-L party. The CIA and the United States States Department described the rebellion as driven by opportunity, local grievance, and the continued the legacy of Lumumba's assassination.

In addition to native Congolese, the Simba rebels included Rwandan exiles of the Inyenzi movement. These exiles had repeatedly attempted to retake their home country without success, most prominently during the Bugesera invasion of December 1963. Frustrated that Congolese authorities hampered their activities and radicalised by their repeated failures, Inyenzi based in the Congo joined the Simba rebellion because they hoped that a Simba-led government would support their own efforts in Rwanda. Rwandan exiles held prominent positions within the rebel hierarchy, with Jerome Katarebe serving as chef de cabinet. The Rwandan exiles held a reputation as good and disciplined fighters among the insurgents.

== Early rebel expansion, late 1963 – July 1964 ==
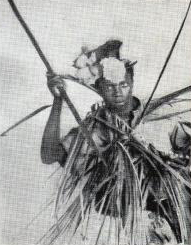
A Simba rebel with traditional clothing and weaponry. Poorly armed, the insurgents often placed an emphasis on magical protection to terrify and overwhelm their opponents.

As the Kwilu rebellion spread and escalated, Soumialot obtained the support of the government of Burundi in recruiting thousands of troops along the Burundian-Congolese border. With these forces, he invaded South Kivu in late 1963. After taking control of most of the province, Soumialot's army overran the last local government holdouts at Uvira on 15 May 1964, followed by Fizi shortly after. Pro-Simba forces successfully revolted in the important harbor town of Albertville in late May, capturing Jason Sendwe, President of North Katanga Province. On 30 May 1964, a small ANC detachment led by Louis Bobozo retook the town, rescuing Sendwe and killing about 250 rebels. The government troops soon alienated the locals due to their brutal behavior. When another rebellion broke out in the town on 19 June 1964, Soumialot's forces exploited the resulting chaos and captured Albertville. The government forces fled, leaving Sendwe behind; he was subsequently murdered by either Simba rebels or, less likely, ANC soldiers, though the circumstances remain unclear and disputed.

Meanwhile, Christophe Gbenye and Nicholas Olenga rose in revolt in northeastern Congo, quickly expanding their army and territories. By June 1964, they held North Kivu, and southern Orientale Province. They did not coordinate their operations with Soumialot who distrusted Gbenye. A third rebel force, independent of Soumialot, Gbenye, and Olenga, rebelled in northern Katanga in early June. These insurgents considered themselves "true" Communists, and were led by Laurent-Désiré Kabila and Ildéphonse Massengo. They had no real connections to the other Simba factions. Kabila and Massengo's troops conquered the entire western shore of Lake Tanganyika, including Moba by late June. They then advanced into the Province of Maniema, and captured its strategically important capital Kindu on 22 July.

The local Armée Nationale Congolaise (ANC) garrisons reacted with brutal counter-insurgency actions that failed to defeat the Simbas, but alienated the population of the eastern provinces. Furthermore, the Simba rebels often managed to intimidate well-equipped ANC units into retreating or defecting without a fight, thereby capturing much-needed weaponry for the insurgency. As the Simba rebellion in eastern Congo spread, the states of the Eastern Bloc took increasing interest. The Soviet Union implored neighboring nationalist regimes to aid the rebels. The Soviet leadership promised that it would replace all weaponry given to the Simbas in given time, but rarely did so.According to Lisa Namikas' research, Soviet support for the Congolese rebels was largely symbolic. In order to supply the rebels, the Soviet Union transported equipment via cargo planes to Juba in allied Sudan. From there, the Sudanese transported weapons into the Congo This operation backfired, however, as southern Sudan was engulfed in its own civil war. The Sudanese Anyanya insurgents consequently ambushed the Soviet-Sudanese supply convoys and captured the weapons for themselves.

When the CIA learned of these attacks, it allied with the Anyanya. The Anyanya consequently helped the Western/Congolese air forces to locate Simba rebel camps and supply routes, and destroy them. In return, the Sudanese rebels were given weapons for their own war. Angered by the Soviet support for the insurgents, the Congolese government expelled the Soviet embassy's personnel from the country in July 1964; the Soviet leadership responded by increasing its aid for the Simbas. Meanwhile, the Simbas continued to advance. By late July 1964, the insurgents controlled about half of the Congo. Utterly demoralized by repeated defeats, many ANC soldiers believed that the Simba rebels had become invincible thanks to magical rituals performed by insurgent shamans such as the Mama Onema. Amid these rebel successes, the United States government pressured President Kasa-Vubu to dismiss Prime Minister Cyrille Adoula, and install a new government led by Moïse Tshombe. The U.S. and Belgian leadership believed that Tshombe was supportive of their interests as well as a more effective leader, thereby being the ideal person to lead the Congo in the conflict against the Simba rebels. Tshombe had previously led the failed separatist State of Katanga which had received significant backing from the Belgian government. With few options left, Kasa-Vubu agreed and Tshombe returned from exile as the new prime minister on 30 July 1964.

The State Department in the United States regarded the Congo as a "pivot point" located perfectly between the now White-ruled southern Africa and the newly independent states towards the north. The United States consistently sought to maintain a pro-Western government in Léopoldville capable of securing the country's vast mineral wealth. The lead decision makers in Washington and Brussels acknowledged in private that the Simba rebel leaders were not associated with communism. Despite this, they viewed the Simbas as a threat to their strategic interest, motivating to increasingly intervene. Officially, the United States and Belgium justified their involvement by framing the Simba rebellion as Soviet- or Chinese-directed Communist insurgency.

== Moïse Tshombe assumes power and government forces regain initiative, July – August 1964 ==
The Simba faction of Gbenye and Olenga reportedly used the Congolese independence flag.

Tshombe reorganized the Congolese war effort, circumventing other political and military leaders such as Kasa-Vubu and Mobutu. He asked the Western nations for military assistance, recruited White mercenaries, and brought his exiled loyalist troops (the Katangese Gendarmerie) back into the country. The mercenary-led forces gradually arrived at the frontlines from July 1964. Tshombe's rise to power caused considerable displeasure in the Congo and other African countries. The Ugandan government, which felt that the newly installed Tshombe government was beholden to Western interests, promptly offered covert aid to Gbenye. This included the use of government forces to train the rebels as well as the allowance for Ugandan territory to be used as a resupply route. Some Ugandan troops served alongside the rebels in combat, and the Congolese ANC and the Uganda Army's 1st Battalion directly clashed along the border of the two countries at some point in 1964. Other countries which sent covert military support through weapons shipments and training included Egypt under Gamal Abdel Nasser, and Algeria under Ahmed Ben Bella. China also provided limited aid to the rebels, with Chinese experts based in the Congo, Burundi, and Tanzania suspected of training Simba insurgents.

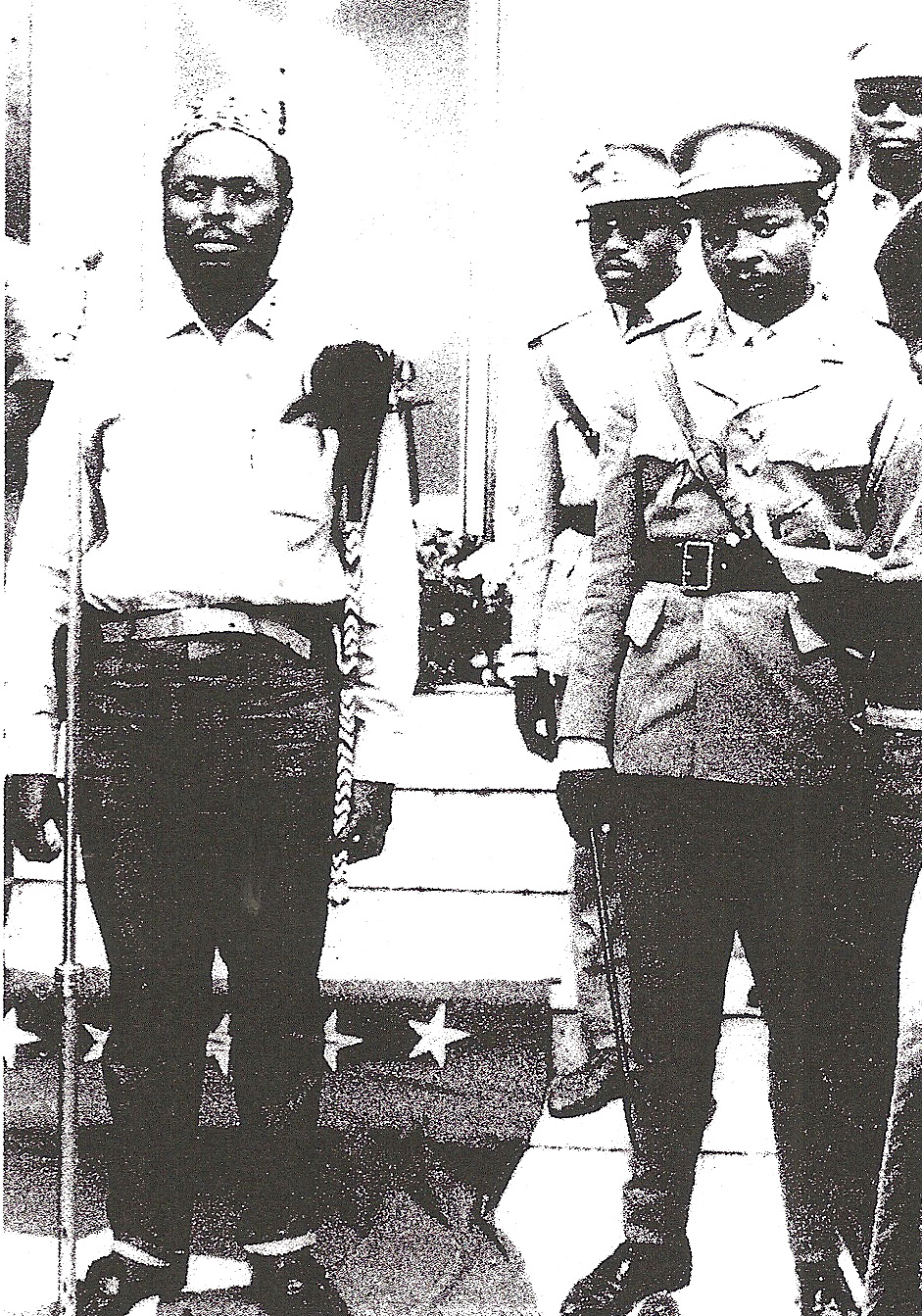
Christophe Gbenye (left) and General Nicholas Olenga (right), before the Patrice Lumumba monument in Stanleyville, 1964

By August 1964, they had captured Stanleyville where a 1,500-man ANC force fled leaving behind weapons and vehicles which the Simba rebels captured. The attack consisted of a charge, led by shamans, with forty Simba warriors. No shots were fired by the Simba rebels. Following the conquest of Stanleyville, the rebels proclaimed a "People's Republic of the Congo" (République populaire du Congo) while portraying the existing Congolese government as Western puppet regime.

As the rebel movement spread, acts of violence and terror increased. Thousands of Congolese were executed in systematic purges by the Simbas, including government officials, political leaders of opposition parties, provincial and local police, school teachers, and others believed to have been Westernized. Many of the executions were carried out with extreme cruelty, in front of a monument to Patrice Lumumba in Stanleyville. About 1,000 to 2,000 Westernized Congolese were murdered in Stanleyville alone. In contrast, the rebels initially left whites and foreigners mostly alone. Following the fall of Stanleyville, the Congolese government reacted to the prominent involvement of Rwandan exiles in the Simba rebellion by ordering that all Rwandan refugees were to be expelled from the Congo. Even though the vast majority of Rwandans in the Congo were uninvolved in the uprising and living peacefully, they were consequently the target of ethnic violence and blamed "for all sorts of evil" by Congolese authorities.

With much of northern Congo and the Congolese upcountry under their control, the Simba rebels moved south against Kasaï Province. Kasaï had rich mining concerns but was also a strategic key to more lasting control of Congo. If the rebels could capture Kasai Province up to the Angola border they could cut the government forces in half, isolating Katanga Province and severely overstretching ANC lines. In August 1964 unknown thousands of Simbas moved down out of the hills and began the conquest of Kasaï. As before ANC forces retreated with little fight by either throwing down arms completely or defecting to the rebels.

Newly appointed Prime Minister Tshombe acted decisively against the new threat. Using contacts he had made while exiled in Spain, Tshombe was able to organize an airlift of his former soldiers currently exiled in rural Angola. The airlift was enacted by the United States and facilitated by the Portuguese as both feared a Soviet influenced socialist state in the middle of Africa. Tshombe's forces were composed primarily of Belgian trained Katangese Gendarmes who had previously served the Belgian Colonial Authority. They were a highly disciplined and well equipped force who had only just barely lost a bid for independence in the previous conflict. In addition the force was accompanied by Jerry Puren and a score of mercenary pilots flying Second World War surplus training planes fitted with machine guns. The combined force marched on Kasai Province and encountered Simba forces near Luluabourg. The engagement began in a shallow, long valley with Simba forces attacking in an irregular mixture of infantry and motorized forces, which charged directly at the ANC force. In response, the ANC troops also advanced directly, led by jeeps and trucks. The Simba rebels encountered heavy losses because of ANC machine-gun fire. It was a decisive defeat and the Simba rebels were forced to abandon their attacks in Kasai.

Success in Kasai justified Tshombe's decision to bring in Western mercenaries to augment well-trained Katangese formations. Two hundred mercenaries from France, South Africa, West Germany, the United Kingdom, Ireland, Spain, and Angola arrived in Katanga Province over the next month. The largely white mercenaries provided the ANC with a highly trained and experienced force that was unaffected by the indiscipline and social tensions within the ANC. They provided an expertise that could not be matched. Ironically, their presence also strengthened the recruitment efforts of the Simba rebels who could portray the ANC as a Western puppet. Once the mercenaries were concentrated they spearheaded a combined offensive against Albertville. Once captured, Albertville would give the ANC access to Lake Tanganyika and serve as a staging base for future offensives to relieve Government enclaves in the North. Simba forces were deployed in several large mobs around Albertville in expectation for an attack by ANC infantry and the motorized Gendarmes.

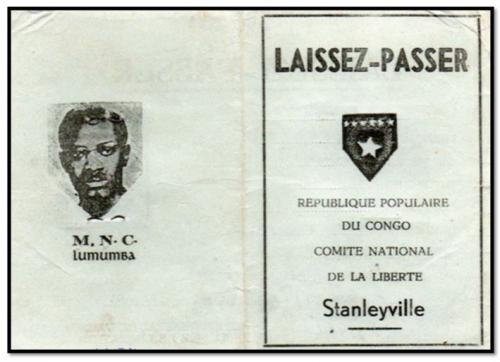
Official pass issued by the People's Republic of the Congo, the communist government declared by the Simbas

Mike Hoare, a white mercenary commander, led three boats of mercenaries around the Simba rebel flank to attack Albertville from the rear in a night attack. The move made good progress but was diverted when it ran across a Catholic priest who convinced the mercenaries to rescue 60 clergy being held by Simba troops. The mercenaries failed to either rescue the priests or capture the Albertville airport. The next day ANC infantry and the motorized Gendarmes re-captured the city, overwhelming poorly armed Simba resistance. Together with the success in Kasai the victory at Albertville stabilized the government southern flank. The abuse of the clergy also increased Western support for the Tshombe Government.

=== Hostages ===
The rebels started taking hostages from the local white population in areas under their control. Several hundred hostages were taken to Stanleyville and placed under guard in the Victoria Hotel. A group of Belgian and Italian nuns were taken hostage by rebel leader Gaston Soumaliot. The nuns were forced into hard labor in Uvira. Uvira is near the border with Burundi and was a supply route for the rebellions. On October 7, 1964, Uvira and the nuns were liberated. From Uvira they escaped by road to Bukavu from where they returned to Belgium by airplane.

In late October 1964, nearly 1,000 European and U.S. citizens were taken hostage by rebel forces in Stanleyville. The hostage drew significant international attention and outrage. In response, Belgium and the United States launched a military intervention on 24 November 1964.

== Rebel collapse, August 1964 – November 1965 ==
Map of government and allied offensive against Simba rebels September – December 1964

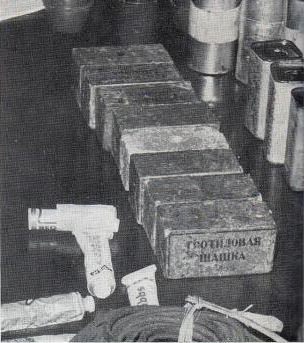
Soviet explosives seized by the Congolese army from the Simbas

As aid from the Soviet Union was received by the rebels, the Simba forces made one final push against the government capital of Leopoldville. The advance made some headway but was stopped cold when several hundred mercenaries were airlifted north and attacked the flank of the Simba pincer. The mercenaries were then able to capture the key town of Boende. After this success, more mercenaries were hired and dispatched to every province in Congo.

Once the final Simba offensives were checked, the ANC began to squeeze Simba-controlled territory from all sides. ANC commanders formed a loose perimeter around rebel areas, pushing in with a variety of shallow and deep pincers. With mercenaries acting as shock contingent for ANC forces, the Congolese government used aircraft to transport mercenaries to hotspots or rebel strongholds. Mercenary forces became adept at outflanking and then reducing Simba positions with enfilade fire.

=== Government counter-offensives ===
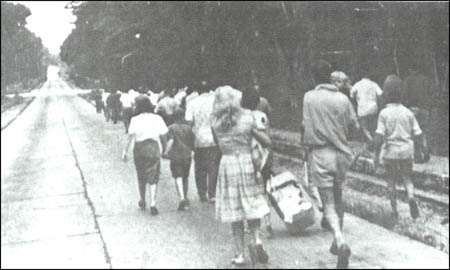
Refugees move towards the airfield for evacuation

Though war was turning in favor of the ANC, problems remained for the Congolese government. Most notably, the rebels still held numerous hostages and important towns in eastern Congo. In response, the Congolese government turned to Belgium and the United States for help. The Belgian Army sent a task force to Léopoldville, airlifted by the U.S. 322d Airlift Division. Following failed attempts to negotiate with Simba forces the American and Belgian governments considered multiple options including a UN supported extraction and a covert rescue mission involving motorized boats. However these plans were all deemed either too slow or impractical to be achievable

The Congolese government and its Western allies finally decided to launch a multi-pronged campaign. ANC troops led by mercenary columns would advance from the west, southwest, southeast (Albertville) and east (Bukavu). The mercenaries were well equipped for the campaign, and given access to jeeps, trucks, mortars and armoured fighting vehicles. In addition, the ANC was provided with foreign advisors, including about 200 Cuban CIA agents who operated on the ground and also flew for the Congolese Air Force. The ground forces which were coming from the west and attacking Bas-Uele were also supported by armoured trains. While these ground offensives were going on, an international task force was prepared for airborne attacks on the urban centers of the rebels.

Though the initial ground attacks met with some success, the Simbas still managed to offer significant resistance, and even retook some areas amid counter-attacks soon after the campaign's beginning. The first airborne assault was carried out on 24 November. Organized by Belgian Colonel Charles Laurent, the attack was code-named Dragon Rouge and targeted Stanleyville. Five US Air Force C-130 transports dropped 350 Belgian paratroopers of the Para-Commando Regiment onto Simi-Simi Airport on the western outskirts of Stanleyville. Once the paratroopers had secured the airfield and cleared the runway they made their way to the Victoria Hotel, prevented Simba rebels from killing most of the 60 hostages, and evacuated them via the airfield. Over the next two days over 1,800 Americans and Europeans were evacuated, as well as around 400 Congolese. However, almost 200 foreigners and thousands of Congolese were executed by the Simbas. Among them were several missionaries such as the American Dr. Paul Carlson and the Belgian Dox brothers. While the Belgians were securing Stanleyville, the ANC's columns "Lima I" and "Lima II" broke through the Simba defenses and arrived at Stanleyville on the same day. On 26 November, a second mission (Dragon Noir) was flown by the Belgians and captured Isiro. The Belgians withdrew most of their forces from the Congo after the successful conclusion of Dragon Rouge and Dragon Noir. The fall of Stanleyville and Isiro "broke the back of the eastern insurrection, which never recovered." The Simba leadership fled into exile while descending into disarray and severe disagreements; Gbenye was shot in the shoulder by one of his generals after dismissing him. However, many African states voiced support for the Simbas' cause after the Belgian operations.

=== Final rebel strongholds ===
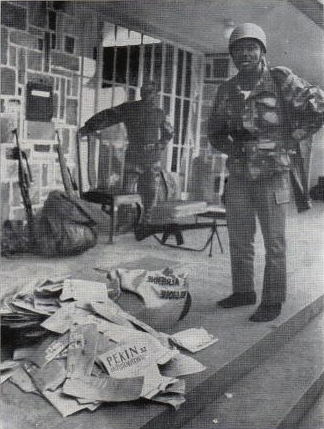
ANC soldiers with captured Maoist rebel propaganda

Though the Simba rebellion had been crushed, rebel remnants continued to be active. Weak and no real threat to the Congolese government, they waged a low-level guerrilla war from bases in remote frontier regions. Of the rebel leadership, Kabila and Soumialot continued to support the remaining insurgents from their exile in Tanzania. In contrast, Gbenye and Olenga initially became businessmen in Sudan and Uganda. They made peace with Mobutu and returned to the Congo in 1971. Soumialot was probably killed by his own troops while waging an insurgency in the Fizi-Baraka area of the Congo in the late 1960s. Notable Simba holdouts were located in the western Virunga Mountains (these forces eventually became the Parti de Libération Congolais) and in South Kivu (Kabila's People's Revolution Party). The Rwandan exiles no longer played a significant role in the Simba holdouts. Some exiled Simbas resumed their insurgency in the 1980s or 1990s. Notable examples include the Front for the Liberation of Congo – Patrice Lumumba (FLC-L) and André Kisase Ngandu's forces.

From March to June 1965, ANC contingents and mercenaries under Hoare and Jacques Noel organized Operations "White Giant" and "Violettes Imperiales", military offensives aimed at retaking the areas bordering Uganda, Sudan, and the Central African Republic. These operations cut off important rebel supply routes, recaptured a number of strategically significant towns in northern Orientale Province, and deprived the insurgents of local gold mines. This greatly weakened the Simba rebellion. Meanwhile, around 100 Afro-Cuban volunteers under Che Guevara arrived to train the remaining Simba forces in eastern Congo. There were also plans to send trainers from other communist countries to Congo as well. Instead, however, international support for the Simbas declined. This resulted from growing conflicts within and among the socialist states, most notably the 1965 Algerian coup d'état and the Sino-Soviet split. Furthermore, the Maoist leadership of the Simbas disagreed with the Cubans over ideology, resulting in tensions that undermined any military cooperation. In contrast, the Rwandan exiles continued to back the Simba rebels, and became even more important to the Simba forces due to the gradual end of other foreign support. The "Rwandese Popular Movement" and the "Rwanda Youth National Union" led by Jean Kayitare, son of Rwandan exile leader François Rukeba, each mobilized a battalion to assist the beleaguered Simbas. One Rwandan exile later explained that their continued support for the Simba rebels was mostly motivated by the fact that they were being expelled from other countries such as Burundi, making this "the only choice we had". Despite this, their working relationship with the Congolese insurgents became more strained. The Simba rebels also alienated the Banyamulenge who lived in South Kivu during this time, as the retreating insurgents killed the Banyamulenge's cows for food. Despite being related to ethnic Rwandans, the Banyamulenge had previously tried to remain neutral and now opted to side with the Congolese government. They organized militias and began to hunt for the rebels. By April 1965, several thousand pro-Simba Rwandan militants operated in eastern Congo, but their support did little to stem the ANC's advance.

By May 1965, the Simbas had lost a majority of their territory in northeastern Congo. Despite this, the Cubans attempted to improve the training and organization of the Congolese and Rwandan insurgents. In late June, Kabila ordered a first Cuban-Simba-Rwandan attack aimed at the ANC garrison of Bendera. The operation (which was opposed by Che Guevara) failed completely, with the Rwandans being particularly poorly motivated and fleeing upon the first sign of combat. However, the Cubans continued their training and the performance of the rebels began to improve, resulting in a series of well-organized ambushes against ANC targets. However, these successes came at a significant cost. One Rwandan rebel leader told Che Guevara that he was losing so many of his fighters that the exiles' plans to invade Rwanda in future had become almost impossible.

Map of Simba rebellion in Congo, March – July 1965

The ANC launched another campaign, "Operation South", in September 1965 against the last major Simba stronghold which was located at Fizi-Baraka in South Kivu. Despite the occasional rebel success, the ANC and the mercenaries continued their advance, and began to cut off the insurgents from their supply roues across Lake Tanganyika. This forced the rebels to make stands and face the government forces head-on in battles in which they were disadvantaged. The final Simba stronghold near Bukavu held out for a month. It was captured only after the Simba force had killed several thousand civilians. Morale among the rebels plummeted, and many Rwandans wanted to quit the conflict. As local farmers also turned against the Simbas, showing insurgent camps to the government troops, the Cubans realized that no revolution would occur in the Congo. In November 1965, the Communist Cubans left the Congo in a nightly evacuation. At this point, the Simba rebellion was effectively defeated. According to historian Gérard Prunier, most of the remaining Simba rebels were "slaughter[ed]" by the ANC, mercenaries, and Banyamulenge militias. Many Simbas and their families were able to escape into exile; some ultimately relocated to Cuba.

== Clearing out Simba holdouts ==
Though the Simba rebellion had been defeated, remnants of rebels continued to operate; however, in their weakened state, they no longer posed a significant threat to the Congolese government, waging a low-level guerrilla war from bases in remote frontier regions. Of the rebel leadership, Kabila and Soumialot continued to support the remaining insurgents from their exile in Tanzania. In contrast, Gbenye and Olenga initially became businessmen in Sudan and Uganda. They made peace with Mobutu and returned to the Congo in 1971. Soumialot was probably killed by his own troops while waging an insurgency in the Fizi-Baraka area of the Congo in the late 1960s. Notable Simba holdouts were located in the western Virunga Mountains (these forces eventually became the Parti de Libération Congolais) and in South Kivu (Kabila's People's Revolution Party). The Rwandan exiles no longer played a significant role in the Simba holdouts. Some exiled Simbas resumed their insurgency in the 1980s or 1990s. Notable examples include the Front for the Liberation of Congo – Patrice Lumumba (FLC-L) and André Kisase Ngandu's forces.

Some of the Simba holdouts continued to be active until the First Congo War in 1996/97 when Kabila became President of the Congo. Ex-Simbas played a major role in Kabila's government until his assassination in 2001.

=== Orientale province ===
Government operations against remaining Simba groups, 1966 – 1969

On 6 March 1966 government forces recaptured Ponthierville (modern Ubundu) which had been under rebel control since August 1964. One day later 200 rebels with Chinese made rifles were captured near Poko. On 13 April government captured Bondo and Opala in the north, followed by Bafwasende on 5 May. In June 1966 government forces entered Batama.

On 27 May 1967, while being chased by government forces, Simba leader General Gaston Ngalo killed Winnie Davies, a European nun he had been holding hostage since 1964. Father Alphonse Strijbosh managed to escape; he was the last European hostage in rebel hands.

On 8 January 1969 Gaston Ngalo was captured and subsequently executed in Kisangani.

=== South Kivu ===
In April 1966, Operation South's Phase Two was launched. At first, 5 Commando under Major Peters advanced along Lake Tanganyika to Uvira, paralleled by a mixed force of 6 Commando and 5 Infantry Battalion to the west. These two columns cleared rebels on their pathway. After two months of fighting, Phase Three was initiated. At this point, 5 Commando, 9 Commando, 8 Infantry Battalion, 13 Infantry Battalion, and two platoons of 6 Commando were gathered in Uvira. They then advanced along the Ruzizi River to Bukavu. Meanwhile, other 6 Commando elements and 5 Infantry Battalion moved to link up with the ANC garrison at Mwenga.

The remaining Simba rebels were mainly concentrated along the Pende-Mende-Wamaza-Kongolo road, where they still enjoyed substantial local support. On 14 July, this area was designated as the area for Operation South's Phase Four to contain and eliminate the last insurgents. However, this phase was never carried out due to the outbreak of the Stanleyville mutinies.

== Aftermath ==
=== Effects on the Congo ===
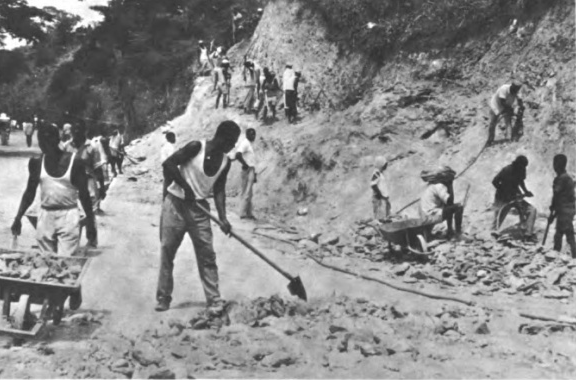
Economic rehabilitation project in Albertville following the Simba rebellion, 1965

The Banyamulenge's involvement in the conflict would result in lasting ethnic resentment in South Kivu, as the Simba insurgents of the region had mostly belonged to the Bembe people. Accordingly, the memory of the Banyamulenge-Simba fighting became ethnically charged, a development which was further fuelled by the Banyamulenge exploiting their victory over the rebels by expanding their holdings in South Kivu after the rebellion. The local ethnic rivalries would have a major impact on the First and Second Congo War.

=== Regional impact ===
The decision to aid the Simbas divided the Ugandan government, as it strained relations with the Congolese government and with the United States. It also created differences between the Ugandan national government and the sub-national Bugandan government. A Ugandan Member of Parliament later accused Colonel Amin of taking advantage of the situation to embezzle funds allocated for aid to Gbenye and smuggling gold, coffee, and ivory from the Congo, triggering the Gold Scandal. Several ex-Simba rebels were eventually enlisted in the Uganda Army after Idi Amin seized power in Uganda in 1971.

Burundi–Congolese relations were deeply strained throughout the conflict and were not normalised until January 1966. Thousands of Simba rebels fled to Burundi. Many of them joined with Hutu militants in a revolt against President Michel Micombero in 1972.

=== Cuban-Congolese community ===
The emigration of about 500 ex-Simbas to Cuba after the rebellion, as well as the subsequent intermarriage between ethnic Cubans and ex-Simbas, resulted in the emergence of a Cuban-Congolese community. Marked by a unique blend of Cuban and Congolese cultures, this community spread beyond Cuba, as some Cuban-Congolese ultimately returned to Africa or relocated to other parts of the world. Many ex-Simbas greatly profited from the better education opportunities in Cuba, and integrated well into the society of their host country. Despite being relatively small, the community has played a major part in modern Congolese politics due to the influence of Cuba-based ex-Simbas on the first post-Mobutu government of the Congo.
