= 6 Commando (Democratic Republic of the Congo) =

Mercenary unit of the Congolese National Army

6 Commando ANC
- Active: 1964 - 1967
- Country: Democratic Republic of the Congo
- Type: Mercenary
- Size: 5 Company
- Nickname: "les affreux" (Fr: the terrible ones)

Commanders
- Commander: Lt.Col. Lamouline
- Commander: Robert (Bob) Denard, until January 1963, and again from February 1965

6 Commando was a mercenary unit of the Armée Nationale Congolaise (the Congolese National Army) in the Democratic Republic of the Congo that trained as commando. It specialized in counterinsurgency, direct action behind enemy lines, irregular warfare, long-range penetration, special reconnaissance, and tracking the enemy to combat or gathering intelligence.

== Formation and organization ==
6 Commando was formed in August 1964 from mercenaries originally recruited in France, Belgium and Italy for 5 Commando. They were initially under command of Lt. Col. Lamouline, a regular Belgian officer and subsequently led by French mercenary, Robert "Bob" Denard. 6 Commando members are trained to be capable of commando equivalents, their abilities were no different from the previously established 4 Commando and 5 Commando.

6 Commando was organized into company sized units, each known as a "Choc" (French for "shock"). As at the time of the mercenary revolt in 1967, the 'Choc' or Company organization was:

- 1 Company: Maj. Karl Couke (killed 1 August 1967) – stationed in Lebo
- 2 Company: Capt. Christian Laboudigue – stationed in Stanleyville
- 3 Company: Maj. Hubert Pinaton – stationed in Panga
- 4 Company: Capt Faugere – (11 July 1967 wounded and evacuated to Angola) – stationed in Aketi.
- 5 Company: Maj. Robert "Bob" Noddyn - stationed in Uvira

The Commando never exceeded 550 men and was frequently plagued with troubles arising from the irregularity of pay. The fact that it was formed from a wide range of different nationalities exacerbated these problems that became visible in morale, discipline and effectiveness, to such an extent that at times (at Paulis in March 1965) it was in such disarray that it was in no position to deploy.

== Activities in Congo ==
The Commando was to work in close co-operation with the A.N.C, in particular with their Katangese units. The Commando played a major role in the pacification of Stanleyville and were able to work in close liaison with the Belgian High Command.

After the Stanleyville actions and once the mercenary forces had taken control of the city, a large part of 6 Commando was sent to reinforce twenty-six A.N.C. garrisons with the Commando scattered all over the north and east of the country (i.e. 100 Spanish mercenaries were patrolling the Central African Republic border while the French and Belgians were based around Stanleyville). Because of this fragmentation, 6 Commando never earned a reputation as an efficient fighting force equal to that of 5 Commando. However, as was the case in 5 Commando, 6 Commando chocs regularly faced disciplinary problems and their loyalty to the Congolese Government proved questionable.

== Mutiny and disbanding ==
The mutiny of members of 6 Commando at Kisangani had convinced Mobutu that the mercenaries were capable of turning against him in the future and he decided to get rid of them without delay. By January 1967, 6 Commando had been reduced to 500 men, but the mercenaries had little to do as the rebels presented no resistance beyond simple banditry, encouraging the Congo government to speed up the disbandment.
