= 5 Commando (Democratic Republic of the Congo) =

5 Commando (Congo mercenary unit)

5 Commando ANC
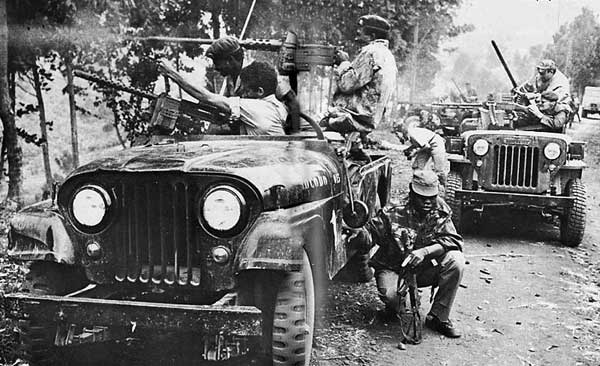
- Armée Nationale Congolaise and mercenaries, pictured during the Simba rebellion
- Active: 1964–1967
- Country: Democratic Republic of the Congo
- Type: Mercenary
- Engagements: Simba rebellion

Commanders
- Commander: Mike Hoare (1964 – 9 December 1965)
- Commander: John Peters (9 December 1965 – 26 March 1967)

5 Commando was a mercenary unit of the Congolese National Army (French: Armée Nationale Congolaise [ANC]) formed in response to the Simba rebellion; they were trained to be commandos and had their own air support unit. 5 Commando was active from 1964 to 1967.

== Mercenary recruitment ==
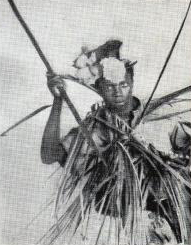
A Simba rebel with traditional clothing and weaponry. Poorly armed, the insurgents often placed an emphasis on magical protection to terrify and overwhelm their opponents.

In December 1963, a Maoist-inspired rebellion called the Kwilu rebellion broke out in the Kwilu Province of the Democratic Republic of the Congo. It began as a tribal dispute and then grew to a challenge against the central government. Although it remained relatively minor, it marked the start of a spreading wave of rebellions against the contemporary central government. As unrest spread, leftist rebels established a Committee for National Liberation in Kivu, inspired by the late Patrice Lubumba. In 1964, Moïse Tshombe returned from self-exile in Spain and declared himself to be the only person who could bring about unity between the warring factions. His popularity and political acumen led him to being appointed as Prime Minister on 6 July 1964. (Note: Tshombe had led the secession of the State of Katanga in July 1960 which collapsed after nearly three years of intermittent fighting with the Congolese National Army and United Nations Operation in the Congo. It was here that Tshombe had encountered the mercenary groups led by Jean Schramme, Jerry Puren (also spelled as Gerry Puren) and Mike Hoare.)

By August, the rebellion had turned to limited civil war, and Soviet and Cuban Communist-backed Simba rebels were marching on Stanleyville, taking control of the city on 5 August 1964. The defeat of the ANC at Stanleyville and capitulation of the capital city of Orientale Province came as a shock to the government, to Belgium, and to the United States. However, unlike the case of the secessionist uprising of 1961, in this case the United Nations and the United States expressed less willingness to engage in direct intervention against the rebels. Based on Tshombe's 1961 experiences in Katanga, as well as America's reluctance for direct involvement, Prime Minister Tshombe contracted mercenaries to address the rebellion.

== Formation ==
In July 1964, Jerry Puren (a former mercenary officer in the Katangese Air Force) started recruiting mercenaries to support the ANC on request of the Congolese Prime Minister Moïse Tshombe. Puren focused his efforts in South Africa and alerted 200 men of possible employment as mercenaries. An ex-British military officer, Mike Hoare, had known Tshombe and had served as one of his officers in 1961, and he was now designated commander of the mercenary force. (Note: Hoare had commanded 4 Commando during the Katanga secession.) Puren was to be in charge of air operations. Second in command was former executive officer of the Rhodesian Special Air Services, Alastair Wicks, who had also served with both Hoare and Tshombe in 1961.

Recruitment centers for the new force were established in South Africa and in both Northern and Southern Rhodesia. Hoare placed newspaper ads in the South African Johannesburg Star newspaper and in Salisbury newspapers (modern Harare, Zimbabwe) calling upon physically fit white men "...capable of marching 20 miles per day and who were fond of combat and were "tremendous romantics" to join 5 Commando." Contracts were for six months and basic pay was advertised at US$280 (equivalent to $2,907 in 2025) per month plus US$420 (equivalent to $4,360 in 2025) danger pay and 37,000 Congolese francs as a monthly allowance. NCOs received basic pay of US$400 (equivalent to $4,152 in 2025) and senior officers were compensated with US$1,100 (equivalent to $11,419 in 2025) in USD per month. Compensation of US$19,000 (equivalent to $197,237 in 2025) was payable to next of kin in the event of death.

"Adventurers" from South Africa, many of whom had fought with Moise Tshombe in the secession of Katanga Province, signed up, as did recruits from Rhodesia and Nyasaland. The Congolese, as well as officials of other African states, deeply resented the recruitment of South Africans and Rhodesians; this led to Tshombe's frequently assuring the Organisation of African Unity that he would replace the white mercenaries with African replacements as soon as they could be recruited and trained. 5 Commando eventually comprised volunteers from South Africa, Rhodesia, the United Kingdom, Belgium and Germany. Hoare described the men from the initial batch of recruits as being of "alarmingly low" standard with a "...high proportion of alcoholics, drunks, booze artists, bums and layabouts." He also complained about drug addicts and homosexuals among the recruits. Belgian colonels Frédéric Vandewalle and Louis Marlière expressed similar doubts about the quality of the recruits, with the latter commenting that they were "pirates who are not worth anything in battle." United States Ambassador George Godley described the unit as "an uncontrolled lot of toughs [...] who consider looting or safe-cracking fully within their prerogatives."

Organizationally, 5 Commando was divided into eight sub-units, designated 51 to 58 Commando, with two officers and three sergeants per sub-unit; these were reinforced, platoon-sized units. The first orders issued to Hoare by the chief of the ANC, Major General Joseph Desire Mobutu instructed Hoare to: 1.) Deploy a company of 200 immediately to Kamina with the mission to retake Manono, Albertville, Fizi and Uvira. 2.) Designate 300 volunteers formed into six platoons for the six mobile groups that had been planned and 3.) Assign 500 volunteers in a company with elements of the ANC to immediately retake Stanleyville. By 2 September 1964 recruiting had stopped as 1,000 recruits had been signed up, but the facilities, training and organization of 5 Commando made the attainment of the first orders highly unlikely.

The Belgian government dispatched Colonel Vandewalle to the Congo; during a meeting with Tshombe, Vandewalle clarified he would not tolerate political interference with military operations. Consequently, he was given authority to work directly with the Belgian logistics units, the CIA's air support, and the mercenaries. As a result, Belgian logistics units supported 5 Commando by providing them with weapons, ammunition, trucks and uniforms. After a few weeks of training, 5 Commando went into combat.

== Operations ==
Early on, 5 Commando was plagued by poor logistics and a lack of discipline. A few days after the first group of mercenaries for the unit in the Congo, Hoare launched two attacks against the Simba-held city of Albertville. Both were repulsed. The lack of equipment, inadequate training, and irregularities in pay damaged the unit's morale and the unit incurred a high casualty rate. Over the course of late 1964, the Congolese government improved the financial and logistical situation while Hoare screened out soldiers he deemed unfit. By the end of the year, 5 Commando still suffered from disciplinary problems. By early 1965, the Congolese government had driven rebels out of much of the eastern Congo, but the situation remained unstable. The 5 Commando group was tasked with securing the border, reestablishing lines of communication, and clearing out pockets of resistance, especially in the Fizi-Baraka and Uvari areas.

5 Commando played a significant role in rescuing hostages, particularly European hostages, from Simba rebels. These actions frequently made headlines in Europe and made the mercenaries popular heroes for a limited period. In contrast to these heroic headlines, the mercenaries supplemented their wages by searching bodies for cash and robbing banks in Stanleyville.

5 Commando received ongoing support from the United States' CIA through air support operations as well as by providing and crewing Swift boats for operations on Lake Tanganyika. The boats were used to support 5 Commando (often under 5 Commando command) and were crewed by Miami-Cuban, anti-Castro crews, recruited by and paid by the CIA. The United States insisted that there be "no overt relationship with the mercenaries," but this relationship between the CIA and 5 Commando could not be kept secret. This was further evidenced by frequent meetings between Mike Hoare and later John Peters (Note: Peters had been commander of 53 Commando prior to Hoare leaving the Congo.) and the CIA Congo Station Chief, Larry Devlin. Besides tactical support, the United States provided F-250 trucks and 7-ton cargo vehicles for operational use by the mercenaries.

Peters assumed command of 5 Commando from Hoare in December 1965. Georg Schroeder late assumed command from him.

== Alleged war crimes ==
The 5 Commando were known for unsanctioned killing, torture, looting and rape in recaptured rebel areas. In a press interview, Hoare described his men as "appalling thugs." Some South African members of the unit were later convicted of manslaughter by Congolese courts.

== Disbandment ==
=== Military coup and ousting of Tshombe ===
5 Commando became highly efficient in working with the ANC troops and they cleared eastern Congo of Simba rebels. They almost captured Che Guevara in his camp, forcing him to escape to Tanzania, but these victories came at a political cost. On 13 October 1965, Congolese President Joseph Kasa-Vubu relieved Prime Minister Tshombe of his duties and replaced him with Évariste Kimba, considering Tshombe too ambitious and too unpopular both in the country and in neighboring African states. Mobutu shortly thereafter removed both President Kasavubu and Prime Minister Kimba in a coup, appointing himself President. Tshombe had been a friend of, and protector to, 5 and 6 Commando, so his ousting immediately caused uncertainty and insecurity within 5 Commando. Jerry Puren left the Congo with Tshombe for exile in Belgium. Mike Hoare and Alistair Wicks did not renew their contracts and left the Congo. John Peters, then commanding officer of 5 Commando, continued to pledge his—and the unit's—loyalty to the government and continued operations in southern Congo.

=== Mercenary revolt ===
Jerry Puren, once in Belgium, was informed of a plan to reinstall Tshombe as Prime Minister. The Baka Regiment of the ANC, together with the mercenary commandos led by Jean Schramme and by Bob Denard, had committed to support the plan. Puren refused to take part in the counter-coup and Mike Hoare, Alistair Wicks, John Peters and Hugh van Oppen (Peters and van Oppen were still serving members of 5 Commando) were approached to support the revolt but all refused. (Note: van Oppen was earmarked to replace Lieutenant Colonel John Peters as the commander of 5 Commando but he was murdered on 13 May 1966 for allegedly supporting the planned revolt.) On 23 July, the Baka Regiment and 11, 12, 13 and 14 Commandos revolted to support the exiled Tshombe, killing the commander of the ANC and taking control of the radio station in Stanleyville. 6 Commando, led by Bob Denard, opposed the uprising and notified the government; they called for support to put down the uprising. A stalemate ensued in Stanleyville until September 1966, when Denard attacked the Katanga units in the city. 5 Commando re-deployed from southern Congo to support 6 Commando to cover any Katanga escape routes from the city. A truce was negotiated and those Katanga troops who were not killed were given amnesty, while officers were transported to prisons in Elisabethville. The rebellion had failed and Mobutu remained secure as president. The failed rebellion did, however, reinforce perceptions that 5 and 6 Commando were loyal to Mobutu.

After this failed revolt, Puren (still in Belgium) started his own plan to reinstall Tshombe, selecting Jean Schramme of 10 Commando to lead the second revolt. After much planning, including Denard in the planning, Schramme launched surprise attacks on Stanleyville, Bukavu and Kindu. Stanleyville and Bukavu were taken with little resistance, but the mercenaries faced stronger resistance in Kindu. ANC forces recovered Stanleyville, executing several mercenaries, and Schramme withdrew from the city to establish a stronghold in Bukavu. Mobutu issued an ultimatum, ordering Schramme to evacuate Bukavu within ten days. The ANC attacked when the ultimatum expired; on 5 November 1966, Schramme, together with 150 mercenaries, 800 Katanga soldiers and 1,500 women and children fled across the Rwandan border and were disarmed and interned by the Rwandan military at Shangugu. The second mercenary revolt had also collapsed. Elsewhere in other skirmishes, many mercenaries were massacred and surviving European mercenaries were evacuated by the Red Cross.

=== Disbandment ===
Mobutu ordered all recruitment for 5 Commando to cease in March 1967; the unit was disbanded in April on Mobutu's order. He likely did so for three reasons: to avoid the expense of paying the mercenaries, to forestall any attempts by Tshombe to use the unit in a further coup attempt, and to avoid the potential embarrassment of employing white mercenaries when the Congo was due to host an upcoming Organisation of African Unity annual conference in September.

== In popular culture ==
- The film The Wild Geese, made in 1978: directed by Andrew V. McLaglen and starring Richard Burton, Roger Moore, Richard Harris, and Hardy Krüger was based on the formation and tribulations of Mike Hoare and 5 Commando.
