= Mad Mike Hoare =

British-Irish military officer and mercenary (1919–2020)

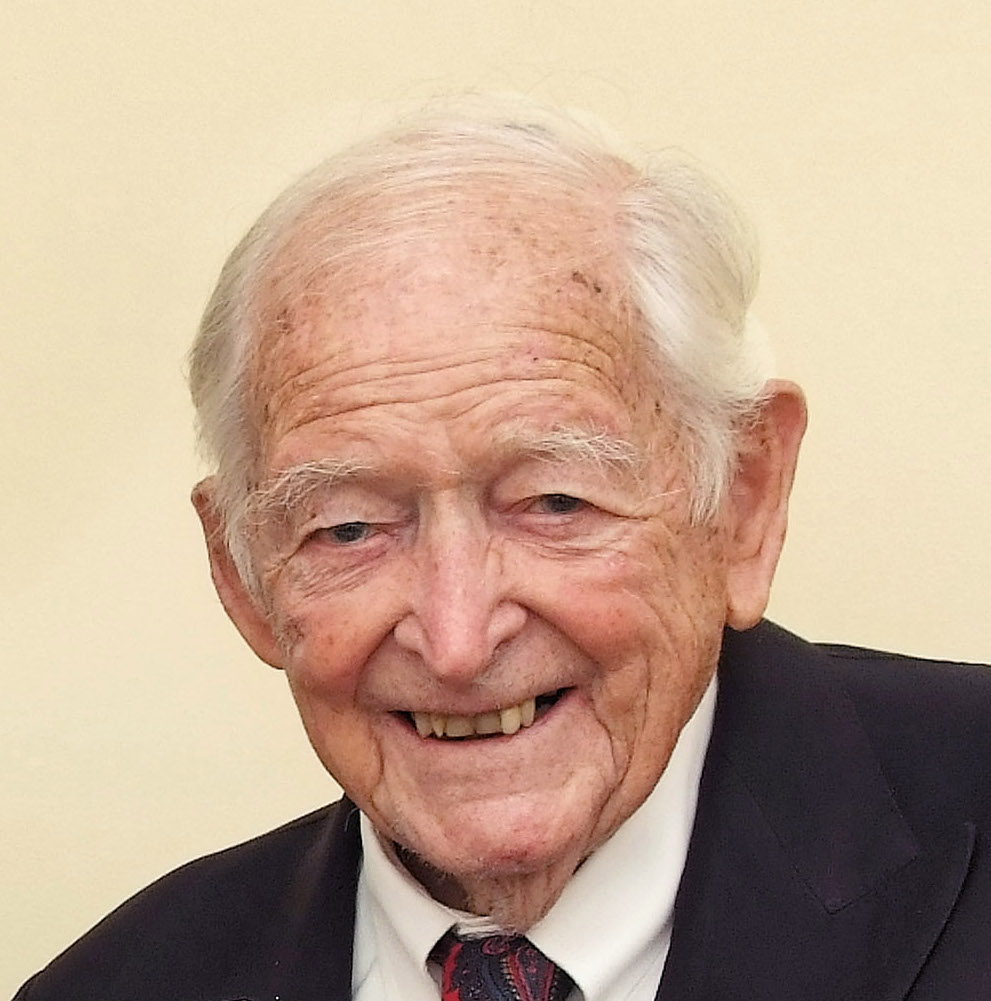
- Mike Hoare, June 2018
- Born: Thomas Michael Hoare; 17 March 1919; Calcutta, British India
- Died: 2 February 2020 (aged 100); Durban, South Africa
- Spouses: Elizabeth Stott (m. 1945; div. 1961) Phyllis Sims (m. 1961)
- Children: 5
- Military career
- Allegiance: United Kingdom
- Branch: British Army
- Rank: Colonel
- Units: London Irish Rifles
- Wars: Second World War; Burma Campaign
- Mercenary career
- Allegiance: Katanga; Congo-Léopoldville; South Africa
- Nickname: "Mad Mike"
- Battles: Congo Crisis; Katanga secession; Simba rebellion; Operation Angela

Thomas Michael "Mad Mike" Hoare (17 March 1919 – 2 February 2020) was a British-Irish military officer and mercenary who fought during the Simba rebellion and was involved in carrying out the 1981 Seychelles coup d'état attempt.

== Early life and military career ==
Hoare was born on Saint Patrick's Day in India in Calcutta to Irish parents. His father was a river pilot. At the age of eight he was sent to school in England to Margate College and then commenced training for accountancy and, as he was not able to attend Sandhurst, he joined the Territorial Army. Hoare's childhood hero was Sir Francis Drake. Aged 20 he joined the London Irish Rifles at the beginning of the Second World War, later he then joined the 2nd Reconnaissance Regiment of the Royal Armoured Corps as a 2nd lieutenant and fought in the Arakan Campaign in Burma and at the Battle of Kohima in India. He was promoted to the rank of major. In 1945, he married Elizabeth Stott in New Delhi, with whom he had three children.

After the war, he completed his training as a chartered accountant, qualifying in 1948. Hoare found life in London boring and decided to move to South Africa. He quit accountancy and managed a motor car business. He subsequently emigrated to Durban, Natal Province in the Union of South Africa. In Durban, Hoare was restless and sought adventures by marathon walking, riding a motorcycle from Cape Town to Cairo in 1954 and seeking the rumoured Lost City of the Kalahari in the Kalahari desert. In 1959 he established a safari business in the Kalahari and the Okavango delta. A keen sailor, he had a yacht in Durban, then later bought a 23-metre Baltic trader named Sylvia in which he sailed the Western Mediterranean for three years with his family and wrote a book about the travels. By the early 1960s, Hoare was extremely bored with his life as an accountant, and yearned to return to the life of a soldier, resulting in his interest in becoming a mercenary.

== Congo Crisis (1961–65) ==
Hoare commanded two separate mercenary groups during the Congo Crisis.

=== Katanga ===
Hoare's first mercenary action was in 1961 in Katanga, a province trying to rebel from the newly independent Republic of the Congo. His unit was named "4 Commando". Hoare relished the macho camaraderie of war, telling one journalist "you can't win a war with choirboys".

During this time he married Phyllis Sims, an airline stewardess.

=== Simba rebellion ===
In 1964, Congolese Prime Minister Moïse Tshombe, his employer in Katanga, hired Hoare to command a military unit named 5 Commando, Armée Nationale Congolaise (ANC) 5 Commando, later commanded by John Peters; composed of about 300 men, most of whom were from South Africa. His second-in-command was a fellow ex-British Army officer, Commandant Alistair Wicks. The unit's mission was to fight a revolt known as the Simba rebellion. Tshombe distrusted General Joseph-Désiré Mobutu, the commander of the Armée Nationale Congolaise who had already commanded two coups, and preferred to keep the Congolese Army weak even during the Simba rebellion. Hence, Tshombe used mercenaries who had already fought for him in Katanga to provide a professional military force.

"The idea that a racial war by white mercenaries against Africans would be subject to the Geneva Conventions would have been laughed at by Hoare, who casually described war crimes by his forces. Captured rebels were forced to walk across a minefield [...] The mercenaries had no problems burning entire villages to the ground and killing their populations."

— Historian Justin Podur, York University

To recruit his force, Hoare placed newspaper advertisements in Johannesburg and Salisbury (modern Harare, Zimbabwe) for physically fit white men capable of marching 20 miles per day who were fond of combat and were "tremendous romantics" to join 5 Commando. The moniker Mad Mike which was given to him by the British press suggested a "wildman" type of commander, but in fact Hoare was very strict and insisted the men of 5 Commando always be clean-shaven, keep their hair cut short, never swear and attend church services every Sunday. The men of 5 Commando were entirely white and consisted of a "ragbag of misfits" upon whom he imposed stern discipline. 5 Commando was a mixture of South Africans, Rhodesians, British, Belgians, Irish and Germans, the last of whom were mostly Second World War veterans who had arrived in the Congo wearing Iron Crosses. Racist views towards blacks were very common in 5 Commando, but in press interviews, Hoare denied allegations of atrocities against the Congolese.

Despite his denials, an observer stated "anything black was killed indiscriminately, blindly" by Hoare's mercenaries. Hoare himself told journalists "Killing communists is like killing vermin. Killing African nationalists is like killing animals. I don’t like either of them. My men and I killed between five and ten thousand Congolese rebels during the twenty months I spent in the Congo".

To the press, Hoare insisted that the 5 Commando were not mercenaries, but rather "volunteers" who were waging an idealistic struggle against Communism in the Congo. Tshombe paid the men of 5 Commando the equivalent of $1,100 U.S. dollars per month. Hoare always argued that he was a "romantic" who was fighting in the Congo for martial "glory", and insisted that for him the money was irrelevant. Whatever may have been Hoare's motivation, his men showed rapacious greed in the Congo, being noted for their looting and a tendency to steal equipment from the United Nations forces in the Congo. Due to his pride in his Irish heritage, Hoare adopted a flying goose as the symbol of 5 Commando and called his men the Wild Geese after the famous Irish soldiers who fought for the Stuarts in exile during the 17th and 18th centuries. Hoare was known for coolness and courage under fire as he believed that the best way to inspire his men, some of whom wilted under fire, was to command from the front. He put a stop to a mutiny among his commandoes by pistol-whipping the commander of the mutiny.

Hoare brought his men south and then turned north in a swiftly moving offensive, assisted with aircraft flown by Cuban emigres. A particular specialty for Hoare was hijacking boats to take up the river Congo as he began rescuing hostages from the Simbas. The Simbas were badly disciplined, poorly trained, and often not armed with modern weapons, and for all these reasons, the well-armed, trained and disciplined 5 Commando had a great effect on the Simba rebellion. The British journalist A.J. Venter who covered the Congo crisis wrote as Hoare advanced, "the fighting grew progressively more brutal" with few prisoners taken. Hoare's advance was aided by the roads in the Congo remaining from Belgian colonial rule still being usable in 1964–65. Hoare's men tended to collect the heads of Simbas and stick them to the sides of their jeeps.

Later Hoare and his mercenaries worked in concert with Belgian paratroopers, Cuban exile pilots, and CIA-hired mercenaries who attempted to save 1,600 civilians (mostly Europeans and missionaries) in Stanleyville (modern Kisangani, Congo) from the Simba rebels in Operation Dragon Rouge. Hoare and the 5 Commando are estimated to have saved the lives of 2,000 Europeans taken hostage by the Simbas, which made him famous around the world. Many of the hostages had been so badly treated as to barely resemble humans, which added to the fame of Hoare, who was presented in the Western press as a hero. He wrote about Stanleyville as occupied by the Simbas: "The mayor of Stanleyville, Sylvere Bondekwe, a greatly respected and powerful man, was forced to stand naked before a frenzied crowd of Simbas while one of them cut out his liver." About Operation Dragon Rouge, he wrote: "Taking Stanleyville was the greatest achievement of the Wild Geese. There is only so much 300 men can do, but here we were, part of a very big push and clearing the rebels out of Stan was a major victory for our side." Hoare did not stop his men from sacking Stanleyville as the 5 Commando blew open the vaults of every bank and confiscated the alcohol in every tavern in the city.

Hoare was later promoted to lieutenant-colonel in the ANC and 5 Commando expanded into a two-battalion force. Hoare commanded 5 Commando from July 1964 to November 1965. After completing his service, he told the media that he estimated that 5 Commando had killed between 5,000 and 10,000 Simbas. The Simbas had been advised by Cuban officers, and one of them was the Argentine Communist revolutionary Ernesto "Che" Guevara, which caused Hoare to claim he was the first man to have defeated Che Guevara.

Speaking on the conflict, he said, "I had wanted nothing so much as to have 5 Commando known as an integral part of the ANC, a 5 Commando destined to strike a blow to rid the Congo of the greatest cancer the world has ever known—the creeping, insidious disease of communism".

Later, Hoare wrote his own account of 5 Commando's role in the 1960s Congo mercenary war, originally titled Congo Mercenary and much later repeatedly republished in paperback simply as Mercenary (subtitled "The Classic Account of Mercenary Warfare"). The exploits of Hoare and 5 Commando in the Congo were much celebrated for decades afterward and helped contribute significantly to the glorification of the mercenary lifestyle by magazines such as Soldier of Fortune together with many pulp novels that featured heroes clearly modeled after Hoare. The popular image of mercenaries fighting in Africa from the 1960s to the present is that of a macho adventurers defiantly living life on their own terms together with much drinking and womanizing mixed with perilous adventures.

== The Wild Geese ==
During the mid-1970s, Hoare was hired as technical adviser for the movie The Wild Geese, the fictional story of a group of mercenary soldiers hired to rescue a deposed African president who resembled Tshombe while the central African nation the story was set in resembled the Congo. The character "Colonel Allen Faulkner" (played by Richard Burton) was modelled on Hoare. At least one of the actors of the movie, Ian Yule, had been a mercenary commanded by Hoare, before which he had served in the British Parachute Regiment and Special Air Service (SAS). Of the actors playing mercenaries, four were born in Africa, two were former POWs, and most had received military training.

In an interview, Hoare praised The Wild Geese as an authentic picture of the mercenary lifestyle in Africa saying: "In a good mercenary outfit, they're all there because they want to be. All right, the motive is probably the high money they earn, but they all want to do it. They're all volunteers". The movie's message that Africa needed pro-Western politicians like Tshombe and that mercenaries who fought for such politicians were heroes seemed to represent Hoare's influence.

== Seychelles affair (1981) and subsequent conviction ==
=== Background ===
In 1978, Seychelles exiles in South Africa, acting on behalf of ex-president James Mancham, discussed with South African Government officials the possibility of a coup d'état against the new president France-Albert René, who had "promoted" himself from prime minister while Mancham was out of the country. The idea was considered favourably by some in Washington, D.C., due to the United States' concerns over access to its new military base on Diego Garcia island, the necessity to move operations from the Seychelles to Diego Garcia, and the determination that René was not someone who would be in favour of the United States.

=== Preparation ===
Associates of Mancham contacted Hoare, then in South Africa as a civilian resident, who eventually raised a force of 43 - 55 men including ex-South African Special Forces (Recces), former Rhodesian soldiers, and ex-Congo mercenaries.

During November 1981, Hoare dubbed them "Ye Ancient Order of Froth Blowers" (AOFB) after a charitable English social club of the 1920s. In order for the plan to work, he disguised the mercenaries as a rugby club, and hid AK-47s in the bottom of their luggage, as he explained in his book The Seychelles Affair:

We were a Johannesburg beer-drinking club. We met formally once a week in our favourite pub in Braamfontein. We played Rugby. Once a year we organised a holiday for our members. We obtained special charter rates. Last year we went to Mauritius. In the best traditions of the original AOFB we collected toys for underprivileged kids and distributed them to orphanages ... I made sure the toys were as bulky as possible and weighed little. Rugger footballs were ideal. These were packed in the special baggage above the false bottom to compensate for the weight of the weapon.

=== Airport Fiasco ===
Upon arrival at the airport one of Hoare's men accidentally got into the "something to declare" line at which the customs officer insisted on searching his bag. The rifles were well-concealed in the false-bottomed kitbags; however, one rifle was found and a customs officer sounded the alarm. One of Hoare's men pulled his own, disassembled AK-47 from the concealed compartment in the luggage, assembled it, loaded it and shot the escaping customs man before he could reach the other side of the building.

The plan for the coup proceeded despite this set-back with one team of Hoare's men attempting to capture a barracks. Fighting ensued at the airport and during the middle of this, an Air India jet (Flight 224) landed at the airport, damaging a flap on one of the trucks strewn on the runway. Hoare managed to negotiate a ceasefire before the aircraft and passengers were caught in the crossfire. After several hours, the mercenaries found themselves in an unfavorable position and some wanted to depart on the aircraft, which needed fuel. Hoare conceded and the captain of the aircraft allowed them aboard after Hoare had found fuel for the aircraft.

On board, Hoare asked the captain why he had landed when he had been informed of the fighting, to which the pilot responded once the aircraft had started to descend he did not have enough fuel to climb the aircraft back to cruising altitude and still make his destination. Hoare's men still had their weapons and Hoare asked the captain if he would allow the door to be opened so they could ditch the weapons over the sea before they returned to South Africa, but the captain laughed at Hoare's out-of-date knowledge on how pressurized aircraft functioned, telling him it would not be at all possible.

=== Investigation and trial ===
Six of the mercenary soldiers stayed behind on the islands; four were convicted of treason in the Seychelles.

In January 1982 an International Commission, appointed by the United Nations Security Council in Resolution 496, inquired into the attempted coup d'état. The UN report concluded that South African defence agencies were involved, including supplying weapons and ammunition.

Being associated with the South African security services, the hijackers were initially charged with kidnapping, which carries no minimum sentence, but this was upgraded to hijacking after international pressure.

Hoare was found guilty of aeroplane hijacking and sentenced to ten years in prison. In total, 42 of the 43 alleged hijackers were convicted. One of the mercenaries, an American veteran of the Vietnam War, was found not guilty of hijacking, as he had been seriously wounded in the firefight and was loaded aboard while sedated. Many of the other mercenaries, including the youngest of the group, Raif St Clair, were quietly released after serving three months of their six-month terms in their own prison wing. Hoare spent 33 months in prison until released after a Christmas Presidential amnesty. During his 33 months in prison, Hoare consoled himself by memorising Shakespeare.

=== Aftermath ===
Hoare was a chartered accountant and member of the Institute of Chartered Accountants in England and Wales. Previously the Institute had said it could not expel him despite protests from members as he had committed no offence and paid his membership dues. His imprisonment allowed the ICAEW to expel him from membership in 1983.

Hoare's account of the Seychelles operation, The Seychelles Affair, was markedly critical of the South African establishment. In 2013, he published his seventh book, a historical novel entitled The Last Days of the Cathars about the medieval persecution of the Cathars in the south-west of France. During his last decades, Hoare had extensively studied the beliefs of the Cathars.

== Personal life ==
Hoare married Elizabeth Stott in New Delhi in 1945 and together they had three children.

After divorcing in 1960, he married airline stewardess Phyllis Sims in 1961 and they had two children.

Hoare was uncle to Irish-South African novelist Bree O'Mara (1968–2010). She wrote an account of Hoare's adventures as a mercenary in the Congo, which remained unpublished at the time of her death on Afriqiyah Airways Flight 771.

=== Death ===
Hoare died of natural causes at a care facility in Durban, on 2 February 2020.

== Writing ==
- Congo Mercenary, London: Hale (1967), ISBN 0-7090-4375-9; Boulder, Colorado: Paladin Press (reissue 2008, with new foreword), ISBN 978-1-58160-639-3; Durban: Partners in Publishing (2019)
- Congo Warriors, London: Hale (1991), ISBN 0-7090-4369-4; Boulder, Colorado: Paladin Press (reissue 2008, with new foreword, Durban: Partners in Publishing (2019);
- The Road to Kalamata: a Congo mercenary's personal memoir, Lexington, Mass.: Lexington Books (1989), ISBN 0-669-20716-0; Boulder, Colorado: Paladin Press (reissue 2008, with new foreword, ISBN 978-1-58160-641-6); Durban: Partners in Publishing (2019)
- The Seychelles Affair, Bantam, ISBN 0-593-01122-8; Boulder, CO: Paladin Press (reissue 2008, with new foreword); Durban: Partners in Publishing (2019)
- Three Years with Sylvia, London: Hale, ISBN 0-7091-6194-8; Boulder, Colorado: Paladin Press (reissue 2010, with new foreword); Durban: Partners in Publishing (2019)
- Mokoro – A Cry for Help! Durban North: Partners in Publishing (2007), ISBN 978-0-620-39365-2
- Mike Hoare′s Adventures in Africa, Boulder, Colorado: Paladin Press (2010), ISBN 978-1-58160-732-1; Durban: Partners in Publishing (2019)
- The Last Days of the Cathars, Durban: Partners in Publishing (2012 and 2019)

== See also ==
- Bob Denard
- Jean Schramme
- Simon Mann
- John Joel Glanton

== Bibliography ==
- Burke, Kyle (2018). Revolutionaries for the Right: Anticommunist Internationalism and Paramilitary Warfare in the Cold War. Chapel Hill: University of North Carolina Press. ISBN 978-1469640747.
- Venter, A.J. (2006). War Dog: Fighting Other People's Wars: The Modern Mercenary in Combat. New Delhi: Lancer Publishers. ISBN 8170621747.
- Podur, Justin (2020). America's wars on democracy in Rwanda and the DR Congo. Cham: Palgrave Macmillan. ISBN 9783030446994.
