= Nzimbi Ngbale =

Zairean general (1944–2005)

General Nzimbi Ngbale
- Étienne Nzimbi Ngbale Kongo wa Bassa
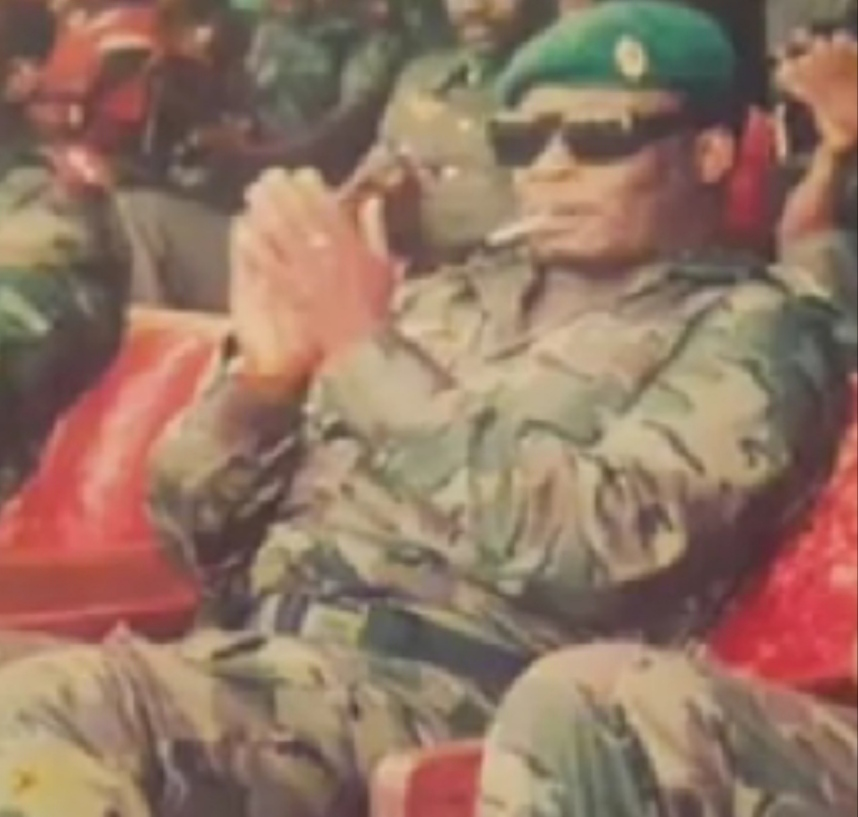
- Ngbale in 1990
- Born: December 6, 1944; Libenge, Belgian Congo (now Libenge, Democratic Republic of the Congo)
- Died: September 28, 2005 (age 60); Brussels, Belgium
- Relatives: Mobutu Sese Seko (cousin)
- Military career
- Allegiance: (Democratic Republic of the Congo) Congo-Léopoldville (1960s–1971); Zaire (1971–1997)
- Branch: Special Presidential Division (DSP)
- Rank: General
- Known for: Commander of the DSP
- Conflicts: Congo Crisis; Shaba I; Shaba II; Rwandan Civil War; First Congo War

Étienne Nzimbi Ngbale Kongo wa Bassa, better known as Nzimbi Ngbale, was a Zairean general who served in the Presidential Guard of Mobutu Sese Seko. Ngbale, who was Mobutu's cousin, served as the commander of the Special Presidential Division until the fall of Zaire in 1997.

== Biography ==
Ngbale was born in Libenge, Belgian Congo on December 6, 1944, to an ethnic Ngbandi family. He began his military career in the 1960s and 1970s, and received his military training from the Israeli Army. In the late 1970s, he took control of the Special Presidential Brigade (BSP), which later became the Special Presidential Division (DSP) protecting Mobutu Sese Seko from attempted coups. Ngbale's DSP was considered the most feared unit in the Zairean army, consisting of 6,000 to 10,000 men including foreign mercenaries. Ngbale heavily recruited men from the Ngbandi tribe to join the DSP. The DSP under Ngbale was also known for numerous human rights abuses, and the detention and torture of political opponents.

During the First Congo War as Kinshasa fell to Congolese rebels, Ngbale told Mobutu that he "could not defend him anymore." Ngbale, only in control of around 2,000 soldiers in the DSP, attempted to launch a missile on Mobutu's plane as he flew back to his palace in Gbadolite similar to the strike that killed Rwandan president Juvénal Habyarimana in 1994, but Mobutu had been tipped off about the attempted assassination.

Ngbale fled Kinshasa to Brazzaville by boat on May 17, 1997. The remaining soldiers of the DSP assassinated the Zairian chief of staff Donatien Mahele as he tried to calm troops that were preparing for an advance by Congolese rebels. Nzimbi died on September 28, 2005, in a Belgian hospital in Brussels, Belgium.
