= Bobi Ladawa Mobutu =

Second wife of Mobutu Sese Seko (born 1945)

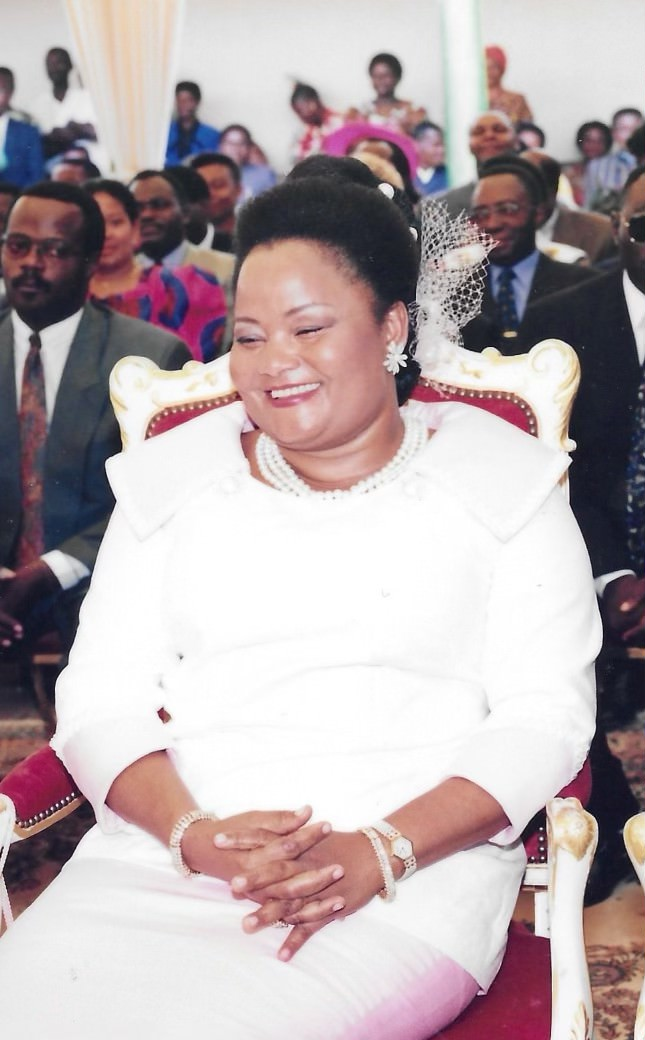
- Bobi Ladawa in 1995, at her son's wedding

First Lady of Zaire
- In office 1 May 1980 – 16 May 1997
- President: Mobutu Sese Seko
- Preceded by: Marie-Antoinette Mobutu
- Succeeded by: Sifa Mahanya

Personal details
- Born: Bobi Ladawa; 2 September 1945 (age 80) Dula, Équateur, Belgian Congo
- Party: Popular Movement of the Revolution; Union of Mobutist Democrats
- Spouse: Mobutu Sese Seko (m. 1980; died 1997)
- Children: 4, including Nzanga

Bobi Ladawa Mobutu (born 2 September 1945) also known as Mama Bobi Ladawa, is the second wife and widow of Mobutu Sese Seko who ruled Zaire (now the Democratic Republic of the Congo) as president between 1965 and 1997.

== Background ==
She was born at Dula in the western province of Équateur and attended a Roman Catholic convent school in the capital Kinshasa before embarking on a teaching career. In the 1970s, she became the mistress of President Mobutu. The couple had a total of four children - Nzanga, Giala, Toku and Ndokula - before his first wife, Marie-Antoinette, died in 1977. She married President Mobutu Sese Seko in both church and civil ceremonies on 1 May 1980, on the eve of a visit by Pope John Paul II. The pope refused Mobutu's request to officiate over the ceremony.

Bobi Ladawa Mobutu was known for promoting issues such as health, education and women's rights. She was also customarily addressed as "Citizen Bobi" or "Mama Bobi", and frequently accompanied her husband abroad. Reportedly, she was involved in the corruption that occurred during Mobutu's rule. In 1996, a government minister who feared that he was about to be sacked in an upcoming cabinet reshuffle flew to Mobutu's palace at Gbadolite to visit the president and his family, carrying a million US dollars in his briefcase as a gift for Bobi Ladawa. When the reshuffle came, he was promoted to deputy prime minister.

Mobutu was overthrown in May 1997 and fled into a luxurious exile, eased by the millions of US dollars that he had amassed during his rule. Bobi Ladawa accompanied him to his eventual final place of exile in Morocco, and was at his bedside when he died from prostate cancer in September 1997.

In 1998, Bobi Ladawa alongside her son, Nzanga, created the "Mobutu Foundation" in hopes of helping young men and women in Africa reach their full potential. She remains in exile, and reportedly divides her time between Rabat, where Mobutu is buried, Faro (in the Algarve, Portugal), Brussels, and Paris where she owns properties.
