= Ngbandi =

Ngbandi may refer to:

- the Ngbandi people
- the Ngbandi language
