= Kpama Baramoto Kata =

Kpama Baramoto Kata (born Yakoma, 1947) was a general of the Zairian Forces Armées Zaïroises.

He was Mobutu Sese Seko's brother-in-law, and served as army chief of staff. After Mobutu's regime collapsed in 1997 he fled to South Africa. The general, who was fired by Mobutu for incompetence in the face of persistent rebel victories, has been a target of military reprisals ever since he was sacked earlier in 1997. Baramoto, a former police officer, married a sister of Mobutu's first wife. He was the first commander of the Zairian Civil Guard from 1984.
