= Sango people =

Gabonian ethnic group

Sango
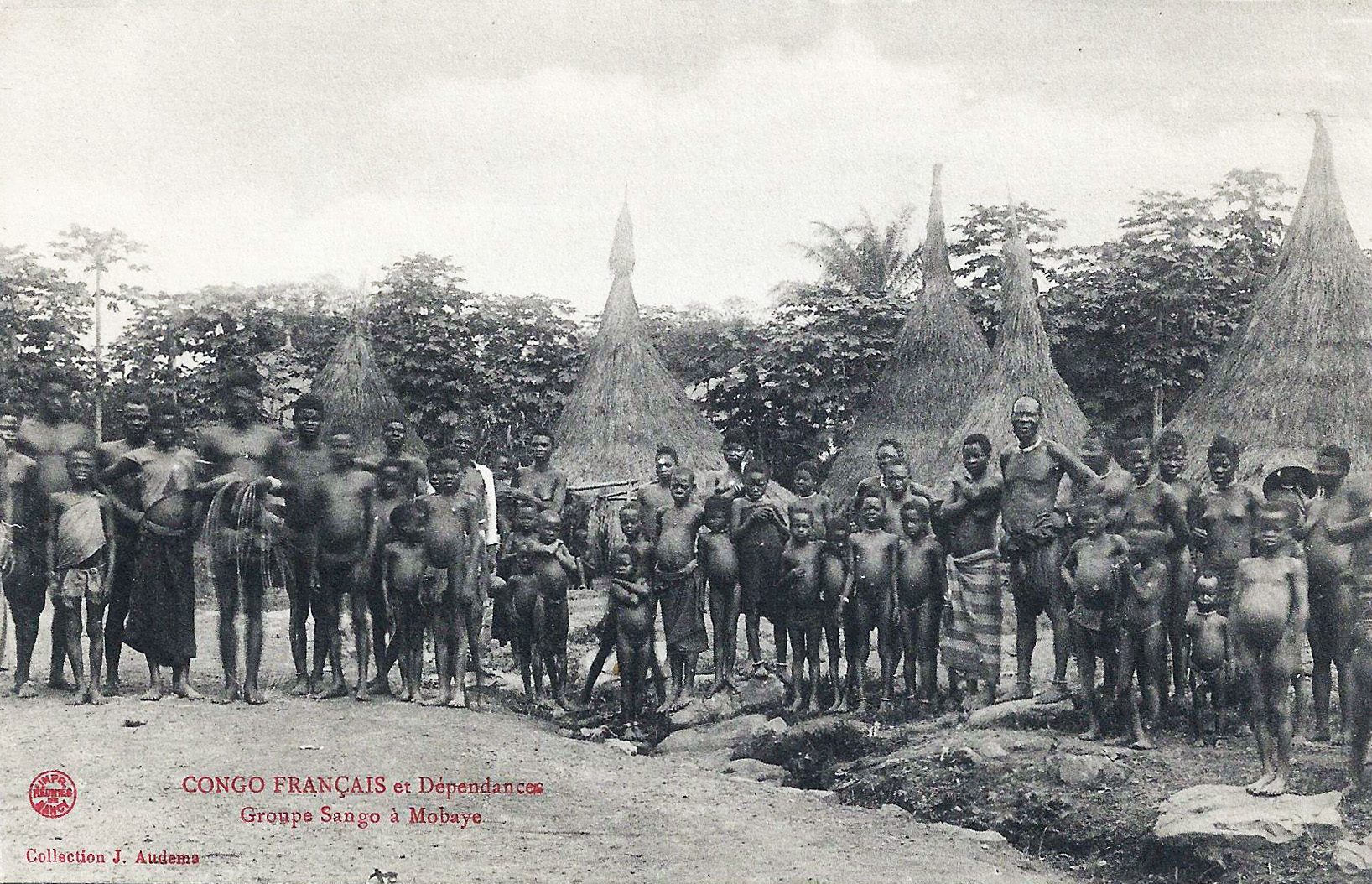
- Sango people in Mobaye (French Congo).

Total population
- Unknown

Regions with significant populations
- Central African Republic, Democratic Republic of the Congo

Languages
- Sango

Religion
- Christianity

The Sango people (or Basango, Bosango, Sangho, Sangos) are an ethnic group living on the banks of the Ubangi River in the Central African Republic. They speak a Northern Ngbandi-based creole language called Sango, which belongs to the Ubangian branch of the Niger-Congo family.

== See also ==
- List of ethnic groups of Africa

== Bibliography ==
- Pierre Kalck, "Sango", in Historical Dictionary of the Central African Republic, Scarecrow Press, 2005 (3rd ed.), p. 174 ISBN 9780810849136; reported by Auguste Chevalier in Journal des africanistes, 1936, 6-2, pp. 238–239.
- Antonin-Marius Vergiat, Les rites secrets des primitifs de l'Oubangui, Payot, 1936, reissued at L'Harmattan, Paris, 1981, 210 p. ISBN 2-85802-205-4
