= Presidential Brigade (disambiguation) =

Separate Presidential Brigade is a foot guard brigade in the Ukrainian Armed Forces structure.

Presidential Brigade may also refer to:

- 1st NG Operational Brigade (Ukraine), an operational, light mechanized, brigade in the National Guard of Ukraine structure
- 1st Presidential Brigade and 2nd Presidential Brigade, see Iraqi Ground Forces
- Special Presidential Brigade, Zaire
