= Kongulu Mobutu =

Son of Mobutu Sese Seko (1970–1998)

Ndolo Michel Mathieu Kongulu Mobutu (21 April 1970 – 24 September 1998), often shortened to Kongolo Mobutu and also known by his nickname 'Saddam Hussein,' was a son of Mobutu Sese Seko, the president of Zaire (now the Democratic Republic of the Congo), and an officer in the Special Presidential Division (DSP).

== Biography ==
=== Early life ===
Kongulu (also known as Kongolo) was one of the 21 children of President Mobutu Sese Seko. His mother was the President's first wife Marie-Antoinette Gbiatibwa Gogbe Yetene, who died in 1977. He was described as "a stocky, bearded man with a taste for fast cars, gambling and women."

=== Despotic activity ===
Kongulu Mobutu was a Captain in the DSP. When he left The School for Officers Training (EFO) in Kananga, he started his career as Second Lieutenant in The Military Service for Action and Intelligence (SARM). As Captain, he was Personal Secretary of General Bolozi in SARM. He was General Bolozi's protegee. Bolozi is married to Kongulu's aunt. Kongulu was a key enforcer in the final years of his father's regime.

In his childhood at Camp Tshatshi, Kongulu was nicknamed "Gang". Very tenacious at times, like his father, his straight character has earned him several nicknames, including that of "Vatican", as to say that he is a state within a state. His intimate friends also nicknamed him "Dubai" or "Tempelo". Out of all president Mobutu's sons, Kongulu was the most feared. His infamous nickname "Saddam Hussein" (Iraqi president dictator at the time) was not earned because of false allegations about brutal treatments against people in Zaire. He earned his nickname in the early 90s when he was a lieutenant, and with soldiers of his unit of the Division Spéciale Présidentielle under his command (DSP, Unité Dragons), came to save Zairean citizens who had an altercation with American G.Is in Kinshasa by circling them. He finally obtained the release of the Zairean citizens and was since nicknamed "Saddam" in reference to Iraqi dictator who was at the time defying the USA during the Gulf War 1 (Operation "Desert Storm"), to mark in the collective imagination that he defied the Americans.

=== Business activity ===
Kongulu Mobutu was in charge of various businesses in Zaire, including shipping and import firms, entertainment Yoshad Productions. He exercised a strong influence onto the popular musical band Wenge Musica BCBG of Werrason, Jb Mpiana, Didier Masela. He reconciled Koffi Olomide and Jossart Nyoka Nlongo after a feud. According to a former employee, quoted in a United Nations report, one of his companies, Hyochade, acted as a front for extortion, state propaganda and surveillance of political opponents. The German ZDF network's investigative program Kennzeichen D has claimed that Kongulu participated in the siphoning off of the national wealth by helping to organize the secret movement of gold to Gambia during the 1990s.

=== Flight from revolution ===
In April 1997, as forces led by Laurent-Désiré Kabila advanced towards Zaire's capital, Kinshasa, it is alleged that Kongulu Mobutu compiled a list of 500 of his father's opponents who were to be assassinated. When troops entered the city on May 17, Defense Minister, General Donatien Mahele Lieko Bokungu tried to negotiate and was shot dead. It has been claimed that Kongulu had a role in his killing at Camp Tshashi, but Kongulu would later be cleared of these accusations.

It is revealed that Kongulu was the one who came to cover General Mahele's body. He came after the action and senior Commanders of the DSP were present during assassination. Kongulu had no influence on DSP soldiers. He was the last most famous person of Mobutu's regime to leave Kinshasa on 17 May 1997, after he tried unsuccessfully to defend his father's rule (he commanded his father's bodyguards to the frontline). Kongulu fled across the border to Brazzaville later that day while rebels were almost 10 km away from the beach. His house was ransacked by soldiers and civilians.

== Family ==
Kongulu was married to Dany Kanyeba Nyembwe and had children together. They lived in Kinshasa.

== Death ==
Kongulu Mobutu died in exile in Monaco on 24 September 1998, aged 28 (a year after he attended his father's funeral at Rabat, Morocco). It is unclear if he died at the Princess Grace of Monaco Hospital or at his father’s villa del Mare of Roquebrune Cap Martin. His death remains mysterious, despite various testimonies saying he died of HIV causes, illness or wound infection. Former Reuters journalist Michela Wrong has written that he and his brother Nyiwa died of AIDS.
