= Nzanga Mobutu =

Congolese politician

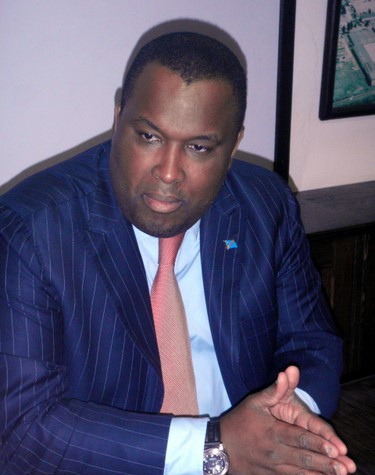
- Mobutu in 2010

Leader of the Union of Mobutist Democrats
- Incumbent
- Assumed office 8 January 2007

Deputy Prime Minister for Labor, Employment and Social Security
- In office 20 February 2010 – 10 March 2011
- President: Joseph Kabila
- Prime Minister: Adolphe Muzito

Deputy Prime Minister for Basic Social Needs
- In office 26 October 2008 – 20 February 2010
- President: Joseph Kabila
- Prime Minister: Adolphe Muzito

Minister of State for Agriculture
- In office 5 February 2007 – 10 October 2008
- President: Joseph Kabila
- Prime Minister: Antoine Gizenga

Spokesman to the President of the Republic
- In office 1 November 1996 – 16 May 1997
- President: Mobutu Sese Seko
- Prime Minister: Likulia Bolongo; Étienne Tshisekedi; Léon Kengo wa Dondo

Personal details
- Born: Mobutu Nzanga Ngbangawe; 24 March 1970 (age 56) Kinshasa, Democratic Republic of Congo
- Party: Union of Mobutist Democrats
- Spouse: Catherine Bemba Mobutu
- Children: 3
- Parent(s): Mobutu Sese Seko; Bobi Ladawa Mobutu
- Education: American University of Paris
- Occupation: Politician

Nzanga Mobutu (born 24 March 1970) is a Congolese politician and the son of the long-time President Mobutu Sese Seko. He served in the government of the Democratic Republic of the Congo from 2007 to 2011, initially as Minister of State for Agriculture and subsequently as Deputy Prime Minister for Basic Social Needs and Deputy Prime Minister for Labor, Employment and Social Security. He received the fourth-highest number of votes in the 2006 presidential election. In 2007, Nzanga founded the Union of Mobutist Democrats as the successor to his father's Popular Movement of the Revolution and has led the party since.

== Background ==
Nzanga Mobutu is the eldest son of Mobutu Sese Seko by his second wife, Bobi Ladawa. Nzanga grew up in Belgium and later studied communications and international relations in Canada and France before returning to Zaire in the mid-1990s. He then worked as spokesman/communications advisor to his father, and was also the chairman of the board for the Zairean bank, Soza Bank. In May 1997, he fled into exile in Morocco along with his father when rebel leader Laurent-Désiré Kabila captured Kinshasa.

He is married to Catherine Bemba, a daughter of businessman Jeannot Bemba Saolona, with whom he has three children: Nyiwa, Bobi, and Sese.

== Enterprises ==
In 1998, Nzanga alongside his mother, Bobi Ladawa, created the "Mobutu Foundation" in hopes of helping young men and women in Africa reach their full potential. In the following years, Nzanga founded Aries Communication, a communications firm in Morocco. He also served as director at Casa Agricola Solear, a Portuguese agriculture and livestock company, and became a member of the Renaissance think tank in Belgium.

== UDEMO in Équateur ==
In 2003 , Nzanga and his brother, Giala, founded the Union of Mobutist Democrats (UDEMO) as an NGO. On 12 December 2005, Nzanga announced his candidacy for the upcoming presidential election which was held in July 2006. Later in 2006, during the second round of the election, UDEMO became a political platform. On 8 January 2007, Nzanga officially launched a political career as leader of UDEMO, a political party advocating the restoration of peace, national unity and territorial integrity. He is most popular in the northwestern province of Équateur, specifically Gbadolite, whence his father hailed.

== 2006 presidential election ==
In the 2006 presidential election, he ran as a candidate and placed fourth, with about 4.8% of the vote. Following the first round of voting, Mobutu entered into a platform political coalition with the incumbent president Joseph Kabila to try to rally votes from the Equateur region. The coalition also involved the political party PALU of Antoine Gizenga.

His younger brother, Giala Mobutu, and eight other UDEMO candidates were elected to the National Assembly in the 2006 election.

== Government minister ==
Gizenga became Prime Minister in December 2006, and Mobutu was named Minister of State for Agriculture when Gizenga's government was announced on 5 February 2007, ranking second in the government after Gizenga. When Gizenga was succeeded by Adolphe Muzito, Mobutu was appointed as Deputy Prime Minister for Basic Social Needs in Muzito's government, which was named on 26 October 2008. On 20 February 2010, Mobutu was appointed Deputy Prime Minister for Labor, Employment and Social Security.

In March 2011, President Kabila dismissed Mobutu from the government for inactivity. Explaining the move, government spokesman Lambert Mende accused Mobutu of "abandonment of service" for staying in Europe since November 2010 "without any explanation." Mende stressed that the move was directed only against Mobutu and not his party. Apparently, Kabila had tried to foster a good relationship with Mobutu by appointing him consecutively as second in the government, but the latter seemed uninterested in it and focused solely on his work. Reportedly, Mobutu's reasoning for his prolonged stay in Europe was due to his disagreement with President Kabila's cultivation of a close relationship with Kagame's regime, which was believed to be responsible for the violence that occurred in the eastern region of the Democratic Republic of Congo. Following his dismissal, he again ran for office in the 2011 presidential elections against the incumbent president.

== Recent years ==
In subsequent years, he lived and engaged in business ventures between the United States and Morocco, with his brother Giala leading UDEMO. In the 2018 elections, Nzanga supported opposition candidate Martin Fayulu. On 10 January 2023, he returned to the DRC where he continues to lead his political party and supported incumbent President Felix Tshisekedi in the December 2023 elections.

== Election results ==
Year	Party	Votes	%	Position
2006	Union of Mobutist Democrats	808,397	5%	4th
2011	Union of Mobutist Democrats	285,273	2%	6th
