= N'dangi =

Village in DR Congo

N'dangi is a village in the Democratic Republic of the Congo. The village is located 12 km north of the city of Gbadolite at the Ubangi River at the border to the Central African Republic. N'dangi is known for the former military harbor, the only military harbor between Kinshasa and Kisangani. The harbor was built in the late 1970s and was connected by a secret tunnel to a nuclear bunker under the palace of the Mobutu. In the mid 1990s, with the downfall of Mobutu the harbor was destroyed and only a few ruins remain.
