= Marie-Antoinette Mobutu =

First wife of Zairian president Mobutu Sese Seko

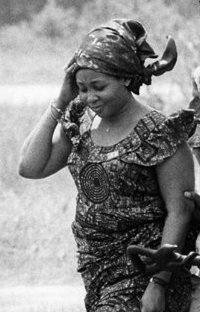
- Marie-Antoinette in Kinshasa, April 1977

First Lady of Zaire
- In office 24 November 1965 – 22 October 1977
- President: Mobutu Sese Seko
- Succeeded by: Bobi Ladawa Mobutu

Personal details
- Born: Marie-Antoinette Gbiatibwa Gogbe Yetene c. 1941 Banzyville, Équateur Province, Belgian Congo
- Died: 22 October 1977 (aged 35–36) Genolier, Canton of Vaud, Switzerland
- Spouse: Mobutu Sese Seko (m. 1955)
- Children: 9 (including Kongulu Mobutu)

Marie-Antoinette Mobutu (Marie-Antoinette Gbiatibwa Gogbe Yetene; c. 1941 in Banzyville – 22 October 1977 in Genolier, Canton of Vaud, Switzerland), also known as Mama Mobutu, was the first wife of Mobutu Sese Seko and First Lady of Zaire.

== Biography ==
Marie-Antoinette was an ethnic Ngbandi born in Banzyville (modern-day Mobayi-Mbongo) in the Équateur Province in c.1941, while the Congo was still under Belgian colonial rule. She met and married Joseph-Désiré Mobutu, another Ngbandi, who was later a non-commissioned officer in the Force Publique, during 1955 at the age of 14. That same year, she gave birth to their first son, Jean-Paul "Nyiwa". She attended Catholic mission schools and supported the Catholic Church despite her husband's later struggle with the Catholic clergy.

=== Children ===
Marie Antoinette bore the most out of all of Mobutu's wives, a total of nine children:

- Jean-Paul "Nyiwa";
- Ngombo;
- Manda;
- Konga;
- Ngawali;
- Yango;
- Yakpwa;
- Kongulu;
- and Ndagbia.

=== Death ===
Marie-Antoinette died of heart failure on 22 October 1977 in Genolier, Switzerland, at the age of 36. After she died, a vast mausoleum was raised in her honor. She is buried in Gbadolite, just outside the chapel in which she was originally buried by her husband. Her relatives relocated her remains from the chapel as it was destroyed a few years after Mobutu's burial.

== Awards ==
- Grand Cordon of the Order of Propitious Clouds (Taiwan, 1971)
