= Gbadolite Airport =

Gbadolite Airport Aéroport de Gbadolite
- Gbadolite airport reception hall
- IATA: BDT; ICAO: FZFD

Summary
- Airport type: Public
- Location: Gbadolite, DR Congo
- Elevation AMSL: 1,499 ft (457 m)
- Coordinates: 4°15′10″N 20°58′30″E

Map
- Location in the Democratic Republic of the Congo

Runways
Direction	Length		Surface
Direction	m	ft	Surface
07/25	3,200	10,499	Asphalt
- Source: WAD GCM Google Maps

Gbadolite Airport (French: Aéroport de Gbadolite) (IATA: BDT, ICAO: FZFD) is an airport serving Gbadolite, the capital of the Nord-Ubangi Province in the Democratic Republic of the Congo. The airport is at the village of Moanda, 6 kilometres (3.7 mi) southwest of Gbadolite.

The Gbadolite non-directional beacon (Ident: BLT) is located 5.2 nautical miles (9.6 km) east-northeast of the airport. The Gbadolite VOR/DME (Ident: BLT) is located on the field.

== History ==
Zairian President Mobutu had the airport built specifically so he could fly the Air France Concorde on chartered flights to Paris and elsewhere.

== See also ==
- Transport in Democratic Republic of the Congo
- List of airports in Democratic Republic of the Congo
