= Union of Mobutist Democrats =

Political party in the Democratic Republic of the Congo

Union of Mobutist Democrats Union des Démocrates Mobutistes
- Abbreviation: UDEMO
- Chairman: Nzanga Mobutu
- Founded: 8 January 2007
- Headquarters: 545 Kimbondo Avenue, Bandalungwa, Kinshasa
- Ideology: Congolese nationalism Liberal conservatism Christian democracy Mobutism
- Political position: Centre-right to right-wing
- Colours: Green and yellow
- Senate: 0 / 108
- National Assembly: 0 / 500

The Union of Mobutist Democrats (French: Union des Démocrates Mobutistes, UDEMO) is a political party in the Democratic Republic of the Congo. It is chaired by Nzanga Mobutu, the son of former Zairian president Mobutu Sese Seko.

== History ==
The party was founded by Nzanga Mobutu and his brother Giala Mobutu in 2004 as a non-governmental organization (NGO), with the aim of preserving the legacy of their father, former President Mobutu Sese Seko, and addressing social and political challenges in the country. From its inception, UDEMO emphasized an ideology centered on the restoration of peace, national unity, and territorial integrity, reflecting its commitment to rebuilding a cohesive and stable Democratic Republic of the Congo. These founding principles laid the groundwork for its evolution into a political party and its participation in the national political landscape.

On 12 December 2005, Nzanga Mobutu announced his candidacy for the upcoming presidential election, held in July 2006. Later in 2006, during the second round of the election, UDEMO transitioned into a political platform and joined the Alliance of the Presidential Majority (AMP), a coalition supporting President Joseph Kabila.

On 8 January 2007, Nzanga formally launched his political career as the leader of UDEMO, a political party advocating for the restoration of peace, national unity, and territorial integrity. The party maintains a strong base of support in the northwestern province of Équateur, particularly in Gbadolite. As part of the AMP coalition, Nzanga Mobutu served as Minister of State for Agriculture and later as Deputy Prime Minister for Basic Social Needs in Kabila's government.

Nzanga Mobutu ran as UDEMO’s presidential candidate in both the 2006 and 2011 elections, securing 4.8% and 1.6% of the votes, respectively. In the 2006 general elections, UDEMO won 9 out of 500 seats in the National Assembly. In the 2007 Senate elections, the party secured 1 out of 108 seats. In the 2011 general elections, the party won 2 seats in the National Assembly, followed by 1 seat in the 2018 elections. UDEMO also retained 1 seat in the Senate in both the 2019 and 2024 elections.

In 2023, UDEMO joined the Sacred Union of the Nation (USN), the presidential majority coalition under President Félix Tshisekedi.

== Electoral history ==
=== Presidential elections ===
Year	Candidate	Votes	%	Rank	Ref.
2006	Nzanga Mobutu	808,397	4.77%	4th	
2011	Nzanga Mobutu	285,273	1.57%	▼6th	

=== Senate elections ===
Year	Seats	+/−	Ref.
2007	1 / 108		
2019	1 / 109	Steady	
2024	0 / 108	Steady	

=== Parliamentary elections ===
Year	Seats	+/−	Ref.
2006	9 / 500		
2011	2 / 500	▼7	
2018	0 / 500	▼2	
2023	0 / 500	0	
