= Sango language =

Ngbandi-based creole of the Central African Republic

Sango
- Sangho, Sangoic
- yângâ tî sängö
- Pronunciation: [jáŋɡá tí sāŋɡō]
- Native to: Central African Republic; Chad; Democratic Republic of the Congo
- Region: Central Africa
- Native speakers: sag: 620,000 (2017) snj: 35,000 (1996)
- Language family: Creole: Ngbandi-based creole; Sango
- Writing system: Latin script

Official status
- Official language in: Central African Republic
- Recognised minority language in: Chad; Democratic Republic of the Congo

Language codes
- ISO 639-1: sg
- ISO 639-2: sag
- ISO 639-3: Either: sag – Sango snj – Riverain Sango
- Glottolog: sang1327
- Linguasphere: 93-ABB-aa
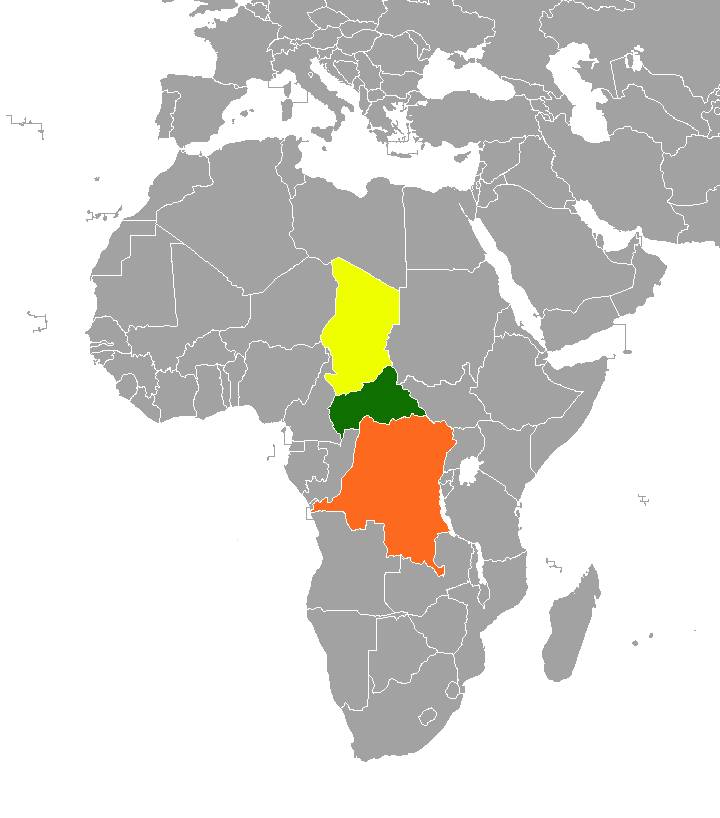
- Countries where Sango holds official status or recognized language: Central African Republic (official) Democratic Republic of the Congo (recognized) Chad (recognized)

Sango (also spelled Sangho) is a major language spoken in Central Africa, especially the Central African Republic, southern Chad and Democratic Republic of the Congo. The primary language of the Sango people (or Basango, Bosango, Sangho, Sangos), it is an official language in the Central African Republic, where it is used as a lingua franca across the country. Although there are no statistics to quantify people who speak it as a first versus second language, almost all 5,500,000 people in the Central African Republic speak it as of 2025.

Sango is a language with contested classification, with some linguists considering it a Ngbandi-based creole, while others argue that the changes in Sango structures can be explained without a creolization process. It has many French loanwords, but its structure remains wholly Ngbandi. Sango was used as a trade language along the Ubangi River before French colonisation in the late 1800s and has since expanded as an interethnic communication language. In colloquial speech, almost all of the language's vocabulary is Ngbandi-based, whereas in more technical speech French loanwords constitute the majority. Sango has three distinct sociolinguistic norms: an urban "radio" variety, a "pastor" variety, and a "functionary" variety spoken by learned people who make the highest use of French loanwords.

Sango is a tonal language with subject–verb–object word order, and its orthography was officially established in 1984. It has limited written material, mainly focused on religious literature. The main difficulties for English speakers are pronunciation and tone management.

== Classification ==
Some linguists, following William J. Samarin, classify it as a Ngbandi-based creole; however, others (like Marcel Diki-Kidiri, Charles H. Morrill) reject that classification and say that changes in Sango structures (both internally and externally) can be explained quite well without a creolization process.

According to the creolization hypothesis, Sango is exceptional in that it is an African- rather than European-based creole. Although French has contributed numerous loanwords, Sango's structure is wholly African.

== History ==
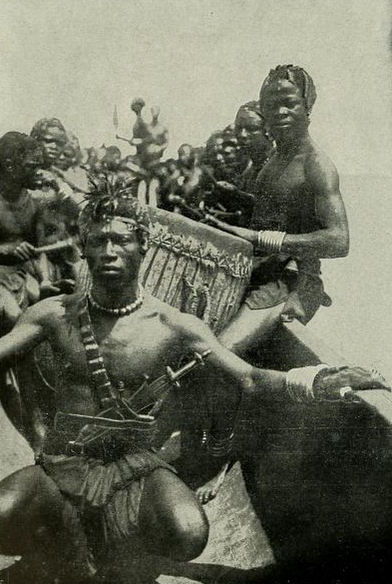
Sango tribe members, 1906

A variety of Sango was used as a lingua franca along the Ubangi River before French colonization, in the late 1800s. The French army recruited Central Africans, causing them to increasingly use Sango as a means of interethnic communication. Throughout the 20th century, missionaries promoted Sango because of its wide usage.

Originally used by river traders, Sango arose as a lingua franca based on the Northern Ngbandi dialect of the Sango tribe, part of the Ngbandi language cluster, with some French influence.

The rapid growth of the city of Bangui since the 1960s has had significant implications for the development of Sango, with the creation, for the first time, of a population of first-language speakers. Whereas rural immigrants to the city spoke many different languages and used Sango only as a lingua franca, their children use Sango as their main (and sometimes only) language. That has led to a rapid expansion of the lexicon, including both formal and slang terms. Also, its new position as the everyday language of the capital city has led to Sango gaining greater status and being used increasingly in fields for which it was previously the norm to use French.

== Geographic distribution ==
Sango is widespread in the Central African Republic, with a population in CAR of approximately 5,500,000 in 2025. It is also spoken as a lingua franca in southern Chad, where it is probably not spoken natively and its use is decreasing, and in the Democratic Republic of the Congo, where its use is increasing.

Today, Sango is both a national and official language of the Central African Republic, which makes the Central African Republic one of the few African countries to have an indigenous language as an official language.

== Registers ==
A study by Taber (1964) indicates that some 490 native Sango words account for about 90% of colloquial speech; however, while French loanwords are much more rarely used, they account for the majority of the vocabulary, particularly in the speech of learned people. The situation might be compared to English, in which most of the vocabulary, particularly "learned" words, is derived from Latin, Greek, or French while the basic vocabulary remains strongly Germanic. However, more recent studies suggest that the result is specific to a particular sociolect, the so-called "functionary" variety. Morrill's work, completed in 1997, revealed that there were three sociologically distinct norms emerging in the Sango language: an urban "radio" variety which is ranked by 80% of his interviewees and has very few French loan words; a so-called "pastor" variety, which is scored 60%; and a "functionary" variety, spoken by learned people, who make the highest use of French loanwords while speaking Sango, which scores 40%.

== Phonology ==
=== Vowels ===
Sango has seven oral and five nasal vowels. Vowel quality and number of nasalized vowels may be affected by the mother tongue of non-native speakers of Sango.

Sango vowels
	Oral vowels		Nasal vowels	
	Front	Back	Front	Back
Close	i	u	ĩ	ũ
Close-mid	e	o		
Open-mid	ɛ	ɔ	ɛ̃	ɔ̃
Open	a		ã	

=== Consonants ===
Sango consonants
		Labial	Dental	Alveolar	Palatal	Velar	Labial- velar	Glottal
Plosive	voiceless	p	t			k	k͡p	
Plosive	voiced	b (ɓ)	d			ɡ	ɡ͡b	
Plosive	prenasal	ᵐb	ⁿd			ᵑɡ	ᵑ͡ᵐɡ͡b	
Nasal		m	n					
Fricative	voiceless	f		s				h
Fricative	voiced	v		z				
Fricative	prenasal	(ᶬv)		ⁿz				
Rhotic				r				
Approximant	plain			l	j		w	
Approximant	prenasal				ⁿj			

Palatal affricates occur in loan words and certain dialects. Some dialects have alternations between [ᶬv] and [m], [ᵐb] and [ᵑ͡ᵐg͡b], [ᵐb] and [b], word-medial [l] and [r], and word-initial [h] and [ʔ]. [ᶬv] is quite rare.

=== Syllable structure ===
Syllable structure is generally CV. Consecutive vowels are rare but do occur. Consonants may be palatalized or labialized, orthographically C⟨i⟩ and C⟨u⟩, respectively.

Words are generally monosyllabic or bisyllabic but less commonly are trisyllabic. Four-syllable words are created via reduplication and compounding, and may also be written as two words (kêtêkêtê or kêtê kêtê 'tiny bit', walikundû or wa likundû 'sorcerer').

=== Tone ===
Sango is a tonal language. The language has three basic tones (high, mid, and low), with contour tones also occurring, generally in French loanwords. Tones have a low functional load, but minimal pairs exist: dü 'give birth' versus dû 'hole'.

Monosyllabic loan words from French usually have the tone pattern high-low falling (bâan 'bench' from French banc). In multisyllabic words all syllables carry low tone except the final syllable, which is lengthened and takes a descending tone. The final tone is generally mid-low falling for nouns (ananäa 'pineapple' from French ananas) and high-low falling for verbs (aretêe 'to stop' from French arrêter).

In isolation, tones have idiolectal variation, and they may also be affected by the mother languages of non-native speakers.

== Grammar ==
Sango is an isolating language with subject–verb–object word order, as in English. Noun phrases are of the form determiner-adjective-noun:

mbênï kêtê môlengê
INDEF small child
"a small child"

Plurals are marked with the proclitic â-, which precedes noun phrases:

â-mbênï kêtê môlengê
PL-INDEF small child
"some small children"

â- may be attached to multiple items in the noun phrase by some speakers, but this is less common:

â-kötä (â)zo
PL-big person
"important people/dignitaries"

The derivational suffix -ngö nominalizes verbs. It also changes all tones in the verb to mid:

kono	to grow, be big	kîri	to return, repeat
könöngö	size	kïrïngö	return

Genitives are normally formed with the preposition tî 'of':

dû tî ngû
hole of water
"water hole, well"

However, compounding is becoming increasingly common: dûngü 'well' (note the change in tone). Such compounds are sometimes written as two separate words.

The verbal prefix a- is used when the subject is a noun or noun phrase but not when the subject is either a pronoun or implicit (as in imperatives):

â-môlengê tî lo a-gä
PL-child of 3S SM-come
"his children came"

a-dü lo
SM-give.birth 3S
"he was born" (lit. 'someone bore him')

löndö mo gä
rise 2S come
"get up and come (here)"

The prefix is sometimes written as a separate word.

The pronouns are mbï "I", mo "you (singular)", lo "he, she, it", ë "we", ï "you (plural)", âla "you (plural)", âla "they". Verbs take a prefix a- if not preceded by a pronoun: mo yeke "you are" but Bêafrîka ayeke "Central Africa is". Particularly useful verbs include yeke "be", bara "greet" (bara o "hi!"), hînga "know". Possessives and appositives are formed with the word tî "of": ködörö tî mbï "my country", yângâ tî sängö "Sango language". Another common preposition is na, covering a variety of locative, dative, and instrumental functions.

== Orthography ==
Sango began being written by French missionaries, with Catholic and Protestant conventions differing slightly. The 1966 Bible and 1968 hymnal were highly influential and still used today.

In 1984, President André Kolingba signed "Décret No 84.025", establishing an official orthography for Sango. The official Sango alphabet consists of 22 letters:

Official 1984 orthography
22-Letter Sango Alphabet
A	B	D	E	F	G	H	I	K	L	M	N	O	P	R	S	T	U	V	W	Y	Z

Letters are pronounced as their IPA equivalent except for ⟨y⟩, pronounced as [j]. Also, the digraphs ⟨kp, gb, mb, mv, nd, ng, ngb, nz⟩ are pronounced [k͡p], [ɡ͡b], [ᵐb], [(ᶬv)], [ⁿd], [ᵑɡ], [ᵑ͡ᵐɡ͡b] and [ⁿz], respectively.

⟨’b⟩, ⟨ty⟩, and ⟨dy⟩ may be used in loan words not fully integrated into Sango's phonological system.

The official orthography contains the following consonants: ⟨p, b, t, d, k, g, kp, gb, mb, mv, nd, ng, ngb, nz, f, v, s, z, h, l, r, y, w⟩: some add ⟨’b⟩ for the implosive /ɓ/. Sango has seven oral vowels, /a e ɛ i o ɔ u/, of which five, /ĩ ã ɛ̃ ɔ̃ ũ/, occur nasalized. In the official orthography, ⟨e⟩ stands for both /e/ and /ɛ/, and ⟨o⟩ stands for both /o/ and /ɔ/; nasal vowels are written ⟨in, en, an, on, un⟩.

Sango has three tones: low, mid, and high. In standard orthography, low tone is unmarked, ⟨e⟩, mid tone is marked with diaeresis, ⟨ë⟩, and high tone with circumflex, ⟨ê⟩: do-re-mi would be written ⟨do-rë-mî⟩.

Sango has little written material apart from religious literature, but some basic literacy material has been developed.

== Learning ==
Sango is considered unusually easy to learn; according to Samarin, "with application a student ought to be able to speak the language in about three months." However, reaching true fluency takes much longer, as with any other language.

For English-speakers there are two main difficulties. One must remember not to split double consonants: Bambari, for example, must be pronounced ba-mba-ri, not bam-ba-ri. Also, as with any other tonal language, one must learn not to vary the tone according to the context. For example, if one pronounces a question with a rising tone as in English, one may inadvertently be saying an entirely different and inappropriate Sango word at the end of the sentence.

== Bibliography ==
- Bouquiaux, Luc (1978). Dictionnaire sango-français. Peeters Publishers. ISBN 2-85297-016-3.
- Diki-Kidiri, Marcel (1977). Le sango s'écrit aussi-- : esquisse linguistique du sango, langue nationale de l'Empire centrafricain. Paris: SELAF. ISBN 2-85297-057-0.
- Diki-Kidiri, Marcel (1978). Grammaire Sango: phonologie et syntaxe, langue nationale de l'Empire centrafricain (Thesis). Sorbonne Nouvelle University.
- Diki-Kidiri, Marcel. 1998. Dictionnaire orthographique du sängö
- Henry, Charles Morrill. 1997. Language, Culture and Sociology in the Central African Republic, The Emergence and Development of Sango
- Karan, Elke (2006). "Writing System Development and Reform: A Process" (PDF). Grand Forks, North Dakota: University of North Dakota. Archived from the original (PDF) on May 8, 2019.
- Khabirov, Valeri. 1984. The Main Features of the Grammatical System of Sango (PhD thesis, St. Petersburg University, in Russian)
- Khabirov, Valeri. 2010. Syntagmatic Morphology of Contact Sango. Ural State Pedagogical University. 310 p.
- Samarin, William J. (2008). "Convergence and the Retention of Marked Consonants in Sango: The Creation and Appropriation of a Pidgin" (PDF). Journal of Language Contact. 2. Dynamique du langage et contact des langues at the Institut Universitaire de France: 225–237. doi:10.1163/000000008792525354.
- Samarin, William. 1967. Lessons in Sango.
- Saulnier, Pierre. 1994. Lexique orthographique sango
- SIL (Centrafrique), 1995. Kêtê Bakarî tî Sängö: Farânzi, Anglëe na Yângâ tî Zâmani. Petit Dictionnaire Sango, Mini Sango Dictionary, Kleines Sango Wörterbuch
- Walker, James A.; Samarin, William J. (1997). "Sango Phonology". In Kaye, Alan S.; Daniels, Peter T. (eds.). Phonologies of Asia and Africa: (including the Caucasus). Eisenbrauns. pp. 861–882. ISBN 978-1-57506-018-7.
- Taber, Charles. 1964. French Loanwords in Sango: A Statistical Analysis. (MA thesis, Hartford Seminary Foundation.)
- Thornell, Christina. 1997. The Sango Language and Its Lexicon (Sêndâ-yângâ tî Sängö)
