= Civil Guard (Zaire) =

Military unit of Zaire

Zairian Civil Guard
- Garde civile zaïroise
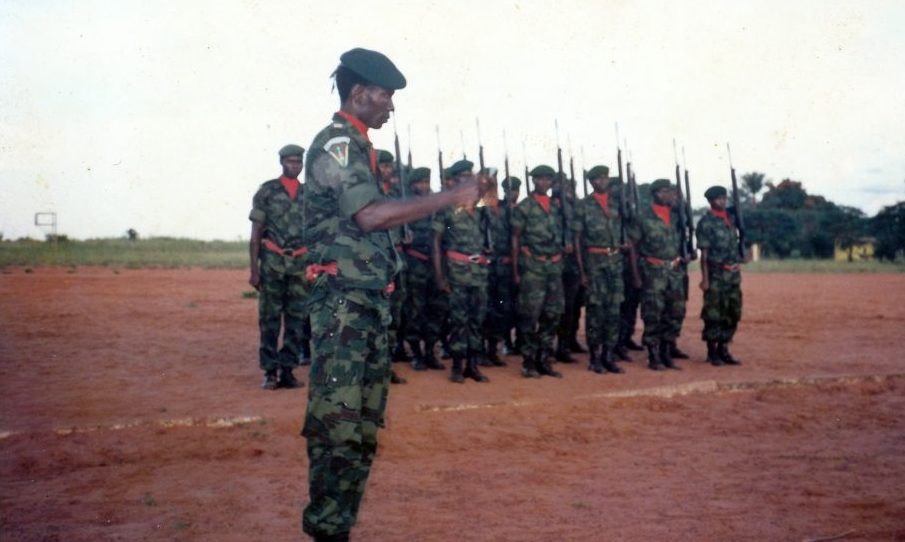
- The first promotion of the Civil Guard. Kotakoli Air Base, Équateur, in 1985.
- Active: 1984–1997
- Country: Zaire
- Size: 26,000 men in 1996
- Part of: Zairian Armed Forces (FAZ)
- Base: Kinshasa
- Engagements: First Congo War

Commanders
- Current commander: Gen. Kpama Baramoto Kata

The Zairian Civil Guard (French: Garde civile zaïroise) was a militarised police force in Zaire (now Democratic Republic of the Congo), created to support the regime of Mobutu Sese Seko.

== History ==
The unit was created in 1984, after fighting between Zairian and Zambian soldiers in the Shaba Province (now Katanga Province). Trained by instructors from West Germany and Egypt, it was responsible for border security, the fight against illegal traffic and terrorism, and the restoration of public order.

In 1987, the husband of a cousin of Mobutu's first wife, Kpama Baramoto Kata, then a section commander, was promoted to army general (général d'armée) and took charge of the Civil Guard.

In 1990–1995, the unit included a certain number of exiled Katangese Tigers who wished to return to the Katanga Province. In 1996, the Civil Guard, still commanded by Baramoto, officially consisted of 26,000 men, its budget being equivalent to four times of that of the regular Zairian Armed Forces (FAZ).

After having participated in the First Congo War, the unit was dissolved at the end of 1997.
