= Ngbandi language =

Ubangian dialect continuum of Central Africa

Ngbandi
- Ngbandi–Mongoba–Kazibati
- Native to: Democratic Republic of the Congo
- Region: Équateur Province
- Ethnicity: Ngbandi, Yakoma
- Native speakers: (Northern Ngbandi: 250,000 cited 2000); Southern Ngbandi: 110,000
- Language family: Niger–Congo?: Atlantic–Congo?; Savanna?; Ubangian; Ngbandi

Language codes
- ISO 639-3: Variously: ngb – Northern Ngbandi nbw – Southern Ngbandi yky – Yakoma deq – Dendi mgn – Mbangi gyg – Gbayi
- Glottolog: ngba1290
- ELP: Gbayi

The Ngbandi language is a dialect continuum of the Ubangian family spoken by a half-million or so people in the Democratic Republic of Congo (Ngbandi proper) and in the Central African Republic (Yakoma and others). It is primarily spoken by the Ngbandi people, which included the dictator of what was then known as Zaire, Mobutu Sese Seko.

== Varieties ==
Northern Ngbandi is the lexical source of the trade language Sango, which has as many native speakers as Ngbandi and which is used as a second language by millions more in the CAR.

A variety of Ngbandi may have been spoken further east, in the DRC villages of Kazibati and Mongoba near Uganda, until the late 20th century, but this is uncertain.

Yakoma, with a central position on the Ubangi River that divides the CAR from the DRC, has a high degree of intelligibility with all other varieties of Ngbandi, though as with any dialect continuum, it does not follow that more distant varieties are necessarily as intelligible with each other as they are with Yakoma.

Gbayi or Kpatiri is a divergent Ngbandic language. Gbayi had likely been adopted by people who had formerly spoken a Zande language. Nzakara, a Zande language, is spoken near Gbayi. Perhaps not coincidentally, Kpatili also happens to be the name of a spurious Zande language for which there is no linguistic data.

== Phonology ==
The phonology consists of the following:

=== Consonants ===
		Labial	Alveolar	Palatal	Velar	Labio- velar	Glottal
Nasal		m	n	ɲ			
Plosive	voiceless	p	t		k	k͡p	
Plosive	voiced	b	d		ɡ	ɡ͡b	
Plosive	prenasal	ᵐb	ⁿd		ᵑɡ	ᵑᵐɡ͡b	
Fricative	voiceless	f	s				h
Fricative	voiced	v	z				
Fricative	prenasal	ᶬv	ⁿz				
Rhotic			(r)				
Approximant			l	j		w	

- Sounds /l/ and /r/ alternate with each other.

=== Vowels ===
	Front	Central	Back
Close	i		u
Close-mid	e		o
Open-mid	ɛ		ɔ
Open		a	

== Writing system ==
Northern Ngbandi alphabet
a	b	d	e	ɛ	f	g	h	i	k	kp	l	m	n	ny	o	ɔ	p	s	t	u	v	w	y	z
