= Special Presidential Division =

- Active: 1985–1997
- Country: Zaire
- Allegiance: Mobutu Sese Seko
- Type: Praetorian Guard; Protective security unit Special operations force
- Role: Special operations Expeditionary warfare Special reconnaissance Direct action
- Size: 5–10,000 (5,200 estimated in 1988)
- Part of: Zairian Armed Forces (FAZ)
- Base: Kinshasa
- Equipment: AK-47; AKM; M16; FN FAL; Type 56; UZI and some artillery
- Engagements: Rwandan Civil War; First Congo War

Commanders
- Notable commanders: Nzimbi Ngbale

The Special Presidential Division (DSP; French Division Spéciale Présidentielle) was an elite praetorian guard unit created by Zairian President Mobutu Sese Seko in 1985 and charged with his personal security.

== History ==
It was initially called the Special Presidential Brigade (French: Brigade spéciale présidentielle) before being enlarged into a division in 1986, and was one of several competing forces directly linked to the president, along with the Civil Guard and Service for Action and Military Intelligence. Trained by Israeli advisors, the DSP was among the few units paid adequately and regularly.

It was commanded by Mobutu's cousin, General Etienne Nzimbi Ngbale Kongo wa Basa. The soldiers were recruited only from Mobutu's own tribe. The force was used to deal with internal opponents or suspected opponents. People were taken away, tortured, imprisoned without trial, exiled to another part of the country, or simply disappeared.

After the Rwandan Patriotic Front (RPF) invaded northern Rwanda which lead to the Rwandan Civil War, Mobutu sent several hundred DSP troops to assist the government of Juvénal Habyarimana. In 1993, the DSP was sent to quell unrest in Masisi, North Kivu but inflamed the situation after it sided with the Hutu residents against the indigenous Bahunde. It also shipped cobalt from Shaba Province to Zambia. (Reno 1997, 48) A 1996 United Nations report noted that Prime Minister Étienne Tshisekedi and his staff were subject to routine surveillance and harassment by DSP soldiers.
