= Ngbandi people =

Ethnic group in Central Africa

Ngbandi
Total population
- ~300,000

Regions with significant populations
- Democratic Republic of the Congo; Central African Republic

Languages
- Ngbandi (native), Sango, Lingala, French

Religion
- predominantly Christianity, minority Islam

The Ngbandi are an ethnic group from the region of the upper Ubangi River, located in the northern Democratic Republic of the Congo (DRC) and southern Central African Republic. They traditionally speak the Ngbandi language, which is part of the Ubangian language family.

== Culture ==
Historically the Ngbandi were subsistence farmers, and many still grow maize, manioc, and other food crops. Until recently, some of their subsistence depended on traditional hunting and gathering.

The Ngbandi were once known as warriors, and some of the most prized African knives and lances were made by their craftsmen. This culture and others of Sudan had close connections, as expressed by shared usage of a musical instrument, a kind of harp, whose form is distinctive to this area. Traditionally, they consider twins to be ayafo te angbo (lit. 'children of snakes').

== Population ==
The Ngbandi people have a population of around 300,000 people, mostly divided between speakers of the Northern Ngbandi and Southern Ngbandi languages. The Ngbandi language is a dialect continuum consisting of several varieties spoken in the upper region of the Ubangi River on the border between the Democratic Republic of the Congo and the Central African Republic.

== Notable people ==
- Mobutu Sese Seko – president and dictator of Zaire
