= Gbadolite =

- Provincial capital and city
- Ville de Gbadolite
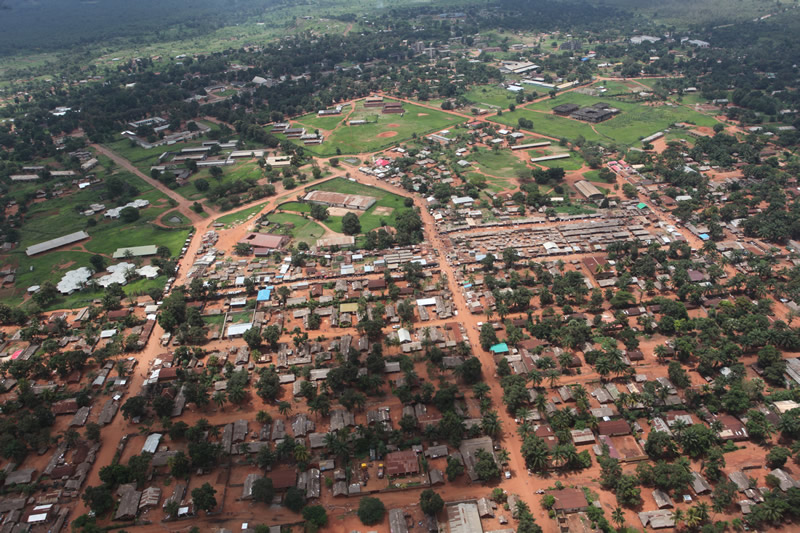
- Aerial view of the town

- Location within Democratic Republic of the Congo
- Coordinates: 4°17′N 21°01′E
- Country: DR Congo
- Province: Nord-Ubangi
- Zone (territoire) de Gbadolite: 8 December 1972
- Cité de Gbadolite: 25 March 1982
- Ville de Gbadolite: 10 January 1987

Government
  - Mayor: André-Teddy Kapalata

Area
  - Total: 278 km^{2} (107 sq mi)
- Elevation: 462 m (1,516 ft)

Population (2015 estimate)
  - Total: 198,839
  - Density: 715/km^{2} (1,850/sq mi)
- Time zone: UTC+1 (WAT)
- Climate: Am

Gbadolite or Gbado-Lite (Northern Ngbandi pronunciation: [ɡ͡badɔlite]) is the capital of Nord-Ubangi Province in the Democratic Republic of the Congo. The town is located 12 kilometres (7.5 mi) south of the Ubangi River at the border to the Central African Republic and 1,150 kilometres (710 mi) northeast of the national capital Kinshasa. Gbadolite was the ancestral home and residence of Joseph-Désiré Mobutu, later self-styled as Mobutu Sese Seko where airport, colleges, malls, supermarkets and libraries were built by the President in a program of modernization. Gbadolite is where Mobutu led the summit that would produce the Gbadolite Declaration, a short-lived ceasefire in the Angolan Civil War in 1989. By 1997, Mobutu fled to Rabat in Morocco as the rebels led by Laurent Kabila as the palaces of Gbadolite have been vandalized and looted which marked the end of Mobutu's dictatorship over 32 years of brutal dictatorship and the collapse of Zaire.

== History ==
Mobutu built Gbadolite into a luxurious town often nicknamed "Versailles of the Jungle". He built a hydroelectric dam on the nearby Ubangi River in Mobayi Mbongo, an international airport, Gbadolite Airport, which could accommodate a Concorde, and three large palaces. As a result, the people of the town had no trouble finding jobs. During Mobutu's regime, Gbadolite also had companies such as CDIA Zaire for farming productions, SOZAGEC for road construction, and SAFRICAS for house construction. The town had a general hospital with high tech facilities, supermarkets and malls, which were destroyed in 1997. Gbadolite had also College Presidentiel, a high school famous for its academic excellence and administered by Jesuit Fathers to whom Mobutu gave the school. This school had a chemistry lab, physics lab, computer lab, Olympic game facilities, and band instruments of all kinds. The town was also famous for its Chapelle Marie la Misericorde, a luxurious church in which Mobutu buried his first wife, Mama Mobutu.

Two palaces were built outside Gbadolite at Kawele. One was an elaborate complex of Chinese pagodas, while the other was a modern mansion. Both were used as residences for Mobutu and guests. The three-story palace in Gbadolite was used primarily for public functions.

Mobutu also built a nuclear bunker that could house more than 500 people. It was the only one in central Africa and the largest on the continent. The bunker was connected to the Ubangui River by a secret tunnel, giving access to the military harbour at the village of N'dangi.

When Laurent Kabila successfully led a rebellion and ousted Mobutu in 1997, Gbadolite was raided, and most of what was in the palaces was looted.

In 1998, the Ugandan backed MLC (Mouvement de Libération du Congo) rebel group, led by Jean-Pierre Bemba, captured Gbadolite from Kabila's government and it became the MLC's headquarters.

== Gallery ==
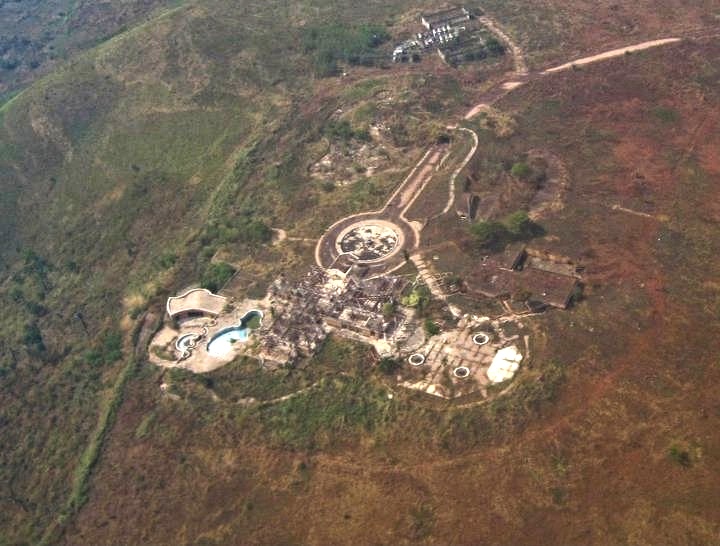
Site of the former Mobutu palace (ransacked)

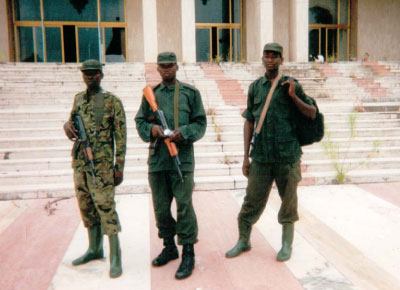
Soldiers belonging to opposition forces in Gbadolite

Gbadolite Airport

== See also ==
- Gbadolite Airport

== Bibliography ==
- Nagifi, Valentin (2003). Les derniers jours de Mobutu à Gbado-Lite (Congo-Zaïre) (in French) (Archive congolaise ed.). Paris: L'Harmattan. ISBN 2-7475-3623-8.
