= Mobutu Sese Seko =

President of DR Congo and Zaire from 1965 to 1997

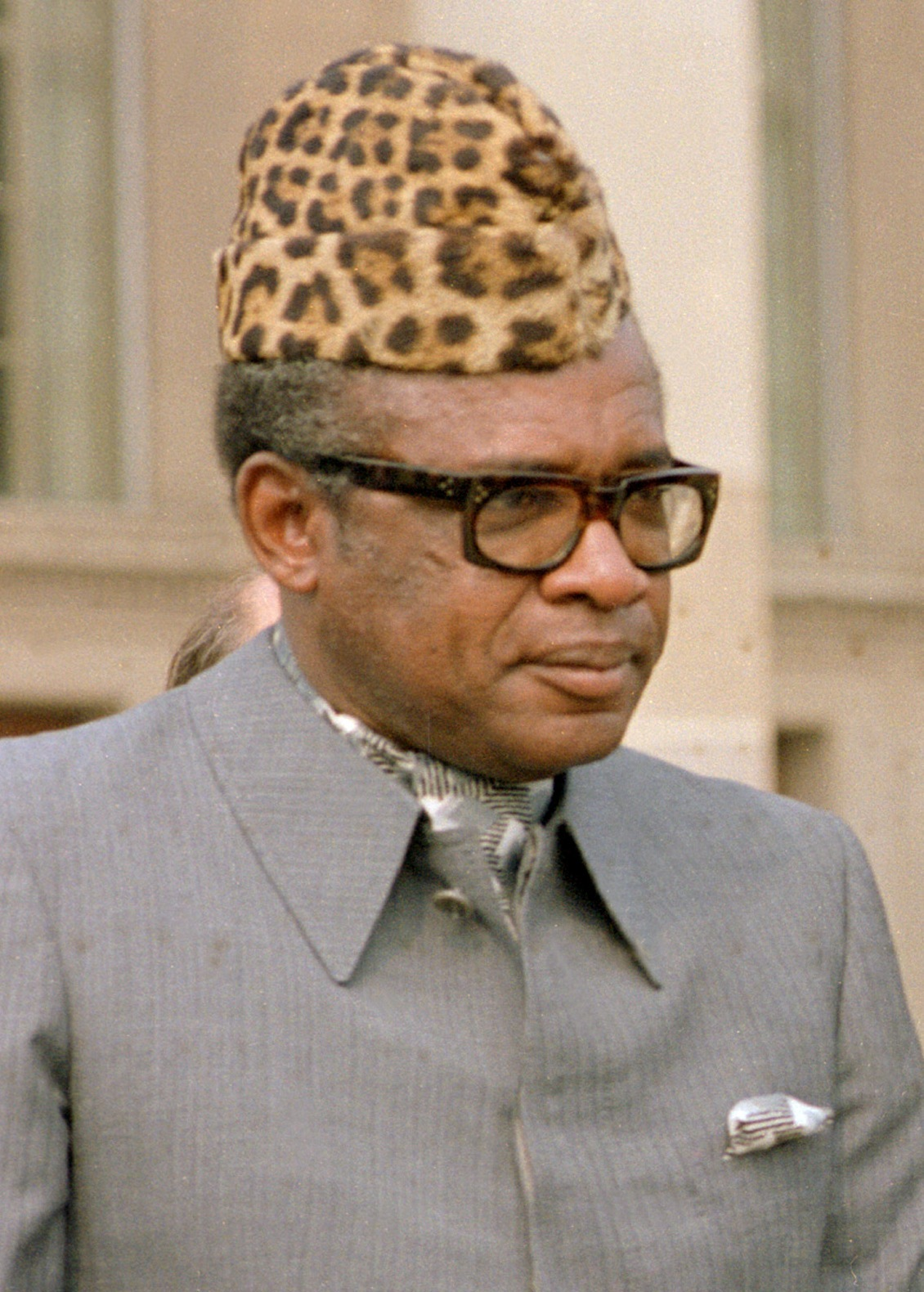
- Mobutu in 1983

President of Zaire
- In office 27 October 1971 – 16 May 1997
- Preceded by: Himself (as President of the DRC)
- Succeeded by: Laurent-Désiré Kabila (as President of the DRC)

2nd President of the Democratic Republic of the Congo
- In office 24 November 1965 – 27 October 1971
- Preceded by: Joseph Kasa-Vubu
- Succeeded by: Himself (as President of Zaire)

5th Chairperson of the Organisation of African Unity
- In office 11 September 1967 – 14 September 1968
- Preceded by: Haile Selassie
- Succeeded by: Houari Boumédiène

Personal details
- Born: Joseph-Désiré Mobutu; 14 October 1930 Lisala, Équateur, Belgian Congo
- Died: 7 September 1997 (aged 66) Rabat, Morocco
- Party: Popular Movement of the Revolution
- Spouses: Marie-Antoinette Gbiatibwa Gogbe Yetene (m. 1955; died 1977) Bobi Ladawa (m. 1980)
- Children: 16, including Kongulu and Nzanga

Military service
- Allegiance: Belgian Congo (1949–1960) (Democratic Republic of the Congo) Congo-Léopoldville (1960–1971); Zaire (1971–1997)
- Branch/service: (Belgian Congo) Force Publique; (Democratic Republic of the Congo) Congolese National Army; (Zaire) Zairian Armed Forces
- Years of service: 1949–1997
- Rank: Marshal (Army); Admiral (Navy); Commander in chief (Military)
- Battles/wars: Congo Crisis; Katanga insurgency; Shaba invasions; First Congo War

Mobutu Sese Seko Nkuku Ngbendu wa za Banga (Note: The name translates as "the warrior who goes from conquest to conquest, leaving fire in his path", "the warrior who leaves a trail of fire in his path", "the warrior who knows no defeat because of his endurance and inflexible will and is all powerful, leaving fire in his wake as he goes from conquest to conquest", or "the all-powerful warrior, who, because of his unyielding endurance and inflexible will to win, will go from conquest to conquest, leaving fire in his wake".) (/məˈbuːtuː ˈsɛseɪ ˈsɛkoʊ/ mə-BOO-too SESS-ay SEK-oh; born Joseph-Désiré Mobutu; 14 October 1930 – 7 September 1997), often shortened to Mobutu Sese Seko or Mobutu and also known by his initials MSS, was a Congolese politician and military officer who was the first and only president of Zaire from 1971 to 1997. Previously, Mobutu served as the second president of the Democratic Republic of the Congo, from 1965 to 1971.

Mobutu served as the fifth chairperson of the Organisation of African Unity from 1967 to 1968. During the Congo Crisis in 1960, Mobutu, then serving as Chief of Staff of the Congolese Army, deposed the nation's democratically elected government of Patrice Lumumba with the support of the U.S. and Belgium. Mobutu installed a government that arranged for Lumumba's execution in 1961, and continued to lead the country's armed forces until he took power directly in a second coup in 1965.

To consolidate his power, Mobutu established the Popular Movement of the Revolution as the sole legal political party in 1967, changed the Congo's name to Zaire in 1971, and his own name to Mobutu Sese Seko in 1972. Mobutu protected his rule through an intensely totalitarian regime and corrupt patronage network to regime supporters. He presided over widespread human rights violations. He attempted to purge the country of all colonial cultural influence through his program of "national authenticity". Mobutu was the object of a pervasive cult of personality.

Mobutu claimed that his political ideology was "neither left nor right, nor even centre", but was primarily recognized for his opposition to communism within the Françafrique region and received strong support (military, diplomatic and economic) from the United States, France, and Belgium as a result. He built close ties with the governments of apartheid South Africa and Israel. As a result of the Sino-Soviet split, Mobutu established close relations with China.

Mobutu was notorious for corruption and nepotism: estimates of his personal wealth range from $50 million to $5 billion, amassed through economic exploitation and corruption as president. His rule has been called a kleptocracy for allowing this personal fortune even as the economy of Zaire suffered from uncontrolled inflation, a large debt, and massive currency devaluations. Mobutu was further known for extravagances such as shopping trips to Paris via the supersonic Concorde aircraft.

By 1990, economic deterioration and unrest forced Mobutu Sese Seko into a coalition with political opponents and to allow a multiparty system. While he deployed troops to resist change, these efforts were short-lived. In May 1997, rebel forces led by Laurent-Désiré Kabila overran the country and forced him into exile. Already suffering from advanced prostate cancer, he died three months later in Morocco.

== Early life and education ==
Mobutu, a member of the Ngbandi ethnic group, was born in 1930 in Lisala, Belgian Congo. Mobutu's mother, Marie Madeleine Yemo, was a hotel maid who fled to Lisala to escape the harem of a local village chief. There she met and married Albéric Gbemani, a cook for a Belgian judge. Shortly afterward she gave birth to Mobutu. The name "Mobutu" was selected by an uncle.

Gbemani died when Mobutu was eight. Thereafter, he was raised by an uncle and a grandfather.

The Belgian judge's wife took a liking to Mobutu and taught him to speak, read, and write fluently in French, the official language of the colony. His widowed mother Yemo relied on the help of relatives to support her four children, and the family moved often. Mobutu's earliest education took place in the capital Léopoldville (now Kinshasa). His mother eventually sent him to an uncle in Coquilhatville (present-day Mbandaka), where he attended the Christian Brothers School, a Catholic-mission boarding school. He excelled in academic subjects and ran the class newspaper. He was known for his pranks and impish sense of humour. A voracious reader of history books, he read about and admired historical figures such as Napoleon and French president Charles de Gaulle. His favourite book was The Prince by Italian Renaissance philosopher Niccolò Machiavelli.

A classmate recalled that when the Belgian priests, whose first language was Dutch, made an error in French, Mobutu would leap to his feet in class and point out the mistake. In 1949 Mobutu stowed away aboard a boat, travelling downriver to Léopoldville, where he met a girl. The priests found him several weeks later. At the end of the school year, in lieu of being sent to prison, he was ordered to serve seven years in the colonial army, the Force Publique (FP). This was a usual punishment for rebellious students.

== Army service ==
Mobutu found discipline in army life, as well as a father figure in Sergeant Louis Bobozo. Mobutu kept up his studies by borrowing European newspapers from the Belgian officers and books from wherever he could find them, reading them on sentry duty and whenever he had a spare moment. His favourites were the writings of Charles de Gaulle, British prime minister Winston Churchill, and Niccolò Machiavelli. After passing a course in accounting, Mobutu began to dabble professionally in journalism. Still angry after his clashes with the school priests, he did not marry in a church. His contribution to the wedding festivities was a crate of beer, all his army salary could afford.

=== Early political involvement ===
As a soldier, Mobutu wrote under a pseudonym on contemporary politics for the magazine Actualités Africaines (African News). In 1956, he quit the army and became a full-time journalist, writing for the Léopoldville daily L'Avenir. Susan Williams states that during his time at L'Avenir, Mobutu had been recruited as an informer for the Belgian colonial government in Léopoldville.

Two years later, he went to Belgium to cover the 1958 World Exposition and stayed to receive training in journalism. By this time, Mobutu had met many of the young Congolese intellectuals who were challenging colonial rule. He became friendly with Patrice Lumumba and joined Lumumba's Congolese National Movement (MNC). Mobutu eventually became Lumumba's personal aide. Several contemporaries indicate that Belgian intelligence had recruited Mobutu to be an informer to the government. Further, Susan Williams explains that: "Mobutu caught the eye of an American working at the US embassy in Brussels: Lawrence Raymond Devlin (...). (...) But his position at the embassy was a cover, in fact he was working for the CIA. Devlin retained Mobutu's services as an informer. Mobutu was now working for both the Belgians and the Americans".

During the 1960 talks in Brussels on Congolese independence, the US embassy held a reception for the Congolese delegation. Embassy staff were each assigned a list of delegation members to meet, and discussed their impressions afterward. The ambassador noted, "One name kept coming up. But it wasn't on anyone's list because he wasn't an official delegation member, he was Lumumba's secretary. But everyone agreed that this was an extremely intelligent man, very young, perhaps immature, but a man with great potential."

Following the general election, Lumumba was tasked with creating a government. He gave Mobutu the office of Secretary of State to the Presidency. Mobutu held much influence in the final determination of the rest of the government. He lost private access to Lumumba following independence, as the new prime minister grew busy and surrounded by aides and colleagues, leading the two to drift apart.

=== Congo Crisis ===
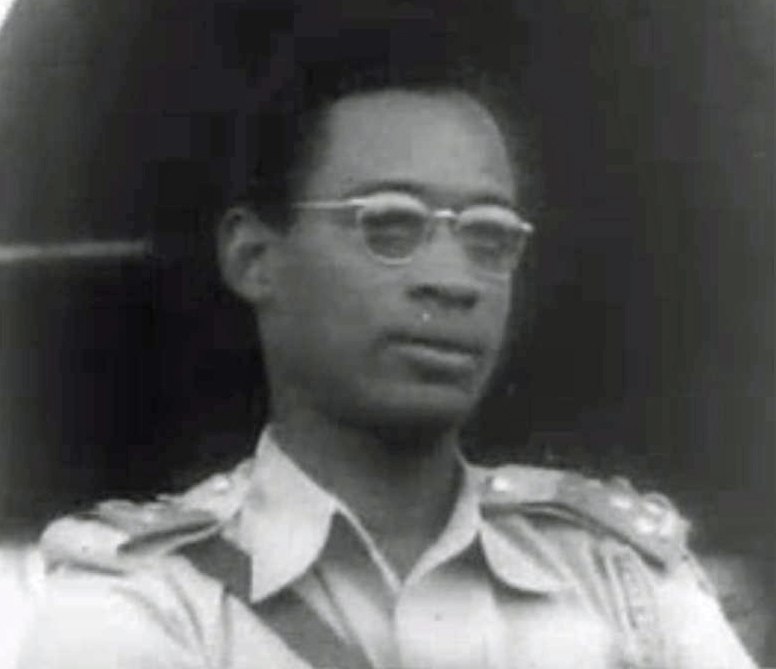
Mobutu in 1960

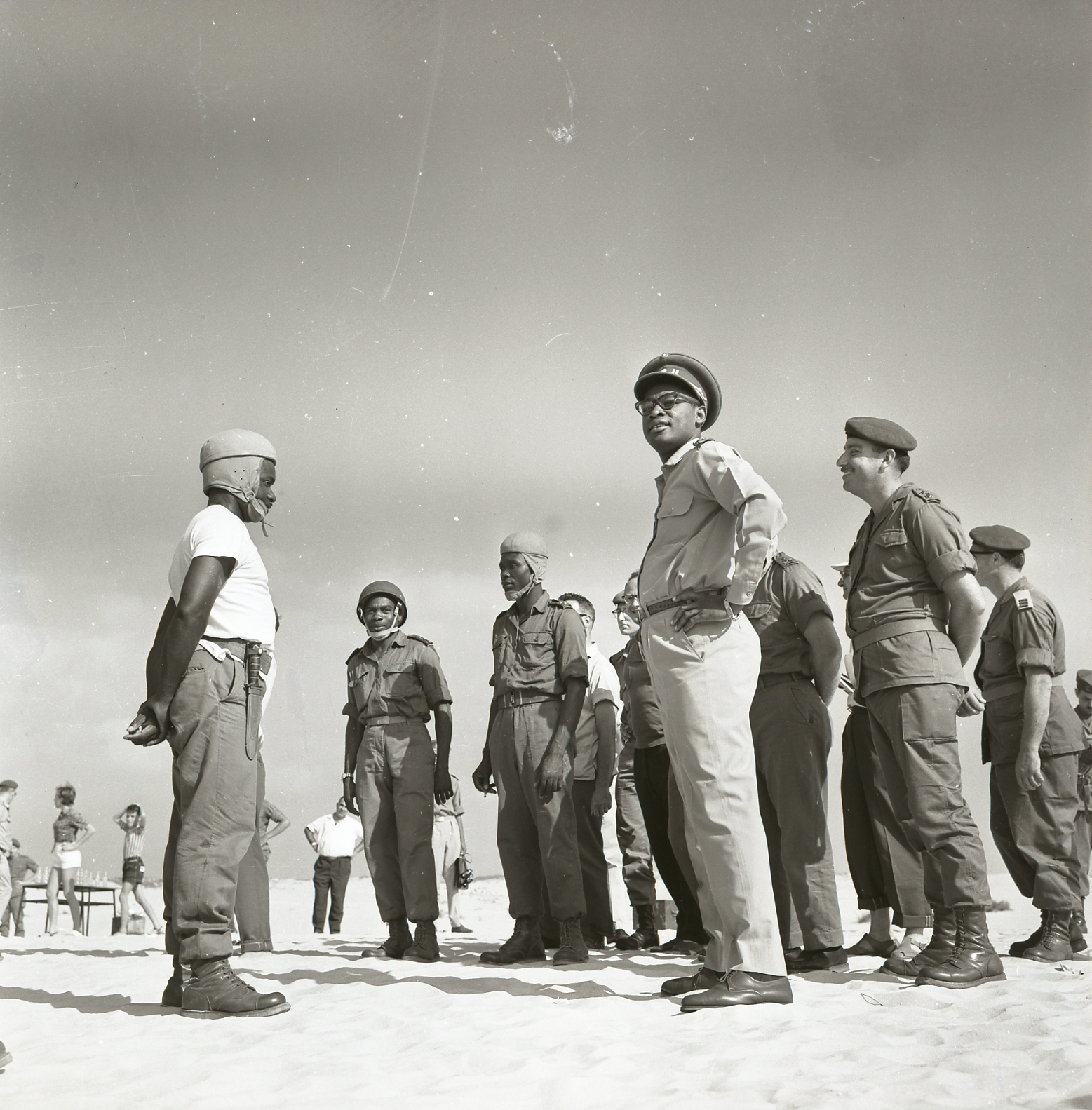
Mobutu during a 1963 visit to Israel, where he participated in a shortened IDF paratrooper course

On 5 July 1960, soldiers of the Force Publique stationed at Camp Léopold II in Léopoldville, dissatisfied with their all-white leadership and working conditions, mutinied. The revolt spread across the region in the following days. Mobutu assisted other officials in negotiating with the mutineers to secure the release of the officers and their families. On 8 July the full Council of Ministers convened in an extraordinary session under the chairmanship of President Joseph Kasa-Vubu at Camp Léopold II to address the task of Africanising the garrison.

The ministers debated over who would make a suitable army chief of staff. The two main candidates for the post were Minister of Youth and Sports Maurice Mpolo and Mobutu. The former had shown some influence over the mutinying troops, but Kasa-Vubu and the Bakongo ministers feared that he would enact a coup d'état if he were given power. The latter was perceived as calmer and more thoughtful. Lumumba saw Mpolo as courageous, but favoured Mobutu's prudence. As the discussions continued, the cabinet began to divide according to who they preferred to serve as chief of staff. Lumumba wanted to keep both men in his government and wished to avoid upsetting one of their camps of supporters. In the end Mobutu was given the role and awarded the rank of colonel. The following day government delegations left the capital to oversee the Africanisation of the army; Mobutu was sent to Équateur. While he was there Mpolo acted as ANC Chief of Staff. Mobutu was affronted by this development, and upon his return to the capital he confronted Lumumba in a cabinet meeting, saying, "Either I was unworthy, and you have to dismiss me, or I faithfully accomplished my mission and so I keep my rank and functions."

The British diplomat Brian Urquhart serving with the United Nations wrote: "When I first met Mobutu in July 1960, he was Prime Minister Patrice Lumumba's chief military assistant and had just promoted himself from sergeant to lieutenant-colonel. By comparison with his boss, Mobutu was a pillar of pragmatism and common sense. It was to him that we appealed when our people were arrested by Lumumba's hashish-stimulated guards. It was he who would bring up, in a disarmingly casual way, Lumumba's most outrageous requests – that the UN should, for example, meet the pay roll of the potentially mutinous Congolese army. In those early days, Mobutu seemed a comparatively sensible young man, one who might even, at least now and then, have the best interests of his newly independent country at heart."

Encouraged by a Belgian government intent on maintaining its access to rich Congolese mines, secessionist violence erupted in the south. Concerned that the United Nations force sent to help restore order was not helping to crush the secessionists, Lumumba turned to the Soviet Union for assistance. He received massive military aid and about a thousand Soviet technical advisers within six weeks. As this was during the Cold War, the US government feared that the Soviet activity was a maneuver to spread communist influence in Central Africa. Kasa-Vubu was encouraged by the US and Belgium to dismiss Lumumba, which he did on 5 September. An outraged Lumumba declared Kasa-Vubu deposed. Parliament refused to recognise the dismissals and urged reconciliation, but no agreement was reached.

Lumumba and Kasa-Vubu each ordered Mobutu to arrest the other. As Army Chief of Staff, Mobutu came under great pressure from multiple sources. The embassies of Western nations, which helped pay the soldiers' salaries, as well as Kasa-Vubu and Mobutu's subordinates, all favoured getting rid of the Soviet presence. On 14 September Mobutu launched a bloodless coup, declaring both Kasa-Vubu and Lumumba to be "neutralised" and establishing a new government of university graduates, the College of Commissioners-General. Lumumba rejected this action but was forced to retire to his residence, where UN peacekeepers prevented Mobutu's soldiers from arresting him. Urquhart recalled that on the day of the coup, Mobutu showed up unannounced at the UN headquarters in Léopoldville and refused to leave, until the radio announced the coup, leading Mobutu to say over and over again "C'est moi!" ("This is me!"). Recognizing that Mobutu had only gone to the UN headquarters in case the coup should fail, Urquhart ordered him out.

Losing confidence that the international community would support his reinstatement, Lumumba fled in late November to join his supporters in Stanleyville to establish a new government. He was captured by Mobutu's troops in early December, and incarcerated at his headquarters in Thysville. Mobutu still considered him a threat, and transferred him to the rebelling State of Katanga on 17 January 1961. Lumumba disappeared from public view. It was later discovered that he was executed the same day by the secessionist forces of Moise Tshombe, after Mobutu's government turned him over.

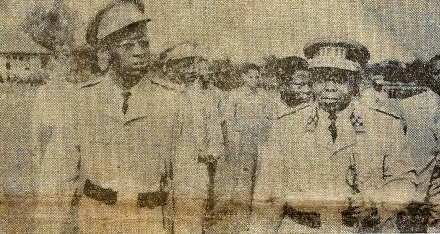
Mobutu (left) with President Kasa-Vubu, 1961

On 23 January 1961, Kasa-Vubu promoted Mobutu to major-general. Historian De Witte argues that this was a political action, "aimed to strengthen the army, the president's sole support, and Mobutu's position within the army". By then Mobutu had gathered a group of associates which became known as the "Binza group", a political faction which included several high-ranking government figures and began to influence state policy under Prime Minister Cyrille Adoula. The Binza group was supported and financed by the United States Central Intelligence Agency (CIA). Several other political factions were critical of the influence exerted by Mobutu and the wider Binza group.

In November 1963, Conseil National de Libération (CNL) militants targeted the Binza group as part of a coup d'état attempt. The CNL militants successfully kidnapped Mobutu and Victor Nendaka, but both managed to escape; the coup attempt was defeated. By mid-1964, the Kwilu and Simba rebellions had spread across much of the Congo, with the eastern regions being largely overrun by insurgents. In response, the Congolese army, led by Mobutu, reconquered the entire territory through 1965.

== Second coup and consolidation of power ==
Prime Minister Moise Tshombe's Congolese National Convention had won a large majority in the March 1965 elections, but Kasa-Vubu appointed an anti-Tshombe leader, Évariste Kimba, as prime minister-designate. Parliament twice refused to confirm him. With the government in near-paralysis, Mobutu seized power in a bloodless coup on 24 November. He had turned 35 a month earlier.

Under the auspices of a state of exception (régime d'exception), Mobutu assumed sweeping—almost absolute—powers for five years. In his first speech upon taking power, Mobutu told a large crowd at Léopoldville's main stadium that, since politicians had brought the Congo to ruin in five years, it would take him at least that long to set things right again, and therefore there would be no more political party activity for five years. On 30 November 1965 Parliament approved a measure which turned over most legislative powers to Mobutu and his cabinet, though it retained the right to review his decrees. In early March 1966 he opened a new session of Parliament by declaring that he was revoking their right of review, and two weeks later his government permanently suspended the body and assumed all of its remaining functions.

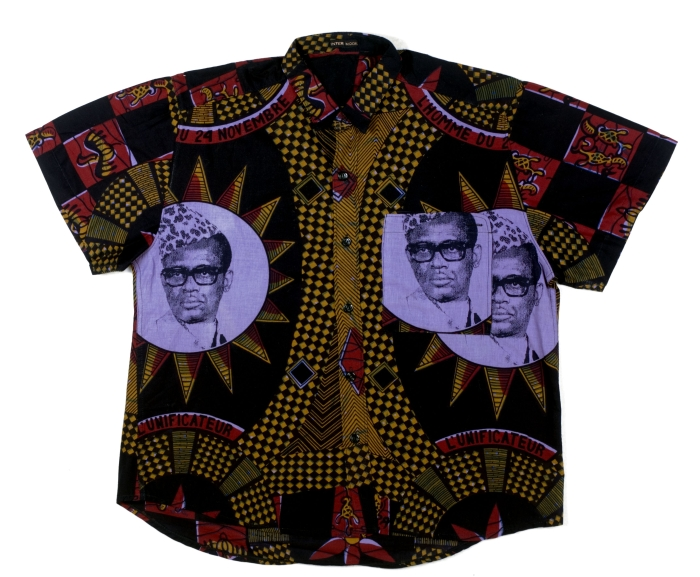
A Congolese cotton shirt embellished with a portrait of Mobutu from the collection of the Tropenmuseum in Amsterdam

Initially, Mobutu's government presented itself as apolitical or even anti-political. The word "politician" carried negative connotations, and became almost synonymous with someone who was wicked or corrupt. In 1966 the Corps of Volunteers of the Republic was established, a vanguard movement designed to mobilize popular support behind Mobutu, who was proclaimed the nation's "Second National Hero" after Lumumba. Despite the role he played in Lumumba's ousting, Mobutu worked to present himself as a successor to Lumumba's legacy.

1967 marked the debut of the Popular Movement of the Revolution (MPR), which until 1990 was the nation's only legal political party. Among the themes advanced by the MPR in its doctrine, the Manifesto of N'Sele, were nationalism, revolution, and "authenticity". Revolution was described as a "truly national revolution, essentially pragmatic", which called for "the repudiation of both capitalism and communism". One of the MPR's slogans was "Neither left nor right", to which would be added "nor even center" in later years.

That same year, all trade unions were consolidated into a single union, the National Union of Zairian Workers, and brought under government control. Mobutu intended for the union to serve as an instrument of support for government policy, rather than as an independent group. Independent trade unions were illegal until 1991.

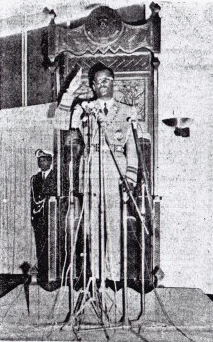
Mobutu sworn in as President of the Democratic Republic of the Congo following the 1970 election

Facing many challenges early in his rule, Mobutu converted much opposition into submission through patronage; those he could not co-opt, he dealt with forcefully. In 1966, four cabinet members were arrested on charges of complicity in an attempted coup, tried by a military tribunal, and publicly executed in an open-air spectacle witnessed by over 50,000 people. Uprisings by former Katangan gendarmeries were crushed, as were the Stanleyville mutinies of 1967 led by white mercenaries. By 1970, nearly all potential threats to his authority had been smashed, and for the most part, law and order was brought to nearly all parts of the country. That year marked the pinnacle of Mobutu's legitimacy and power.

In 1970 King Baudouin of Belgium made a highly successful state visit to Kinshasa. That same year presidential and legislative elections were held. Although the constitution allowed for the existence of two parties, the MPR was the only party allowed to nominate candidates. For the presidential election, Mobutu was the only candidate. Voting was not secret; voters chose a green paper if they supported Mobutu's candidacy, and a red paper if they opposed his candidacy. Casting a green ballot was deemed a vote for hope, while a red ballot was deemed a vote for chaos. Under the circumstances, the result was inevitable – according to official figures, Mobutu was confirmed in office with near-unanimous support, garnering 10,131,669 votes to only 157 "no" votes. It later emerged that almost 30,500 more votes were cast than the actual number of registered voters. The legislative elections were held in a similar fashion. Voters were presented with a single list from the MPR; according to official figures, an implausible 98.33% of voters voted in favour of the MPR list.

As he consolidated power, Mobutu set up several military forces whose sole purpose was to protect him. These included the Special Presidential Division, Civil Guard and Service for Action, and Military Intelligence (SNIP).

== Authenticity campaign ==
Flag of Zaire

Embarking on a campaign of pro-Africa cultural awareness, called authenticité, Mobutu began renaming cities that reflected the colonial past, starting on 1 June 1966: Léopoldville became Kinshasa, Stanleyville became Kisangani, and Elisabethville became Lubumbashi. In October 1971, he renamed the country as the Republic of Zaire. He ordered the people to change their European names to African ones, and priests were warned that they would face five years' imprisonment if they were caught baptizing a Zairian child with a European name. Western attire and ties were banned, and men were forced to wear a Mao-style tunic known as an abacost (shorthand for à bas le costume, or "down with the suit"). Christmas was moved from December to June because it was more of an "authentic" date.

In 1972, in accordance with his own decree of a year earlier, Mobutu renamed himself Mobutu Sese Seko Nkuku Ngbendu Wa Za Banga (meaning "The all-powerful warrior who, because of his endurance and inflexible will to win, goes from conquest to conquest, leaving fire in his wake."). Around this time, he eschewed his military uniform in favour of what would become his classic image – the tall, imposing man carrying a walking stick while wearing an abacost, thick-framed glasses, and a leopard-skin toque made in Paris.

In 1974, a new constitution consolidated Mobutu's grip on the country. It defined the MPR as the "single institution" in the country. It was officially defined as "the nation politically organized" – in essence, the state was a transmission belt for the party. All citizens automatically became members of the MPR from birth. The constitution stated that the MPR was embodied by the party's president, who was elected every seven years at its national convention. At the same time, the party president was automatically nominated as the sole candidate for a seven-year term as president of the republic; he was confirmed in office by a referendum. The document codified the emergency powers Mobutu had exercised since 1965; it vested Mobutu with "plenitude of power exercise", effectively concentrating all governing power in his hands. Mobutu was reelected three times under this system, each time by implausibly high margins of 98 percent or more. A single list of MPR candidates was returned to the legislature every five years with equally implausible margins; official figures gave the MPR list unanimous or near-unanimous support. At one of those elections, in 1975, formal voting was dispensed with altogether. Instead, the election took place by acclaim; candidates were presented at public locations around the country where they would be applauded into parliament.

== One-man rule ==
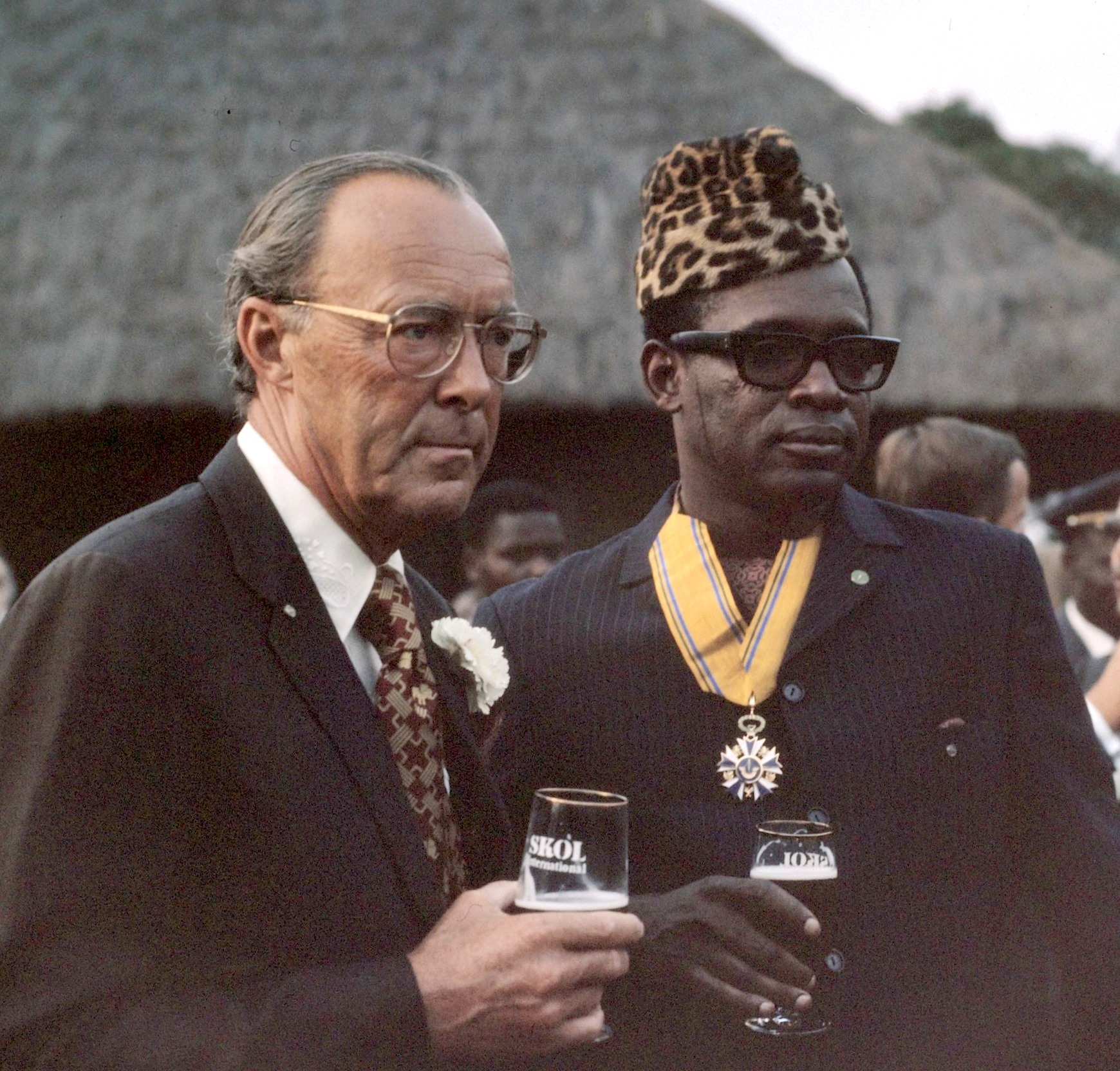
Mobutu Sese Seko with the Dutch Prince Bernhard in 1973

Early in his rule, Mobutu consolidated power by publicly executing political rivals, secessionists, coup plotters, and other threats to his rule. To set an example, many were hanged before large audiences. Such victims included former Prime Minister Évariste Kimba, who, with three cabinet members – Jérôme Anany (Defense Minister), Emmanuel Bamba (Finance Minister), and Alexandre Mahamba (Minister of Mines and Energy) – was tried in May 1966, and sent to the gallows on 30 May, before an audience of 50,000 spectators. The men were executed on charges of being in contact with Colonel Alphonse Bangala and Major Pierre Efomi, for the purpose of planning a coup. Mobutu explained the executions as follows: "One had to strike through a spectacular example, and create the conditions of regime discipline. When a chief takes a decision, he decides – period."

In 1968, Pierre Mulele, Lumumba's Minister of Education and a rebel leader during the 1964 Simba rebellion, was lured out of exile in Brazzaville on the belief that he would receive amnesty. Instead, he was tortured and killed by Mobutu's forces. While Mulele was still alive, his eyes were gouged out, his genitals were ripped off, and his limbs were amputated one by one.

Mobutu later switched to a new tactic, buying off political rivals. He used the slogan "Keep your friends close, but your enemies closer still" to describe his tactic of co-opting political opponents through bribery. A favourite Mobutu tactic was to play "musical chairs", rotating members of his government, switching the cabinet roster constantly to ensure that no one would pose a threat to his rule. Between November 1965 and April 1997, Mobutu reshuffled his cabinet 60 times. The frequent cabinet reshuffles as intended encouraged insecurity in his ministers, who knew that the mercurial Mobutu would reshuffle his cabinet with no regard for efficiency and competence on the part of his ministers. The frequency that men entered and left the cabinet encouraged gross corruption because ministers never knew how long they might be in office, thus encouraging them to steal as much as possible while they were in the cabinet. Another tactic was to arrest and sometimes torture dissident members of the government, only to later pardon them and reward them with high office. The Congolese historian Emizet F. Kisangani wrote: "Most public officials knew that regardless of their inefficiency and degree of corruption, they could reenter the government. To hold a government position required neither a sense of management nor a good conscience. On most occasions, effectiveness and a good conscience were major obstacles to political advancement. Mobutu demanded absolute personal allegiance in return for the opportunity to accumulate wealth." As early as 1970, it was estimated that Mobutu had stolen 60% of the national budget that year, marking him as one of the most corrupt leaders in Africa and the world. Kisangani wrote that Mobutu created a system of institutional corruption that greatly debased public morality by rewarding venality and greed. Mobutu maintained his control through an extensive patronage network.

In 1972, Mobutu tried unsuccessfully to have himself named president for life. In June 1983, he raised himself to the rank of Marshal; the order was signed by General Likulia Bolongo. Victor Nendaka Bika, in his capacity as Vice-President of the Bureau of the Central Committee, second authority in the land, addressed a speech filled with praise for President Mobutu.

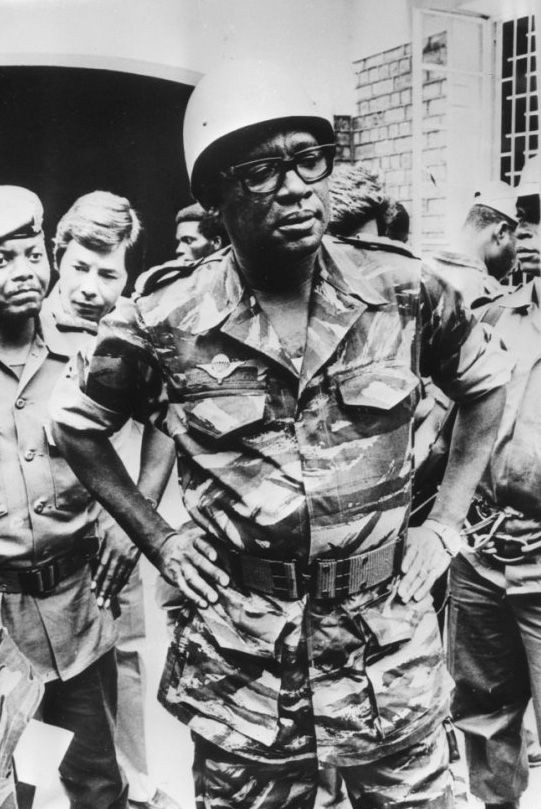
Mobutu Sese Seko in army fatigues, 1978

To gain the revenues of Congolese resources, Mobutu initially nationalized foreign-owned firms and forced European investors out of the country. But in many cases he handed the management of these firms to relatives and close associates, who quickly exercised their own corruption and stole the companies' assets. In 1973–1974, Mobutu launched his "Zairianization" campaign, nationalising foreign owned businesses that were handed over to Zairians. In October 1973, the Arab oil shock ended the "long summer" of prosperity in the West that had begun in 1945, and sent the world economy into its sharpest contraction since the Great Depression. One consequence of the oil shock and the resulting global recession was that the price of copper dropped by 50% over the course of 1974, which proved to be a disaster for Zaire as copper was its most important export. The American historian Thomas Odom wrote that because of the collapse in copper prices Zaire went from "prosperity to bankruptcy almost overnight" in 1974. The economic collapse forced Zaire to turn towards the International Monetary Fund (IMF) to help it manage its debts which could no longer be serviced. Seeking an alternative source of support as the auditors for the IMF discovered major corruption within the Zairian finances, Mobutu visited China in 1974 and returned wearing a Mao jacket and the new title of Citoyen Mobutu ("Citizen Mobutu"). Influenced by the Cultural Revolution, Mobutu shifted to the left and announced his intention to "radicalize the Zairian revolution". The businesses that Mobutu had just handed over to Zairians were in turn nationalized and placed under state control. At the same time, Mobutu imposed a 50% salary cut to state employees, which led a failed coup attempt against him in June 1975.

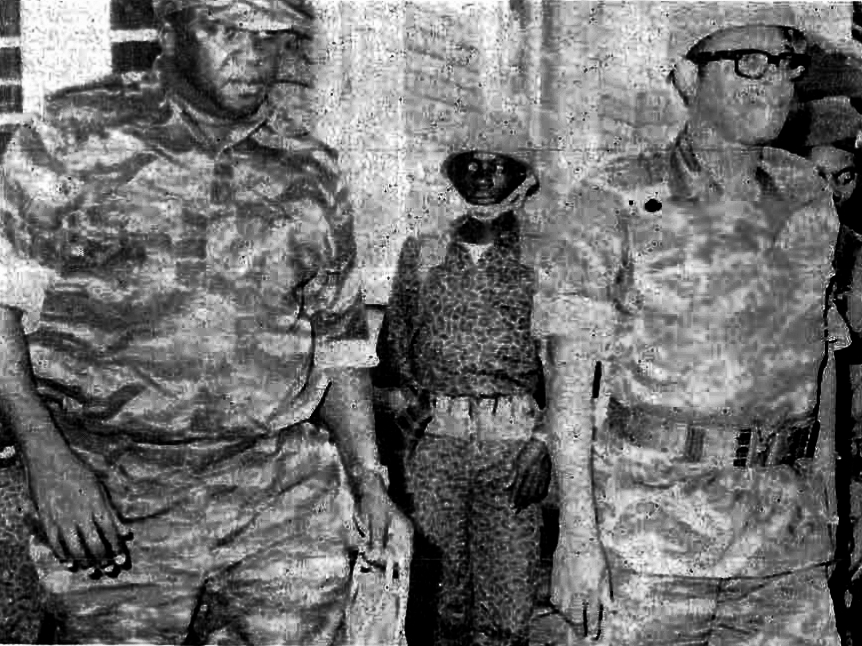
President of Uganda Idi Amin visits Zaire and meets Mobutu during the Shaba I conflict in 1977

By 1977, Mobutu's nationalizations had precipitated such an economic slump that Mobutu was forced to try to woo foreign investors back. Katangan rebels based in Angola invaded Zaire that year, in retaliation for Mobutu's support for anti-MPLA rebels. France airlifted 1,500 Moroccan paratroopers into the country and repulsed the rebels, ending Shaba I. The rebels attacked Zaire again, in greater numbers, in the Shaba II invasion of 1978. The governments of Belgium and France deployed troops with logistical support from the United States and defeated the rebels again. The poor performance of the Zairian Army during both Shaba invasions, which humiliated Mobutu by forcing him to ask for foreign troops, did not lead to military reforms. Mobutu reduced the size of the Army from 51,000 troops in 1978 down to 23,000 troops in 1980. By 1980, it was estimated that about 90% of the Zairian Army were Ngbandi as Mobutu did not trust the other peoples of Zaire to serve in the Army. The most loyal and best of Mobutu's units were his bodyguards, the Israeli-trained Special Presidential Division (Division Spéciale Présidentielle) that was made up exclusively of Ngbandi and was always commanded by one of Mobutu's relatives.

Mobutu was re-elected in single-candidate elections in 1977 and 1984. He spent most of his time increasing his personal fortune, which in 1988 was estimated to amount to no less than US$50 million. He held most of it out of the country in Swiss banks. A comparatively small $3.4 million was found in Swiss banks after he was ousted. This was almost equivalent to the amount of the country's foreign debt at the time. In a speech that he delivered on 20 May 1976 in a football stadium in Kinshasa that was filled with some 70,000 people, Mobutu openly accepted petty corruption, stating: "If you want to steal, steal a little in a nice way, but if you steal too much to become rich overnight, you will be caught". By 1989, the government was forced to default on international loans from Belgium.

Mobutu owned a fleet of Mercedes-Benz vehicles that he used to travel between his numerous palaces, while the nation's roads deteriorated and many of his people starved. The infrastructure virtually collapsed, and many public service workers went months without being paid. Most of the money was siphoned off to Mobutu, his family, and top political and military leaders. Only the Special Presidential Division – on whom his physical safety depended – was paid adequately or regularly. A popular saying that "the civil servants pretended to work while the state pretended to pay them" expressed this grim reality. The Forces Armées Zaïroises (FAZ) suffered from low morale made worse by irregular salaries, dismal living conditions, shortages of supplies and a venal officer corps. The soldiers of the FAZ behaved very much like a brutal occupying force who supported themselves by robbing the civilian population of Zaire. A recurring feature of Mobutu's rule were the seemingly endless number of roadblocks put by the FAZ who extorted money from the drivers of any passing automobile or lorries.

Another feature of Mobutu's economic mismanagement, directly linked to the way he and his friends siphoned off so much of the country's wealth, was rampant inflation. The rapid decline in the real value of salaries strongly encouraged a culture of corruption and dishonesty among public servants of all kinds.

Mobutu was known for his opulent lifestyle. He cruised on the Congo on his yacht Kamanyola. In Gbadolite, he erected a palace, the "Versailles of the jungle". For shopping trips to Paris, he would charter a Concorde from Air France; he had the Gbadolite Airport constructed with a runway long enough to accommodate the Concorde's extended take-off and landing requirements. In 1989, Mobutu chartered Concorde aircraft F-BTSD for a 26 June – 5 July trip to give a speech at the United Nations in New York City, then again on 16 July for French bicentennial celebrations in Paris (where he was a guest of President François Mitterrand), and on 19 September for a flight from Paris to Gbadolite, and another nonstop flight from Gbadolite to Marseille with the youth choir of Zaire. Mobutu owned a villa on the French Riviera, Villa del Mere.

Mobutu's rule earned a reputation as one of the world's foremost examples of kleptocracy and nepotism. Close relatives and fellow members of the Ngbandi tribe were awarded high positions in the military and government, and he groomed his eldest son, Nyiwa, to succeed him as president but Nyiwa died from AIDS in 1994.

Mobutu led one of the most enduring autocracies in Africa and amassed a personal fortune estimated to be over US$50 million by selling his nation's rich natural resources while the people lived in poverty. While in office, he formed a totalitarian regime responsible for numerous human rights violations, attempted to purge the country of all Belgian cultural influences, and maintained an anti-communist stance to gain positive international support.

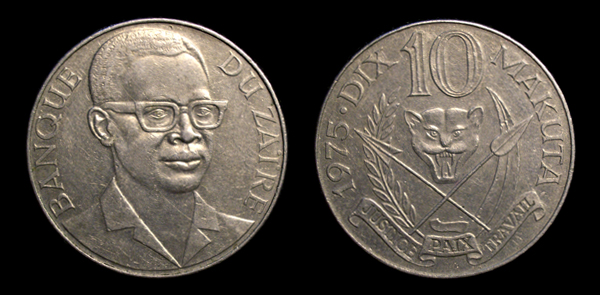
10 Makuta coin depicting Mobutu Sese Seko

Mobutu was the subject of one of the most pervasive personality cults of the twentieth century. The evening newscast opened with an image of him descending through clouds like a god. His portraits were hung in many public places, and government officials wore lapel pins bearing his portrait. He held such titles as "Father of the Nation", "Messiah", "Guide of the Revolution", "Helmsman", "Founder", "Savior of the People", and "Supreme Combatant". In the 1996 documentary of the 1974 Foreman–Ali fight in Zaire, dancers receiving the fighters can be heard chanting "Sese Seko, Sese Seko". At one point, in early 1975, the media were forbidden to refer to anyone other than Mobutu by name; others were referred to only by the positions they held.

Mobutu successfully capitalized on Cold War tensions among European nations and the United States. He gained significant support from the West and its international organizations such as the International Monetary Fund.

=== Patronage of German private aeronautics in Zaire ===
In the late 1970s, the West Germany company OTRAG was developing a program to send peaceful satellites into space at lower costs, but a 1954 amendment to the Treaty of Brussels prevented them from developing and launching missiles in Germany. As a result, they paid Mobutu $130 million to develop their program in Zaire. In a 1978 agreement with OTRAG, Mobutu gave the company a 25-year rented plot of land in Zaire. The first rocket, OTRAG-1, was launched on 18 May 1977, while Mobutu watched from a distance. The rocket took off successfully, but shortly afterwards fell and crashed back down to the ground.

By 6 June 1978, two more rockets had been launched and crashed in Zaire. Nevertheless, Mobutu continued to promote the program, stating that 200 Zairians were employed by the project and the country would receive royalties from future rocket sales. Two years after the launch of the first rocket, the Soviet Union alleged that former Nazi scientists were involved with OTRAG, and became convinced that the company was secretly gathering military intelligence. Mobutu succumbed to Soviet pressure, ended the program, and cut ties with OTRAG.

=== Foreign policy ===
==== Relations with Belgium ====
Relations between Zaire and Belgium wavered between close ties and open hostility during the Mobutu years. More often than not, Belgian decision-makers responded indifferently when Mobutu acted against the interests of Belgium, partly explained by the highly divided Belgian political class. Relations soured early in Mobutu's rule over disputes involving the substantial Belgian commercial and industrial holdings in the country, but they warmed soon afterwards. Mobutu and his family were received as personal guests of the Belgian monarch in 1968, and a convention for scientific and technical cooperation was signed that same year. During King Baudouin's highly successful visit to Kinshasa in 1970, a treaty of friendship and cooperation between the two countries was signed. Mobutu tore up the treaty in 1974 in protest at Belgium's refusal to ban an anti-Mobutu book written by left-wing lawyer Jules Chomé. Mobutu's "Zairianisation" policy, which expropriated foreign-held businesses and transferred their ownership to Zairians, added to the strain. Mobutu maintained several personal contacts with prominent Belgians. Edmond Leburton, Belgian prime minister between 1973 and 1974, was someone greatly admired by the President. Alfred Cahen, career diplomat and chef de cabinet of minister Henri Simonet, became a personal friend of Mobutu when he was a student at the Université Libre de Bruxelles. Relations with King Baudouin were mostly cordial, until Mobutu released a bold statement about the Belgian royal family. Prime Minister Wilfried Martens recalled in his memoirs that the palace gates closed completely after Mobutu published a handwritten letter of the King. Because of that, Mobutu was one of only two heads of state who did not receive an invitation to the funeral of Baudouin, the other being Saddam Hussein of Iraq. Next to friendly ties with Belgians residing in Belgium, Mobutu had a number of Belgian advisors at his disposal. Some of them, such as Hugues Leclercq and Colonel Willy Mallants, were interviewed in Thierry Michel's documentary Mobutu, King of Zaire.

==== Relations with France ====
As then the second most populous French-speaking country in the world (it has subsequently come to have a larger population than France) and the most populous one in sub-Saharan Africa, Zaire was of great strategic interest to France. During the First Republic era, France tended to side with the conservative and federalist forces, as opposed to unitarists such as Lumumba. Shortly after the Katangan secession was successfully crushed, Zaire (then called the Republic of the Congo) signed a treaty of technical and cultural cooperation with France. During the presidency of Charles de Gaulle, diplomatic relations between the two countries gradually grew stronger and closer due to their many shared geopolitical interests. In 1971, Finance Minister Valéry Giscard d'Estaing paid a visit to Zaire; later, after becoming France's president, he would develop a close personal relationship with President Mobutu, and under his leadership, France became one of the Mobutu regime's closest and most important foreign allies. During the Shaba invasions, France sided firmly with Mobutu: during the first Shaba invasion, France airlifted 1,500 Moroccan troops to Zaire, and the rebels were repulsed; a year later, during the second Shaba invasion, France itself (along with Belgium) would send French Foreign Legion paratroopers (2nd Foreign Parachute Regiment) to aid Mobutu.

==== Relations with the People's Republic of China ====
Initially, Zaire's relationship with the People's Republic of China was no better than its relationship with the Soviet Union. Memories of Chinese aid to Mulele and other Maoist rebels in Kwilu province during the ill-fated Simba Rebellion remained fresh on Mobutu's mind. He opposed seating the PRC at the United Nations. By 1972, he began to see the Chinese in a different light, as a counterbalance to both the Soviet Union as well as his intimate ties with the United States, Israel, and South Africa. In November 1972, Mobutu extended diplomatic recognition to the Chinese (as well as East Germany and North Korea). The following year, Mobutu paid a visit to Beijing, where he met with chairman Mao Zedong and received promises of $100 million in technical aid. In 1983, then Chinese Premier Zhao Ziyang announced on a trip to Zaire that the money would not have to be repaid.

In 1974, Mobutu made a surprise visit to both China and North Korea, during the time he was originally scheduled to visit the Soviet Union. Upon returning home, both his politics and rhetoric became markedly more radical; it was around this time that Mobutu began criticizing Belgium and the United States (the latter for not doing enough, in Mobutu's opinion, to combat white minority rule in South Africa and Rhodesia), introduced the obligatory civic work program called salongo, and initiated "radicalization" (an extension of 1973's "Zairianization" policy). Mobutu even borrowed a title – the Helmsman – from Mao. Incidentally, late 1974 to early 1975 was when his personality cult reached its peak.

China and Zaire shared a common goal in central Africa, namely doing everything in their power to halt Soviet gains in the area. Accordingly, both Zaire and China covertly funnelled aid to the National Liberation Front of Angola (and later, the National Union for the Total Independence of Angola) in order to prevent their former allies, the People's Movement for the Liberation of Angola, who were supported and augmented by Cuban forces, from coming to power. The Cubans, who exercised considerable influence in Africa in support of leftist and anti-imperialist forces, were heavily sponsored by the Soviet Union during the period. In addition to inviting Holden Roberto, the leader of the National Liberation Front of Angola, and his guerrillas to Beijing for training, China provided weapons and money to the rebels. Zaire itself launched an ill-fated, pre-emptive invasion of Angola in a bid to install a pro-Kinshasa government, but was repulsed by Cuban troops. The expedition was a fiasco with far-reaching repercussions, most notably the Shaba I and Shaba II invasions, both of which China opposed. China sent military aid to Zaire during both invasions, and accused the Soviet Union and Cuba (who were alleged to have supported the Shaban rebels, although this was and remains speculation) of working to de-stabilize central Africa.

==== Relations with the Soviet Union ====
Mobutu's relationship with the Soviet Union was frosty and tense. A staunch anti-communist, he was not anxious to recognize the Soviets; the USSR had supported – though mostly in words – both Patrice Lumumba, Mobutu's democratically elected predecessor, and the Simba rebellion. However, to project a non-aligned image, he did renew ties in 1967; the first Soviet ambassador arrived and presented his credentials in 1968. Mobutu joined the United States in condemning the Soviet invasion of Czechoslovakia that year. Mobutu viewed the Soviet presence as advantageous for two reasons: it allowed him to maintain an image of non-alignment, and it provided a convenient scapegoat for problems at home. For example, in 1970, he expelled four Soviet diplomats for carrying out "subversive activities", and in 1971, twenty Soviet officials were declared persona non grata for allegedly instigating student demonstrations at Lovanium University.

Moscow was the only major world capital Mobutu never visited, although he did accept an invitation to do so in 1974. For reasons unknown, he cancelled the visit at the last minute, and toured the People's Republic of China and North Korea instead.

Relations cooled further in 1975, when the two countries found themselves on opposing sides in the Angolan Civil War. This had a dramatic effect on Zairian foreign policy for the next decade; bereft of his claim to African leadership (Mobutu was one of the few leaders who refused to recognize the Marxist government of Angola), Mobutu turned increasingly to the US and its allies, adopting pro-American stances on such issues as the Soviet invasion of Afghanistan, and Israel's position in international organizations.

==== Relations with the United States ====
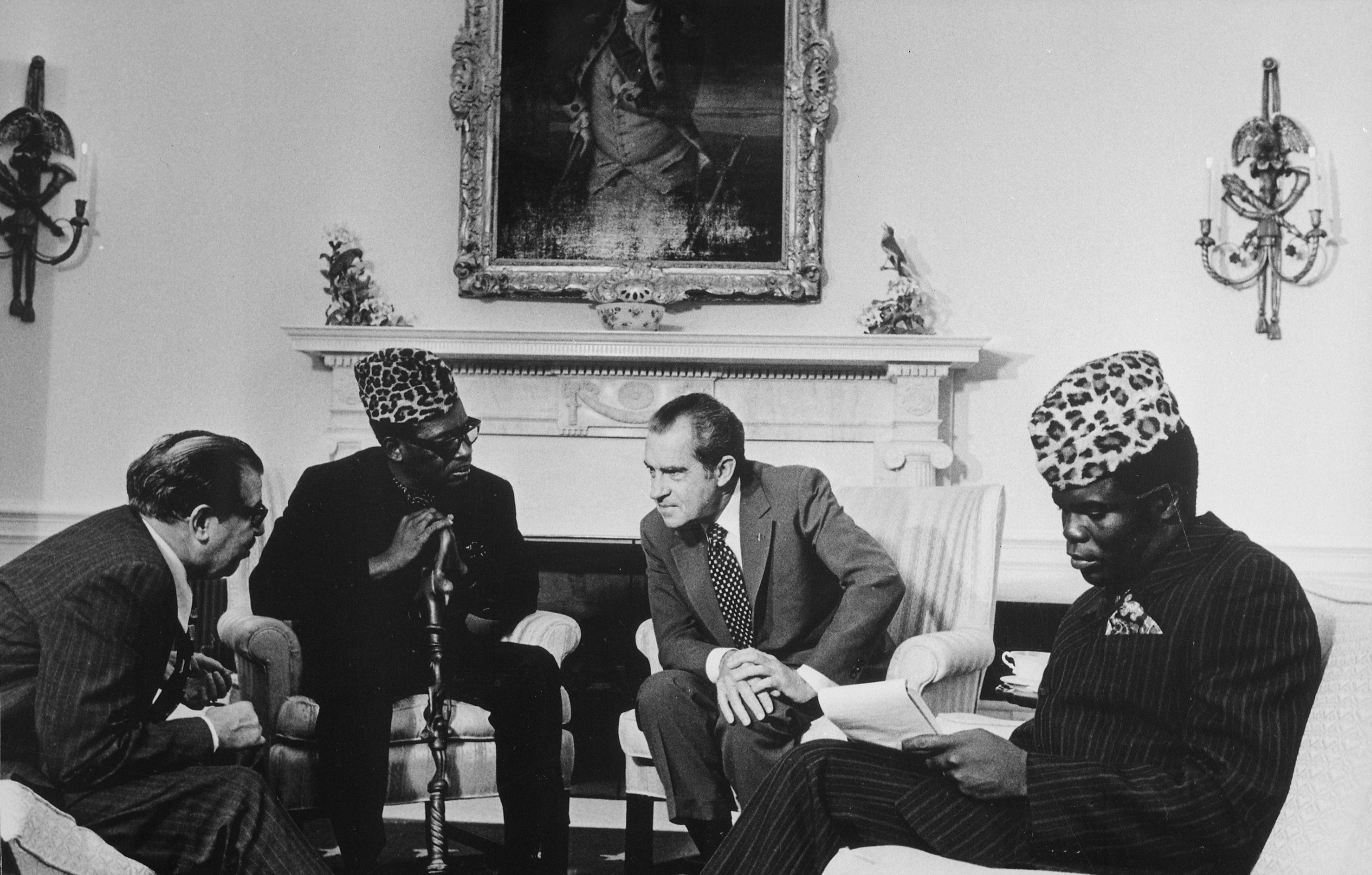
Mobutu Sese Seko and Richard Nixon in Washington, D.C., October 1973

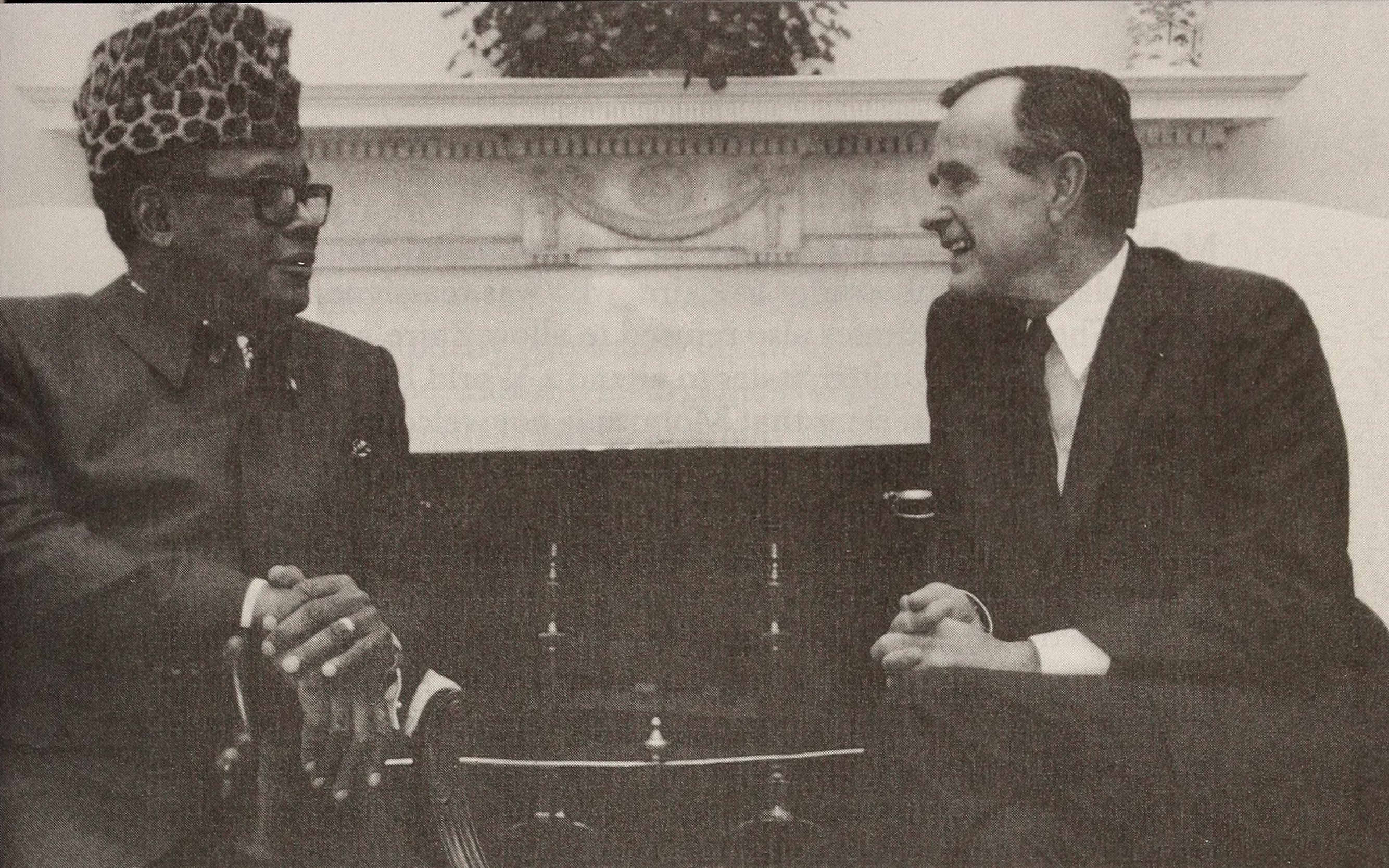
Mobutu Sese Seko and U.S. President George H. W. Bush in Washington, D.C., 1989.

For the most part, Zaire enjoyed warm relations with the United States. The United States was the third largest donor of aid to Zaire (after Belgium and France), and Mobutu befriended several US presidents, including Richard Nixon, Ronald Reagan, and George H. W. Bush. Relations did cool significantly in 1974–1975 over Mobutu's increasingly radical rhetoric (which included his scathing denunciations of American foreign policy), and plummeted to an all-time low in the summer of 1975, when Mobutu accused the CIA of plotting his overthrow and arrested eleven senior Zairian generals and several civilians, and condemned (in absentia) a former head of the Central Bank (Albert Ndele). Many viewed these charges with scepticism, with one of Mobutu's staunchest critics, Nzongola-Ntalaja, speculating that Mobutu invented the plot as an excuse to purge the military of talented officers who might otherwise pose a threat to his rule. In spite of these hindrances, the chilly relationship quickly thawed when both countries found each other supporting the same side during the Angolan Civil War.

Because of Mobutu's poor human rights record, the Carter Administration put some distance between itself and the Kinshasa government; even so, Zaire received nearly half the foreign aid Carter allocated to sub-Saharan Africa. During the first Shaba invasion, the United States played a relatively inconsequential role; its belated intervention consisted of little more than the delivery of non-lethal supplies. But during the second Shaba invasion, the US played a much more active and decisive role by providing transportation and logistical support to the French and Belgian paratroopers that were deployed to aid Mobutu against the rebels. Carter echoed Mobutu's (unsubstantiated) charges of Soviet and Cuban aid to the rebels, until it was apparent that no hard evidence existed to verify his claims. In 1980, the US House of Representatives voted to terminate military aid to Zaire, but the US Senate reinstated the funds, in response to pressure from Carter and American business interests in Zaire.

Mobutu enjoyed a very warm relationship with the Reagan Administration, through financial donations. During Reagan's presidency, Mobutu visited the White House three times, and criticism of Zaire's human rights record by the US was effectively muted. During a state visit by Mobutu in 1983, Reagan praised the Zairian strongman as "a voice of good sense and goodwill".

Mobutu also had a cordial relationship with Reagan's successor, George H. W. Bush; he was the first African head of state to visit Bush at the White House. Even so, Mobutu's relationship with the US radically changed shortly afterward with the end of the Cold War. With the end of the Soviet Union's status as a world superpower, there was no longer any reason to support Mobutu as a bulwark against communism. Accordingly, the US and other Western powers began pressuring Mobutu to democratize the regime. Regarding the change in US attitude to his regime, Mobutu bitterly remarked: "I am the latest victim of the cold war, no longer needed by the US. The lesson is that my support for American policy counts for nothing." In 1993, Mobutu was denied a visa by the US State Department after he sought to visit Washington, D.C.

Mobutu also had friends in America outside Washington. Mobutu was befriended by televangelist Pat Robertson, who promised to try to get the State Department to lift its ban on the African leader.

== Coalition government ==
In May 1990, due to the ending of the Cold War and a change in the international political climate, as well as economic problems and domestic unrest, Mobutu agreed to give up the MPR's monopoly of power. In early May 1990, students studying at the Lubumbashi campus of the National University of Zaire protested against Mobutu's regime, demanding his resignation. On the night of 11 May 1990, electricity was cut off to the campus while a special military unit called Les Hiboux ("The Owls") were sent in, armed with machetes and bayonets. By the dawn of 12 May 1990, at least 290 students had been killed. The massacre led to the nations of the European Economic Community (now the European Union), the United States, and Canada to end all non-humanitarian aid to Zaire, which marked the beginning of the end of Western support for Mobutu.

Mobutu appointed a transitional government that would lead to promised elections but he retained substantial powers. Following the 1991 riots in Kinshasa by unpaid soldiers, Mobutu brought opposition figures into a coalition government, but still connived to retain control of the security services and important ministries. Factional divisions led to the creation of two governments in 1993, one pro- and one anti-Mobutu. The anti-Mobutu government was headed by Laurent Monsengwo and Étienne Tshisekedi of the Union for Democracy and Social Progress (UDPS).

The economic situation was still dismal, and in 1994 the two groups merged into the High Council of Republic – Parliament of Transition (HCR-PT). Mobutu appointed Kengo Wa Dondo, an advocate of austerity and free-market reforms, as prime minister. During this period, Mobutu was becoming increasingly physically frail and during one of his trips to Europe for medical treatment, ethnic Tutsis captured much of eastern Zaire.

== Overthrow ==
The seeds of Mobutu's downfall were sown in the Rwandan genocide, when about 800,000 Tutsis and moderate Hutus were massacred by about 200,000 Hutu extremists aided by the Rwandan government in 1994. The genocide ended when the Tutsi-dominated Rwandan Patriotic Front seized the whole country, leading hundreds of thousands of Hutus, including many of the génocidaires, to flee into refugee camps in eastern Zaire. Mobutu welcomed the Hutu extremists as personal guests and allowed them to establish military and political bases in the eastern territories, from where they attacked and killed ethnic Tutsis across the border in Rwanda and in Zaire itself, ostensibly to prepare for a renewed offensive back into Rwanda. The new Rwandan government began sending military aid to the Zairian Tutsis in response. The resulting conflict began to destabilize eastern Zaire as a whole.

When Mobutu's government issued an order in November 1996 forcing Tutsis to leave Zaire on penalty of death, the ethnic Tutsis in Zaire, known as Banyamulenge, were the focal point of a rebellion. From eastern Zaire, the rebels, aided by foreign government forces under the leadership of President Yoweri Museveni of Uganda and Rwandan Minister of Defense Paul Kagame launched an offensive to overthrow Mobutu, joining forces with locals opposed to him under Laurent-Désiré Kabila as they marched west toward Kinshasa. Burundi and Angola supported the growing rebellion, which mushroomed into the First Congo War.

Ailing with cancer, Mobutu was in Switzerland for treatment, and he was unable to coordinate the resistance which crumbled in front of the march. The rebel forces would have completely overrun the country far sooner than it ultimately did if not for the country's decrepit infrastructure. In most areas, no paved roads existed; the only vehicle paths were irregularly used dirt roads.

By mid-1997, Kabila's forces resumed their advance, and the remains of Mobutu's army offered almost no resistance. On 16 May 1997, failed peace talks were held in Pointe-Noire on board the South African Navy ship SAS Outeniqua with Kabila and President of South Africa Nelson Mandela acting as the chair of the talks. The talks stalled as Kabila was reluctant to negotiate and deplete the momentum of his forces, seeing it as potentially giving Mobutu the advantage to regroup his forces. Kabila was also anxious about meeting Mobutu face to face on a personal basis, as the United Nations High Special Commission to the Great Lakes Region Spokesperson Timothy Montague Hamilton Douglas later stated: "In all the years I spent in contact with President Mobutu, this was the first time I ever saw him outshone in superstition [...] Although they sat together in the same room for hours, Kabila refused to look into the president's eyes during the meeting and instead stared at the ceiling; after some conferring with the Zairian and AFDL aides, I was able to discern that the prevailing rationale was that he [Kabila] was afraid that the "Old Leopard" still had enough magical power left to curse him with his stare and prevent him from reaching his prize, which he felt was now so close." Douglas went on to comment on the terse atmosphere at the talks: "It was very strange. It was the only time that the two rivals met, and after fighting him for 32 years and being catapulted to the national stage in only a few months, Kabila had remarkably little to say to his foe. As far as I remember, he said [to Mobutu to] hand over power and step down without any conditions; Mobutu, insulted by this treatment as one would imagine, limped off the boat, refusing to strike a deal. I remember President Mandela, 78 years old himself at this time, had to prop him up as he walked to his car [...] It was really dreadful; on May 15th they were to meet again, [and while] Mobutu made the journey, Kabila hadn't bothered to attend." Kabila's forces, known as the Alliance of Democratic Forces for the Liberation of Congo-Zaire (AFDL), proclaimed victory the next day. On 23 May 1997, Zaire was renamed the Democratic Republic of the Congo.

== Exile and death ==
Mobutu went into temporary exile in Togo, until President Gnassingbé Eyadéma insisted that Mobutu leave the country a few days later. From 23 May 1997, he lived mostly in Rabat, Morocco. He died there on 7 September 1997 from prostate cancer at the age of 66. He is interred in an above ground mausoleum at Rabat, in the Christian cemetery known as Cimetière Européen.

In December 2007, the National Assembly of the Democratic Republic of the Congo recommended returning his remains, and interring them in a mausoleum in the DRC, which has not yet taken place. Mobutu remains interred in Morocco.

== Family ==
Mobutu was married twice. He married his first wife, Marie-Antoinette Gbiatibwa Gogbe Yetene, in 1955. They had nine children. She died of heart failure on 22 October 1977 in Genolier, Switzerland, at the age of 36. On 1 May 1980, he married his mistress, Bobi Ladawa, on the eve of a visit by Pope John Paul II, thus legitimizing his relationship in the eyes of the Church. Two of his sons from his first marriage died during his lifetime, Nyiwa (d. 16 September 1994) and Konga (d. 1992). Three more died in the years following his death: Kongulu (d. 24 September 1998), Manda (d. 27 November 2004), and Ndokula (d. 4 November 2011). His elder son from his second marriage, Nzanga Mobutu, now the head of the family, finished fourth in the 2006 presidential elections and later served in the government of the Democratic Republic of the Congo as Minister of State and Deputy Prime Minister of the day government. Another son of his, Giala, has served in the government of the Democratic Republic of Congo as both a member of the National Assembly and the Senate. A daughter, Yakpwa (nicknamed Yaki), was briefly married to a Belgian, Pierre Janssen, who later wrote a book that described Mobutu's lifestyle in vivid detail.

Altogether, Mobutu had sixteen children:

- nine with Marie-Antoinette, his first wife: Nyiwa, Ngombo, Manda, Konga, Ngawali, Yango, Yakpwa, Kongulu, and Ndagbia
- four with Bobi Ladawa, his second wife: Nzanga, Giala, Toku, and Ndokula
- three with Kosia Ngama, his mistress and the twin sister of his second wife: Yalitho, Tende, and Ayessa

== In art and literature ==
Mobutu was the subject of the three-part 1999 Belgian documentary Mobutu, King of Zaire by Thierry Michel. He was featured in the 2000 feature film Lumumba, directed by Raoul Peck, which detailed the pre-coup and coup years from the perspective of Lumumba. He featured in the 1996 American documentary When We Were Kings, which centred on the famed Rumble in the Jungle boxing bout between George Foreman and Muhammad Ali for the 1974 heavyweight championship of the world which took place in Kinshasa during Mobutu's rule. In the 1978 war adventure film The Wild Geese, the villain, General Ndofa, described in the film as an extremely corrupt leader of a copper-rich nation in central Africa, was a thinly disguised version of Mobutu. In 2025, a Belgian documentary-thriller on Mobutu's geopolitical game, Mobuto's Game, was released.

Mobutu might be considered as the inspiration behind some of the characters in the works of the poetry of Wole Soyinka, the novel A Bend in the River by V. S. Naipaul, and Anthills of the Savannah by Chinua Achebe. William Close, father of actress Glenn Close, was once a personal physician to Mobutu and wrote a book focusing on his service in Zaire. Barbara Kingsolver's 1998 historical novel The Poisonwood Bible depicts the events of the Congo Crisis from a fictional standpoint, featuring the role of Mobutu in the crisis. Mobutu was played by the Belgian actor Marc Zinga in the 2011 film Mister Bob. The French critic Isabelle Hanne praised Zinga's performance as Mobutu, writing he "brilliantly embodies this Shakespearian and bloodthirsty figure."

Mobutu was included as an additional promotional card in the card-driven strategy game Twilight Struggle. His card, when played, increases the stability of the country then known as Zaire and increases the influence of the United States over the African nation. The 2015 song "Françafrique" by Swedish hardcore punk band Refused (from the album Freedom) directly references Mobutu in its lyrics — the song contains the lines: "Mobutu, Congo; pimp and whore / As Paris' puppets guard the door". Rap duo Armand Hammer directly reference Mobutu in their song "Tabula Rasa": "Kofi Annan in the booth, Soyinka in the stu / Sese Seko Mobutu if the DJ play something smooth."

== Legacy ==
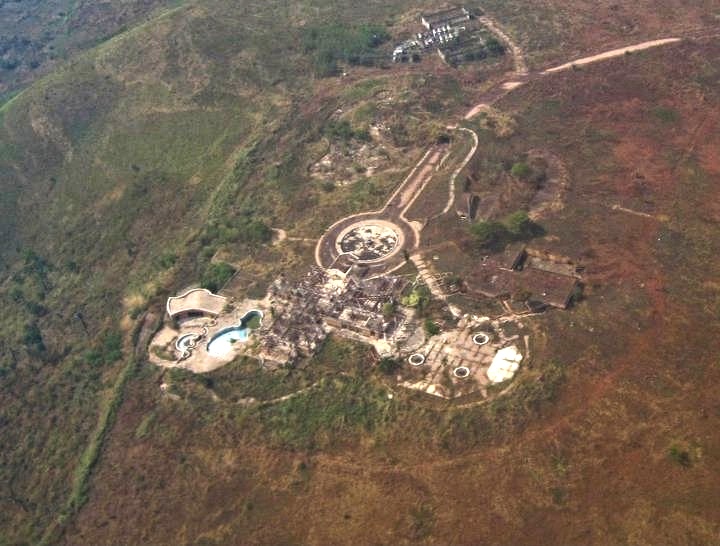
Mobutu's palace in his hometown of Gbadolite, ransacked after he was deposed and exiled. Photographed c. 2010

According to Mobutu's New York Times obituary: "He built his political longevity on three pillars: violence, cunning, and the use of state funds to buy off enemies. His systematic looting of the national treasury and major industries gave birth to the term 'kleptocracy' to describe a rule of official corruption that reputedly made him one of the world's wealthiest heads of state."

In 2011, Time magazine described him as the "archetypal African dictator".

Mobutu was infamous for amassing the equivalent of millions of US dollars from his country. According to the most conservative estimates, he stole US$50–125 million from his country, and some sources put the figure as high as US$150 million. According to Pierre Janssen, the ex-husband of Mobutu's daughter Yaki, Mobutu had no concern for the cost of the expensive gifts he gave away to his cronies. Janssen married Yaki in a lavish ceremony that included three orchestras, a US$65,000 wedding cake, and a giant fireworks display. Yaki wore a US$70,000 wedding gown and US$3 million worth of jewels. Janssen wrote a book describing Mobutu's daily routine, which included several daily bottles of wine, retainers flown in from overseas, and lavish meals.

According to Washington Post, Mobutu amassed between US$50–125 million from his country, ranking him as the third-most corrupt leader since 1984 and the most corrupt African leader during the same period. Philip Gourevitch, in We Wish to Inform You That Tomorrow We Will Be Killed with Our Families (1998), wrote:

Mobutu had really staged a funeral for a generation of African leadership of which he—the Dinosaur, as he had long been known—was the paragon: the client dictator of Cold War neocolonialism, monomaniacal, perfectly corrupt, and absolutely ruinous to his nation.

Mobutu was instrumental in bringing the Rumble in the Jungle boxing match between Muhammad Ali and George Foreman to Zaire on 30 October 1974. According to the documentary When We Were Kings, promoter Don King promised each fighter five million dollars (U.S.) for the fight. To this end, King offered the bout to any African country that put up the money to host it, in exchange for recognition. Mobutu was willing to fund the ten million dollar purse and host the bout, in order to gain international recognition and legitimacy in the process. Mobutu gained Zaire and its people considerable publicity in the weeks even before the televised bout, as worldwide attention focused on his country. According to a quote in the film, Ali supposedly said: "Some countries go to war to get their names out there, and wars cost a lot more than ten million (dollars)." On 22 September 1974, Mobutu presented the rebuilt 20 May Stadium, a multi-million-dollar sports project constructed to host the Ali-Foreman boxing card, to the Zaire Ministry of Youth and Sport, and to the people of Zaire.

== Awards and honors ==
=== National ===
- Zaire:
  - National Order of the Leopard

=== Foreign ===
- Belgium:
  - Grand Cordon of the Order of Leopold (1969)
- Imperial Iran:
  - Commemorative Medal of the 2500th Anniversary of the Founding of the Persian Empire (1971)
- Italy:
  - Knight Grand Cross with Collar of the Order of Merit of the Italian Republic (1973)
- Netherlands:
  - Order of the Golden Ark (1973)
- Portugal:
  - Grand Collar of the Order of Prince Henry (1984)
- Spain:
  - Knight of the Collar of the Order of Isabella the Catholic (1983)
- South Korea:
  - Grand Order of Mugunghwa (1982)
- Taiwan:
  - Grand Cordon of the Order of Brilliant Jade (1971)
- United Kingdom:
  - Honorary Knight Grand Cross of the Order of the Bath (1973)
- United States:
  - Commander of the Legion of Merit (1964)

== See also ==
- Kisangani battle (1997)

== General and cited references ==
=== Books ===
==== English ====
- Ayittey, George B.N. Africa in Chaos: A Comparative History. Palgrave Macmillan. ISBN 0-312-21787-0
- Burke, Kyle (2018). Revolutionaries for the Right Anticommunist Internationalism and Paramilitary Warfare in the Cold War. Chapel Hill: University of North Carolina Press. ISBN 978-1-4696-4074-7.
- Callaghy, Thomas M. Politics and Culture in Zaire. Center for Political Studies. ASIN B00071MTTW
- Callaghy, Thomas M. State-Society Struggle: Zaire in Comparative Perspective. Columbia University Press. ISBN 0-231-05720-2
- Close, William T. Beyond the Storm: Treating the Powerless & the Powerful in Mobutu's Congo/Zaire. Meadowlark Springs Production. ISBN 0-9703371-4-0
- De Witte, Ludo. The Assassination of Lumumba. Verso. ISBN 1-85984-410-3

Edgerton, Robert (2002). The Troubled Heart of Africa: A History of the Congo. New York: St. Martin's Press. ISBN 978-0-312-30486-7.

- Elliot, Jeffrey M., and Mervyn M. Dymally (eds.). Voices of Zaire: Rhetoric or Reality. Washington Institute Press. ISBN 0-88702-045-3
- French, Howard W. A Continent for the Taking: The Tragedy and Hope of Africa. Vintage. ISBN 1-4000-3027-7
- Gerard, Emmanuel, and Kuklick, Bruce. Death in the Congo: Murdering Patrice Lumumba, 2015, Harvard University Press. ISBN 978-0-674-72527-0
- Gould, David. Bureaucratic Corruption and Underdevelopment in the Third World: The Case of Zaire. ASIN B0006E1JR8
- Gran, Guy, and Galen Hull (eds.). Zaire: The Political Economy of Underdevelopment. ISBN 0-275-90358-3
- Harden, Blaine. Africa: Dispatches from a Fragile Continent. Houghton Mifflin Company. ISBN 0-395-59746-3
- Hoskyns, Catherine (1965). The Congo Since Independence: January 1960 – December 1961. London: Oxford University Press. OCLC 414961.
- Kanza, Thomas R. (1994). The Rise and Fall of Patrice Lumumba: Conflict in the Congo (expanded ed.). Rochester, Vermont: Schenkman Books, Inc. ISBN 978-0-87073-901-9.
- Kelly, Sean. America's Tyrant: The CIA and Mobutu of Zaire. American University Press. ISBN 1-879383-17-9
- Kenyon, Paul (2018). Dictatorland: The Men Who Stole Africa. London: Head of Zeus. ISBN 9-781784-972141.
- Kingsolver, Barbara. The Poisonwood Bible. HarperCollins. ISBN 0-606-19420-7
- Kisangani, Emizet F. (2016). Historical Dictionary of the Democratic Republic of the Congo. Latham: Rowman & Littlefield Publishers. ISBN 978-1-4422-7316-0.
- MacGaffey, Janet (ed.). The Real Economy of Zaire: The Contribution of Smuggling and Other Unofficial Activities to National Wealth. Philadelphia: University of Pennsylvania Press. ISBN 0-8122-1365-3
- Meditz, Sandra W. and Tim Merrill. Zaire: A Country Study. Claitor's Law Books and Publishing Division. ISBN 1-57980-162-5
- Mokoli, Mondonga M. State Against Development: The Experience of Post-1965 Zaire. New York: Greenwood Press. ISBN 0-313-28213-7
- Mwakikagile, Godfrey. Nyerere and Africa: End of an Era, 2006, Chapter Six: "Congo in The 1960s: The Bleeding Heart of Africa." New Africa Press, South Africa. ISBN 978-0-9802534-1-2; Mwakikagile, Godfrey. Africa is in A Mess: What Went Wrong and What Should Be Done, 2006. New Africa Press. ISBN 978-0-9802534-7-4
- Nzongola-Ntalaja, Georges. The Congo: From Leopold to Kabila: A People's History. Zed Books. ISBN 1-84277-053-5
- Odom, Thomas Paul (1993). Shaba II The French and Belgian Intervention in Zaire in 1978. Fort Leavenworth: U.S. Army Command and General Staff College, Combat Studies Institute. ISBN 978-1-83931-097-3.
- Reid, Stuart A. (2023). The Lumumba Plot. New York: Alfred A. Knopf. ISBN 978-1-5247-4881-4.
- Sandbrook, Richard (1985). The Politics of Africa's Economic Stagnation. Cambridge University Press. ISBN 0-521-31961-7
- Schatzberg, Michael G. The Dialectics of Oppression in Zaire. Indiana University Press. ISBN 0-253-20694-4
- Schatzberg, Michael G. Mobutu or Chaos? University Press of America. ISBN 0-8191-8130-7
- Stockwell, John. In Search of Enemies, W. W. Norton; First Edition (17 March 1984) ISBN 0393009262
- Taylor, Jeffrey. Facing the Congo: A Modern-Day Journey into the Heart of Darkness. Three Rivers Press. ISBN 0609808265
- wa Muiu, Mueni; Martin, Guy (2009). A new paradigm of the African state: fundi wa Afrika. Springer. ISBN 978-0-230-61831-2.
- Young, Crawford; Turner, Thomas (1985). The Rise and Decline of the Zairian State. Madison: University of Wisconsin Press. ISBN 978-0-299-10113-8.
- Young, Crawford (2015). Politics in Congo: Decolonization and Independence (reprint ed.). Princeton University Press. ISBN 978-1-4008-7857-4.

==== French ====
- Braeckman, Colette. Le Dinosaure, le Zaïre de Mobutu. Fayard. ISBN 2-213-02863-X
- Chomé, Jules. L'ascension de Mobutu: Du sergent Désiré Joseph au général Sese Seko. F. Maspero. ISBN 2-7071-1075-2
- Dungia, Emmanuel, Mobutu et l'Argent du Zaïre, les révélations d'un diplomate, ex-agent des Services secrets. L'Harmattan. ISBN 2-7384-1133-9, ISBN 978-2-7384-1133-4.
- Mobutu Sese Seko. Discours, allocutions et messages, 1965–1975. Éditions J.A. ISBN 2-85258-022-5
- Monheim, Francis. Mobutu, l'homme seul. Editions Actuelles. (Unknown ISBN)
- Ngbanda Nzambo-ku-Atumba, Honoré. Ainsi sonne le glas! Les Derniers Jours du Maréchal Mobutu. Gideppe. ISBN 2-9512000-2-1
- Nguza Karl-i-Bond, Jean. Mobutu ou l'Incarnation du Mal Zairois. Bellew Publishing Co Ltd. ISBN 0-86036-197-7

==== Other ====
- Shaw, Karl (2005) [2004]. Power Mad! [Šílenství mocných] (in Czech). Praha: Metafora. ISBN 978-80-7359-002-4.

Political offices
Preceded by Joseph Kasa Vubu as President of the Republic of the Congo	President of Zaire (before 1971 President of the Democratic Republic of the Congo); 24 November 1965 – 16 May 1997	Succeeded by Laurent-Désiré Kabila as President of the Democratic Republic of the Congo
