= EGK =

EGK or egk may refer to:

- EGK, code for a variant of the Chrysler SOHC V6 engine 3.5
- EGK, shortening of Einzelgrabkultur (Single Grave culture)
- Egk, early name for Brda, Radovljica
- Egk, early name for Brdo pri Lukovici
- EGK, great-grandparent of racehorse Aldaniti
- Egk, name of several Bavarian noble families
- École de Guerre de Kinshasa, part of Group of Military Higher Schools
- EGK, letters used to represent European Economic Community in identification marks
- eGK, short for Elektronische Gesundheitskarte, supplier of medical records in Germany
- Werner Egk (1901–1983), German composer
