= Mosambaye Singa Boyenge =

Congolese military officer

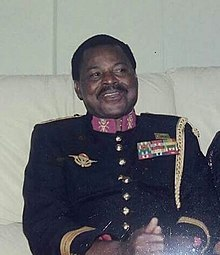
- Born: Alexandre Singa Boyenge; October 10, 1932; Eastern Province, Belgian Congo
- Died: July 21, 2001 (aged 68); Kinshasa, Democratic Republic of the Congo
- Military career
- Allegiance: Democratic Republic of Congo
- Service years: 1960–1980
- Rank: General
- Conflicts: Congo Crisis; Shaba invasions

General Mosambaye Singa Boyenge (October 10, 1932 – July 21, 2001) was a Congolese military officer and statesman. He served as the chief of staff of the Zairian Armed Forces during the rule of Mobutu Sese Seko.

== Career ==
He became a lieutenant in 1960, at the independence of the former Belgian Congo, and rose to the rank of army general in January 1980.

After the fighting of the secession of Katanga in 1963, those against the rebellion of the troops of the East a year later, the confrontation in Kivu and in the Eastern province of Jean Schrame and the war of "80 days" where it succeeds to repel the invaders from Zairian territory, he was appointed military governor of Shaba (present-day Katanga) at the end of the so-called "6-day" battle in 1978.

General Singa Boyenge also held political office in the Popular Movement of the Revolution (MPR). In the diplomatic field, he was also a military attache at the Zaire embassy in Rome in 1969, and ambassador of Zaire in Uganda in 1970.

On June 11, 1975, as chief of the gendarmerie at that time, he led a revolutionary commission to investigate the coup d'état against the government (now known as "The coup d'etat monté et manqué"). This commission arrested several army officers, accused of conspiracy against Mobutu (attempted assassination), high treason and disclosure of military secrets.
