= Armed Forces of the Democratic Republic of the Congo =

Military forces of the DR Congo

- Forces armées de la République démocratique du Congo
- Insignia of FARDC
- Founded: 30 June 1960
- Current form: 17 May 1997
- Service branches: Land Forces of the Democratic Republic of the Congo; Democratic Republic of the Congo Air Force; Democratic Republic of the Congo Navy
- Headquarters: Colonel Tshatshi Military Camp, Kinshasa
- Website: fardc.org

Leadership
- President: Félix Tshisekedi
- Minister of Defence and Veterans: Guy Kabombo Muadiamvita
- Chief of General Staff: Army General Jules Banza Mwilambwe

Personnel
- Military age: As of 2008, there are 'nearly 20,000' soldiers that are over 60 years old.
- Active personnel: 123,300 (IISS 2026); 197,380 (30,800 inactive) (mid-2021)

Expenditure
- Budget: US$2.55 billion (2026 est.)
- Percent of GDP: 1.116 (2023 est.)

Industry
- Domestic suppliers: At least one ammunition plant in Likasi.
- Foreign suppliers: See "Equipment" below

Related articles
- Ranks: Military ranks

The Armed Forces of the Democratic Republic of the Congo (French: Forces armées de la république démocratique du Congo, FARDC) are the national military forces responsible for defending the sovereignty and territorial integrity of the Democratic Republic of the Congo. The modern Congolese army descends from the Force Publique (1885–1960) of the Congo Free State and Belgian Congo and has undergone multiple reorganizations and name changes since independence, including the Armée nationale congolaise (ANC) following independence, the Forces armées zaïroises (FAZ) during the Zaire period, and the Forces armées congolaises (FAC) under Laurent-Désiré Kabila, before adopting its current designation as the FARDC.

The FARDC was rebuilt in a fragmented and uneven manner following the end of the Second Congo War in July 2003, as part of the broader peace process that sought to integrate former government troops, rebel movements, and militia groups into a unified national army. Its legal foundation was initially established under the Transitional Constitution, notably articles 118 and 188, and later superseded by the 2006 Constitution, particularly articles 187 to 192. The overall framework for national defence and the armed forces was further outlined in Law No. 04/023 of 12 November 2004, and subsequently clarified by Organic Law No. 11-012 of August 2011, which regulates the organization, command, and use of the FARDC. The armed forces is composed predominantly of land forces, alongside a small air force and an even smaller naval component, while the country also maintains a separate presidential force known as the Republican Guard and an independently operating Congolese National Police (PNC), neither of which is formally part of the armed forces. The national territory is divided into three major defence zones, supported by military regions, bases, and specialized air and naval groupings. Since 2014, these forces have operated under three regional combatant commands corresponding to the western, south-central, and eastern regions of the country.

Since independence, and throughout its successive institutional forms, the Congolese army has been repeatedly engaged in mutinies, rebellions, and secessionist conflicts. These have included the Kwilu rebellion and eastern uprisings of 1964; the mutinies of former Katangese Gendarmerie in Stanleyville; the war of Bukavu involving Jean Schramme's 10th Commando Battalion in 1967; mercenary attacks on Luashi and Kisenge in November 1967 under the command of Bob Denard; the "Eighty Days' War" (quatre-vingt jours) of March–June 1977; the Battle of Kolwezi of May 1978; the conflicts known as Moba I and Moba II; Shaba I and Shaba II; and the First and Second Congo Wars. During the Second Congo War, the United Nations established a peacekeeping presence through Security Council Resolutions 1279 (1999) and 1291 (2000), leading to the creation of the United Nations Mission in the Democratic Republic of the Congo (MONUC), later renamed MONUSCO. The mission was tasked with monitoring the peace process and assisting post-war governments, and until 2023 maintained a force of more than 16,000 peacekeepers in the country, with a primary focus on security in eastern provinces such as North Kivu and South Kivu, as well as support for national reconstruction efforts. The Congolese government, in cooperation with the United Nations, the European Union, and bilateral partners including Angola, South Africa, and Belgium, attempted to create a viable force with the ability to provide the Democratic Republic of Congo with stability and security. However, this process has been hampered by corruption, inadequate donor coordination, and competition between donors.

Foreign armed groups have also operated on Congolese territory for much of the post-independence period. Among the most significant have been the M23, FDLR, ADF, CODECO, Mai-Mai, alongside other groups such as the anti-Ugandan Lord's Resistance Army.

== History ==
=== Background ===
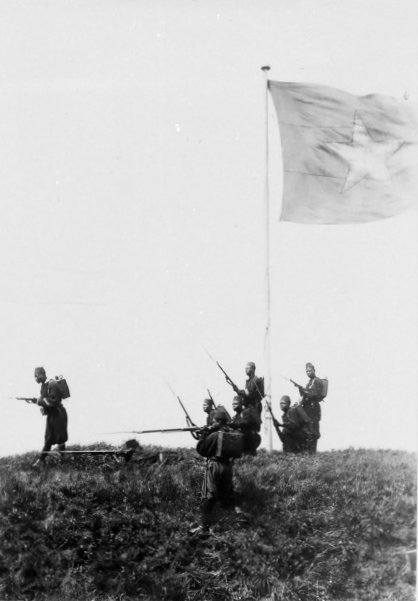
Congolese soldiers of the colonial-era Force Publique pictured in 1928

The first organized Congolese troops, known as the Force Publique, were created in 1888 when King Leopold II of Belgium, who held the Congo Free State as his private property, ordered his Secretary of the Interior to create military and police forces for the state. In 1886, many Belgian officers were dispatched to the Congo Free State to set up this military force. The Force Publique was not composed solely of Belgian officers; it also included Swedes, Danes, and other Europeans. The rank-and-file soldiers were predominantly African, with a significant proportion recruited from local Congolese populations. In 1908, under international pressure, Leopold ceded administration of the colony to the government of Belgium as the Belgian Congo. It remained under the command of a Belgian officer corps through to the independence of the colony in 1960.

Force Publique conducted military campaigns during the First World War (1914–1918), notably in East and Central Africa, notably in Cameroon and German East Africa (present-day Tanzania), including Rwanda and Burundi. It achieved several military successes (Tabora, Mahenge), and earned the respect and confidence of its Portuguese and British allies. During this period, the Force Publique was organized into 21 companies, in addition to separate artillery and engineering units. Each company was to include four European officers and 150 African soldiers, of whom 80 were Congolese. Historical records indicate that Belgian and Congolese officers gradually replaced Europeans from various bodies that had previously formed the officer corps under the Congo Free State. The troops deployed in Katanga were organized as a distinct autonomous force consisting of six companies and a cyclist unit. Force Publique overall comprised a strength of 12,100 men, distributed among the twenty-one companies. Over time, by around 1914, the Force Publique already numbered approximately 17,000 soldiers, recruited under a quota system, with forced recruitment practices continuing.

=== Independence and revolt ===
At independence on 30 June 1960, the army suffered from a dramatic deficit of trained leaders, particularly in the officer corps. This was because the Force Publique had always only been officered by Belgian or other expatriate whites. The Belgian Government made no effort to train Congolese commissioned officers until the very end of the colonial period, and in 1958, only 23 African cadets had been admitted even to the military secondary school. The highest rank available to Congolese was adjutant, which only four soldiers achieved before independence. (Note: Willame states that 10 adjutants were nominated shortly before independence due to intense political pressure.) Though 14 Congolese cadets were enrolled in the Royal Military Academy in Brussels in May, they were not scheduled to graduate as second lieutenants until 1963. Ill-advised actions by Belgian officers led to an enlisted ranks' rebellion on 5 July 1960, which helped spark the Congo Crisis. Lieutenant General Émile Janssens, the Force Publique commander, wrote during a meeting of soldiers that 'Before independence=After Independence', pouring cold water on the soldiers' desires for an immediate raise in their status.

Historian Louis-François Vanderstraeten says that on the morning of 8 July 1960, following a night during which all control had been lost over the soldiers, numerous ministers arrived at Camp Leopold with the aim of calming the situation. Both Prime Minister Patrice Lumumba and President Joseph Kasa-Vubu eventually arrived, and the soldiers listened to Kasa-Vubu "religiously." After his speech, Kasa-Vubu and the ministers present retired into the camp canteen to hear a delegation from the soldiers. Vanderstraeten says that, according to Joseph Ileo, their demands (revendications) included the following:

- that the defence portfolio not be given to the Prime Minister
- that the name Force Publique be changed to Armée Nationale Congolaise (ANC)
- and that the commander-in-chief and chief of staff should not necessarily be Belgians

The "laborious" discussions which then followed were later retrospectively given the label of an "extraordinary ministerial council." Gérard-Libois writes that "...the special meeting of the council of ministers took steps for the immediate Africanisation of the officer corps and named Victor Lundula, who was born in Kasai and was burgomaster of Jadotville, as Commander-in-Chief of the ANC; Colonel Joseph-Désiré Mobutu as chief of staff; and the Belgian, Colonel Henniquiau, as chief advisor to the ANC". Thus General Janssens was dismissed. Both Lundula and Mobutu were former sergeants of the Force Publique.

On 8–9 July 1960, the soldiers were invited to appoint black officers, and "command of the army passed securely into the hands of former sergeants," as the soldiers in general chose the most-educated and highest-ranked Congolese army soldiers as their new officers. Most of the Belgian officers were retained as advisors to the new Congolese hierarchy, and calm returned to the two main garrisons at Leopoldville and Thysville. The Force Publique was renamed the Armée nationale congolaise (ANC), or Congolese National Armed Forces. However, in Katanga Belgian officers resisted the Africanisation of the army.

There was a Force Publique mutiny at Camp Massart, in Elizabethville, on 9 July 1960; five or seven Europeans were killed. The army revolt and resulting rumours caused severe panic across the country, and Belgium dispatched troops and the naval Task Group 218.2 to protect its citizens. Belgian troops intervened in Elisabethville and Luluabourg (10 July), Matadi (11 July), Leopoldville (13 July) and elsewhere. There were immediate suspicions that Belgium planned to re-seize their former colony whilst doing so. Large numbers of Belgian colonists fled the country. At the same time, on 11 July, Moise Tshombe declared the independence of Katanga Province in the south-east, closely backed by remaining Belgian administrators and soldiers.

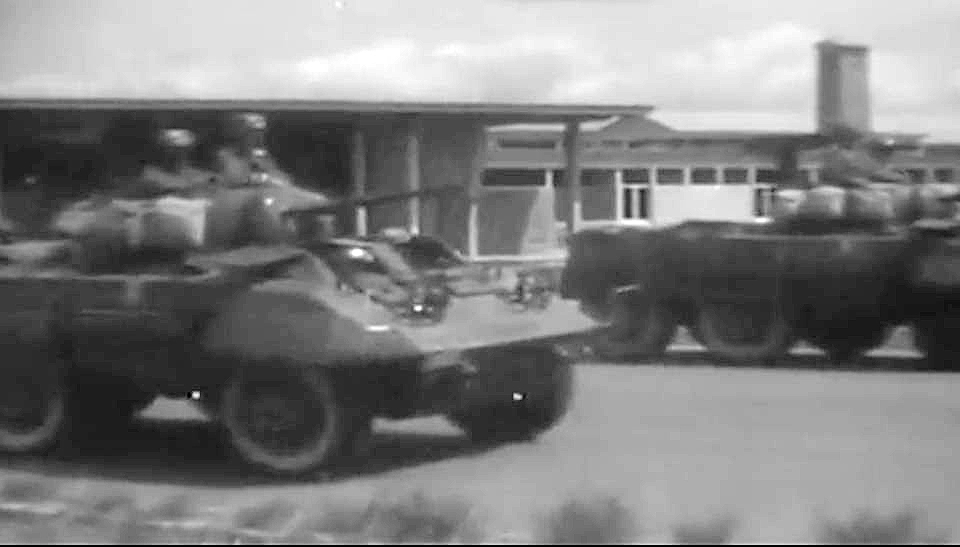
Armée nationale congolaise (ANC) armoured vehicles during the Congo Crisis

On 14 July 1960, in response to requests by Prime Minister Lumumba, the UN Security Council adopted United Nations Security Council Resolution 143. This called upon Belgium to remove its troops and for the UN to provide military assistance to the Congolese forces to allow them "to meet fully their tasks". Lumumba demanded that Belgium remove its troops immediately, threatening to seek help from the Soviet Union if they did not leave within two days. The UN reacted quickly and established the United Nations Operation in the Congo (ONUC). The first UN troops arrived the next day but there was instant disagreement between Lumumba and the UN over the new force's mandate. Because the Congolese army had been in disarray since the mutiny, Lumumba wanted to use the UN troops to subdue Katanga by force. Lumumba became extremely frustrated with the UN's unwillingness to use force against Tshombe and his secession. He cancelled a scheduled meeting with Secretary General Dag Hammarskjöld on 14 August and wrote a series of angry letters instead. To Hammarskjöld, the secession of Katanga was an internal Congolese matter and the UN was forbidden to intervene by Article 2 of the United Nations Charter. Disagreements over what the UN force could and could not do continued throughout its deployment.

A total of 3,500 troops for ONUC had arrived in the Congo by 20 July 1960. The first contingent of Belgian forces had left Leopoldville on 16 July upon the arrival of the United Nations troops. Following assurances that contingents of the Force would arrive in sufficient numbers, the Belgian authorities agreed to withdraw all their forces from the Leopoldville area by 23 July. The last Belgian troops left the country by 23 July, as United Nations forces continued to deploy throughout the Congo. The build of ONUC continued, its strength increasing to over 8,000 by 25 July and to over 11,000 by 31 July 1960. A basic agreement between the United Nations and the Congolese Government on the operation of the Force was agreed by 27 July. On 9 August, Albert Kalonji proclaimed the independence of South Kasai.

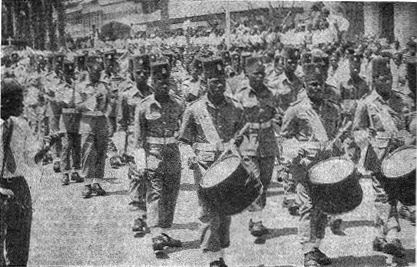
ANC parade in 1960

During the crucial period of July–August 1960, Mobutu built up "his" national army by channeling foreign aid to units loyal to him, by exiling unreliable units to remote areas, and by absorbing or dispersing rival armies. He tied individual officers to him by controlling their promotion and the flow of money for payrolls. Researchers working from the 1990s have concluded that money was directly funnelled to the army by the U.S. Central Intelligence Agency, the United Nations, and Belgium. Despite this, by September 1960, following the four-way division of the country, there were four separate armed forces: Mobotu's ANC itself, numbering about 12,000, the South Kasai Constabulary loyal to Albert Kalonji (3,000 or less), the Katanga Gendarmerie which were part of Moise Tshombe's regime (totalling about 10,000), and the Stanleyville dissident ANC loyal to Antoine Gizenga (numbering about 8,000).

In August 1960, due to the rejection of requests for UN assistance to suppress the South Kasai and Katanga revolts, Lumumba's government decided to request Soviet help. De Witte writes that "Leopoldville asked the Soviet Union for planes, lorries, arms, and equipment...Shortly afterwards, on 22 or 23 August, about 1,000 soldiers left for Kasai." On 26–27 August, the ANC seized Bakwanga, Albert Kalonji's capital in South Kasai, without serious resistance and, according to de Witte, "in the next two days it temporarily put an end to the secession of Kasai."

At this point, the Library of Congress Country Study for the Congo says, that on 5 September 1960: "Kasavubu also appointed Mobutu as head of the ANC. Joseph Ileo was chosen as the new prime minister and began trying to form a new government. Lumumba and his cabinet responded by accusing Kasa-Vubu of high treason and voted to dismiss him. Parliament refused to confirm the dismissal of either Lumumba or Kasavubu and sought to bring about a reconciliation between them. After a week's deadlock, Mobutu announced on 14 September that he was assuming power until 31 December 1960, in order to "neutralize" both Kasavubu and Lumumba." Mobutu formed the College of Commissioners-General, a technocratic government of university graduates.

In early January 1961, ANC units loyal to Lumumba invaded northern Katanga to support a revolt of Baluba tribesmen against Tshombe's secessionist regime. On 23 January 1961, Kasa-Vubu promoted Mobutu to major-general; De Witte argues that this was a political move, "aimed to strengthen the army, the president's sole support, and Mobutu's position within the army."

United Nations Security Council Resolution 161 of 21 February 1961, called for the withdrawal of Belgian officers from command positions in the ANC, and the training of new Congolese officers with UN help. ONUC made a number of attempts to retrain the ANC from August 1960 to June 1963, often been set back by political changes. By March 1963 however, after the visit of Colonel Michael Greene of the United States Army, and the resulting "Greene Plan", the pattern of bilaterally agreed military assistance to various Congolese military components, instead of a single unified effort, was already taking shape.

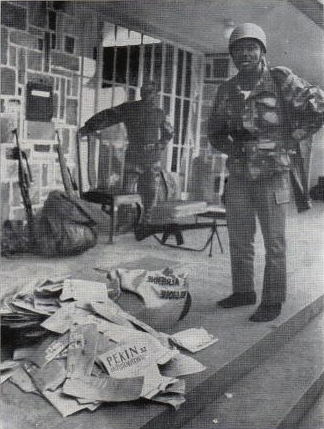
Congolese soldiers with seized rebel propaganda in 1964

In early 1964, a new crisis broke out as Congolese rebels calling themselves "Simba" (Swahili for "Lion") rebelled against the government. They were led by Pierre Mulele, Gaston Soumialot and Christophe Gbenye who were former members of Gizenga's Parti Solidaire Africain (PSA). The rebellion affected Kivu and Eastern (Orientale) provinces. By August they had captured Stanleyville and set up a rebel government there. As the rebel movement spread, discipline became more difficult to maintain, and acts of violence and terror increased. Thousands of Congolese were executed, including government officials, political leaders of opposition parties, provincial and local police, school teachers, and others believed to have been Westernised. Many of the executions were carried out with extreme cruelty, in front of a monument to Lumumba in Stanleyville. Tshombe decided to use foreign mercenaries as well as the ANC to suppress the rebellion. Mike Hoare was employed to create the English-speaking 5 Commando at Kamina, with the assistance of a Belgian officer, Colonel Frederic Vanderwalle, while 6 Commando (Congo) was French-speaking and originally under the command of a Belgian Army colonel, Lamouline. By August 1964, the mercenaries, with the assistance of other ANC troops, were making headway against the Simba rebellion. Fearing defeat, the rebels started taking hostages of the local white population in areas under their control. These hostages were rescued in Belgian airdrops (Operations Dragon Rouge and Dragon Noir) over Stanleyville and Paulis airlifted by U.S. aircraft. The operation coincided with the arrival of mercenary units (seemingly including the hurriedly formed 5th Mechanised Brigade) at Stanleyville which was quickly captured. It took until the end of the year to completely put down the remaining areas of rebellion during "Operation South".

After five years of turbulence, in 1965 Mobutu used his position as ANC Chief of Staff to seize power in the 1965 Democratic Republic of the Congo coup d'état. Although Mobutu succeeded in taking power, his position was soon threatened by the Stanleyville mutinies, also known as the Mercenaries' Mutinies, which were eventually suppressed.

As a general rule, since that time, the armed forces have not intervened in politics as a body, rather being tossed and turned as ambitious men have shaken the country. In reality, the larger problem has been the misuse and sometimes abuse of the military and police by political and ethnic leaders.

On 16 May 1968 a parachute brigade of two regiments (each of three battalions) was formed which eventually was to grow in size to a full division.

=== Zaire (1971–1997) ===
The country was renamed Zaire in 1971 and the army was consequently designated the Forces Armées Zaïroises (FAZ). In 1971 the army's force consisted of the 1st Groupement at Kananga, with one guard battalion, two infantry battalions, and a gendarmerie battalion attached, and the 2nd Groupement (Kinshasa), the 3rd Groupement (Kisangani), the 4th Groupement (Lubumbashi), the 5th Groupement (Bukavu), the 6th Groupement (Mbandaka), and the 7th Groupement (Boma). Each was about the size of a brigade, and commanded by aging generals who have had no military training, and often not much positive experience, since they were NCOs in the Belgian Force Publique.' By the late 1970s the number of groupements reached nine, one per administrative region. The parachute division (Division des Troupes Aéroportées Renforcées de Choc, DITRAC) operated semi-independently from the rest of the army.

In July 1972 a number of the aging generals commanding the groupements were retired. Général d'armée Louis Bobozo, and Generaux de Corps d'Armée Nyamaseko Mata Bokongo, Nzoigba Yeu Ngoli, Muke Massaku, Ingila Grima, Itambo Kambala Wa Mukina, Tshinyama Mpemba, and General de Division Yossa Yi Ayira, the last having been commander of the Kamina base, were all retired on 25 July 1972. Taking over as military commander-in-chief, now titled Captain General, was newly promoted General de Division Bumba Moaso, former commander of the parachute division.

A large number of countries supported the FAZ in the early 1970s. Three hundred Belgian personnel were serving as staff officers and advisors throughout the Ministry of Defence, Italians were supporting the Air Force, Americans were assisting with transport and communications, Israelis with airborne forces training, and there were British advisors with the engineers. In 1972 the state-sponsored political organisation, the Mouvement Populaire de la Révolution (MPR), resolved at a party congress to form activist cells in each military unit. The decision caused consternation among the officer corps, as the army had been apolitical (and even anti-political) since before independence.

On 11 June 1975 several military officers were arrested in what became known as the coup monté et manqué. Amongst those arrested were Générals Daniel Katsuva wa Katsuvira, Land Forces Chief of Staff, Utshudi Wembolenga, Commandant of the 2nd Military Region at Kalemie; Fallu Sumbu, Military Attaché of Zaïre in Washington, Colonel Mudiayi wa Mudiayi, the military attaché of Zaïre in Paris, the military attache in Brussels, a paracommando battalion commander, and several others. The regime alleged these officers and others (including Mobutu's secrétaire particulier) had plotted the assassination of Mobutu, high treason, and disclosure of military secrets, among other offences. The alleged coup was investigated by a revolutionary commission headed by Boyenge Mosambay Singa, at that time head of the Gendarmerie. Writing in 1988, Michael Schatzberg said the full details of the coup had yet to emerge. Meitho, writing many years later, says the officers were accused of trying to raise Mobutu's secrétaire particulier, Colonel Omba Pene Djunga, from Kasai, to power.

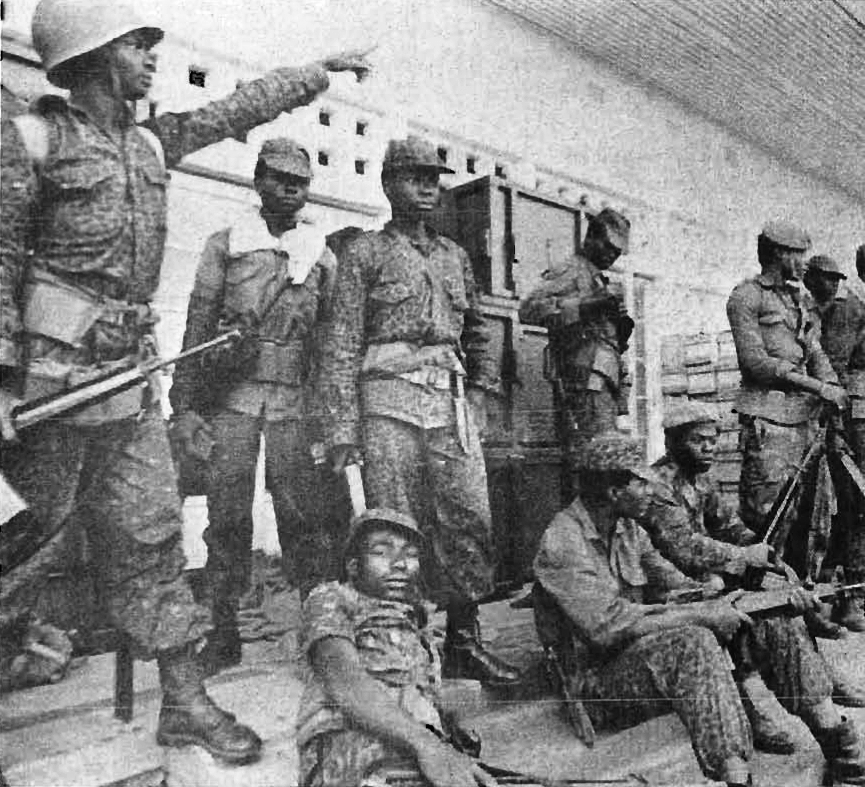
Zairian troops in Southern Shaba, April 1977

In late 1975, Mobutu, in a bid to install a pro-Kinshasa government in Angola and thwart the Marxist Popular Movement for the Liberation of Angola (MPLA)'s drive for power, deployed FAZ armoured cars, paratroopers, and three infantry battalions to Angola in support of the National Liberation Front of Angola (FNLA). On 10 November 1975, an anti-Communist force made up of 1,500 FNLA fighters, 100 Portuguese Angolan soldiers, and two FAZ battalions passed near the city of Quifangondo, only 30 kilometres (19 mi) north of Luanda, at dawn on 10 November. The force, supported by South African aircraft and three 140 mm artillery pieces, marched in a single line along the Bengo River to face an 800-strong Cuban force across the river. Thus the Battle of Quifangondo began. The Cubans and MPLA fighters bombarded the FNLA with mortar and 122 mm rockets, destroying most of the FNLA's armoured cars and six Jeeps carrying antitank rockets in the first hour of fighting.

Mobutu's support for the FNLA policy backfired when the MPLA won in Angola. The MPLA, then, acting ostensibly at least as the Front for Congolese National Liberation, occupied Zaire's southeastern Katanga Province, then known as Shaba, in March 1977, facing little resistance from the FAZ. This invasion is sometimes known as Shaba I. Mobutu had to request assistance, which was provided by Morocco in the form of regular troops who routed the MPLA and their Cuban advisors out of Katanga. Also important were Egyptian pilots who flew Zaire's Mirage 5 combat aircraft. The humiliation of this episode led to civil unrest in Zaire in early 1978, which the FAZ had to put down.

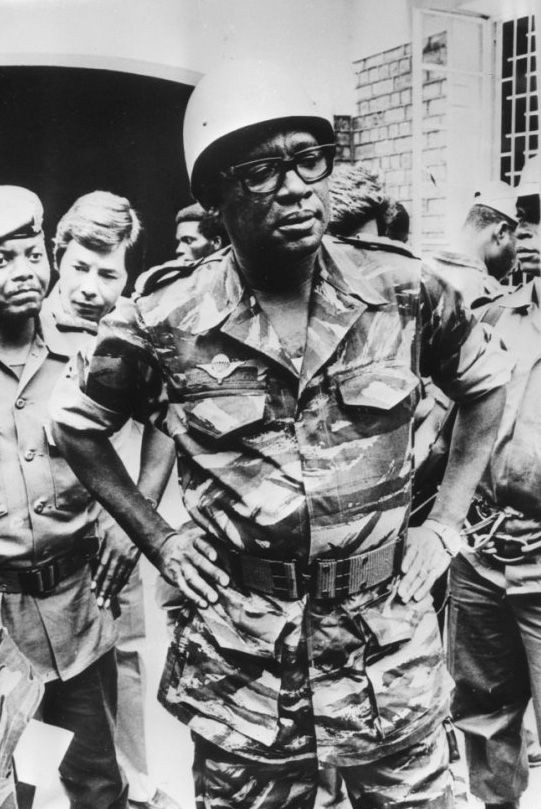
President Mobutu in military fatigues, 1978

The poor performance of Zaire's military during Shaba I gave evidence of chronic weaknesses. One problem was that some of the Zairian soldiers in the area had not received pay for extended periods. Senior officers often kept the money intended for the soldiers, typifying a generally disreputable and inept senior leadership in the FAZ. As a result, many soldiers simply deserted rather than fight. Others stayed with their units but were ineffective. During the months following the Shaba invasion, Mobutu sought solutions to the military problems that had contributed to the army's dismal performance. He implemented sweeping reforms of the command structure, including wholesale firings of high-ranking officers. He merged the military general staff with his own presidential staff and appointed himself chief of staff again, in addition to the positions of minister of defence and supreme commander that he already held. He also redeployed his forces throughout the country instead of keeping them close to Kinshasa, as had previously been the case. The Kamanyola Division, at the time considered the army's best formation, and considered the president's own, was assigned permanently to Shaba. In addition to these changes, the army's strength was reduced by 25 percent. Also, Zaire's allies provided a large influx of military equipment, and Belgian, French, and American advisers assisted in rebuilding and retraining the force.

Despite these improvements, a second invasion by the former Katangan gendarmerie, known as Shaba II in May–June 1978, was only dispersed with the dispatch of the French 2nd Foreign Parachute Regiment and a battalion of the Belgian Paracommando Regiment. Kamanyola Division units collapsed almost immediately. French units fought the Battle of Kolwezi to recapture the town from the FLNC. The U.S. provided extensive airlift and logistical assistance.

In July 1975, according to the IISS Military Balance, the FAZ included 14 infantry battalions, seven "Guard" battalions, and seven other infantry battalions variously designated as "parachute" (or possibly "commando"; probably the units of the parachute brigade originally formed in 1968). There were also an armoured car regiment and a mechanised infantry battalion. Organisationally, the army was made up of the parachute division and the seven groupements. In addition to these units, a tank battalion was reported to have formed by 1979.

In January 1979 General de Division Mosambaye Singa Boyenge was named as both military region commander and Region Commissioner for Shaba.

In 1984, a militarised police force, the Civil Guard, was formed. It was eventually commanded by Général d'armée Kpama Baramoto Kata.

Thomas Turner wrote in the mid-1990s that "[m]ajor acts of violence, such as the killings that followed the "Kasongo uprising" in Bandundu Region in 1978, the killings of diamond miners in Kasai-Oriental Region in 1979, and, more recently, the massacre of students in Lubumbashi in 1990, continued to intimidate the population."

Ground Forces Order of Battle, 1988
Formation	Location	Size	Notes
Special Presidential Division	Kinshasa	5,200	Five battalions, 'appears combat ready'
Kamanyola Division	Shaba	4,100	14th Bde only combat ready formation
31st Parachute Brigade	Kinshasa/Kamina	3,800	See State Dept 1978KINSHA06951 (1978). 'High state of combat readiness'
32nd Parachute Brigade	Kinshasa	1,000	Still forming, to be deployed to Kitona. Separate 2008 French source says the brigade was never fully established.
1st Armoured Brigade	Mbanza-Ngungu	1,300	Only 30 of apx 100 tanks operational
41st Commando Brigade	Kisangani	1,200	Three battalions deployed along Eastern borders
13th Infantry Brigade	Kalemie	1,500	'One of the most neglected units in the Zairean ground forces.'
21st Infantry Brigade	Around Lubumbashi	1,700	See State Dept 1979LUBUMB01982 (1979). 'Modest combat capability'
22nd Light Infantry Brigade	Kamina base	2,500	'Role undefined'

The authors of the Library of Congress Country Study on Zaire commented in 1992–93 that:

"The maintenance status of equipment in the inventory has traditionally varied, depending on a unit's priority and the presence or absence of foreign advisers and technicians. A considerable portion of military equipment is not operational, primarily as a result of shortages of spare parts, poor maintenance, and theft. For example, the tanks of the 1st Armoured Brigade often have a nonoperational rate approaching 70 to 80 percent. After a visit by a Chinese technical team in 1985, most of the tanks operated, but such an improved status generally has not lasted long beyond the departure of the visiting team. Several factors complicate maintenance in Zairian units. Maintenance personnel often lack the training necessary to maintain modern military equipment. Moreover, the wide variety of military equipment and the staggering array of spare parts necessary to maintain it not only clog the logistic network but also are expensive.

The most important factor that negatively affects maintenance is the low and irregular pay that soldiers receive, resulting in the theft and sale of spare parts and even basic equipment to supplement their meager salaries. When not stealing spare parts and equipment, maintenance personnel often spend the better part of their duty day looking for other ways to profit. American maintenance teams working in Zaire found that providing a free lunch to the work force was a good, sometimes the only, technique to motivate personnel to work at least half of the duty day.

The army's logistics corps [was tasked].. to provide logistic support and conduct direct, indirect, and depot-level maintenance for the FAZ. But because of Zaire's lack of emphasis on maintenance and logistics, a lack of funding, and inadequate training, the corps is understaffed, underequipped, and generally unable to accomplish its mission. It is organised into three battalions assigned to Mbandaka, Kisangani, and Kamina, but only the battalion at Kamina is adequately staffed; the others are little more than skeleton" units.

The poor state of discipline of the Congolese forces became apparent again in 1990. Foreign military assistance to Zaire ceased following the end of the Cold War and Mobutu deliberately allowed the military's condition to deteriorate so that it did not threaten his hold on power. Protesting low wages and lack of pay, paratroopers began looting Kinshasa in September 1991 and were only stopped after intervention by French ('Operation Baumier') and Belgian ('Operation Blue Beam') forces.

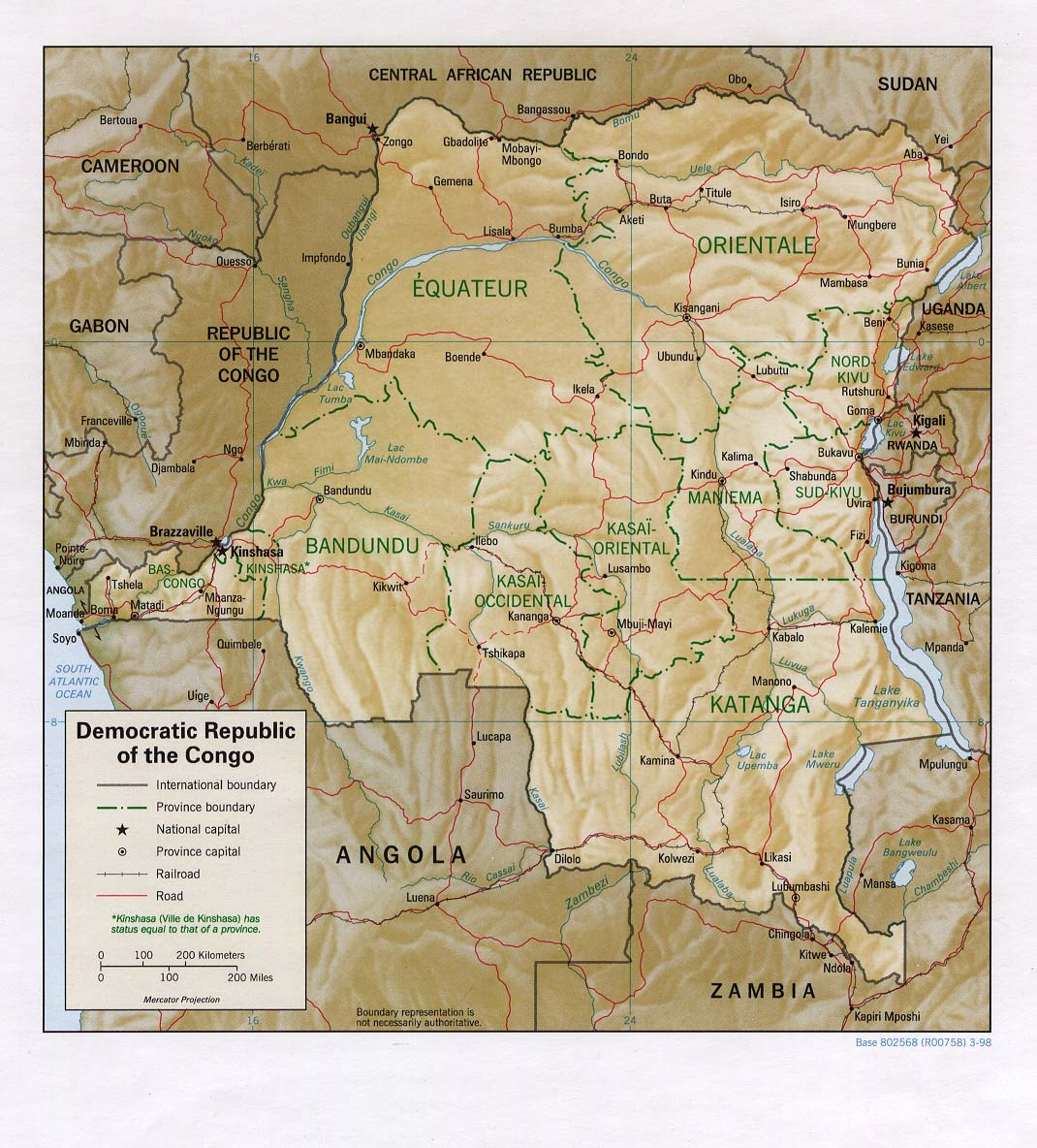
Map of the DR of Congo

In 1993, according to the Library of Congress Country Studies, the 25,000-member FAZ ground forces consisted of one infantry division (with three infantry brigades); one airborne brigade (with three parachute battalions and one support battalion); one special forces (commando/counterinsurgency) brigade; the Special Presidential Division; one independent armoured brigade; and two independent infantry brigades (each with three infantry battalions, one support battalion). These units were deployed throughout the country, with the main concentrations in Shaba Region (approximately half the force). The Kamanyola Division, consisting of three infantry brigades operated generally in western Shaba Region; the 21st Infantry Brigade was located in Lubumbashi; the 13th Infantry Brigade was deployed throughout eastern Shaba; and at least one battalion of the 31st Airborne Brigade stayed at Kamina. The other main concentration of forces was in and around Kinshasa: the 31st Airborne Brigade was deployed at N'djili Airport on the outskirts of the capital; the Special Presidential Division (DSP) resided adjacent to the presidential compound; and the 1st Armoured Brigade was at Mbanza-Ngungu (in Bas-Congo, approximately 120 kilometres (75 mi) southwest of Kinshasa). Finally the 41st Commando Brigade was at Kisangani.

This superficially impressive list of units overstates the actual capability of the armed forces at the time. Apart from privileged formations such as the Presidential Division and the 31st Airborne Brigade, most units were poorly trained, divided and so badly paid that they regularly resorted to looting. What operational abilities the armed forces had were gradually destroyed by politicisation of the forces, tribalisation, and division of the forces, included purges of suspectedly disloyal groups, intended to allow Mobutu to divide and rule. All this occurred against the background of increasing deterioration of state structures under the kleptocratic Mobutu regime.

=== Mobutu's overthrow and after ===
Much of the origins of the recent conflict in what is now the Democratic Republic of the Congo stems from the turmoil following the Rwandan genocide of 1994, which then led to the Great Lakes refugee crisis. Within the largest refugee camps, beginning in Goma in Nord-Kivu, were Rwandan Hutu fighters, who were eventually organised into the Rassemblement Démocratique pour le Rwanda, who launched repeated attacks into Rwanda. Rwanda eventually backed Laurent-Désiré Kabila and his quickly-organised Alliance of Democratic Forces for the Liberation of Congo (AFDL) in invading Zaire, aiming to stop the attacks on Rwanda in the process of toppling Mobutu's government. When the militias rebelled, backed by Rwanda, the FAZ, weakened as is noted above, proved incapable of mastering the situation and preventing the overthrow of Mobutu in 1997.

The Battle of Kinsangani took place in March 1997 during this war. The AFDL rebels, created by the Rwandan Patriotic Front, took the city defended by the Zairian Armed Forces (FAZ), loyal to President Mobutu. Before the battle itself, the air force, Serbian mercenaries and Rwandan Hutu militiamen were not enough to make up for the FAZ's lack of fighting spirit. After the war, elements of the Mobutu-loyal FAZ managed to retreat into northern Congo, and from there into Sudan while attempting to escape the AFDL. Allying themselves with the Sudanese government which was fighting its own civil war at the time, these FAZ troops were destroyed by the Sudan People's Liberation Army during Operation Thunderbolt near Yei in March 1997.

When Kabila took power in 1997, the country was renamed the Democratic Republic of the Congo and so the name of the national army changed once again, to the Forces armées congolaises (FAC). Tanzania sent six hundred military advisors to train Kabila's new army in May 1997. Gérard Prunier wrote that the instructors were still at the Kitona base when the Second Congo War broke out, and had to be quickly returned to Tanzania. Prunier said "South African aircraft carried out the evacuation after a personal conversation between President Mkapa and not-yet-president Thabo Mbeki." Command over the armed forces in the first few months of Kabila's rule was vague. Prunier added that "there was no minister of defence, no known chief of staff, and no ranks; all officers were Cuban-style 'commanders' called 'Ignace', 'Bosco', Jonathan', or 'James', who occupied connecting suites at the Intercontinental Hotel and had presidential list cell-phone numbers. None spoke French or Lingala, but all spoke Kinyarwanda, Swahili, and, quite often, English." On being asked by Belgian journalist Colette Braeckman what was the actual army command structure apart from himself, Kabila answered 'We are not going to expose ourselves and risk being destroyed by showing ourselves openly...We are careful so that the true masters of the army are not known. It is strategic. Please, let us drop the matter.' Kabila's new Forces armées congolaises were riven with internal tensions. The new FAC had Banyamulenge fighters from South Kivu, kadogo child soldiers from various eastern tribes, such as Thierry Nindaga, Safari Rwekoze, etc... [the mostly] Lunda Katangese Tigers of the former FNLC, and former FAZ personnel. Mixing these disparate and formerly warring elements together led to mutiny. On 23 February 1998, a mostly Banyamulenge unit mutiniued at Bukavu after its officers tried to disperse the soldiers into different units spread all around the Congo. By mid-1998, formations on the outbreak of the Second Congo War included the Tanzanian-supported 50th Brigade, headquartered at Kokolo Military Camp, and the 10th Brigade – one of the best and largest units in the army – stationed in Goma, as well as the 12th Brigade in Bukavu. The declaration of the 10th Brigade's commander, former DSP officer Jean-Pierre Ondekane, on 2 August 1998 that he no longer recognised Kabila as the state's president was one of the factors in the beginning of the Second Congo War.

According to Jane's, the FAC performed poorly throughout the Second Congo War and "demonstrated little skill or recognisable military doctrine". At the outbreak of the war in 1998 the Army was ineffective and the DRC Government was forced to rely on assistance from Angola, Chad, Namibia and Zimbabwe. As well as providing expeditionary forces, these countries unsuccessfully attempted to retrain the DRC Army. North Korea and Tanzania also provided assistance with training. During the first year of the war the Allied forces defeated the Rwandan force which had landed in Bas-Congo and the rebel forces south-west of Kinshasa and eventually halted the rebel and Rwandan offensive in the east of the DRC. These successes contributed to the Lusaka Ceasefire Agreement which was signed in July 1999. Following the Lusaka Agreement, in mid-August 1999 President Kabila issued a decree dividing the country into eight military regions. The first military region, Congolese state television reported, would consist of the two Kivu provinces, Orientale Province would form the second region, and Maniema and Kasai-Oriental provinces the third. Katanga and Équateur would fall under the fourth and fifth regions, respectively, while Kasai-Occidental and Bandundu would form the sixth region. Kinshasa and Bas-Congo would form the seventh and eighth regions, respectively. In November 1999 the Government attempted to form a 20,000-strong paramilitary force designated the People's Defence Forces. This force was intended to support the FAC and national police but never became effective.

=== 1999–present ===
The Lusaka Ceasefire Agreement was not successful in ending the war, and fighting resumed in September 1999. The FAC's performance continued to be poor and both the major offensives the government launched in 2000 ended in costly defeats. President Kabila's mismanagement was an important factor behind the FAC's poor performance, with soldiers frequently going unpaid and unfed while the Government purchased advanced weaponry which could not be operated or maintained. The defeats in 2000 are believed to have been the cause of President Kabila's assassination in January 2001. Following the assassination, Joseph Kabila assumed the presidency and was eventually successful in negotiating an end to the war in 2002–2003.

The December 2002 Global and All-Inclusive Agreement devoted Chapter VI to the armed forces. It stipulated that the armed forces chief of staff, and the chiefs of the army, air force, and navy were not to come from the same warring faction. The new "national, restructured and integrated" army would be made up from Kabila's government forces (the FAC), the RCD, and the MLC. Also stipulated in VI(b) was that the RCD-N, RCD-ML, and the Mai-Mai would become part of the new armed forces. An intermediate mechanism for physical identification of the soldiers, and their origin, date of enrolment, and unit was also called for (VI(c)). It also provided for the creation of a Conseil Superieur de la Defense (Superior Defence Council) which would declare states of siege or war and give advice on security sector reform, disarmament/demobilization, and national defence policy.

A decision on which factions were to name chiefs of staff and military regional commanders was announced on 19 August 2003 as the first move in military reform, superimposed on top of the various groups of fighters, government and former rebels. Negotiations had been ongoing since June 2003. Kabila was able to name the armed forces chief of staff, Lieutenant General Liwanga Mata, who previously served as navy chief of staff under Laurent Kabila. Kabila was able to name the air force commander (John Numbi), the RCD-Goma received the Land Force commander's position (Sylvain Buki) and the MLC the navy (Dieudonne Amuli Bahigwa). Three military regional commanders were nominated by the former Kinshasa government, two commanders each by the RCD-Goma and the MLC, and one region commander each by the RCD-K/ML and RCD-N. However these appointments were announced for Kabila's Forces armées congolaises (FAC), not the later FARDC. However, troop deployment on the ground did not change substantially until the year afterward.

Congolese troops raise the flag of the Democratic Republic of the Congo in 2010

On 24 January 2004, a decree created the Structure Militaire d'Intégration (SMI, Military Integration Structure). Together with the SMI, CONADER also was designated to manage the combined tronc commun DDR element and military reform programme. The first post-Sun City military law appears to have been passed on 12 November 2004, which formally created the new national Forces Armées de la République Démocratique du Congo (FARDC). Included in this law was article 45, which recognised the incorporation of a number of armed groups into the FARDC, including the former government army Forces Armées Congolaises (FAC), ex-FAZ personnel also known as former President Mobutu's 'les tigres', the RCD-Goma, RCD-ML, RCD-N, MLC, the Mai-Mai, as well as other government-determined military and paramilitary groups.

Turner writes that the two most prominent opponents of military integration (brassage) were Colonel Jules Mutebutsi, a Munyamulenge from South Kivu, and Laurent Nkunda, a Rwandaphone Tutsi who Turner says was allegedly from Rutshuru in North Kivu. In May–June 2004 Mutebusi led a revolt against his superiors from Kinshasa in South Kivu. Nkunda began his long series of revolts against central authority by helping Mutebusi in May–June 2004. In November 2004 a Rwandan government force entered North Kivu to attack the FDLR, and, it seems, reinforced and resupplied RCD-Goma (ANC) at the same time. Mutebutsi and Nkunda were seemingly supported by both the Rwandan government, the FARDC regional commander, General Obed Rwisbasira, and the RCD-Goma governor of North Kivu, Eugene Serufuli. Neither government figure did anything to prevent Nkunda's march south to Bukavu with his military force. In mid-December, civilians at Kanyabayonga, Buramba, and Nyabiondo in North Kivu were killed, tortured, and raped, seemingly deliberately targeted on ethic grounds (the victims came almost exclusively from the Hunde and Nande ethnic groups). Kabila dispatched 10,000 government troops to the east in response, launching an operation 11 December that was called "Operation Bima". Its only major success was the capture of Walikale from RCD-Goma (ANC) troops.

There was another major personnel reshuffle on 12 June 2007. FARDC chief General Kisempia Sungilanga Lombe was replaced with General Dieudonne Kayembe Mbandankulu. General Gabriel Amisi Kumba retained his post as Land Forces commander. John Numbi, a trusted member of Kabila's inner circle, was shifted from air force commander to Police Inspector General. U.S. diplomats reported that the former Naval Forces Commander Maj. General Amuli Bahigua (ex-MLC) became the FARDC's Chief of Operations; former FARDC Intelligence Chief General Didier Etumba (ex-FAC) was promoted to vice admiral and appointed Commander of Naval Forces; Maj. General Rigobert Massamba (ex-FAC), a former commander of the Kitona air base, was appointed as Air Forces Commander; and Brig. General Jean-Claude Kifwa, commander of the Republican Guard, was appointed as a regional military commander.

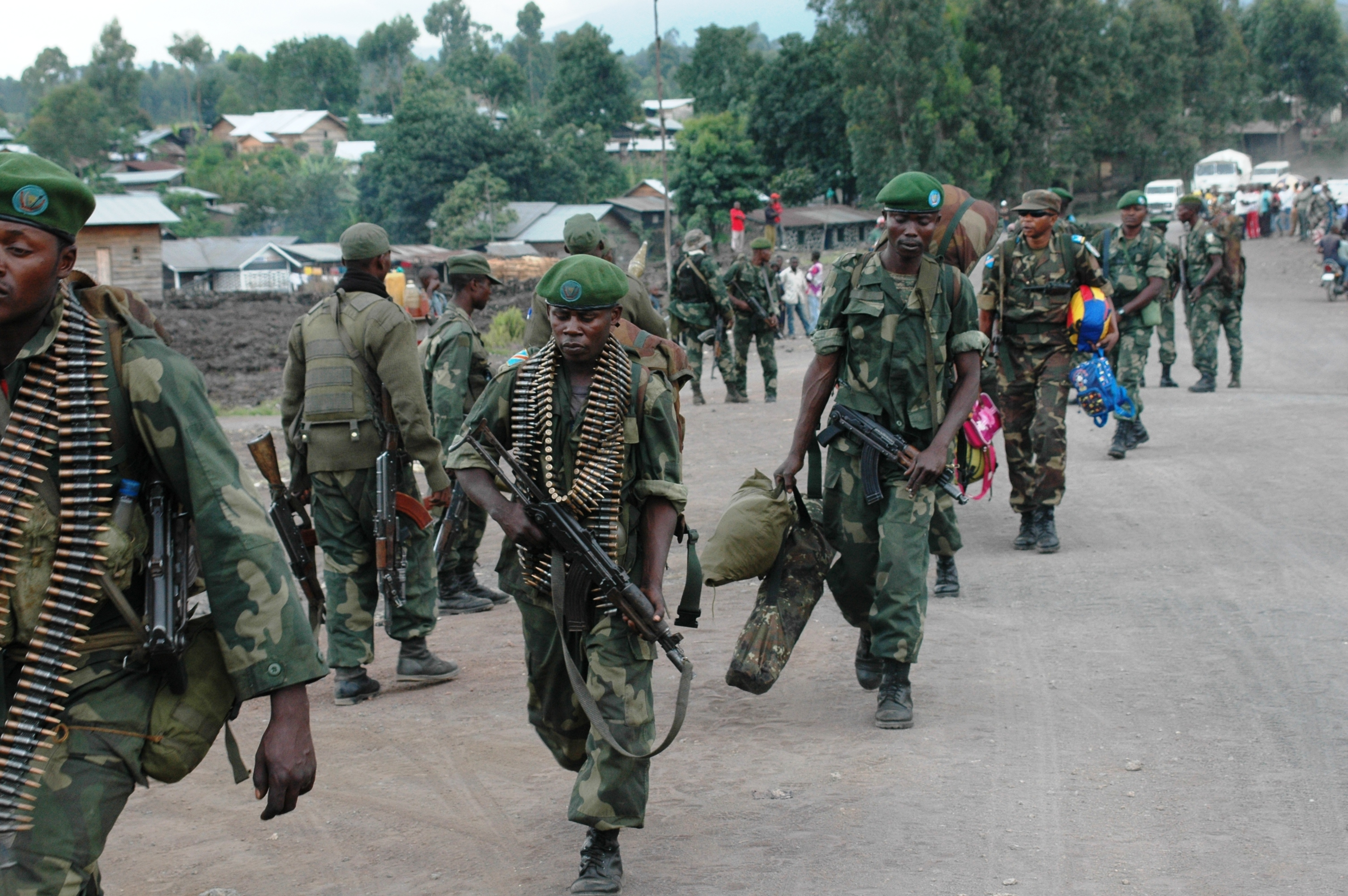
FARDC soldiers near Goma in May 2013

Due to significant delays in the DDR and integration process, of the eighteen brigades, only seventeen have been declared operational, over two and a half years after the initial target date. Responding to the situation, the Congolese Minister of Defence presented a new defence reform master plan to the international community in February 2008. Essentially the three force tiers all had their readiness dates pushed back: the first, territorial forces, to 2008–12, the mobile force to 2008–10, and the main defence force to 2015.

Much of the east of the country remains insecure, however. In the far northeast this is due primarily to the Ituri conflict. In the area around Lake Kivu, primarily in North Kivu, fighting continues among the Democratic Forces for the Liberation of Rwanda and between the government FARDC and Laurent Nkunda's troops, with all groups greatly exacerbating the issues of internal refugees in the area of Goma, the consequent food shortages, and loss of infrastructure from the years of conflict. In 2009, several United Nations officials stated that the army is a major problem, largely due to corruption that results in food and pay meant for soldiers being diverted and a military structure top-heavy with colonels, many of whom are former warlords. In a 2009 report itemizing FARDC abuses, Human Rights Watch urged the UN to stop supporting government offensives against eastern rebels until the abuses ceased.

Caty Clement wrote in 2009:

"One of the most notable [FARDC corruption] schemes was known as 'Opération Retour' (Operation Return). Senior officers ordered the soldiers' pay to be sent from Kinshasa to the commanders in the field, who took their cut and returned the remainder to their commander in Kinshasa instead of paying the soldiers. To ensure that foot soldiers would be paid their due, in late 2005, EUSEC suggested separating the chain of command from the chain of payment. The former remained within Congolese hands, while the EU mission delivered salaries directly to the newly 'integrated' brigades. Although efficient in the short term, this solution raises the question of sustainability and ownership in the long term. Once soldiers' pay could no longer be siphoned off via 'Opération Retour', however, two other budgetary lines, the 'fonds de ménage' and logistical support to the brigades, were soon diverted."

In 2010, thirty FARDC officers were given scholarships to study in Russian military academies. This is part of a greater effort by Russia to help improve the FARDC. A new military attaché and other advisers from Russia visited the DRC.

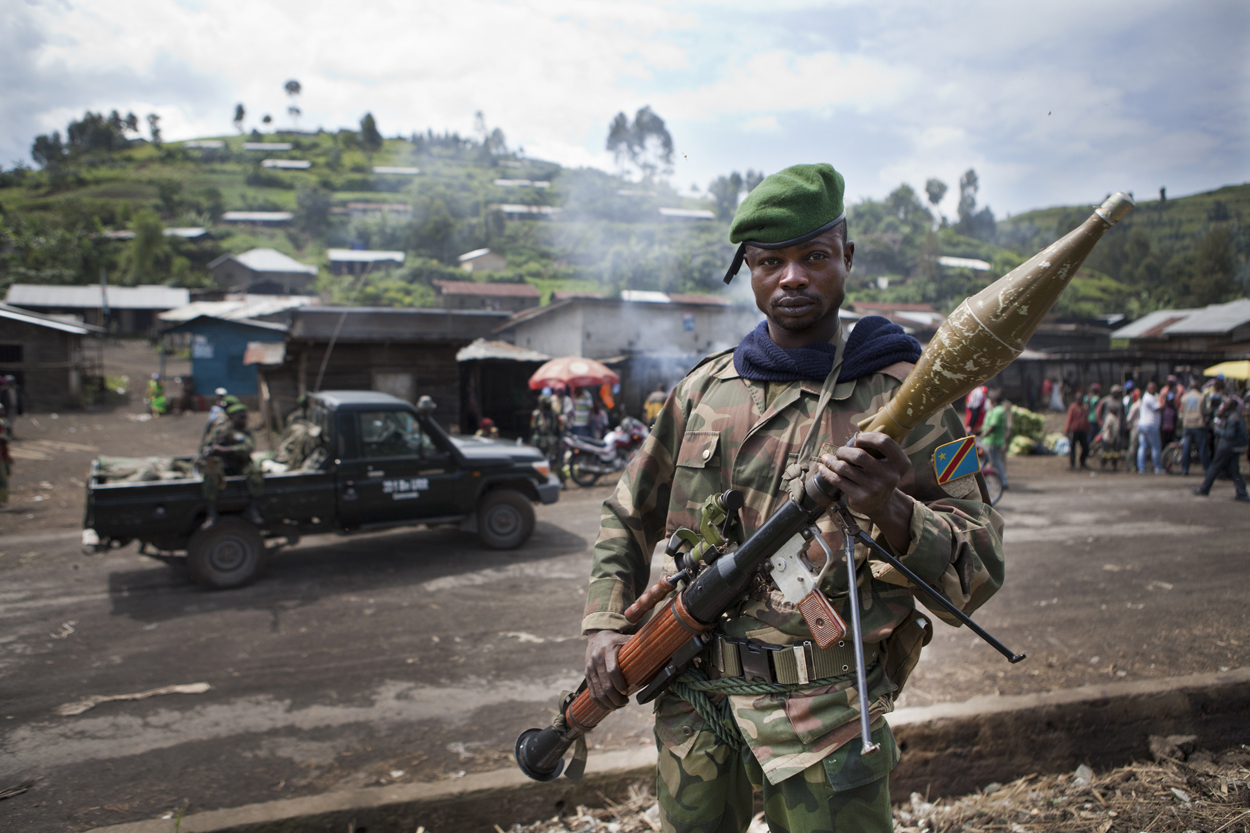
A FARDC soldier deployed in Kibumba, Bukumu Chiefdom, the last position before entering M23-controlled territory in September 2012

On 22 November 2012, Gabriel Amisi Kumba was suspended from his position in the Forces Terrestres by president Joseph Kabila due to an inquiry into his alleged role in the sale of arms to various rebel groups in the eastern part of the country, which may have implicated the rebel group M23. In December 2012 it was reported that members of Army units in the north east of the country are often not paid due to corruption, and these units rarely counter attacks made against villages by the Lord's Resistance Army.

The FARDC deployed 850 soldiers and 150 PNC police officers as part of an international force in the Central African Republic, which the DRC borders to the north. The country had been in a state of civil war since 2012, when the president was ousted by rebel groups. The DRC was urged by French president François Hollande to keep its troops in CAR.

In July 2014, the Congolese army carried out a joint operation with UN troops in the Masisi and Walikale territories of the North Kivu province. In the process, they liberated over 20 villages and a mine from the control of two rebel groups, the Mai Mai Cheka and the Alliance for the Sovereign and Patriotic Congo.

The UN published a report in October 2017 announcing that the FARDC no longer employed child soldiers but was still listed under militaries that committed sexual violations against children.

Troops operating with MONUSCO in North Kivu were attacked by likely rebels from the Allied Democratic Forces on 8 December 2017. After a protracted firefight the troops suffered 5 dead along with 14 dead among the UN force.

On 10 July 2024, a military court in North Kivu sentenced 25 soldiers to death for charges including theft, fleeing the enemy, and violating orders after a one-day trial. These soldiers were accused of abandoning their posts during fights against the Rwanda-backed M23 rebels. Additionally, one soldier received a 10-year prison sentence for robbery, while four civilian wives and another soldier were acquitted.

== Structure ==
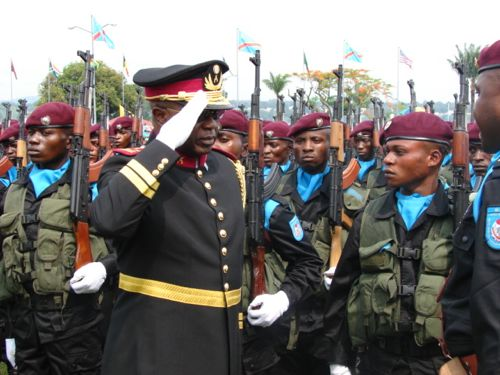
Gén. Kisempia Sungilanga, former Chief of Staff of the FARDC, in December 2006.

The FARDC are headed by a Supreme Council of Defence, which is chaired by the president of the republic. The Council coordinates all actions related to security and defence. It is the body that decides on all troop movements, both of the army and of the Congolese National Police.

=== Supreme council of defence ===
Overall leadership of the FARDC is vested in the president of the republic, who serves as Supreme Commander of the Armed Forces and presides over the Supreme Council of Defence. The president may declare war through an ordinance adopted by the council of ministers, following consultation with the Supreme Council of Defence and approval by both the National Assembly and the Senate.

Article 192 of the Constitution of 18 February 2006 formally establishes the Supreme Council of Defence. It is chaired by the president, or by the Prime Minister of the Democratic Republic of the Congo in cases of absence or incapacity. The council's responsibilities include defining broad policy orientations for defence-related negotiations, coordinating defence activities across relevant ministries and institutions, determining the allocation of human, financial, and material resources for defence, and adopting measures necessary to meet the operational needs of the Armed Forces. In times of war, a Special Defence Committee is created to assist the president in directing military operations.

The President Félix Tshisekedi is the Commander-in-Chief of the Armed Forces. The Minister of Defence, formally Ministers of Defence and Veterans (Ancien Combattants) is Crispin Atama Tabe, who succeeded former minister Aimé Ngoy Mukena.

=== Joint Chiefs of Staff, command of the forces, and military region ===
The FARDC consists of land, air, and naval forces, a central logistics base, specialized services, the military justice system, and higher military education institutions. These components are placed under the authority of a general officer holding the position of Chief of the Joint General Staff. This officer exercises command over all forces, military regions, specialized services, and the central logistics base, assisted by a Chief of Staff of Headquarters and three Deputy Chiefs of Staff.

Each branch of the armed forces is commanded by a general officer designated as Force Commander, supported by a Chief of Staff and three Deputy Chiefs of Staff. These officers manage their respective forces under the authority of the Chief of the Joint General Staff. There are also specialized units managed by senior officers or generals. The commanders of these units operate under the authority of the Chief of the Joint General Staff. This is notably the case for the Central Logistics Base, which is managed by its commander; the Republican Guard, with its various detachments across several provinces and districts, which is managed by a Commander of the Republican Guard; and the higher military schools, which are managed by a Commander of the grouping of higher military schools. The Military Justice Corps is tasked with prosecuting offenses committed by members of the armed forces and the Congolese National Police, in accordance with Article 1 of the Decree-Law of 24 November 1964 on the organization of the repressive action of military courts when they replace ordinary courts and tribunals. When, following the proclamation of a state of emergency, the repressive action of military courts replaces, in all or part of the territories concerned, that of ordinary courts and tribunals in accordance with Article 124 of the Constitution, the jurisdiction and powers of the military courts are defined by this decree-law. The Military Judicial Code governs the organization and functioning of military courts, whose jurisdiction extends nationwide to military offenses under the Military Penal Code as well as ordinary crimes committed by military personnel. Individuals become subject to military law from the moment an authorized official formally declares them under its authority after informing them of applicable military regulations.

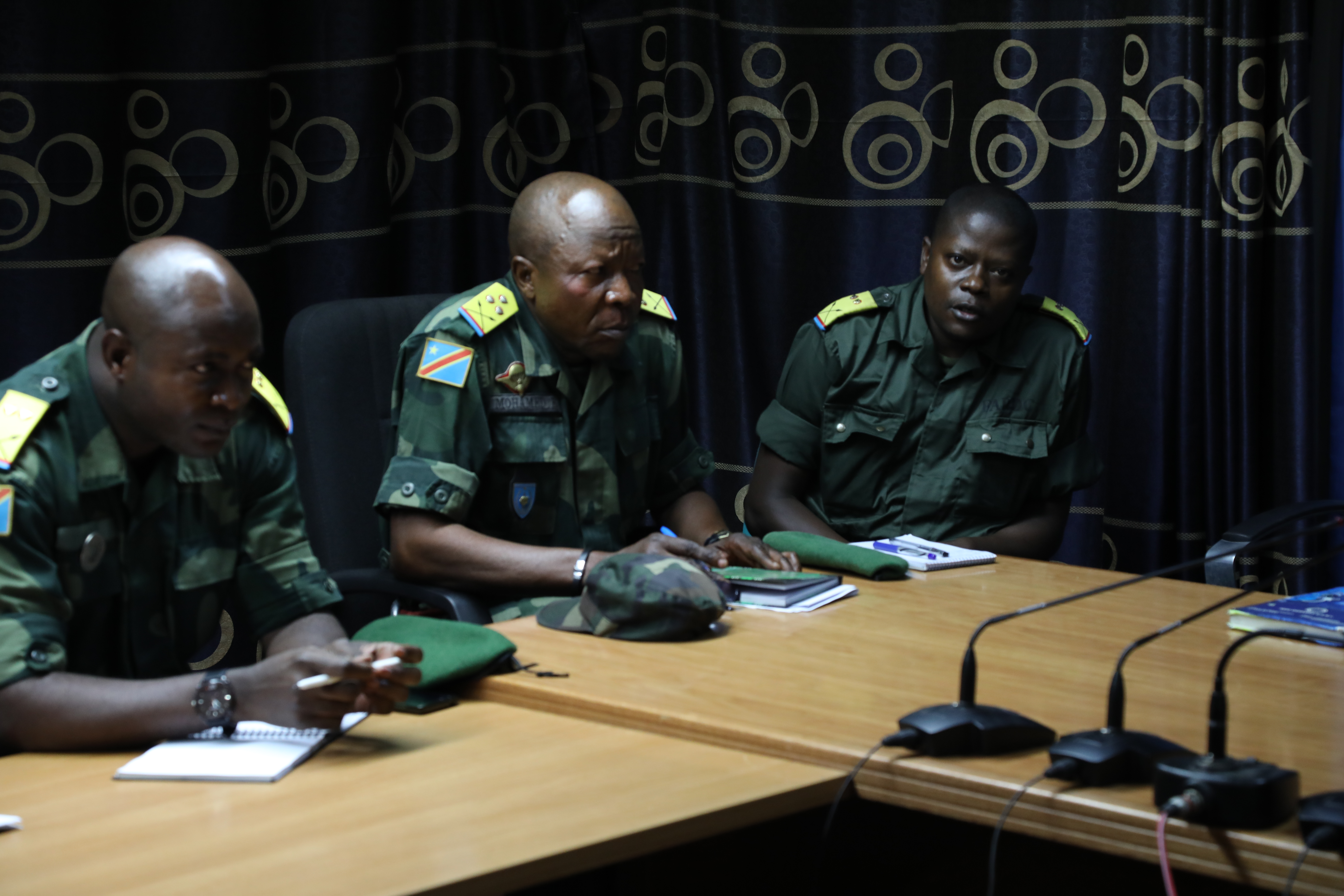
Brig. Gen. Ychaligonza Nduru, FARDC commander of Operation Sukola II, at MONUSCO headquarters in Goma

Congolese soldiers assigned to the Congolese Light Infantry Battalion wait for details of a training scenario at Camp Base in Kisangani

A military region encompasses all land, air, and naval force units, as well as the regional logistics base and specialized services stationed within a defined area. It is composed of one or more joint operational command levels tasked with coordinating territorial activities. The geographical limits of a military region may align with the boundaries of one or several administrative provinces. The commander of a military region is appointed and dismissed by the President of the Republic and reports directly to the Chief of the Joint General Staff. Each military region is divided into brigades, which exercise command over battalions, themselves organized into companies. Brigades are led by senior officers or generals holding the title of Brigade Commander, who are accountable to the Commander of the Land Force for the management and effectiveness of their units. In addition, specialized units are deployed throughout the national territory. The Land Forces are distributed around ten military regions, up from the previous eight, following the ten provinces of the country.

==== Command structure in January 2005 ====
Virtually all officers have now changed positions, but this list gives an outline of the structure in January 2005. Despite the planned subdivision of the country into more numerous provinces, the actual splitting of the former provinces has not taken place.

- FARDC chief of staff: Major General Sungilanga Kisempia (PPRD)
- FARDC land forces chief of staff: General Sylvain Buki (RCD-G). Major General Gabriel Amisi Kumba appears to have been appointed to the position in August 2006, and retained this position during the personnel reshuffle of 12 June 2007. In November 2012 he was succeeded by François Olenga.
- FARDC navy chief of staff: General Major Dieudonne Amuli Bahigwa (MLC) (Commander of the Kimia II operation in 2009)
- FARDC air force chief of staff: Brigadier General Jean Bitanihirwa Kamara (MLC). Military training at the Ecole de formation d'officiers (EFO), Kananga, and other courses while in the FAZ. Brigade commander in the MLC, then named in August 2003 "chef d'etat-major en second" of the FARDC air force.
- 1st Military Region/Bandundu: Brigadier General Moustapha Mukiza (MLC)
- 2nd Military Region/Bas-Congo: Unknown. General Jean Mankoma 2009.
- 3rd Military Region/Equateur: Brigadier-General Mulubi Bin Muhemedi (PPRD)
- 4th Military Region/Kasai-Occidental: Brigadier-General Sindani Kasereka (RCD-K/ML)
- 5th Military Region/Kasai Oriental: General Rwabisira Obeid (RCD)
- 6th Military Region/Katanga: Brigadier-General Nzambe Alengbia (MLC) – 62nd, 63rd, and 67th Brigades in Katanga have committed numerous acts of sexual violence against women.
- 7th Military Region/Maniema: Brigadier-General Widi Mbulu Divioka (RCD-N)
- 8th Military Region/North Kivu: General Gabriel Amisi Kumba (RCD). General Amisi, a.k.a. "Tango Fort" now appears to be Chief of Staff of the Land Forces. Brig. Gen. Vainqueur Mayala was Commander 8th MR in September 2008
- 9th Military Region/Province Orientale: Major-General Bulenda Padiri (Mayi–Mayi)
- 10th Military Region/South Kivu: Major Mbuja Mabe (PPRD). General Pacifique Masunzu, in 2010. Region included 112th Brigade on Minembwe plateuxes. This grouping was "an almost exclusively Banyamulenge brigade under the direct command of the 10th Military Region, [which] consider[ed] General Masunzu as its leader."

==== Updates to command structure in 2014 ====
In September 2014, President Kabila reshuffled the command structure and in addition to military regions created three new 'defence zones' which would be subordinated directly to the general staff. The defence zones essentially created a new layer between the general staff and the provincial commanders. The military regions themselves were reorganised and do not correspond with the ones that existed prior to the reshuffle. New commanders of branches were also appointed: A Congolese military analyst based in Brussels, Jean-Jacques Wondo, provided an outline of the updated command structure of the FARDC following the shake up of the high command:

- Chief of General Staff: Army Gen. Didier Etumba
- Deputy chief of staff for operations and intelligence: Lt. Gen. Bayiba Dieudonné Amuli
- Deputy chief of staff for administration and logistics: Maj. Gen. Celestin Mbala Munsense
- Chief of operations: Maj. Gen. Prosper Nabiola
- Chief of intelligence: Brig. Gen. Tage Tage
- Chief of administration: Constantin Claude Ilunga Kabangu
- Chief of logistics: Brig. Gen. Lutuna Charles Shabani
- Land Forces Chief of Staff: Gen. Dieudonné Banze
- Land Forces deputy chief of staff for operations and intelligence: Maj. Gen. Kiama Vainqueur Mayala
- Land Forces deputy chief of staff for administration and logistics: Maj. Gen. Muyumb Obed Wibatira
- Navy Chief of Staff: Vice Adm. Rombault Mbuayama
- Navy deputy chief of staff for operations and intelligence: Rear Adm. Jean-Marie Valentin Linguma Mata Linguma (Vice Adm. from 2018)
- Navy deputy chief of staff for administration and logistics: Rear Adm. Bruno Mayanga Muena
- Air Force Chief of Staff: Brig. Gen. Numbi Ngoie (Maj. Gen. from 2018)
- Air Force deputy chief of staff for operations and intelligence: Brig. Gen. Maurice René Diasuka Diakiyana (Maj. Gen. from 2018)
- Air Force deputy chief of staff for administration and logistics: Brig. Gen. Jean-Paul Nganguele Mutali (Maj. Gen. from 2018)

Regional commanders:

- 1st Defence Zone (Bas Congo, Bandundu, Equatuer, and Kinshasa): Brig. Gen. Gabriel Amisi Kumba
  - 11th Military Region (Bandundu Province): Brig Gen. Dieudonné Kiamata Mutupeke
  - 12th Military Region (Bas-Congo Province): Brig Gen. Jonas Padiri Muhizi (Maj. Gen. from 2018)
  - 13th Military Region (Equatuer Province): Brig. Gen. Luboya Kashama Johnny (Maj. Gen. from 2018)
  - 14th Military Region (Kinshasa): Brig. Gen. Camille Bombele Luwala
- 2nd Defence Zone (Kasai and Katanga): Maj. Gen. Jean Claude Kifwa
  - 21st Military Region (Kasai-Oriental and Kasai Occidental Provinces): Brig. Gen. Fall Jikabwe
  - 22nd Military Region (Katanga Province): Brig. Gen. Philémon Yav (Maj. Gen. from 2018)
- 3rd Defence Zone (Kivu, Maneima, and Katanga): Maj. Gen. Leon Mush ale Tsipamba
  - 31st Military Region (Bas-Uele and Tshopo Districts): Brig. Gen. Bertin Baseka Kamangala
  - 32nd Military Region (Haut-Uele and Ituri Districts): Brig. Gen. Jean-Pierre Bongwangela
  - 33rd Military Region (Maneima and South Kivu Provinces): Brig. Gen. Gaetan Kakudji Bobo
  - 34th Military Region (North Kivu Province): Maj. Gen. Emmanuel Lombe

==== Reshuffle in 2018 ====
The following changes were announced in July 2018.

- Chief of the General Staff: Lt. Gen. Celestin Mbala Munsense (Army Gen. from 2019)
- Deputy Chief of Staff for operations and intelligence: Lt. Gen. Gabriel Amisi Kumba
- Deputy Chief of Staff for administration and logistics: Maj. Gen. Jean-Pierre Bongwangela
- Chief of operations: Maj. Gen. Daniel Kashale
- Chief of intelligence: Maj. Gen. Delphin Kahimbi Kasabwe
- Chief of administration: Maj. Gen. Jean-Luc Yav
- Chief of logistics: Brig. Gen. Kalala Kilumba

=== Ranks ===
Pursuant to Decree-Law No. 226 of 7 May 1999 regulating the wearing of ranks and insignia within the Congolese Armed Forces (Forces armées congolaises; FAC), military ranks are organized into three principal groupings. The extra-category (extra-catégorie) is reserved for senior officials occupying the highest levels of military authority. This status is automatically conferred upon the Supreme Commander and other high-ranking officials designated by him, who wear insignia distinct from that of the Supreme Commander. The category (catégorie) encompasses commissioned officers, non-commissioned officers, and enlisted personnel. The order (ordre) applies specifically to soldiers.

Rank group	Description
General officers	The first category (première catégorie) corresponds to the rank of Lieutenant General, indicated by three stars and two gold bars on a red shoulder board.; The second category (deuxième catégorie) is equivalent to Major General and is identified by two stars and two gold bars on a red background.; The third category (troisième catégorie) corresponds to Brigadier General, denoted by one star and two gold bars on a red shoulder board.
Senior officers	The fourth category (quatrième catégorie) corresponds to the rank of Colonel and is marked by three stars and one horizontal gold bar on a black background.; The fifth category (cinquième catégorie) is equivalent to Lieutenant Colonel, identified by two stars and one horizontal gold bar on a black shoulder board.; The sixth category (sixième catégorie) corresponds to Major and is represented by one star and one horizontal gold bar on a black background.
Junior officers	The seventh category (septième catégorie) is equivalent to Captain and is indicated by three gold stars on a green shoulder board.; The eighth category (huitième catégorie) corresponds to Lieutenant and is marked by two gold stars on a green background.; The ninth category (neuvième catégorie) equates to Second Lieutenant and is represented by one gold star on a green shoulder board.
Non-commissioned officers and enlisted ranks	The tenth category (dixième catégorie) corresponds to Chief Warrant Officer and is denoted by one star positioned between two silver bars on a blue shoulder board.; The eleventh category (onzième catégorie) equates to First Class Warrant Officer, marked by one star and one horizontal silver bar on a blue background.; The twelfth category (douzième catégorie) corresponds to Second Class Warrant Officer and is indicated by a single silver star on a blue shoulder board.
Orders	The first order corresponds to Corporal.; The second order is equivalent to Private First Class, and the third order corresponds to Private.

==== 2010 reform of uniforms and insignia ====
The aforementioned Decree-Law establishing ranks in the Democratic Republic of the Congo creates some practical confusion, particularly regarding the category of warrant officers and soldiers. As a result, another legal act was pending to regularize the wearing of ranks.

As of 30 June 2010, the FARDC adopted new uniforms and rank insignia applicable throughout the national territory. Rank distinctions are displayed on shoulder boards whose colors identify rank categories: red for general officers, with stars indicating rank: one for Brigadier General, two for Major General, three for Lieutenant General, and four for General of the Army.

Senior officers wear yellow shoulder boards bearing a leopard's head, with one emblem for Major, two for Lieutenant Colonel, and three for Colonel. Junior officers wear blue shoulder boards with chevrons: one for Second Lieutenant, two for First Lieutenant, and three for Captain. First-class non-commissioned officers are distinguished by green shoulder boards.

=== Arms and Inter-forces services ===
- Signals
- Engineering
- Health Service
- Physical Education and Sports
- Military Chaplains
- Military Justice
- Administration
- Logistics
- Intelligence and Security
- Military Band
- Veterinary and Agricultural Service
- Military Police
- Civic, Patriotic Education and Social Actions
- Communication and Information

==== General Secretariat for Defence and Veterans Affairs ====
The General Secretariat for Defence: is headed by a General Officer (Secretary General for Defence). He oversees the following departments:

- Human Resources Department
- Directorate of Studies, Planning and Military Cooperation
- Budget and Finance Department
- Directorate of Penitentiary Administration
- Directorate of General Services
- IT Department

==== General Inspectorate ====
The General Inspectorate includes the following people:

- Inspector General
- Two Assistant Inspectors General
- College of Inspectors
- College of Advisers
- Administrative Secretariat
- Administrative, logistics and services unit

=== Joint General Staff ===
Joint General Staff, which exercises authority over all military forces nationwide, is composed of the three services (land, naval, and air forces), the Central Logistics Base, specialized services, and the Military Justice Corps. He is supported by the Chief of Staff of Headquarters and assisted by three Deputy Chiefs of Staff of Headquarters, responsible respectively for administration, operations, and logistics. The Deputy Chief of Staff for Administration supervises the administrative management of the armed forces, including personnel numbers, disciplinary measures, official correspondence, and soldiers' remuneration. The Deputy Chief of Staff for Operations oversees troop movements in situations where external security is threatened. The Deputy Chief of Staff for Logistics manages transport fleets, arms depots, military uniforms, and the provision of rations to personnel.

The Colonel Tshatshi Military Camp in the Kinshasa suburb of Ngaliema hosts the defence department and the Chiefs of Staff central command headquarters of the FARDC. Jane's data from 2002 appears inaccurate; there is at least one ammunition plant in Katanga.

=== Land forces ===
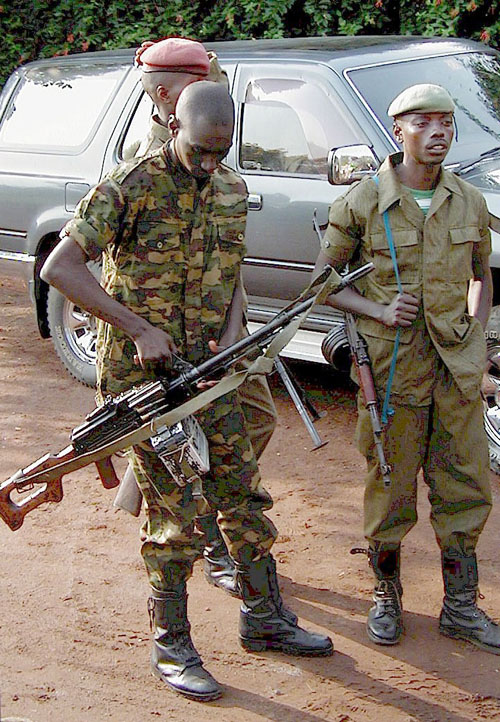
A Congolese rebel photographed near the Rwandan border in 2001.

Circa 2008–09, the land forces were made up of about 14 integrated brigades of fighters from all the former warring factions who went through a brassage integration process (see next paragraph) and a limited number of non-integrated brigades that remain solely made up of single factions (the Congolese Rally for Democracy (RCD)'s Armée national congolaise, the ex-government former Congolese Armed Forces (FAC), the ex-RCD KML, the ex-Movement for the Liberation of Congo, the armed groups of the Ituri conflict (the Mouvement des Révolutionnaires Congolais (MRC), Forces de Résistance Patriotique d'Ituri (FRPI), and the Front Nationaliste Intégrationniste (FNI)), and the Mai-Mai).

It appears that about the same time that Presidential Decree 03/042 of 18 December 2003 established the National Commission for Demobilisation and Reinsertion (CONADER), "..all ex-combatants were officially declared as FARDC soldiers and the then FARDC brigades [were to] rest deployed until the order to leave for brassage" [the military integration process].

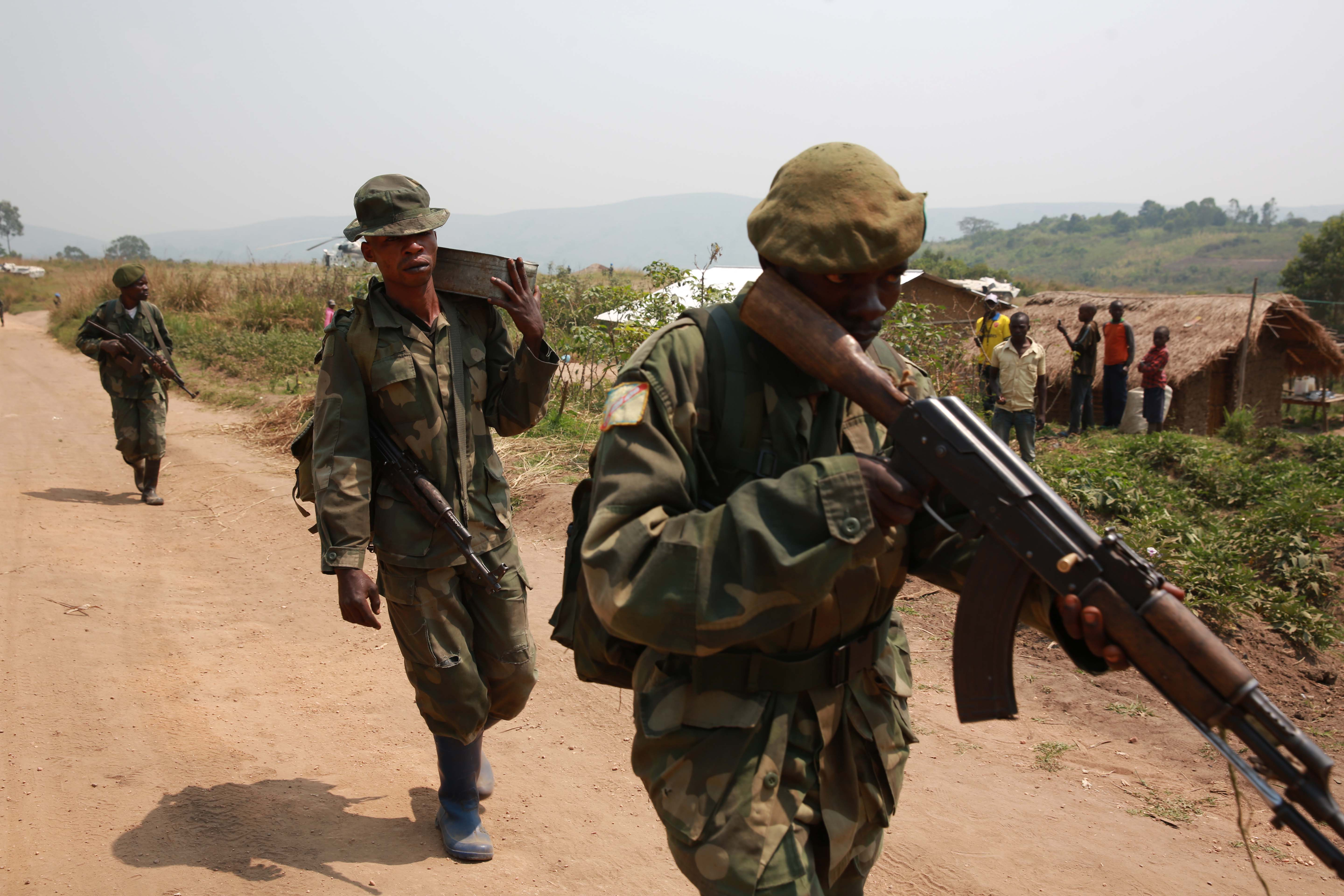
FARDC soldiers on patrol during the Ituri conflict in 2015

The reform plan adopted in 2005 envisaged the formation of eighteen integrated brigades through the military integration process as its first of three stages. The process consisted firstly of regroupment, where fighters are disarmed. Then they were sent to orientation centres, run by CONADER, where fighters took the choice of either returning to civilian society or remaining in the armed forces. Combatants who chose demobilisation received an initial cash payment of US$110. Those who chose to stay within the FARDC were then transferred to one of six integration centres for a 45-day training course, which aimed to build integrated formations out of factional fighters previously heavily divided along ethnic, political and regional lines. The centres were spread out around the country at Kitona, Kamina, Kisangani, Rumangabo and Nyaleke (within the Virunga National Park) in Nord-Kivu, and Luberizi (on the border with Burundi) in South Kivu. The process suffered severe difficulties due to construction delays, administration errors, and the amount of travel former combatants have to do, as the three stages' centres are widely separated. There were three sequential buildup stages in the 2005 plan. Following the first 18 integrated brigades, the second goal was the formation of a ready reaction force of two to three brigades, and finally, by 2010, when MONUC was hoped to have withdrawn, the creation of a Main Defence Force of three divisions.

In February 2008, then Defence Minister Chikez Diemu described the reform plan at the time as:

"The short term, 2008–2010, will see the setting in place of a Rapid Reaction Force; the medium term, 2008–2015, with a Covering Force; and finally the long term, 2015–2020, with a Principal Defence Force." Diemu added that the reform plan rests on a programme of synergy based on the four pillars of dissuasion, production, reconstruction and excellence. "The Rapid Reaction Force is expected to focus on dissuasion, through a Rapid Reaction Force of 12 battalions, capable of aiding MONUC to secure the east of the country and to realise constitutional missions."

During brassage, many former rebels became part of the national army, along with their commanders who often received high ranking positions. Due to the numerous promotions taking place at the time, the FARDC had nearly twice as many officers as foot soldiers.

Amid the other difficulties in building new armed forces for the DRC, in early 2007 the integration and training process was distorted as the DRC government under Kabila attempted to use it to gain more control over the dissident general Laurent Nkunda. A hastily negotiated verbal agreement in Rwanda saw three government FAC brigades integrated with Nkunda's former ANC 81st and 83rd Brigades in what was called mixage. Mixage brought multiple factions into composite brigades, but without the 45-day retraining provided by brassage, and it seems that actually, the process was limited to exchanging battalions between the FAC and Nkunda brigades in North Kivu, without further integration. Due to Nkunda's troops having greater cohesion, Nkunda effectively gained control of all five brigades, which was not the intention of the DRC central government. However, after Nkunda used the mixage brigades to fight the FDLR, strains arose between the FARDC and Nkunda-loyalist troops within the brigades and they fell apart in the last days of August 2007. The International Crisis Group says that "by 30 August [2007] Nkunda's troops had left the mixed brigades and controlled a large part of the Masisi and Rutshuru territories" (of North Kivu).

Both formally integrated brigades and the non-integrated units continue to conduct arbitrary arrests, rapes, robbery, and other crimes and these human rights violations are "regularly" committed by both officers and members of the rank and file. Members of the Army also often strike deals to gain access to resources with the militias they are meant to be fighting.

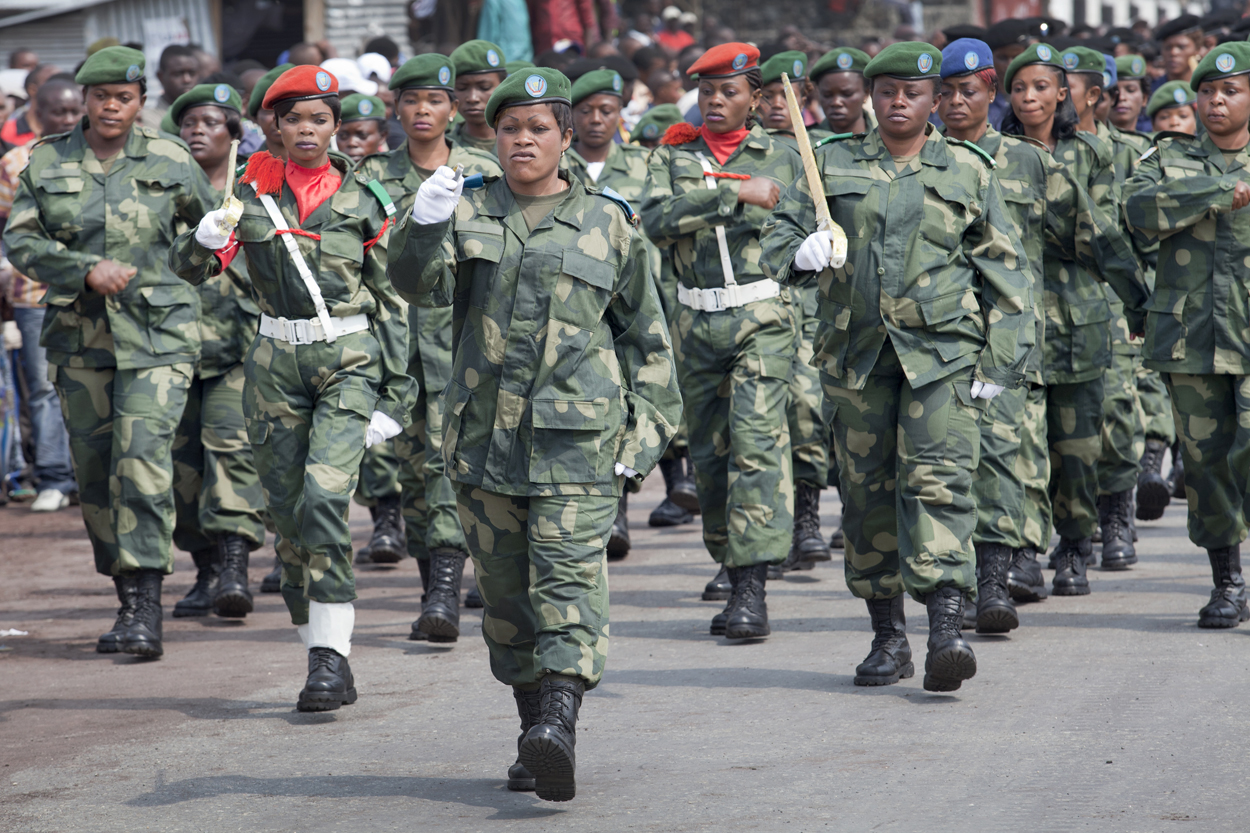
Female soldiers of the FARDC on parade in 2012

The various brigades and other formations and units number at least 100,000 troops. The status of these brigades has been described as "pretty chaotic." A 2007 disarmament and repatriation study said "army units that have not yet gone through the process of brassage are usually much smaller than what they ought to be. Some non-integrated brigades have only 500 men (and are thus nothing more than a small battalion) whereas some battalions may not even have the size of a normal company (over 100 men)."

A number of outside donor countries are also carrying out separate training programmes for various parts of the Forces Terrestres (Land Forces). The People's Republic of China has trained Congolese troops at Kamina in Katanga from at least 2004 to 2009, and the Belgian government is training at least one "rapid reaction" battalion. When Kabila visited U.S. President George W. Bush in Washington D.C., he also asked the U.S. Government to train a battalion, and as a result, a private contractor, Protection Strategies Incorporated, started training a FARDC battalion at Camp Base, Kisangani, in February 2010. The company was supervised by United States Special Operations Command Africa. Three years later, the battalion broke and ran in the face of M23, raping women and young girls, looting, and carrying out arbitrary executions. The various international training programmes are not well integrated.

==== Equipment ====
Attempting to list the equipment available to the DRC's land forces is difficult; most figures are unreliable estimates based on known items delivered in the past. The figures below are from the IISS Military Balance 2014. Much of the Army's equipment is non-operational due to insufficient maintenance—in 2002 only 20 percent of the Army's armoured vehicles were estimated as being serviceable.

- Main Battle Tanks: 12–17 x Type 59 (dropped from 30 listed in 2007), 32 x T-55, 100 x T 72. Thirty T-55s and 100 T-72 were listed in 2007, thus little new information has reached the IISS in the intervening seven years. In 2022 the IISS listed the 12-17 Type 59s, marking them as often unserviceable; the 32 T-55s; 100 T-72s, but marking them as T-72AVs, and, in addition, 25 T-64BV-1s (page 465).
- Light tanks: 10 PT-76; 30 Type 62 (serviceability in doubt). "40+" Type 62s were listed by the Military Balance in 2007. In 2022 the IISS listed 10 PT-76s and 30 Type 62s (page 465).
- Reconnaissance vehicles: Up to 17 Panhard AML-60, 14 AML-90 armoured cars, 19 EE-9 Cascavel; 2 RAM-V-2. In 2022 the IISS listed "up to 52" reconnaissance vehicles, including the "up to 17" AML-60s; and unchanged numbers of AML-90s, the EE-9s, and the two RAM-V-2s (page 465).
- Infantry Fighting Vehicles: 20 BMP-1 (number reported unchanged since 2007). The same figure of BMP-1s was listed in 2022 (page 465).
- Armoured Personnel Carriers: IISS reports tracked vehicles include 3 BTR-50, 6 MT-LB, wheeled vehicles including 30-70 BTR-60; 58 Panhard M3 (serviceability in doubt), 7 TH 390 Fahd. Same unchanged figures were listed in 2022 (page 465)
- Artillery: 16 2S1 Gvozdika and 2S3 Akatsiya self-propelled; 119 towed field guns, including 77 122 mm howitzers D-30/M-1938/Type-60 and some 130 mm Type 59; 57 MRL, including 24 Type 81; 528+ mortars, 81 mm, 82 mm, 107 mm, 120 mm.

In addition to these 2014 figures, in March 2010, it was reported that the DRC's land forces had ordered US$80 million worth of military equipment from Ukraine which included 20 T-72 main battle tanks, 100 trucks and various small arms. Tanks have been used in the Kivus in the 2005–09 period.

In February 2014, Ukraine revealed that it had achieved the first export order for the T-64 tank to the DRC Land Forces for 50 T-64BV-1s.

In June 2015 it was reported that Georgia had sold 12 of its Didgori-2 to the DRC for $4 million. The vehicles were specifically designed for reconnaissance and special operations. Two of the vehicles are a recently developed conversion to serve for medical field evacuation.

The United Nations confirmed in 2011, both from sources in the Congolese military and from officials of the Commission nationale de contrôle des armes légères et de petit calibre et de réduction de la violence armée, that the ammunition plant called Afridex in Likasi, Katanga Province, manufactures ammunition for small arms and light weapons.

In 2025 reported foreign equipment suppliers to the FARDC included the United States, Russia, China, France, the United Kingdom, Belarus, Belgium, Brazil, the Czech Republic, India, Israel, Japan, the Netherlands, Portugal, South Africa, Spain, Ukraine, and the United Arab Emirates.

==== Republican Guard ====
In addition to the other land forces, President Joseph Kabila also had a Republican Guard presidential force (Garde Républicaine or GR), formerly known as the Special Presidential Security Group (GSSP). FARDC military officials state that the Garde Républicaine is not the responsibility of FARDC, but of the Head of State. Apart from Article 140 of the Law on the Army and Defence, no legal stipulation on the DRC's Armed Forces makes provision for the GR as a distinct unit within the national army. In February 2005 President Joseph Kabila passed a decree which appointed the GR's commanding officer and "repealed any previous provisions contrary" to that decree. The GR, more than 10,000 strong (the ICG said 10,000 to 15,000 in January 2007), has better working conditions and is paid regularly, but still commits rapes and robberies in the vicinity of its bases.

In an effort to extend his personal control across the country, Joseph Kabila deployed the GR at key airports, ostensibly in preparation for an impending presidential visit. At the beginning of 2007 there were Republican Guards deployed in the central prison of Kinshasa, N'djili Airport, Bukavu, Kisangani, Kindu, Lubumbashi, Matadi, and Moanda, where they appear to answer to no local commander and have caused trouble with MONUC troops there.

The GR is also supposed to undergo the integration process, but in January 2007, only one battalion had been announced as having been integrated. Formed at a brassage centre in the Kinshasa suburb of Kibomango, the battalion included 800 men, half from the former GSSP and half from the MLC and RCD Goma.

Up until June 2016, the GR comprised three brigades, the 10th Brigade at Camp Tshatshi and the 11th at Camp Kimbembe, both in Kinshasa, and the 13th Brigade at Camp Simi Simi in Kisangani. It was reorganised on the basis of eight fighting regiments, the 14th Security and Honor Regiment, an artillery regiment, and a command brigade/regiment from that time.

==== Other forces active in the country ====
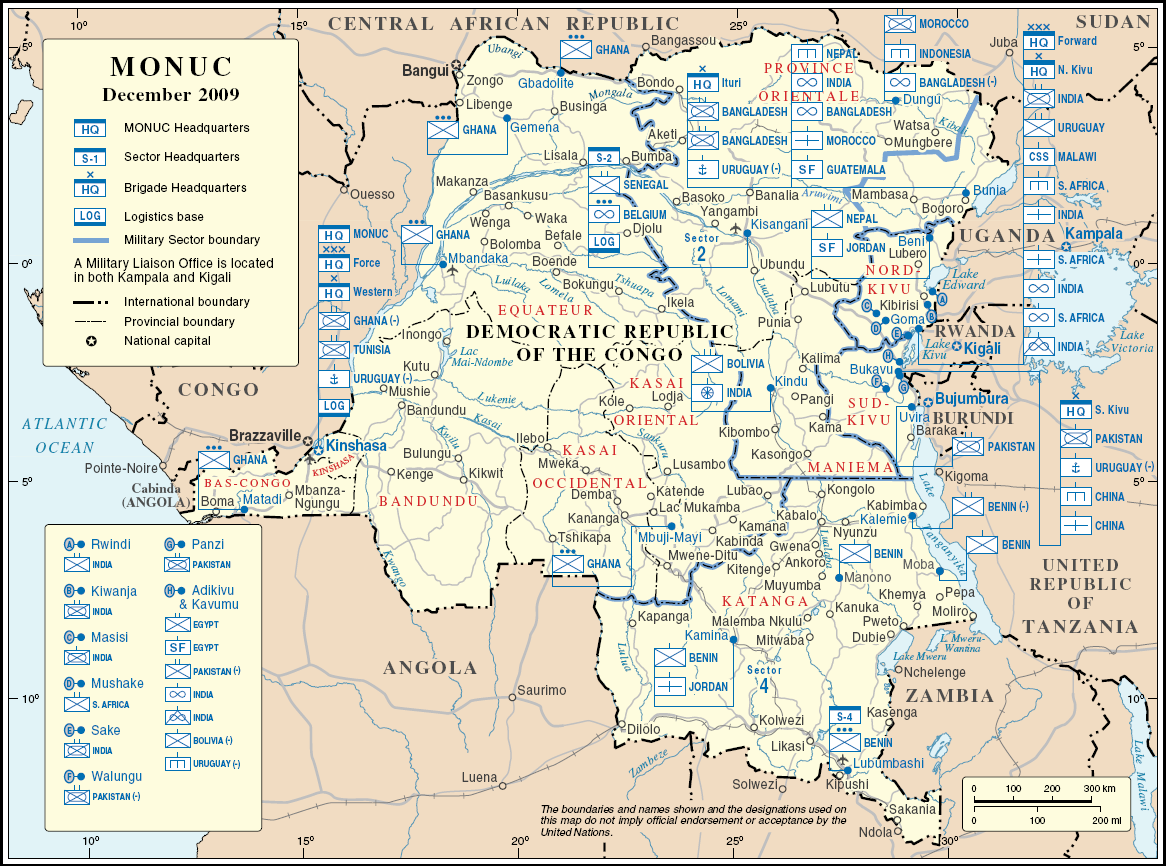
Locations of MONUC units as at December 2009

There are currently large numbers of United Nations troops stationed in the DRC. The United Nations Organization Stabilization Mission in the Democratic Republic of the Congo (MONUSCO) on 31 March 2017 had a strength of over 18,316 peacekeepers (including 16,215 military personnel) and is tasked with assisting Congolese authorities to maintain security. The UN and foreign military aid missions, the most prominent being EUSEC RD Congo, assisted in rebuilding the armed forces, with major efforts being made in trying to assure regular payment of salaries to armed forces personnel and also in military justice. Retired Canadian Lieutenant General Marc Caron also served for a time as Security Sector Reform advisor to the head of MONUC.

There is a government paramilitary force, created in 1997 under President Laurent Kabila. The National Service is tasked with providing the army with food and with training the youth in a range of reconstruction and developmental activities. There is not much further information available, and no internet-accessible source details the relationship of the National Service to other armed forces bodies; it is not listed in the constitution. President Kabila, in one of the few comments available, said the National Service will provide a gainful activity for street children. Obligatory civil service administered through the armed forces was also proposed under the Mobutu regime during the "radicalisation" programme of December 1974 – January 1975; the FAZ was opposed to the measure and the plan "took several months to die".

=== Air Force ===
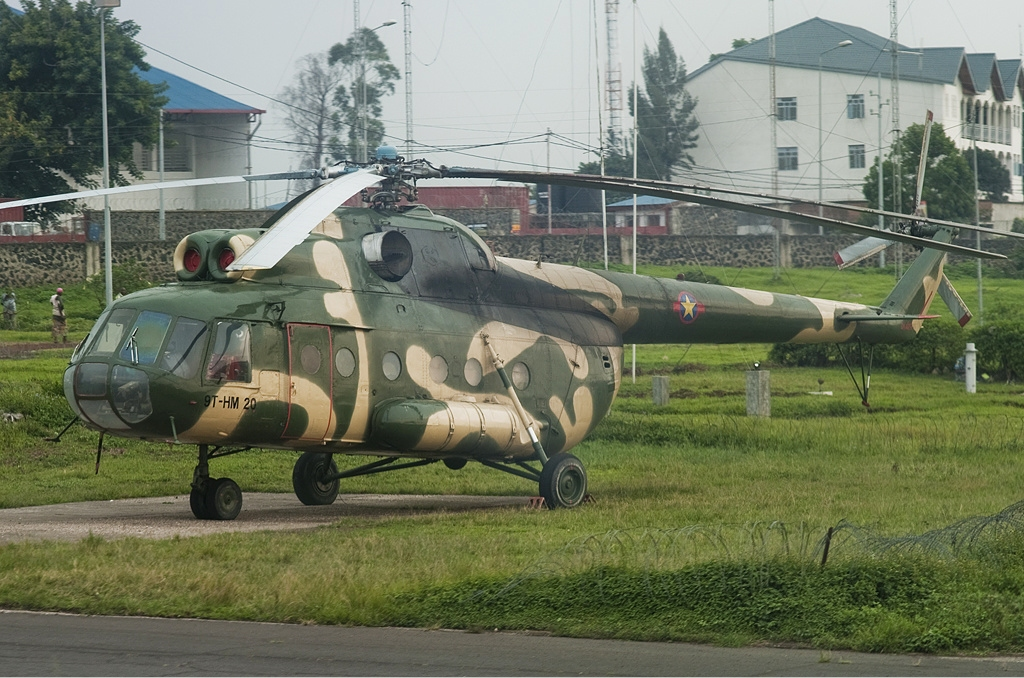
A DRC Air Force Mil Mi-8 helicopter in 2011

All military aircraft in the DRC are operated by the Air Force. In 2007, Jane's World Air Forces stated that the Air Force had an estimated strength of 1,800 personnel and is organised into two Air Groups. These groups command five wings and nine squadrons, of which not all are operational. 1 Air Group is located at Kinshasa and consists of Liaison Wing, Training Wing and Logistical Wing and has a strength of five squadrons. 2 Tactical Air Group is located at Kaminia and consists of Pursuit and Attack Wing and Tactical Transport Wing and has a strength of four squadrons. Foreign private military companies have reportedly been contracted to provide the DRC's aerial reconnaissance capability using small propeller aircraft fitted with sophisticated equipment. Jane's states that National Air Force of Angola fighter aircraft would be made available to defend Kinshasa if it came under attack.

Like the other services, the Congolese Air Force is not capable of carrying out its responsibilities. Few of the Air Force's aircraft are currently flyable or capable of being restored to service and it is unclear whether the Air Force is capable of maintaining even unsophisticated aircraft. Moreover, Jane's stated that the Air Force's Ecole de Pilotage is 'in near total disarray'.

=== Navy ===
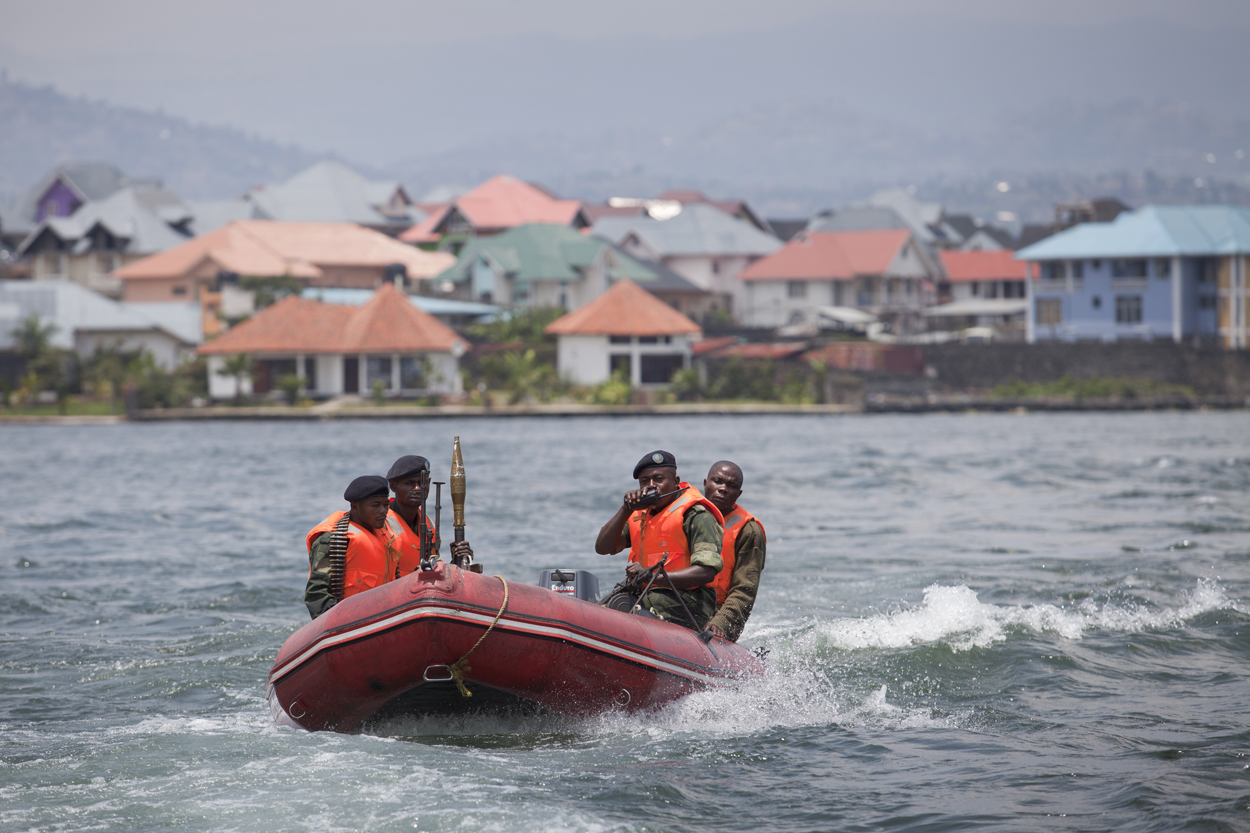
Army patrol on Lake Kivu in 2012

Before the downfall of Mobutu, a small navy operated on the Congo River. One of its installations was at the village of N'dangi near the presidential residence in Gbadolite. The port at N'dangi was the base for several patrol boats, helicopters and the presidential yacht. The 2002 edition of Jane's Sentinel described the Navy as being "in a state of near total disarray" and stated that it did not conduct any training or have operating procedures. The Navy shares the same discipline problems as the other services. It was initially placed under command of the MLC when the transition began, so the current situation is uncertain.

The 2007 edition of Jane's Fighting Ships states that the Navy is organised into four commands, based at Matadi, near the coast; the capital Kinshasa, further up the Congo river; Kalemie, on Lake Tanganyika; and Goma, on Lake Kivu. The International Institute for Strategic Studies, in its 2007 edition of the Military Balance, confirms the bases listed in Jane's and adds a fifth base at Boma, a coastal city near Matadi. Various sources also refer to numbered Naval Regions. Operations of the 1st Naval Region have been reported in Kalemie, the 4th near the northern city of Mbandaka, and the 5th at Goma.

As of 2012, the Navy on paper consisted of about 6,700 personnel and up to 23 patrol craft. The IISS repeated the same 6,700 figure in 2018 (p457) and the 2020 edition carried the same number, unchanged. In reality, The IISS lists the Navy only consists of around 1,000 personnel and a total of eight patrol craft, of which only one is operational, a Shanghai II Type 062 class gunboat designated "102". There are five other 062s as well as two Swiftships which are not currently operational, though some may be restored to service in the future. According to Jane's, the Navy also operates barges and small craft armed with machine guns.

=== Central Logistics Base ===
The Central Logistics Base (Base Logistique Centrale) functions under the authority of the Chief of the Joint General Staff and is commanded by a senior officer or general appointed and dismissed by the President of the Republic. It is composed of regional logistics bases tasked with providing logistical support to all military units deployed across the country's various military regions.

The Central Logistics Base is responsible for ensuring the continuous resupply of regional logistics bases and other units, receiving equipment evacuated from the regions and overseeing its maintenance and repair, and storing both operational and strategic reserves.

=== Military Justice ===
The organization of the Military Justice Corps is governed by Law No. 023/2002 of 18 November 2002, which established the Military Justice Code. This legislation instituted a hierarchical system of military courts in the Democratic Republic of the Congo, beginning with police courts at the base, followed by garrison military courts, military courts and operational courts, and culminating in the High Military Court.

The High Military Court is headquartered in Kinshasa and exercises jurisdiction throughout the national territory, although its seat may exceptionally be relocated by presidential ordinance. Military courts are established in provincial capitals, while garrison courts are located in each district and city, with one or more police courts operating within the jurisdiction of each garrison court. For example, Lubumbashi, the capital of Haut-Katanga Province, hosts a military court with jurisdiction over the entire province, as well as a garrison court covering the city itself and police courts. The Lubumbashi court complex is situated at the intersection of Maman Yemo and Djamena avenues in the commune of Lubumbashi.

=== Higher military schools ===
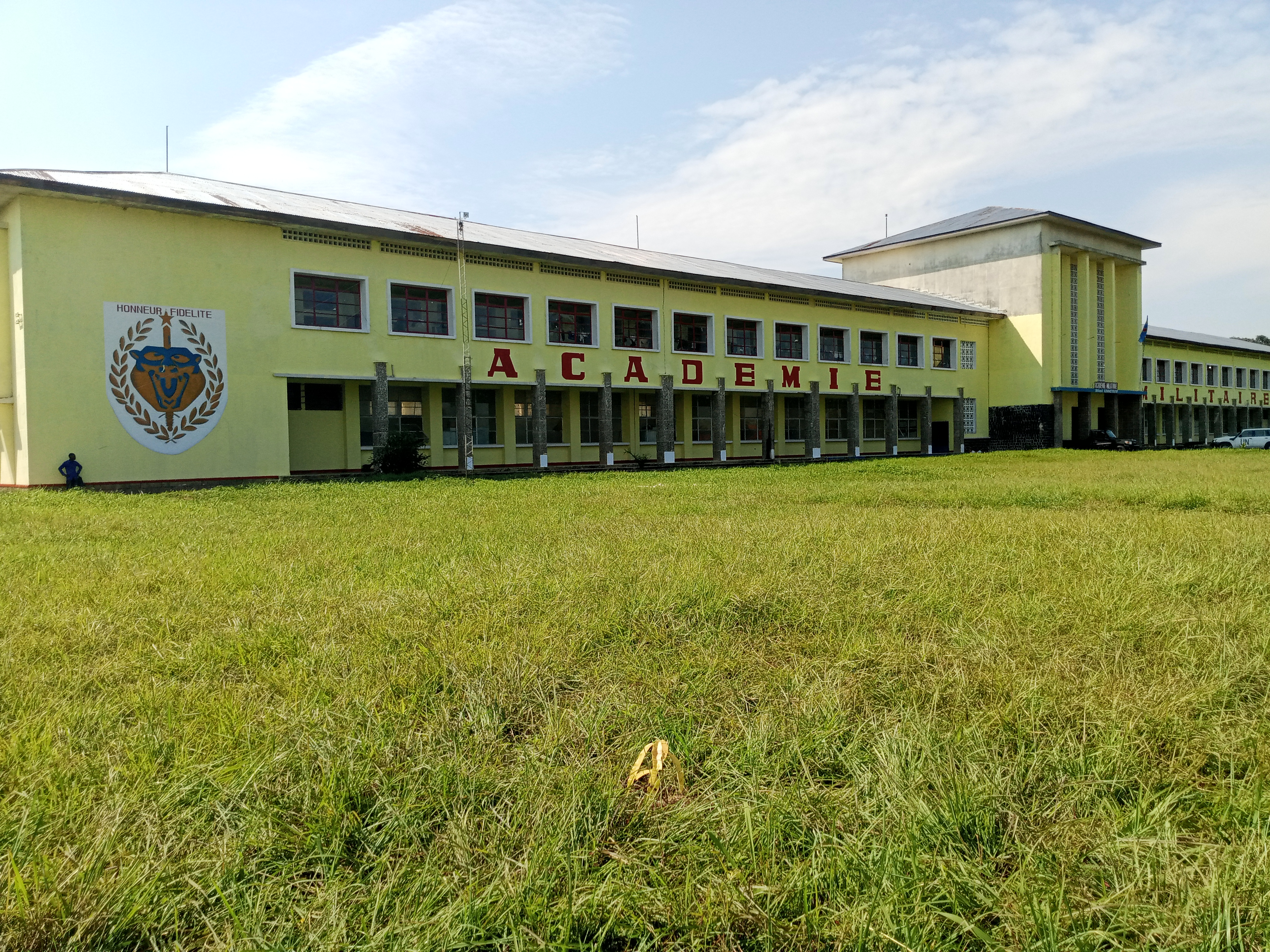
Kananga Military Academy is part of the GESM

Higher military education within the FARDC is organized through a grouping of higher military schools administered by a Commander of the Group of Military Higher Schools (Groupement des Écoles Supérieurs Militaires; GESM), holding the rank of senior officer or general. This grouping was established by Decree No. 106/2002 of 19 August 2002.

Its mandate includes providing advanced training and instruction for all officers of the armed forces, validating and disseminating doctrinal studies and documents, contributing to the drafting of regulations and directives, conducting research in the field of military education for the benefit of the Supreme Commander, and assisting in the organization and oversight of military training. The structure and functioning of the grouping are determined by the President of the Republic.

=== DEMIAP and Maison Militaire ===
The FARDC's intelligence service was created by Decree No. 018/2002 of 24 February 2002. It is known as the Directorate General for Military Detection of Anti-National Activities (Direction générale de la détection militaire des activités anti-patrie; DGDEMIAP). It is responsible for arresting and repressing any actions within the armed forces likely to undermine national security and maintains units deployed across the national territory.

The Maison militaire is the President's military office. It helps him formulate defence and security policy, and supports him in coordinating activities related to the organization, training, and equipping of the armed forces, and carrying out any additional tasks assigned by the president. It is composed of a Cabinet and three departments: the Department of Operations and Organization, the Department of Intelligence and Security, and the Administrative and Logistics Department. Each department is subdivided into specialized cells tasked with specific functions.

== Bibliography ==
- Boshoff, Henri, The DDR Process in the DRC: A Never-ending Story, Institute for Security Studies, Pretoria, 2 July 2007
- Canadian Government Immigration Review Board, Issue Paper: Zaire: The Balance of Power in the Regions, April 1997
- Cooper, Tom, & Pit Weinert, Zaire/DR Congo since 1980, Air Combat Information Group, 2 September 2003. Retrieved August 2007
- De Witte, Ludo; Wright, Ann (2002). The Assassination of Lumumba. Verso Books. ISBN 1-85984-410-3. Archived from the original on 11 January 2023.
- Ebenga, Jacques; N'Landu, Thierry (October 2005). "The Congolese National Army: In search of an identity" ( (PDF)). In Martin Rupiya (ed.). Evolutions & Revolutions: A Contemporary History of Militaries in Southern Africa. Pretoria: Institute for Security Studies. Archived from the original on 24 July 2007.
- Gérard-Libois, Jules (1966). Katanga Secession. University of Wisconsin Press.
- Hoebeke, Hans; Chiza, Christian; Mukungilwa, Bienvenu (January 2022). "The Old is Dying and The New Cannot Be Born (Yet?)". www.gicnetwork.be (in Dutch). Archived from the original on 13 December 2022.
- Human Rights Watch (February 1999). "Casualties of War: Civilians, Rule of Law, and Democratic Freedoms". Human Rights Watch. Archived from the original on 26 January 2016.
- Institute for Security Studies, Democratic Republic of Congo Security Information (updated: 12 January 2005)
- International Crisis Group, Security Sector Reform in the Congo, Africa Report N°104, 13 February 2006
- Jane's Sentinel Security Assessment—Central Africa. Issue 11–2002.
- Kanza, Thomas R. (1994). The Rise and Fall of Patrice Lumumba: Conflict in the Congo (expanded ed.). Rochester, Vermont: Schenkman Books, Inc. ISBN 0-87073-901-8.
- Keegan, John (1979). World Armies. New York: Facts on File. ISBN 0-87196-407-4.
- La Prosperite, Fardc et Police Nationale: la liste complète d'Officiers nommés, 18 June 2007
- Meditz, Sandra W.; Merrill, Tim (1993). Library of Congress Country Study Zaire 1993. Library of Congress. Archived from the original on 4 February 2018.
- Omasombo, Jean, RDC: Biography des acteurs de troiseme republique, Royal Museum of Central Africa, 2009, 152–153.
- Prunier, Gérard (July 2004). "Rebel Movements and Proxy Warfare: Uganda, Sudan and the Congo (1986–99)". African Affairs. 103 (412): 359–383. doi:10.1093/afraf/adh050. JSTOR 3518562.
- Prunier, Gerard (2009). From Genocide to Continental War: The "Congolese" Conflict and the Crisis of Contemporary Africa. Hurst & Company. ISBN 978-1-85065-523-7.
- Robinson, Colin D. (March 2021). "A forgotten decade? Politicking and war for the ANC/FAZ 1967-1977". Small Wars and Insurgencies. 32 (7): 1117–1137. doi:10.1080/09592318.2021.1895589. S2CID 233822626. Archived from the original on 16 August 2021.
- Robinson, Colin (2012). "Army reconstruction in the Democratic Republic of the Congo 2003–2009". Small Wars & Insurgencies. 23 (3): 474–499. doi:10.1080/09592318.2012.661612. S2CID 145375095.
- Saunders, Stephen (ed.). Jane's Fighting Ships Vol. 110, 2007–2008. Coulsdon: Jane's Information Group.
- Willame, Jean-Claude (1972). Patrimonialism and Political Change in the Congo. Stanford: Stanford University Press. ISBN 9780804707930.
- Wragg, David (2012). The World Sea Power Guide. Pen and Sword. ISBN 9781783035588. Archived from the original on 11 January 2023.
- Young, M. Crawford (1966). "Post-Independence Politics in the Congo". Transition (26). Indiana University Press: 34–41. doi:10.2307/2934325. JSTOR 2934325.
- Young, M. Crawford; Turner, Thomas Edwin (1985). The Rise and Decline of the Zairian State. University of Wisconsin Press. ISBN 0-299-10110-X.
- Vanderstraeten, Louis-François (1985). De la Force publique à l'Armée nationale congolaise : histoire d'une mutinerie : juillet 1960 (in French). Brussels: Académie Royale de Belgique. ISBN 978-2-8011-0557-3.
