= Kamanyola Division =

Zairian military unit

- Division de Kamanyola
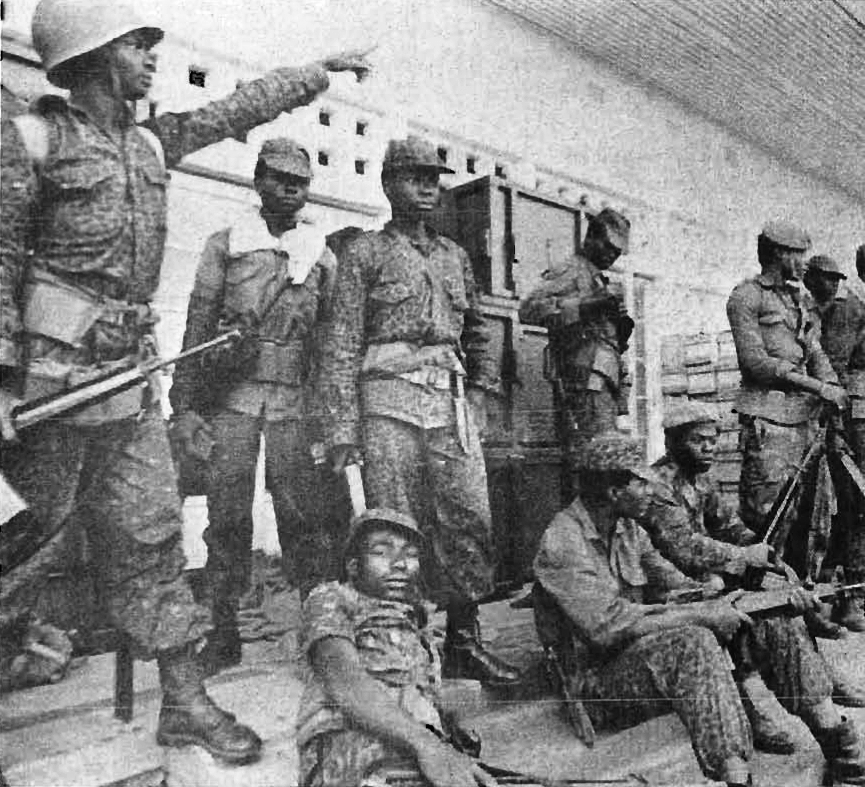
- Kamanyola Division during Shaba I in April 1977.
- Active: 1974–1997
- Country: Zaire
- Allegiance: Mobutu Sese Seko
- Branch: (Zaire) Zairian Armed Forces
- Type: Infantry division
- Size: 4,100
- Garrison/HQ: Shaba Province
- Engagements: Shaba I; Shaba II; First Congo War

The Kamanyola Division (French: Division de Kamanyola) was an infantry division of the Zairian Armed Forces from 1974 to 1997.

== History ==
The Kamanyola Division was formed in 1974 and trained by North Korea. It was named after a June 1964 incident in the eastern town of Kamanyola. Troops led personally by Mobutu secured a strategic bridge near the town of Kamanyola. In 1993, it consisted of the 11th Infantry Brigade, the 12th Infantry Brigade, and the 14th Infantry Brigade. After the Shaba I invasion, the division, at the time considered the army's best formation, and considered the president's own, was assigned permanently to the Shaba Province.

Zairian senior military officials, dissatisfied by the North Korean efforts, even asked in December 1975 that the U.S. to take over the Kamanyola Division, saying that "the North Koreans had left the Kamanyola poorly trained and without spares for the equipment they had provided."

As part of a second invasion by the former members of the Katangese Gendarmerie, known as Shaba II in May–June 1978, was only dispersed with the dispatch of the French 2nd Foreign Parachute Regiment and a battalion of the Belgian Paracommando Regiment. Kamanyola Division units collapsed almost immediately. French units fought the Battle of Kolwezi to recapture the town from the FLNC. The U.S. provided logistical assistance.

In 1988, the CIA described the Kamanyola Division as located in Shaba and consisting of 4,100 personnel, with the 14th Brigade the only combat-ready formation.

The poor state of discipline of the Zairian military became apparent again in 1990. Foreign military assistance to Zaire ceased following the end of the Cold War and Mobutu deliberately allowed the military's condition to deteriorate so that it did not threaten his hold on power.

In 1993, according to the Library of Congress Country Studies, the Kamanyola Division, consisting of three infantry brigades operated generally in western Shaba Region.

In 1997, the division was dismantled by then Congolese president Laurent Kabila.
