= Group of Military Higher Schools =

Military school in the Democratic Republic of the Congo

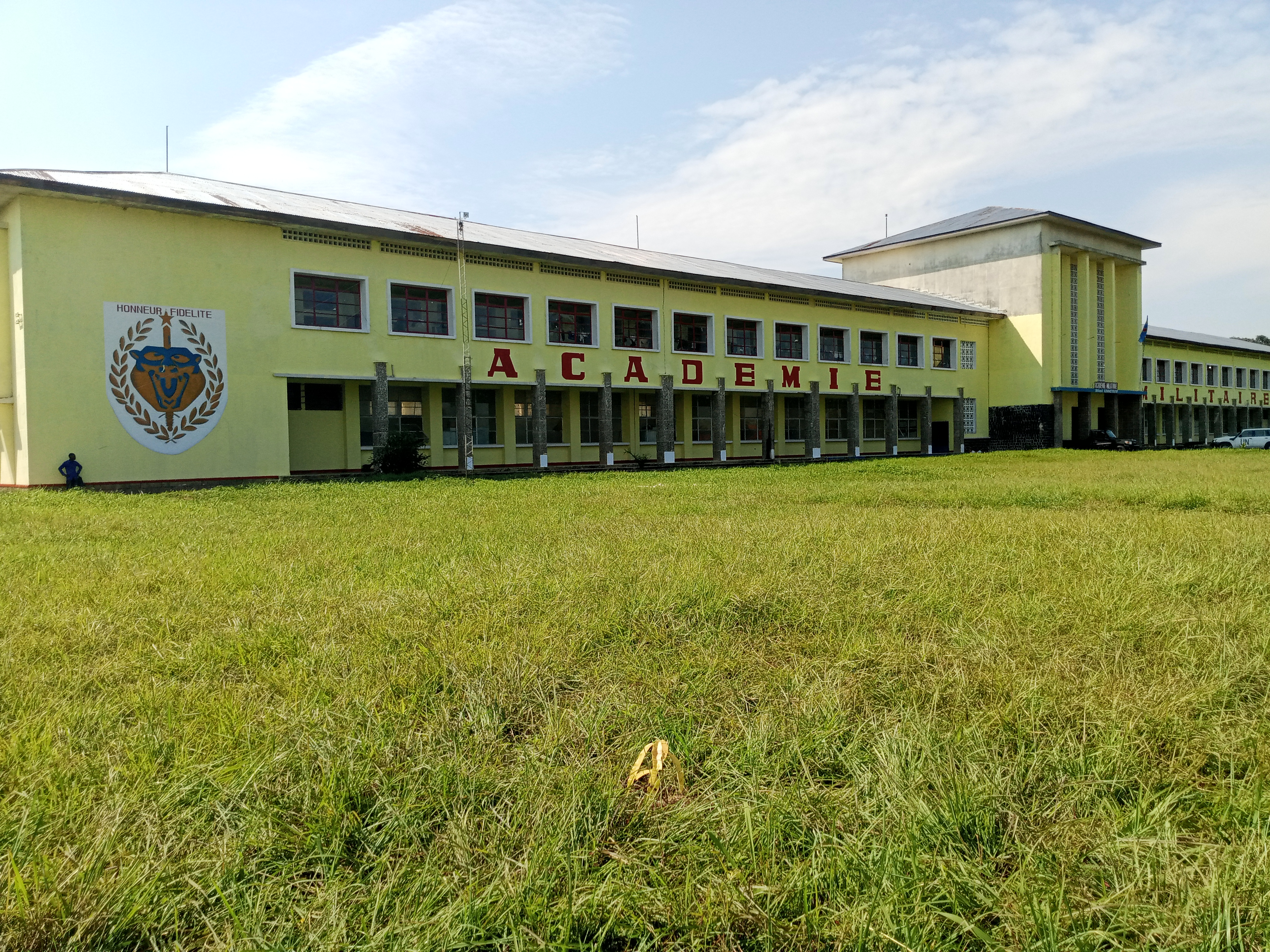
- Kananga Military Academy, part of the GESM, in 2023
- Latin: Groupement des écoles supérieures militaires
- Type: Military education and training institution
- Established: 19 August 2002; 23 years ago
- Affiliations: Armed Forces of the Democratic Republic of the Congo
- Location: Ngaliema, Kinshasa, Democratic Republic of the Congo
- Campus: Urban

The Group of Military Higher Schools (French: Groupement des écoles supérieures militaires, GESM) is the coordinating body charged with advancing military education and officer training in the Armed Forces of the Democratic Republic of the Congo (FARDC). Established by Decree No. 106/2002 of 19 August 2002, it oversees the training, development, and doctrinal education of Congolese military officers. It is headquartered in Ngaliema, Kinshasa, and is responsible for approving and publishing military doctrines, assisting in the drafting of regulations and directives, and carrying out strategic and educational studies for the benefit of the FARDC's Supreme Commander, the president of the republic.

== Organization ==
GESM is led by a senior or general officer known as the Commander of the Group of Military Higher Schools (commandant du groupement des écoles supérieures militaires) and functions under the authority of the Ministry of Defence and Veterans, with its organization determined by a ministerial order approved by the president.

The GESM brings together several higher military institutions, including the Kananga Military Academy (Académie militaire de Kananga; formerly the Officer Training School), the Higher Infantry School in Kitona (école supérieure d'infanterie), the Mbanza-Ngungu Motorized School (école motorisé de Mbanza-Ngungu), the Kamina Air School (école de l'air de Kamina), the Banana Naval School (école navale de Banana), the Kinshasa School of Military Logistics and Intelligence (école de logistique et de renseignements militaires de Kinshasa), Kinshasa Staff College (École d'État-Major de Kinshasa), and Kinshasa War College (École de Guerre de Kinshasa; EGK).

== History ==
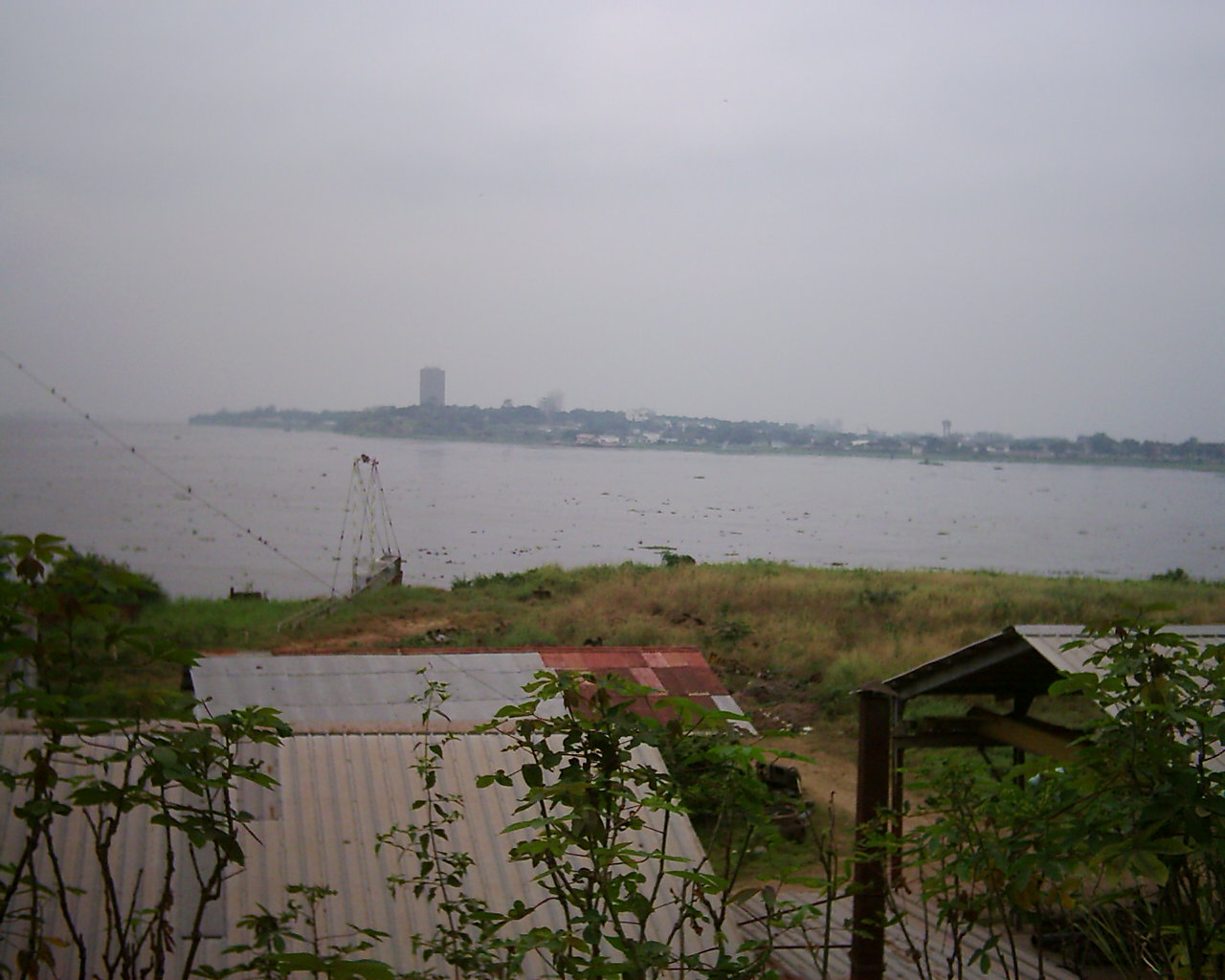
Ngaliema, home to the GESM's headquarters

The Group of Military Higher Schools (Groupement des écoles supérieures militaires, GESM) was created as part of the post–Second Congo War reorganization of the Congolese Armed Forces (Forces armées congolaises; FAC). It was formally established by Decree No. 106/2002 of 19 August 2002, signed by President Joseph Kabila, during a phase of institutional restructuring within the FAC following years of conflict and fragmentation.

In January 2003, shortly after its establishment, the GESM became an early focus of international engagement when Belgian Defense Minister André Flahaut visited the institution in Kinshasa as part of Belgium's renewed support for FARDC officer training and military infrastructure development. During the visit, Congolese authorities outlined the GESM's training mission and accentuated the severe deterioration of its facilities after years of conflict, estimating that approximately $3 million would be required for rehabilitation and expressing hope that renewed Belgian cooperation would contribute to the reconstruction and professionalization of the armed forces. In June 2005, the GESM benefited from the revival of Franco-Congolese military cooperation following the signing of a bilateral defense agreement by French Ambassador Georges Serre and Congolese Defense Minister Adolphe Onusumba Yemba, the first such accord since cooperation had been suspended in 1994. The pact outlined the creation of a digital training room, and in September 2005, a computer-based training center was officially opened at the Centre Supérieur Militaire in Kinshasa during a ceremony co-chaired by Onusumba and Serre, with technical assistance from a French expert and the donation of approximately 500 books to the GESM library.

In September 2006, Franco-Congolese cooperation deepened with the signing of a second agreement that established a documentation and information center, which was implemented under the supervision of French technical military cooperator Lieutenant Colonel Éric Branche. By 2008, this center was fully operational, containing a library, reprography services, an internet room, and multipurpose spaces, and financed through joint contributions of roughly $135,000 from France and $20,000 from the DRC. These developments coincided with the rehabilitation of a new amphitheater at the GESM and cost approximately $750,000. That same year, cooperation with the United Kingdom contributed to the GESM's expansion through a partnership revived in August 2006 with the support of the British Council, under which two buildings and four rehabilitated blocks, including trainee housing and classrooms, were inaugurated and handed over to the Congolese Ministry of Defense by British Minister of State for Africa Mark Malloch Brown. British assistance also included computer and teaching equipment and the funding of specialized training programs, particularly in peacekeeping, English-language instruction, and military justice. The same year also saw the GESM established the Kinshasa Staff College (École d'État-Major de Kinshasa) under a Franco-Congolese agreement signed by Defense Minister Charles Mwando Nsimba and Ambassador Pierre Jacquemot, with a joint budget of approximately $537,000. Designed to train officers for senior command roles, the Staff College was intended to evolve into a regional institution aligned with the Economic Community of Central African States (ECCAS) center of excellence initiative. By that time, the GESM had trained approximately 2,384 officers from the FARDC and the Congolese National Police.

From 2005 onward, the GESM also served as a platform for large-scale training supported by the United States, with U.S. instructors assisting in continuous professional development programs at the Binza–Ozone site. By December 2008, twelve training cycles had produced 947 retrained FARDC officers. In August 2009, a newly rehabilitated and equipped amphitheater at the GESM complex in Ngaliema was inaugurated by Defense Minister Mwando Nsimba and Ambassador Jacquemot, following a 2007 bilateral convention jointly financed by France and the Democratic Republic of the Congo. Additional British-funded infrastructure improvements followed in November 2009 with the inauguration of new dining facilities for FARDC personnel. In the early 2010s, the GESM continued to host specialized training, including a U.S.-funded military intelligence course in early 2013 and peacekeeping-oriented English-language training supported by the United Kingdom, which culminated in April 2013 with the graduation of 65 officers after a nine-month program and was later expanded to the Officer Training School (École de formation des officiers, EFO; now the Kananga Military Academy, Académie militaire de Kananga) with GESM support.
