= 1975 Zaire coup attempt =

- Part of Cold War
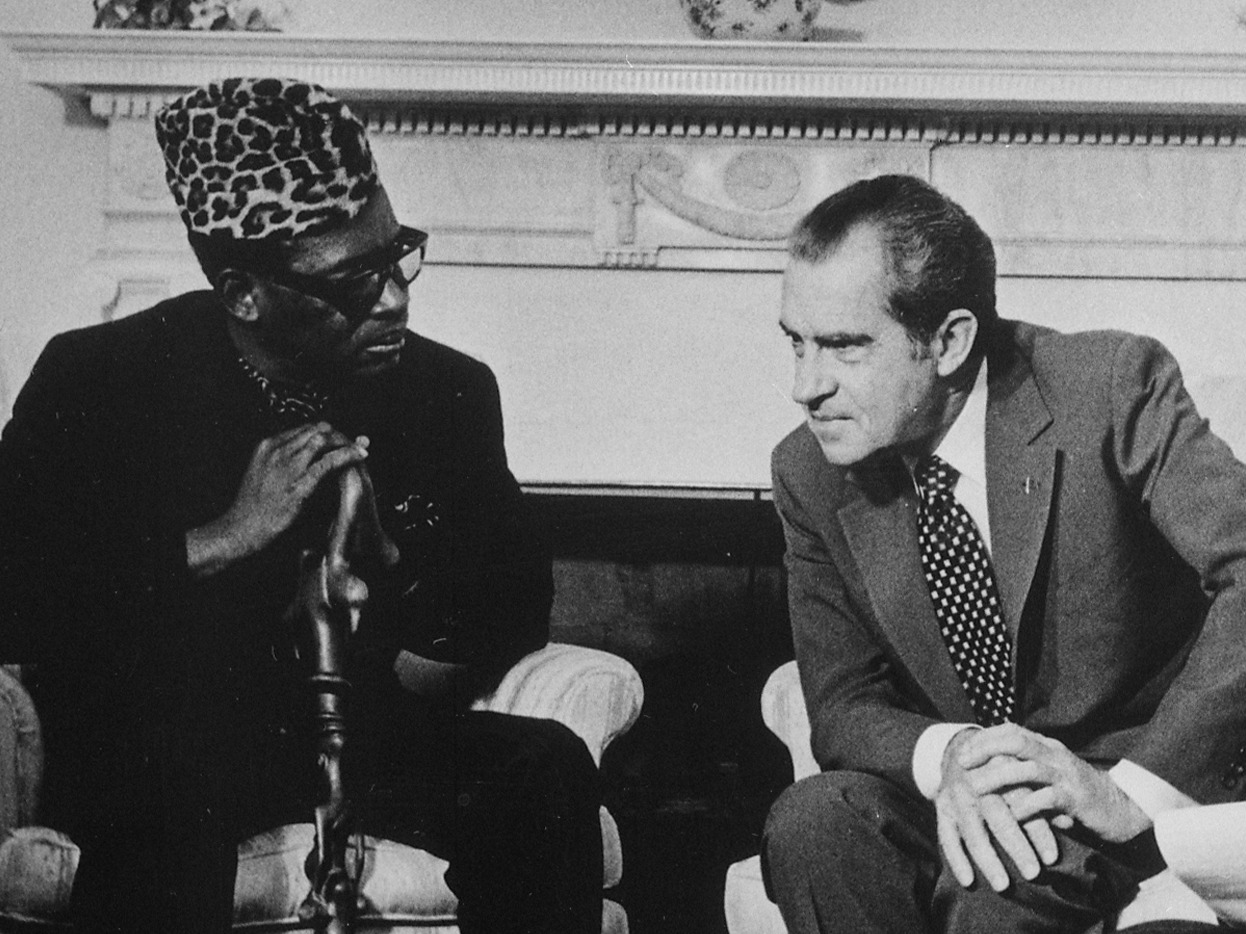
- Mobutu Sese Seko in the White House (1973)
- Date: June 1975
- Location: Zaire
- Type: Assassination plot and coup attempt
- Motive: Plan to oust and kill Mobutu and install Omba Pene Djunga in power
- Target: Mobutu Sese Seko
- Arrests: Six officers arrested

The 1975 Zaire coup attempt was an alleged plot to overthrow or assassinate President Mobutu Sese Seko of Zaire (now the Democratic Republic of the Congo), announced by the Zairian government in June 1975. The government-controlled press accused the United States and the Central Intelligence Agency (CIA) of involvement. U.S. officials denied the accusations, and the American ambassador, Deane R. Hinton, was expelled. Foreign observers in Kinshasa doubted that an actual coup attempt had occurred and suggested that the episode may have been used to remove Hinton or to address domestic political and financial pressures.

== Background ==
in 1973 and 1974, Mobutu had broken off relations with the State of Israel, had nationalized many foreign-owned businesses in the country, and also cultivated ties with China and North Korea. His government also had condemned the appointment of Nathaniel Davis as Assistant Secretary of State for African Affairs.

By 1975, the United States had close to a billion dollars invested into Zaire. Foreign economists and Zairian sources said Zaire had spent $200–300 million of its foreign reserves in the preceding year. Diplomatic sources said Washington had agreed to lend more money to rebuild reserves but insisted that it must have a say in import spending, which the Mobutu government balked at.

In January 1975, Mobutu publicly criticized President Gerald Ford's nomination of Nathaniel Davis as Assistant Secretary of State for African Affairs. The United States protested the remarks privately, instructing Ambassador Hinton to tell Mobutu that the public criticism was an improper comment to make on a U.S. domestic appointment.

== Announcement and accusations ==
On 17 June 1975, the government-controlled daily Elima published a letter from Mobutu stating that there had been an unsuccessful coup attempt aimed at his "physical elimination" and blaming unnamed "imperialists" and Zairians "thirsty for money". In the letter, Mobutu attributed the alleged plot to imperialists who were displeased by his break with Israel, his nationalization of many foreign-owned businesses, his condemnation of Nathaniel Davis's appointment as Assistant Secretary of State for African Affairs, and Zaire's relations with China and North Korea. No details of the reported plot were made public. Later reports in the Zairian press specifically accused the Central Intelligence Agency of organizing the plot.

The same newspaper carried an editorial indicating that those who had attempted to eliminate Mobutu came from the United States; it warned that "if any misfortune should come to the President", no "Yankees" would leave Zaire alive. American embassy sources denied any knowledge of an attempted coup and expressed surprise, saying relations had been very good.

On 18 June, the newspaper Salongo repeated the accusation of U.S. support and named six senior army officers it said had been arrested, but also gave no details of the reported plot. Thousands of people marched through Kinshasa in government-organized demonstrations in support of Mobutu. A later analysis by Colonel Kisukula Abeli Meitho indicated that these officers were accused of plotting to bring Colonel Omba Pene Djunga, Mobutu’s private secretary, to power.

== Arrests ==
The six officers named by Salongo were Brigadier General Katsuva Wa Kasivwira, the political commissar and chief of staff of the ground forces; Brigadier General Utshudi Wembolenga, former commander of the second military region at Lubumbashi; Brigadier General Fallu Sumbu, the former military attaché at the Zairian Embassy in Washington; Colonel Omba Pene Djunga, a private secretary to Mobutu; Major Bula Butupu Bajikila, who had returned four months earlier from a U.S. military school and was assigned to the general staff; and Major Mpika Ntoya Zi Bikembo, who had recently returned from Fort Bragg. The newspaper reported that Major Mpika had prepared, as a class assignment, a report on "how to plan and carry out a coup d'état against the Government of Zaire". Several of the arrested officers had studied or served in the United States; embassy sources said such training was routine and that the Zairian government selected the students.

== United States response and expulsion ==
Before the public accusations, Ambassador Hinton's relationship with Mobutu had already deteriorated. Hinton had not met the president for several months, and he told colleagues that the situation was "traumatic" and that he believed his "days were numbered" in Kinshasa.

Hinton had reported on 13 June that Kinshasa was already "buzzing with rumors" of a coup or assassination attempt and that arrests had been made; he wrote that the "superficial appearance of connections with the U.S." was disturbing, but said interrogation would show the United States had not been party to any plot. After the press accusations, embassy sources said there was "no truth to these rumors" and that any facts had been "manufactured". The Zairian Foreign Ministry summoned Hinton and ordered him to leave the country. On his departure, Hinton called the CIA allegations "incredible and preposterous" and said anti-Western elements in Zaire had misled Mobutu. Secretary of State Henry Kissinger said the expulsion order was based on "totally wrong information" that was "probably the result of forgery". A mission led by former ambassador Sheldon B. Vance arrived in Kinshasa after Hinton's departure to try to convince Mobutu that the United States had not been involved. No Americans were arrested in connection with the alleged plot.

== Assessments ==
Some foreign diplomats and nongovernmental observers in Kinshasa viewed the entire incident as a "well-planned and well-executed Zaire campaign" rather than evidence of an actual coup. The New York Times reported that "a number of sources in Zaire have said that there was never any coup attempt but that Mr. Mobutu used the charges to get rid of Mr. Hinton", whom he considered too close to Kissinger and Davis. Others suggested that the government was irritated by U.S. refusal to help with serious financial problems without oversight. The Zaire government offered no proof of CIA planning.

== Bibliography ==
- Meitho, Kisukula Abeli (2001). La désintégration de l'armée congolaise de Mobutu à Kabila (in French). L'Harmattan. ISBN 978-2738486936.
