= Didier Etumba =

Didier Etumba Longila
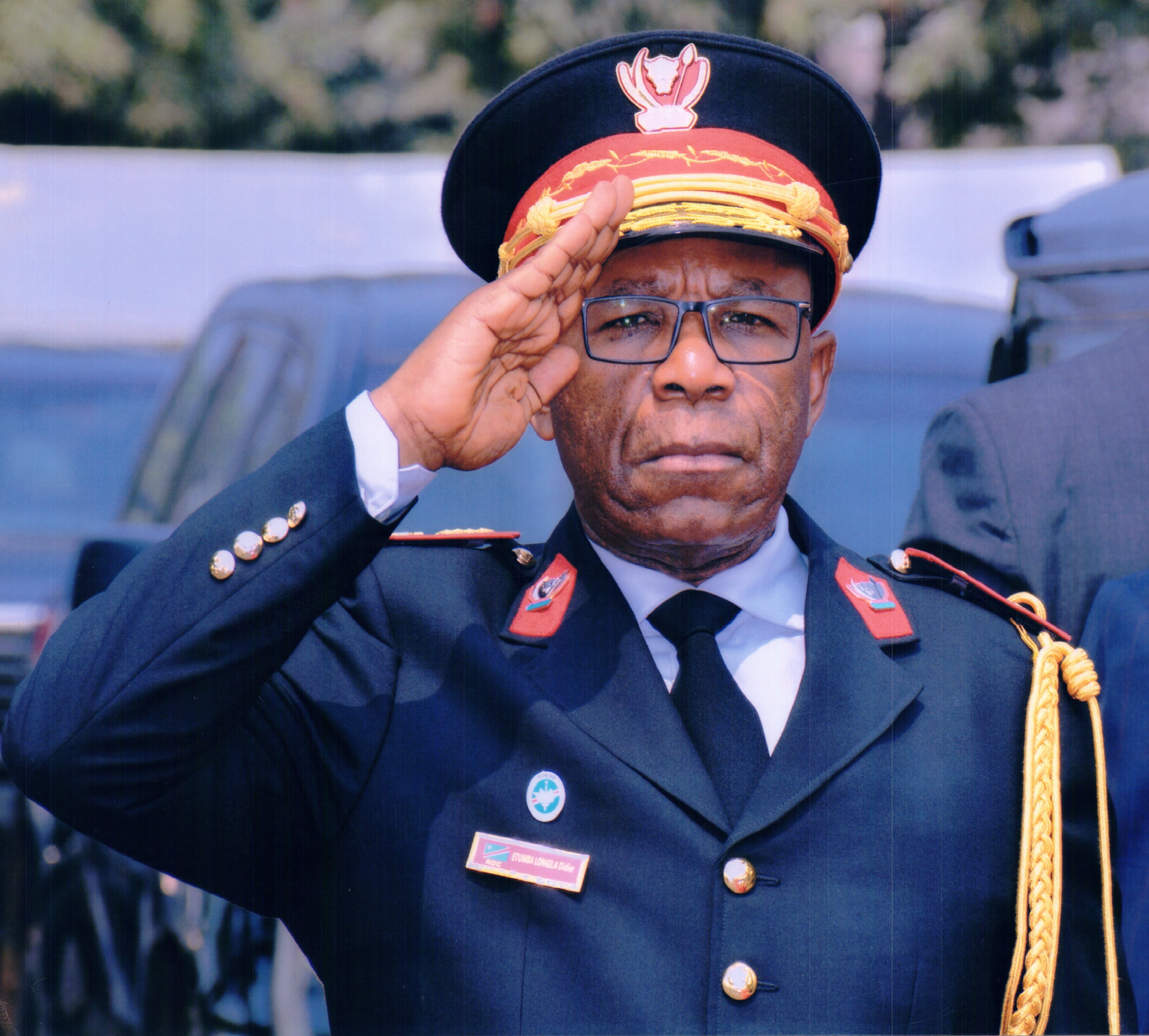
- Born: 15 July 1955 (age 71); Basankusu Territory, Équateur, Belgian Congo
- Education: Royal Military Academy
- Military career
- Allegiance: Zaire (to 1997); Democratic Republic of the Congo
- Branch: Land Forces; Navy (2007–2008)
- Service years: 1979–2018
- Rank: General of the Army (Land Forces); Vice Admiral (Navy)
- Commands: Chief of Staff of the Armed Forces of the Democratic Republic of the Congo; Navy; Military Intelligence
- Conflicts: First Congo War; Second Congo War; Kivu conflict

Didier Etumba Longila (born 15 July 1955) is a retired Congolese military officer who last served as Chief of Staff of the Armed Forces of the Democratic Republic of the Congo (FARDC) from 2008 to 2018.

Etumba was born in the Basankusu Territory, Belgian Congo. He joined the armed forces of Zaire in 1979 and graduated from Belgium's Royal Military Academy before returning to his country in 1986. He served as a gendarmerie officer in the years leading up to the First Congo War. Etumba became an advisor to President Laurent-Désiré Kabila after the conflict, and took part in the negotiation process during the Second Congo War, being present at the Lusaka and Sun City talks. In 2002 he became the head of the internal department at DEMIAP, before being appointed as chief of the reformed military intelligence agency in 2003.

President Joseph Kabila appointed Etumba as the chief of staff of the Congolese navy in 2007. In 2008, he was became the armed forces chief of staff, amidst the Kivu conflict against CNDP rebels.

== Early life and education ==
Didier Etumba Longila was born in the Basankusu Territory in Équateur, Belgian Congo, and is a member of the Mongo ethnic group. He joined the Forces Armées Zaïroises (FAZ) in 1979, and attended Belgium's Royal Military Academy. Etumba also obtained a degree in criminology.

== Military career ==
After returning from Belgium in 1986, Etumba received the rank of lieutenant. He served in the gendarmerie during the regime of Mobutu Sese Seko and reached the rank of major. After the First Congo War and the victory of the Alliance of Democratic Forces for the Liberation of Congo-Zaire (AFDL) in 1997, Etumba served in Laurent-Désiré Kabila's government as an advisor to the president and chief of staff of the military intelligence agency DEMIAP. During the Second Congo War he was involved in the negotiations for the Lusaka Peace Agreement and the Sun City Agreement. On 14 February 2002, he was promoted to colonel and became the director of the internal security department of DEMIAP. Etumba was a spokesman for the Defense and Security Commission during the peace process in the Second Congo War.

He was appointed as chief of staff of military intelligence (the former DEMIAP), with the rank of brigadier general, on 19 August 2003. At some point he was elevated to the rank of major general. On 13 June 2007, it was announced that Etumba was appointed as chief of staff of the Congolese navy with the rank of vice admiral. On 18 November 2008, Etumba was appointed as Chief of Staff of the Armed Forces of the Democratic Republic of the Congo (FARDC) by President Joseph Kabila, with the rank of lieutenant general, amidst low morale and indiscipline during fighting against rebels in the east.

After the integration of former CNDP rebels into the FARDC's eastern Congo command structure, Etumba reportedly made an "alliance" with Faustin Munene, a Congolese general living in exile in Brazzaville, Republic of the Congo, after a failed coup attempt in 2010. He lived with ex-FAZ Mobutu loyalists that had been on the losing side of the First Congo War in 1997, and Etumba, representing the western command structure of the FARDC that was hostile to the CNDP, was allegedly in contact with them. In January 2012 he was reported to have resisted an attempt by Kabila to force him to resign.

== Later work ==
Etumba worked for Emmanuel Ramazani Shadary's presidential campaign for the December 2018 general election.

Military offices
Preceded by Dieudonné Kayembe as Director-General of the Military Detection of Unpatriotic Activities	Chief of Staff of Military Intelligence; 2003–2007	Succeeded by Kitenge Tundwa
Preceded by Dieudonne Amuli Bahigwa	Chief of Staff of the Navy of the Democratic Republic of the Congo; 2007–2008	Succeeded by Emmanuel Kyabu Kaniki
Preceded by Dieudonné Kayembe	Chief of Staff of the Armed Forces of the Democratic Republic of the Congo; 2008–2018	Succeeded by Célestin Mbala
