= Sylvestre Lwetcha =

- Born: 1926 or 1927 (age 99–100); South Kivu, Belgian Congo
- Occupation: Soldier
- Military career
- Allegiance: DR Congo
- Branch: Land Forces
- Service years: 1960s–2003
- Rank: General
- Commands: Congolese Armed Forces
- Conflicts: Simba rebellion First Congo War; Second Congo War

Lieutenant General Marie Sylvestre Lwetcha (born c. 1926 or 1927) is a Congolese former military officer who served as chief of staff of the Congolese Armed Forces from 1999 to 2003, during the Second Congo War.

== Biography ==
Marie Sylvestre Lwetcha is a Bembe born in South Kivu, Belgian Congo, c. 1926 or 1927. He had no education and joined the Simba rebellion in the 1960s. In 1969, he became a member of Laurent-Désiré Kabila's Party of the People's Revolution (PRP), in opposition to the rule of Mobutu Sese Seko in Zaire. He developed a reputation as a Kabila loyalist. During the Second Congo War, despite his old age, Lwetcha traveled to Lubumbashi and then went from there to the eastern DRC partly on foot, where the Mai-Mai were engaged in combat with Rwandan-backed rebels. On 3 September 1999, Lieutenant General Lwetcha was appointed as chief of staff of the Congolese Armed Forces (FAC) by Kabila, at the age of 72. At the same time, Kabila appointed his son Joseph Kabila as chief of staff of the land forces. Lwetcha was tasked with keeping the loosely pro-government Mai-Mai militias under Kinshasa's control.

The Rally for Congolese Democracy–Goma (RCD–Goma) claimed Lwetcha had been killed in action in Itombwe Mountains south of Bukavu, while commanding Mai-Mai fighters. However, he turned up in Kigoma, Tanzania, in February 2000. He then returned to the DRC after reaching Dar es Salaam. Lwetcha was in bad physical condition, but was successful in coordinating some Mai-Mai guerillas, and they started receiving more regular supplies from Kinshasa in March 2000. Lwetcha resumed his duties as military chief in April 2000, and became very popular among the troops due to his efforts to help the Mai-Mai, but was not a capable chief of staff. In December 2000, he denied a report by the African Human Rights Association that the government summarily executed an officer who had been promoted by Kabila after their victory during the First Congo War in 1997, and 34 of his colleagues.

After Joseph Kabila assumed power in January 2001, he kept Lwetcha at his post but appointed Dieudonné Kayembe as his deputy, who practically ran the FAC. Lwetcha's presence there was a sign of the government's continued support for the Mai-Mai. After the peace agreements that ended the war, which included power-sharing arrangements, a new chief of staff was appointed for the unified Armed Forces of the DRC on 20 August 2003, and Lwetcha was removed.

== Citations ==
Military offices
Preceded by Faustin Munene	Chief of Staff of the Congolese Armed Forces; 1999–2003	Succeeded by Baudouin Liwanga
