= Chief of Staff of the Armed Forces of the Democratic Republic of the Congo =

Head of the armed forces of the Democratic Republic of the Congo

- Chef d'état-major des Forces armées de la République démocratique du Congo
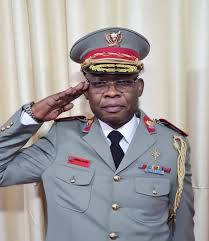
- Incumbent; Jules Banza Mwilambwe since 19 December 2024
- Ministry of Defence
- Reports to: Minister of Defence
- Appointer: President of the Democratic Republic of the Congo
- Formation: 30 June 1960
- First holder: Victor Lundula

This is a list of chiefs of staff of the armed forces of the Democratic Republic of the Congo and Zaire.

The available information on the following officers is incomplete and sometimes contradictory. In addition to armed forces chiefs of staff, in 1966 Lieutenant Colonel Ferdinand Malila was listed as Army Chief of Staff.

== Republic of the Congo (1960–71) ==
No.	Portrait	Chief of the General Staff	Took office	Left office	Time in office	Defence branch	Ref.
1	Victor Lundula	Major General; Victor Lundula	November 1960	1961	0–1 years	Land Forces	.
2	Joseph-Désiré Mobutu	Lieutenant General; Joseph-Désiré Mobutu (1930–1997) (Note: Promoted major-general 23 January 1961.)	1961	October 1964	2–3 years	Land Forces	
3	Léonard Mulamba	Major General; Léonard Mulamba (1928–1986) (Note: Chief of Staff since October 1964, until named Prime Minister after coup of 25 November 1965.)	October 1964	25 November 1965	1 year, 1 month	Land Forces	.
4	Louis Bobozo	General; Louis Bobozo (1915–1982) (Note: Commandant en chef de l'Armée nationale congolaise. Bobozo was a Major General in 1965 and appears to have been a full General by 1972. Entered the Force Publique on 23 June 1933; after training, joined 3rd Company, 14th Battalion Service Territoriale at Lisala 3 September 1935; promoted Corporal 1 May 1938; promoted Sergeant 19 April 1940, took part in Abyssian Campaign; 1st Sergeant 1947; First Sergeant-Major 1 January 1951. Despatched to Adjutants' School for the Force Publique at Luluabourg, 5 September 1959. Part of 4 Brigade, Thysville, 1960, and became commander of the brigade after 30 June 1960. Promoted in 1961 to Colonel. Tasked with organising units for operations in Katanga; became commander of 4th Groupement, Elisabethville, 1964 and promoted to Major-General. Became C.-in-C. 25 November 1965; retired 25 July 1972.)	25 November 1965	25 July 1972	6 years, 243 days	Land Forces	

== Republic of Zaire (1971–97) ==
Following Mobutu Sese Seko's take over of Republic of the Congo, the country was renamed the Republic of Zaire.

No.	Portrait	Chief of the General Staff	Took office	Left office	Time in office	Defence branch	Ref.
1	Bumba Moaso	Brigadier General; Bumba Moaso (Note: former commander of the Airborne Division (DITRAC: Division de Troupes Aeromobiles Reinforcee de Choc). From Equateur; Crawford and Young describe him as 'illiterate, but a forceful personality.' One of a number of military leaders who entered the Popular Movement of the Revolution (MPR) Political Bureau in 1975, when the MPR was merged with the state, and in 1975 became one of the eight permanent members of the Political Bureau. Captain General of the Forces Armées Zaïroises.)	25 July 1972	1977	4–5 years	Land Forces	.
2	Babia Zangi Malobia	Général de corps d'armée Babia Zangi Malobia (Note: Former Director-General of the Defence Ministry, and graduate of the Belgian defence academy.)	September 1978	1981	2–3 years	Land Forces	.
3	Mosambaye Singa Boyenge	Général d'armée Mosambaye Singa Boyenge (1932–2001)	1981	1985	3–4 years	Land Forces	
4	Eluki Monga Aundu	Général de Division; Eluki Monga Aundu (1941–2022)	1985	October 1987	1–2 years	Land Forces	
5	Lomponda Wa Botende [fr]	Admiral; Lomponda Wa Botende (born 1936)	October 1987	1989	1–2 years	Navy	.
6	Mazembe ba Embanga	Général d'Armée; Mazembe ba Embanga	1989	1991	1–2 years	Land Forces	.
7	Donatien Mahele Lieko Bokungu	Général; Donatien Mahele Lieko Bokungu (1941–1997)	1991	February 1993	1–2 years	Land Forces	
(4)	Eluki Monga Aundu	Général; Eluki Monga Aundu (1941–2022)	February 1993	20 November 1996	3 years, 9 months	Land Forces	.
(7)	Donatien Mahele Lieko Bokungu	Général; Donatien Mahele Lieko Bokungu (1941–1997)	20 November 1996	16 May 1997 †	177 days	Land Forces	.

== Democratic Republic of the Congo (1997–present) ==
No.	Portrait	Chief of Staff	Took office	Left office	Time in office	Defence branch	Ref.
1	James Kabarebe	General; James Kabarebe (born 1959)	17 May 1997	16 July 1998	1 year, 60 days	Land Forces	
2	Célestin Kifwa	Célestin Kifwa	16 July 1998	15 August 1998	30 days	Land Forces	
3	Joseph Kabila	Major General; Joseph Kabila (born 1971) (Note: Took control of the army after Celestin Kifwa was removed as Chief of Staff by Laurent-Desire Kabila.)	15 August 1998	20 October 1998	97 days	Land Forces	
4	Eddy Kapend	Colonel; Eddy Kapend (born 1960)	20 October 1998	1999	~101 days	Land Forces	
5	Faustin Munene	Major General; Faustin Munene (born 1951)	1999	3 September 1999	~6 months	Air Force	
6	Sylvestre Lwetcha	Lieutenant General; Sylvestre Lwetcha (born ?) (Note: Reappointed 8 March 2001 in accordance with Decree 010/2001.)	3 September 1999	19 August 2003	3 years, 11 months	Land Forces	
7	Baudouin Liwanga	Grand Admiral; Baudouin Liwanga (born 1950)	19 August 2003	21 June 2004	307 days	Navy	
8	Kisempia Sungilanga	Lieutenant General; Kisempia Sungilanga (born ?)	21 June 2004	12 June 2007	2 years, 356 days	Land Forces	
9	Dieudonné Kayembe	Lieutenant General; Dieudonné Kayembe (born 1945)	12 June 2007	17 November 2008	1 year, 158 days	Land Forces	.
10	Didier Etumba	Army General; Didier Etumba (born 1955)	17 November 2008	14 July 2018	9 years, 239 days	Land Forces	
11	Célestin Mbala	Lieutenant General; Célestin Mbala (born 1956)	14 July 2018	4 October 2022	4 years, 82 days	Land Forces	
12	Christian Tshiwewe	Lieutenant General; Christian Tshiwewe (born 1968)	4 October 2022	19 December 2024	2 years, 76 days	Land Forces	
13	Jules Banza Mwilambwe	Lieutenant General; Jules Banza Mwilambwe (born 1971)	19 December 2024	Incumbent	1 year, 332 days	Land Forces	
