= List of strikes in the Democratic Republic of the Congo =

Throughout the history of the Democratic Republic of the Congo, a number of strikes, labour disputes, student strikes, hunger strikes, and other industrial actions have occurred.

== Background ==
A labour strike is a work stoppage caused by the mass refusal of employees to work. This can include wildcat strikes, which are done without union authorisation, and slowdown strikes, where workers reduce their productivity while still carrying out minimal working duties. It is usually a response to employee grievances, such as low pay or poor working conditions. Strikes can also occur to demonstrate solidarity with workers in other workplaces or pressure governments to change policies.

== 20th century ==
=== 1980s ===
- 1980 Zaire students' strike

=== 1990s ===
- 1991 Zaire unrest, including strikes, against the dictatorship of Mobutu Sese Seko.
- Dead City Strike, general strike in Zaire against the government of Mobutu Sese Seko.
