= Military ranks of Zaire =

The Military ranks of Zaire were the military insignia used by the Zairian Armed Forces. The ranks are based on the Belgian military ranks, with additional influence from France and the United States. Following the overthrow of Mobutu Sese Seko, the ranks were replaced by the military ranks of the Democratic Republic of the Congo.

== Commissioned officer ranks ==
The rank insignia of commissioned officers.

Rank group	General / flag officers					Senior officers			Junior officers
Zairian Army
Zairian Army	Maréchal	Général d'armée	Général de corps d'armée	Général de division	Général de brigade	Colonel	Lieutenant-colonel	Major	Capitaine	Lieutenant	Sous-lieutenant
Zairian Navy
Zairian Navy		Grand amiral	Amiral	Vice-amiral	Contre-amiral	Capitaine de vaisseau	Capitaine de frégate	Capitaine de corvette	Lieutenant de vaisseau	Enseigne de vaisseau	Enseigne de vaisseau de deuxième classe
Zairian Air Force
Zairian Air Force		Général d'armée aérienne	Général de corps d'armée aérienne	Général de division aérienne	Général de brigade aérienne	Colonel	Lieutenant-colonel	Major	Capitaine	Lieutenant	Sous-lieutenant
Rank group	General / flag officers					Senior officers			Junior officers

== Other ranks ==
The rank insignia of non-commissioned officers and enlisted personnel.

Rank group	Senior NCOs							Junior NCOs	Enlisted
Zairian Army										No insignia
Zairian Army	Adjudant-chef	Adjudant de première classe	Adjudant	Premier sergent major	Sergent major	Premier sergent	Sergent	Caporal	Soldat de première classe	Soldat de seconde classe	Recrue
Zairian Navy										No insignia
Zairian Navy	Maître Chef Principal	Premier Maître Chef	Maître Chef	Premier Maître	Second Maître	Maître	Quartier Maître	Premier Matelot	Second Matelot	Matelot	Recrue
Zairian Air Force										No insignia
Zairian Air Force	Adjudant-chef	Adjudant de première classe	Adjudant	Premier sergent major	Sergent major	Premier sergent	Sergent	Caporal	Soldat de première classe	Soldat de seconde classe	Recrue
Rank group	Senior NCOs							Junior NCOs	Enlisted

== See also ==
- Military ranks of Republic of the Congo
- Military ranks of the Democratic Republic of the Congo
