= Military ranks of the Democratic Republic of the Congo =

List of ranks

The Military ranks of the Democratic Republic of the Congo are the military insignia used by the Armed Forces of the Democratic Republic of the Congo.

== Commissioned officer ranks ==
The rank insignia of commissioned officers.

Rank group	General / flag officers				Senior officers			Junior officers
Land Forces of the DR Congo
Land Forces of the DR Congo	Général d'armée	Lieutenant-général	Général-major	Général de brigade	Colonel	Lieutenant-colonel	Major	Capitaine	Lieutenant	Sous-lieutenant
Navy of the DR Congo
Navy of the DR Congo	Grand amiral	Amiral	Vice-amiral	Contre-amiral	Capitaine de vaisseau	Capitaine de frégate	Capitaine de corvette	Lieutenant de vaisseau	Enseigne de vaisseau	Enseigne de vaisseau de 2^{e} classe
Air Force of the DR Congo
Air Force of the DR Congo	Général d'armée	Lieutenant-général	Général-major	Général de brigade	Colonel	Lieutenant-colonel	Major	Capitaine	Lieutenant	Sous-Lieutenant
Rank group	General / flag officers				Senior officers			Junior officers

== Other ranks ==
The rank insignia of non-commissioned officers and enlisted personnel.

Rank group	Senior NCOs							Junior NCOs	Enlisted
Land Forces of the DR Congo										No insignia
Land Forces of the DR Congo	Adjudant-chef	Adjudant de première classe	Adjudant	Premier sergent major	Sergent major	Premier sergent	Sergent	Caporal	Soldat de première classe	Soldat de seconde classe	Recrue
Navy of the DR Congo										No insignia
Navy of the DR Congo	Maître chef principal	Premier maître chef	Maître chef	Premier maître	Second maître	Maître	Quartier maître	Premier matelot	Second matelot	Matelot	Recrue
Air Force of the DR Congo										No insignia
Air Force of the DR Congo	Adjudant-chef	Adjudant de première classe	Adjudant	Premier sergent major	Sergent major	Premier sergent	Sergent	Caporal	Soldat de première classe	Soldat de seconde classe	Recrue
Rank group	Senior NCOs							Junior NCOs	Enlisted

== See also ==
- Military ranks of Zaire
