= Battle of Kisangani (1997) =

Part of the First Congo War

- Part of the First Congo War
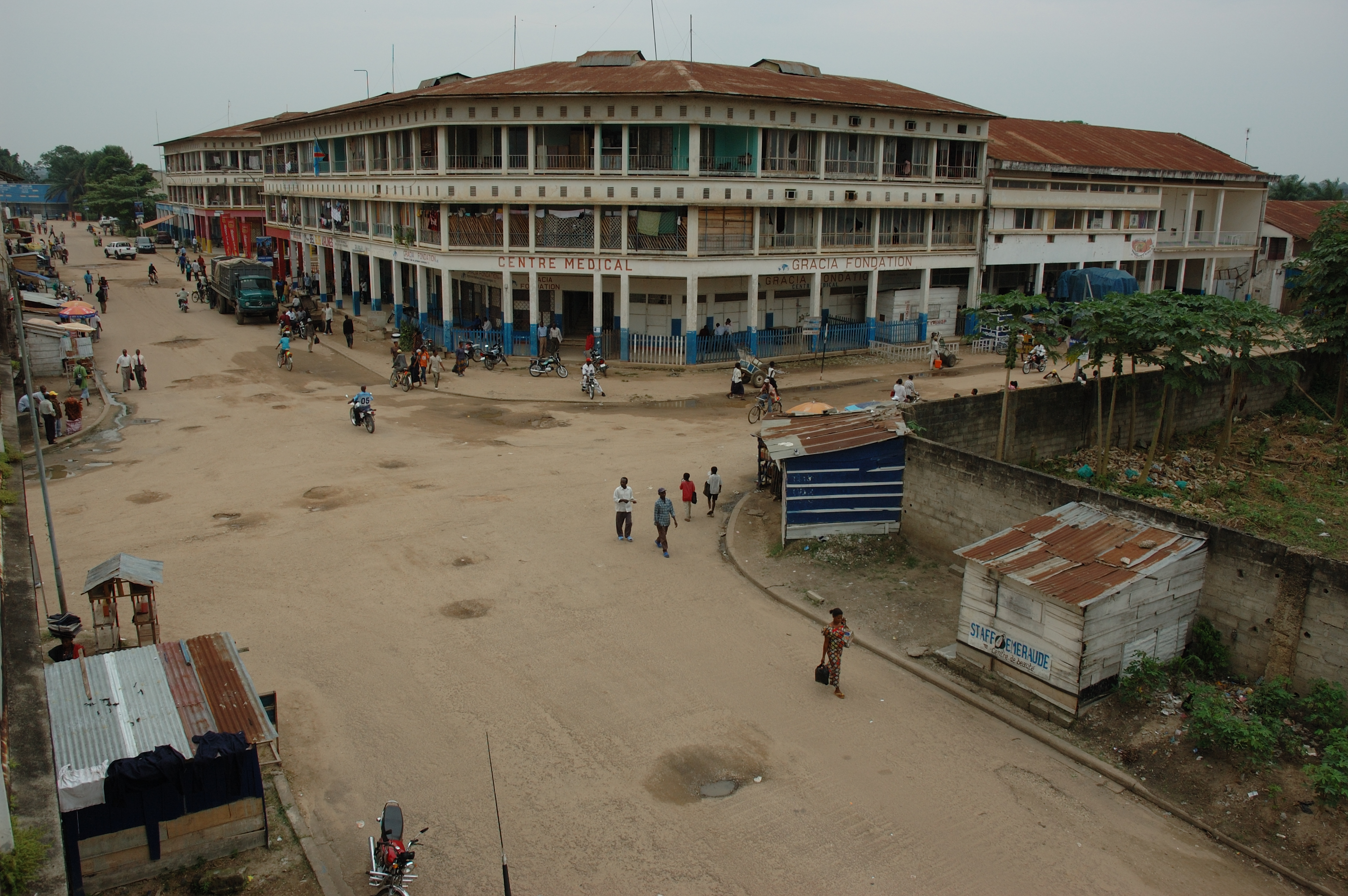
- City of Kisangani, 2006
Date	March 13 to 15, 1997
Location	Kisangani, Zaire (today Democratic Republic of the Congo)
Result	Rebel victory: Mobutu Sese Seko is ousted from power; Zaire is renamed to the Democratic Republic of the Congo

Belligerents
Zaire; Interahamwe; UNITA; White Legion	(Democratic Republic of the Congo) AFDL; Rwanda; Angola

Commanders and leaders
Mahele Lieko Bokungu	Laurent-Désiré Kabila; Joseph Kabila; James Kabarebe

The Battle of Kisangani took place in March 1997 during the First Congo War. The rebels of the Alliance of Democratic Forces for the Liberation of Congo (AFDL), supported by the Rwandan Patriotic Front, took the city defended by the Zairian Armed Forces (FAZ) which was loyal to President Mobutu Sese Seko.

Before the battle itself, the air force, Serbian mercenaries and Rwandan Hutu militiamen were not enough to make up for the FAZ's lack of fighting spirit. After a few timid Zairian offensives in January 1997, the rebels commanded by James Kabarebe arrived in the vicinity of the town of Kisangani. Between March 1 and 10, the AFDL's advance was blocked, with both sides suffering losses. On the 14th, a general rebel assault put Mobutist cadres and soldiers to flight, with the latter looting the region as they retreated. Several hundred Rwandan Hutu refugees were killed by the rebels in the weeks that followed. The battle marked the FAZ's inevitable defeat at the hands of Laurent Désiré Kabila's troops, who took Kinshasa in May 1997.

== Status ==
Map of Zaire in January 1997. The eastern towns are controlled by the AFDL, while the Zairian army plans to launch an offensive from Kisangani and Kindu.

Kisangani, in eastern Zaire, is the third-largest city in the country. Since October 1996 and the capture of Bukavu, the rebels, initially Banyamulenge supported by Rwandan soldiers, have been advancing from the African Great Lakes region. Kisangani is the gateway to western Zaire and the capital Kinshasa. Having taken economic control of part of Zaire, Rwandan troops now set their sights on pursuing the Hutus linked to the Tutsi genocide in Rwanda and who had taken refuge in Zaire. For their part, the FAZ planned from November 1996 to launch an offensive from the town of Kindu – south of Kisangani – in order to retake the east of the country.

=== Zairean forces ===
One of the J-21 Jastreb attack aircraft flown by Serbian mercenaries

In early 1997, Kisangani became the headquarters of the FAZ led by General Mahele Lieko Bokungu in their fight against the rebels. The FAZ units in the city were made up of the remnants of the 31st parachute brigade, two battalions of the 41st brigade, civil guard units supported by several units of the military action and intelligence service, and the 48th independent battalion. By January 1997, the total number of troops had risen to between 3,000 and 4,000, deployed for "the great lightning offensive", according to Zairean announcements.

The Zairians were reinforced by 6,000 Rwandan Hutu Interahamwe or former members of the Rwandan armed forces (FAR), who fled to Zaire after the Rwandan genocide, as well as Angolan UNITA fighters In Wania Rukula, 64 kilometers from Kisangani, soldiers from the Special Presidential Division (DSP, after the original French Division Spéciale Présidentielle) distributed weapons to a thousand newly arrived Hutu refugees.

Bosnian Serb mercenaries, commanded by Colonel Dominic Yugo, were recruited to reinforce the FAZ, in a unit nicknamed the White Legion. They were equipped with three Mi-24 helicopters and three J-21 Jastreb attack aircraft, and also formed an infantry company.

However, the Zairians were demoralized and only the ex-FAR fighters were ready to fight. The Serbian mercenaries, having lost three of their men during a reconnaissance operation, lost much of their motivation and were particularly noted for their abuses against civilians. Similarly, the defense system is based on landmines, making it difficult to adapt to Rwandan-Congolese maneuvers.

=== Rebels ===
Kabila's forces, led by Rwandan general James Kabarebe, number around 6,000 men.

The AFDL rebels are supported by soldiers from the Rwandan Patriotic Army (APR). The presence of officers from the Uganda People's Defence Force (UPDF) is less certain. Commanded by Stany Kalala and Gaston Munyangu, 500 to 2,000 Katangese Tigers incorporated into the 24th regiment of the Angolan army also joined the rebel troops, bringing heavy artillery, Stalin organs and armor to the AFDL/APR forces. The rebels also recruited large numbers of local fighters, many of them child soldiers known as kadogos.

== City headquarters ==
In view of the advance of Kabila's troops in eastern Zaire, in early 1997 the FAZ launched two counter-attacks from Kisangani towards Bafwasende and Walikale, with the battalion's forces of order (500 to 700 men). They were defeated between January 20 and 25, 1997.

The 2,000 FAZ soldiers garrisoned in Kindu deserted the town after looting it, leaving only a few ex-FAR soldiers to defend it. The town was taken between February 27 and March 2, after some sporadic fighting.

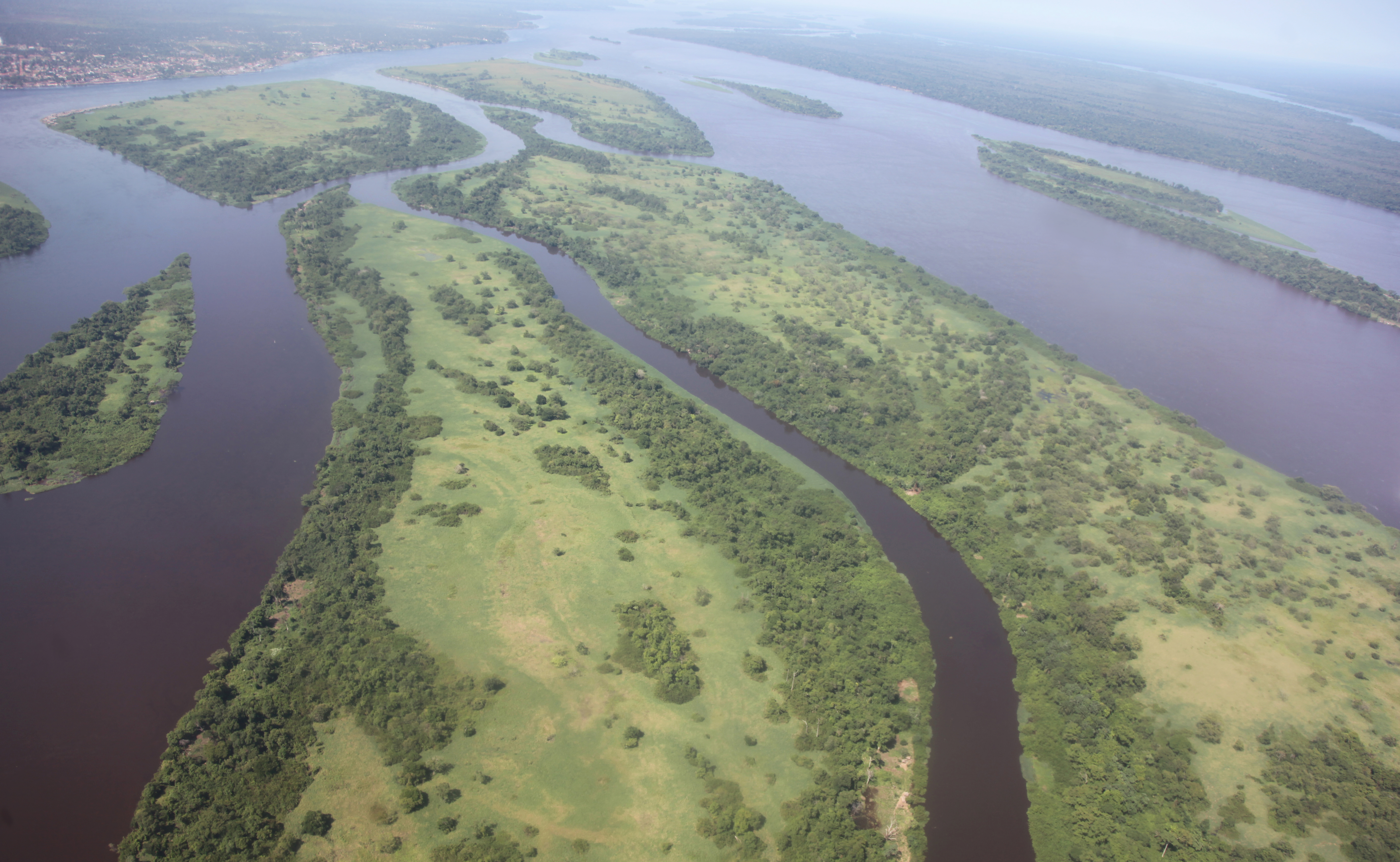
Aerial view of the Congo River near Kisangani. The river was used as a natural line of defense by the Zairians.

Kisangani was surrounded for several weeks, with the front line forming an arc around the city. On the FAZ side, the Rwandan Hutu militiamen were the only ones really fighting, and almost 500 of them lost their lives in the fighting preceding the final assault. The rebels failed to cross the Congo River, blocked by the mercenaries' effective fire. According to an interview with James Karabe published after his break with Kabila, the AFDL leader suggested that the rebels hide in tree tops to scare off the mercenaries. Another legend about the fighting is that the Katangese Tigers tried to cross the river protected by a magic ritual and suffered very heavy losses.

On March 10, the 48th Battalion successfully ambushed AFDL/APR forces on the road to Bafwasende. The mercenaries launched a frontal assault that pushed the rebels back 5 km

Although the rebels were expected to take the town, on March 12 Prime Minister Kengo wa Dondo continued to deny reports that the town was close to collapse.

== Assault and takeover of the city ==
On March 13, FAZ/ex-FAR troops in position at Babagulu, 48 km east of the town, were defeated after being surrounded by rebels guided by the population. In the late afternoon of the 14th, the rebels made their final attack, preceded by the Angolan armored vehicles of the Katangese. The 31st Brigade routed towards the Kisangani-Bangoka airport. The Serbian mercenaries opened fire on the Zairian soldiers, who tried to escape in the planes and helicopters parked at the airport. According to some official Zairian statements, the soldiers of the 31st brigade changed sides, a fact denied by the rebels.

The Zairian generals left the town on the 14th, while the soldiers looted the town on the morning of the 14th and 15th before fleeing. The mercenaries fled Zaire after leaving the airport in 14. The rebels waited several hours before entering the town, giving the soldiers time to flee. Thousands of panic-stricken people tried to cross the Congo river, but the Rwandans' entry was generally welcomed by the inhabitants.

On the morning of the 15th, a French military Transall aircraft landed at the town's old airport to evacuate expatriates still present in the town. Mid-afternoon on the 15th, Mobutu officially acknowledged the fall of the city. According to Joseph Kabila, son of Laurent Désiré Kabila and commander on the ground, 260 FAZ soldiers surrendered to the rebels, while only two rebel fighters were killed.

Banner unfurled by local residents on March 18

== Consequences ==
The departure of the Mobututists was seen as a liberation by the inhabitants of the town, marked by the memory of Patrice Lumumba, father of Congolese independence, who was arrested by Mobutu and assassinated in 1960. They took up the cry "Uhuru", meaning freedom in Swahili. Arriving at the city's airport on March 21, 1997, Kabila was acclaimed by the population.

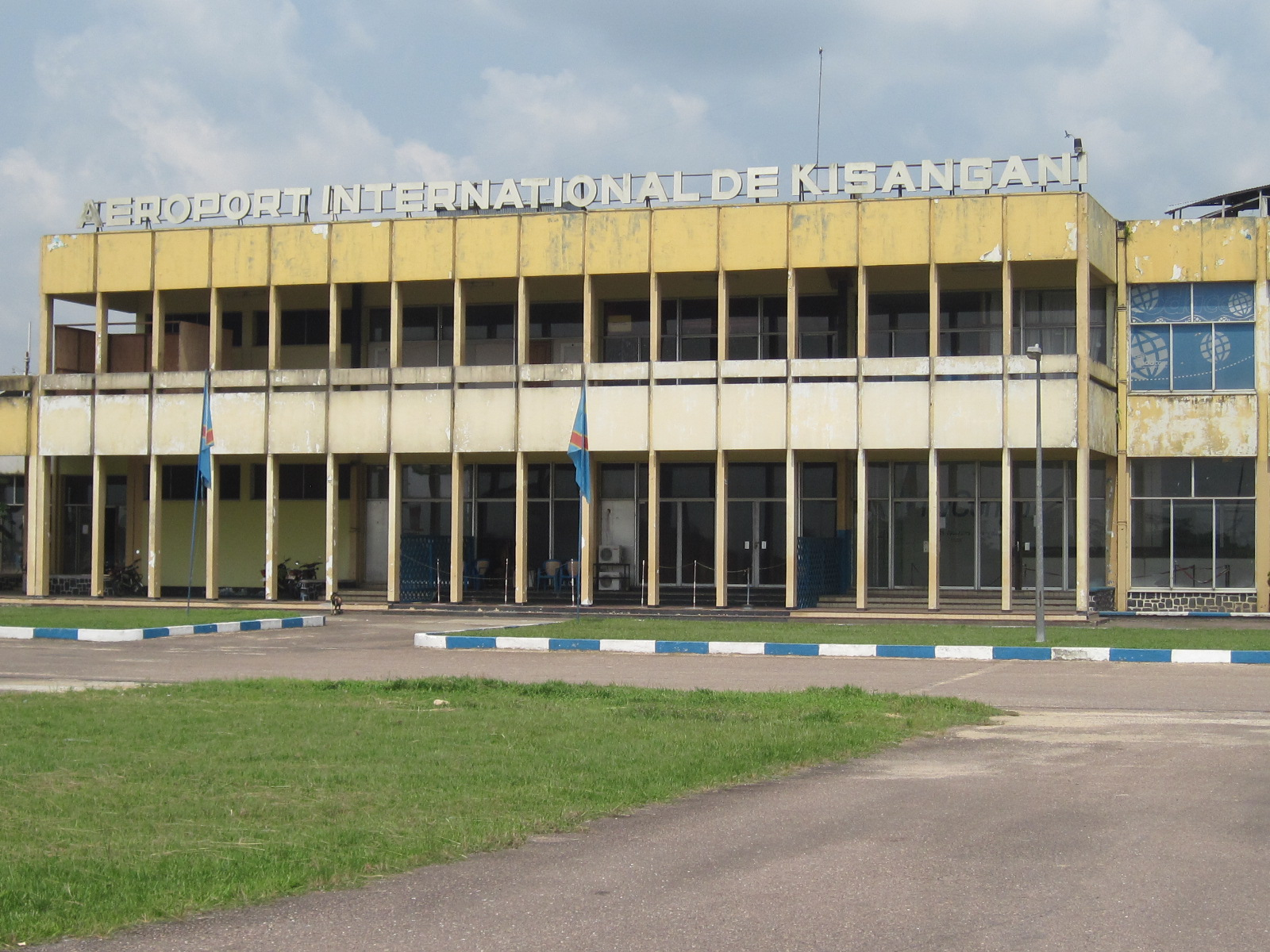
Bangoka airport, seen here in 2017, was used to refuel Rwandan-Congolese offensives after the battle.

Kisangani, in the eastern part of the country, was the first major city to succumb to rebel forces. The involvement of Rwandan and Angolan soldiers with heavy equipment marked the transition from a local insurgency to a regional conflict. The control of Bangoka and Simisini airports facilitated the supply of foreign armies. For its part, the Zairian general staff had to admit the failure of its counter-offensive, losing many stocks of military equipment. The myth of European military invincibility in Africa was shattered: the costly recruitment of foreign mercenaries proved ineffective.

The battle was a turning point in the Zairian conflict. The fall of the city weakened Mobutu's position vis-à-vis Kabila. Kabila was seen as the key to resolving the conflict in the Congo. An AFDL delegation was invited to the Organization of African Unity in Lomé on March 22, 1997. Although Mobutu had previously refused to talk to Kabila, he called for negotiations. Prime Minister Kengo wa Dondo was dismissed by the Zairian parliament on March 18 after the fall of the city. Under pressure from the French and Americans, Mobutu called on his long-time opponent, Étienne Tshisekedi, to head a government of national unity, which excluded the Mobututists. From a position of strength, Kabila opposed any ceasefire without Mobutu's departure, and refused to join the government. The capture of Kisangani was soon followed by that of Lubumbashi in Katanga, enabling the AFDL's final push towards Kinshasa and the collapse of the Mobutu regime, which had ruled the country unchallenged for over thirty years.

Rwandan refugee movement and successive massacres

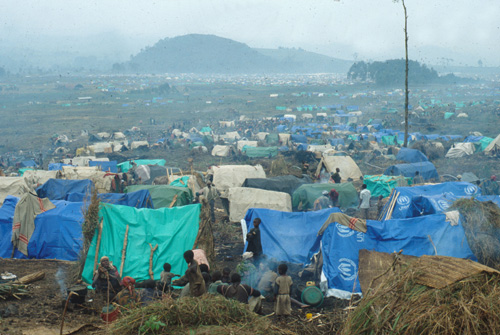
Rwandan refugee camp in eastern Zaire in 1994

In Wane-Rugula (on the east bank of the Zaire river), at least 470 Hutus were killed by rebel fighters at 8 p.m. on March 14. A few dozen refugees are massacred by the rebels as they enter Kisangani. Refugees from Wane-Rugula flee and cross into Zaire via Ubundu territory (south of Kisangani). Some of them, notably the ex-FAR, headed for Équateur province, while others sought to reach the safety of Kisangani. The AFDL/APR blocked their progress towards Kisangani, and the refugees settled between Kisangani and Ubundu. The two camps of Kaese I and II housed 50,000 people, while 30,000 refugees joined the Biaro camp. Access was extremely difficult for humanitarian organizations and, by April, around a hundred people were dying every day due to poor living conditions. Several hundred refugees were massacred by the local population and the AFDL/APR in the months that followed.

== See also ==
- James Kabarebe
- AFDL
- Armed Forces of the Democratic Republic of the Congo#Zaire 1971–1997
- Mobutu Sese Seko
- Rwandan genocide
- First Congo War
- Second Congo War
- Lusaka Ceasefire Agreement
