= Eluki Monga Aundu =

Congolese military officer (1941–2022)

- Born: 6 April 1941; Kinshasa, Belgian Congo
- Died: 8 September 2022 (aged 81); Brussels, Belgium
- Allegiance: Zaire
- Service / branch: Land Forces
- Years of service: 1965–1996
- Rank: General de division
- Commands: Chief of Staff of the Armed Forces

Eluki Monga Aundu (6 April 1941 – 8 September 2022) was a Congolese military officer who achieved the rank of general.

== Biography ==
Monga earned degrees in humanities and social sciences from the École interarmes in Belgium. In 1965, he became platoon school commander in Kitona, where he stayed for five years. He then became a military attaché to the Union of Central African States in 1970 and subsequently charged with organization, instruction, and operation of the staff of the Zairan Armed Forces as a lieutenant colonel. From 1975 to 1976, he was commander of the Special Presidential Division.

From 1976 to 1977, Monga was chief of staff for President Mobutu Sese Seko and promoted to the rank of general. He became Secretary of State for National Defense, serving from 1979 to 1981. From 1988 to 1992, he was ambassador of Zaire to Israel, where he took part in the Sovereign National Conference as a guest. From 1993 to 1996, he served as chief of general staff of the Zairian Armed Forces, succeeding Donatien Mahele Lieko Bokungu. After the start of the First Congo War, he was replaced by Kpama Baramoto Kata.

Monga died in Brussels on 8 September 2022, at the age of 81.
