= Dieudonné Kayembe =

Congolese general (born 1945)

Dieudonné Kayembe Mbandakulu Tshisuma
- Born: 9 April 1945 (age 81); Élisabethville, Haut-Katanga District, Belgian Congo
- Education: École spéciale militaire de Saint-Cyr; United States Army Command and General Staff College
- Military career
- Allegiance: Zaire (to 1997); Democratic Republic of the Congo
- Branch: Land Forces
- Service years: –2013
- Rank: Lieutenant General
- Commands: Chief of Staff of the Armed Forces of the Democratic Republic of the Congo; DEMIAP
- Conflicts: Second Congo War; Kivu conflict; Operation Kimia

Lieutenant General Dieudonné Kayembe Mbandakulu Tshisuma (born 9 April 1945) is a retired Congolese military officer who last served as the Chief of Staff of the Armed Forces of the Democratic Republic of the Congo (FARDC) from 2007 to 2008.

Kayembe was born in Élisabethville, Belgian Congo (present-day Lubumbashi, DR Congo), and graduated from military academies in France, including Saint-Cyr. He later graduated from the U.S. Army Command and General Staff College. Kayembe's senior posts included as deputy minister of defense, deputy chief of staff of the military headquarters, and Director-General of the Military Detection of Unpatriotic Activities (DEMIAP), all held during the Second Congo War. As the FARDC chief of staff from 2007 to 2008, he planned Operation Kimia against the Rwandan FDLR militia during the Kivu conflict, and proposed a plan for the reform and professionalization of the armed forces. He was removed after the collapse of FARDC forces near Goma in late 2008 during an offensive by CNDP rebels.

== Early life and education ==
Dieudonné Kayembe Mbandakulu Tshisuma was born on 9 April 1945 at Élisabethville, Haut-Katanga District, Belgian Congo. He attended primary and secondary school Mbuji-Mayi. He joined the Congolese military at a young age and entered the École spéciale militaire de Saint-Cyr in France. After he finished that training, he was admitted to a branch school, specifically the Cavalry School at Saumur, France.

== Military career ==
Kayembe later studied at the United States Army Command and General Staff College, where he received a staff officer certificate. After returning from the United States, in March 1999 promoted to brigadier general and became deputy minister of defense, while President Laurent-Désiré Kabila served as defense minister. In 2001 or 2002 Kayembe became the deputy chief of staff of the military headquarters. During his time serving under chief of staff Sylvestre Lwetcha, he practically ran the Congolese Armed Forces (FAC). He was later made the Director-General of the Military Detection of Unpatriotic Activities (DEMIAP), the military intelligence agency. He was replaced as the head of military intelligence by Brig. Gen. Didier Etumba on 13 August 2003.

On 12 June 2007 Kayembe was appointed Chief of Staff of the Armed Forces of the Democratic Republic of the Congo and promoted to lieutenant general by President Joseph Kabila. He took command in a ceremony on 22 June 2007. On 1 August 2007, after four Ugandan soldiers were arrested on Rukwanzi Island for crossing the lake to the territory disputed by the DRC and Uganda, Kayembe said that their situation would be handled by the FARDC commander in Ituri. Kayembe visited Goma in September 2007 and called on members of Laurent Nkunda's rebel forces to join the FARDC's integration process, with the support of the UN Mission (MONUC). Following the November 2007 Nairobi agreement between the DRC and Rwanda, Kayembe and MONUC commander Babacar Gaye began working on a plan for a military operation against the Democratic Forces for the Liberation of Rwanda (FDLR), known as Operation Kimia.

In late 2007 and early 2008, there an intense power struggle between Kayembe and Congolese Minister of Defense and Veterans Chikez Diemu, who had competing plans for a defense reform plan of the FARDC. Kayembe proposed a plan that would create a downsized and more professional FARDC of 60,000 to 70,000 soldiers, half of its size at the time, with the goal of defending the country's borders and population. Chikez's proposal kept the army much larger and would put its main focus on contributing to reconstruction and achieving agricultural self-sufficiency, instead of defense. Kayembe, along with the leaders of MONUC and the EU advisory mission were graduates of Saint-Cyr, fueling a conspiracy theory that the "Saint-Cyriens" worked on the plan. Kayembe's proposal was considered better by most experts, but the Chikez plan was preferred by the government at the time.

Kayembe met with the Rwandan Defence Force (RDF) chief of staff, Gen. James Kabarebe, on 16 March 2008, which was convened at the request of Rwanda. They agreed to not support groups challenging their respective states, the FDLR and the National Congress for the Defence of the People (CNDP), respectively. On 20 August, he visited an army integration (brassage) center in Kisangani, where he deplored the poor sanitation and living conditions, and said he would make sure it is rehabilitated. On 7 September, he visited Rutshuru and Nyanzale to examine the situation during the fighting between the FARDC and the CNDP, with the FARDC having launched an offensive against the group on 28 August, as well as Operation Kimia. Within two months, the FARDC collapsed and the CNDP was approaching Goma as government troops abandoned the city. Kabila replaced Kayembe as chief of staff with Lt. Gen. Didier Etumba on 18 November 2008 after their indiscipline and low morale amidst the fighting with CNDP.

== Later life ==
An announcement of his retirement was made by Ordinance 13/082 of 13 July 2013.

== Citations ==
Military offices
Preceded by Damas Kabulo Mydia Vita	Director-General of the Military Detection of Unpatriotic Activities; 2002–2003	Succeeded by Didier Etumba as Chief of Staff of Military Intelligence
Preceded by Kisempia Sungilanga	Chief of Staff of the Armed Forces of the Democratic Republic of the Congo; 2007–2008	Succeeded by Didier Etumba
