= 1991 Zaire unrest =

Violent unrest in Zaire in 1991

Unrest in Zaire
- Part of the collapse of Zaire
- Date: September–October 1991
- Location: Several cities across Zaire
- Caused by: Government corruption; Unreliable and poor pay for most FAZ soldiers; Political repression; Economic crisis; Failure to implement promised reforms
- Goals: End of Mobutism; Improvement in pay for FAZ soldiers; Plunder; Overthrow of Mobutu Sese Seko
- Methods: Arson, demonstrations, mutiny, looting, rioting
- Result: Substantial damage to property, infrastructure, and Zaire's economy; Paratrooper training discontinued; Opposition leader Étienne Tshisekedi appointed as Prime Minister of Zaire, but fired after three weeks

Parties
(Zaire) Zairian government: FAZ loyalists; SARM; France; Belgium	FAZ mutineers Civilian protesters, including looters

Lead figures
Mobutu Sese Seko; Donatien Mahele Lieko Bokungu	No centralized leadership

Number
(Zaire) ? (including DSP, SARM) (France) 1,000 (Belgium) 1,100	Several brigades of mutineers Many civilians

Casualties and losses
- Deaths: 200+ Injuries: 1,250+

In September and October 1991, Zaire (modern-day Democratic Republic of the Congo) experienced substantial violent unrest, as several Zairian Armed Forces units mutinied and rioted, soon joined by civilian protesters and looters. While the revolting soldiers primarily demanded more reliable and higher wages and it remained unclear whether they had any political motives, many civilians demanded the end of President Mobutu Sese Seko's repressive and corrupt dictatorship. The unrest started in Zaire's capital Kinshasa, and quickly spread to other cities. Large-scale looting caused massive property and economic damage, but the unrest resulted in no clear political changes. Zaire remained locked in a political crisis until 1996–1997, when Mobutu was overthrown during the First Congo War.

== Background ==
=== Decline of Zaire ===
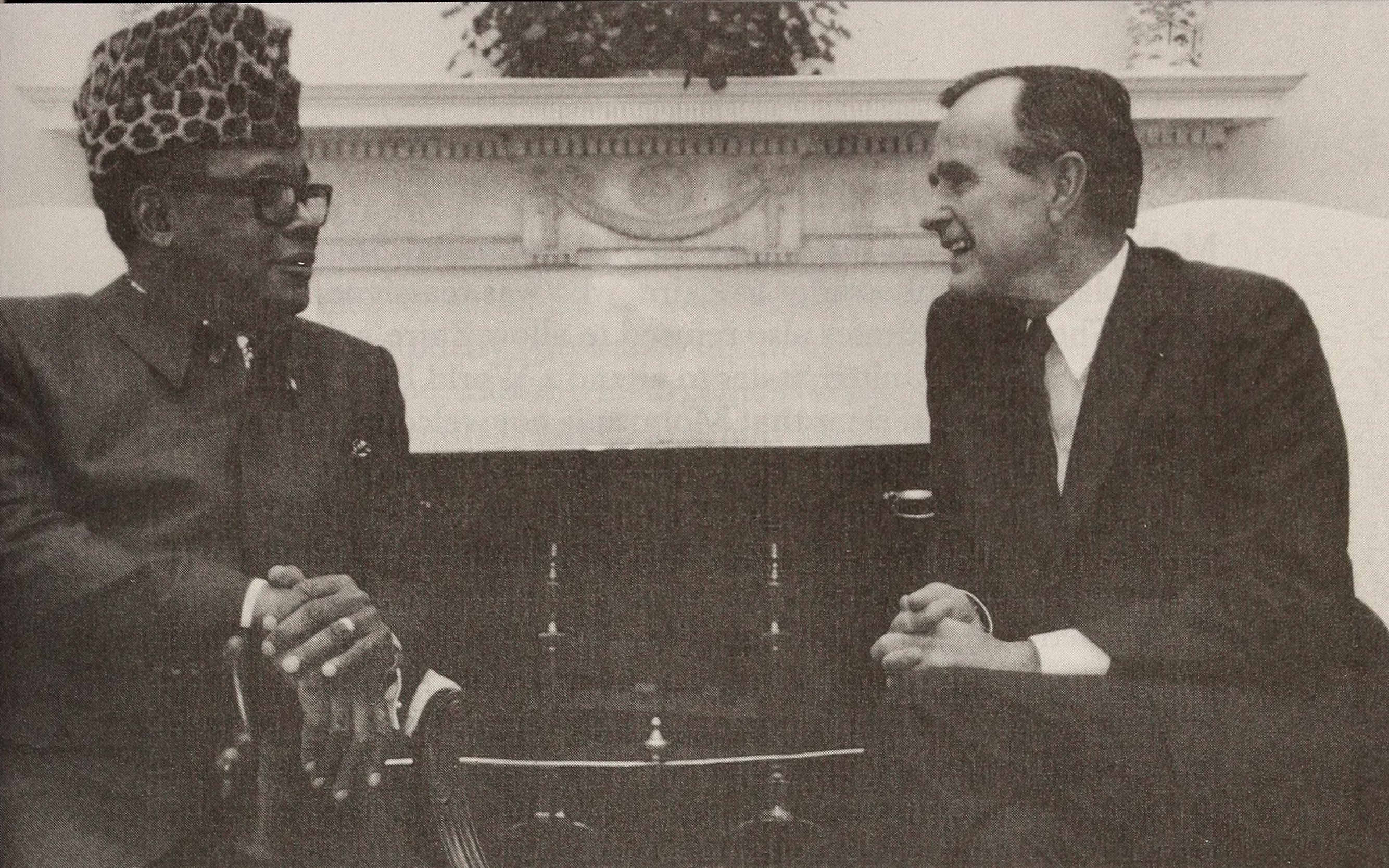
Mobutu Sese Seko, pictured with U.S. American President George H. W. Bush on a visit to the United States in 1989

As a result of the Congo Crisis of 1960–1965, army commander Mobutu Sese Seko seized power in the newly independent Congo, renaming the country to "Zaire" in 1972 and running it as his "poorly managed private estate" for 32 years. The Congolese National Army (Armée Nationale Congolaise) and its successor, the Zairian Armed Forces (Forces Armées Zaïroises, FAZ) were one of his main pillars of support. Mobutu established a totalitarian military dictatorship and initially presided over a period of economic growth. His government portrayed its policies as populist and spent much money on economic as well as food subsidies, earning substantial goodwill by the population. However, his rule ultimately proved to be "one of the most catastrophic examples of dictatorship" in African history. He embezzled billions of US$, spent large sums on idiosyncratic projects and for his lavish lifestyle, while developing a country-wide system of patronage which encouraged extreme corruption and graft. The Zairian security forces violently suppressed any opposition. From 1974, the Zairian economy began to noticeably struggle due to changes in the world economy, misgovernment, and corruption; however, Mobutu was able to keep his government afloat thanks to extensive loans by his international supporters like the United States. The Western world regarded him as a reliable and strategic anti-Communist ally in the Cold War.

By the 1980s, Zaire suffered from growing internal strife and economic decline. Many Zairians had become resentful of Mobutu's repressive and corrupt dictatorship, while the FAZ suffered from chronic mismanagement and failures to properly pay the troops. In the early 1980s, the President attempted to improve the training, equipment, and logistics of the FAZ. These initiatives were undermined by tribalism, corruption, and Mobutu's own desire to prevent potential rivals from gaining power. Pay remained so unreliable and poor that most soldiers had to rely on "licensed brigandage" to make a living, and Mobutu accordingly called his own army "The Seventh Scourge". When his initial attempts at military reforms failed, the President just stopped trying and left the situation be for the rest of the 1980s. In addition to these internal developments, Zaire was also one of many Sub-Saharan countries which were forced to reduce military spending in the 1980s, as the Cold War blocs headed by the United States and Soviet Union reduced their financial support for African countries during this decade. This caused dissatisfaction to rise in several African militaries, with many soldiers experiencing delays and reduction in pay as well as worsening living standards. Ultimately this would lead to a greater willingness to mutiny in the militaries across Sub-Saharan Africa.

By the late 1980s, the Special Presidential Division (Division Spéciale Présidentielle; DSP) were reportedly the "only operational troops" of the FAZ. Mostly recruited from Mobutu's ethnic group, the Ngbandi, the DSP was generally favored and provided with the best equipment. In 1989, the President ordered all heavy weaponry to be handed over to the DSP. Despite his misgovernment, Mobutu remained firmly in power in the 1980s due to support by the Western world. Accordingly, Zaire only began to unravel with the collapse of the Eastern Bloc, as this removed Mobutu's justification of his dictatorship.

=== Announcement of reforms and the CNS ===
Mobutu realized that the political situation was changing due to the Cold War's end, an impression furthered by the overthrow and execution of his friend Nicolae Ceaușescu, dictator of Romania, in December 1989. Mobutu decided to tour Zaire in January and February 1990. As he had previously surrounded himself with "sycophants", the tour "rude[ly]" exposed him to the considerable level of popular discontent in the country. The country suffered under hyperinflation, (Note: Inflation grew from 56% in 1989 to 256% in 1990 and 4,000% in 1991.) mass unemployment, and generally low income; many people in the cities could only buy one meal a day; in many parts of the country, 50% of the population was malnourished. Realizing the need to do something, Mobutu announced the start of political reforms on 24 April 1990. He proclaimed a "Third Republic" with a free press, the end of Authenticité, the introduction of multiparty politics, and the handover of power to a democratically elected government within a year. Long-time opposition leader Étienne Tshisekedi was released from house arrest. However, the announcement of reforms caused immediate political agitation of excited Zairians. The opposition organized demonstrations, scaring Mobutu, who had intended to remain in control despite the changes. He ordered a violent crackdown on protests, and when the DSP was sent to suppress unrest at the University of Lubumbashi, the operation resulted in the deaths of dozens of students.

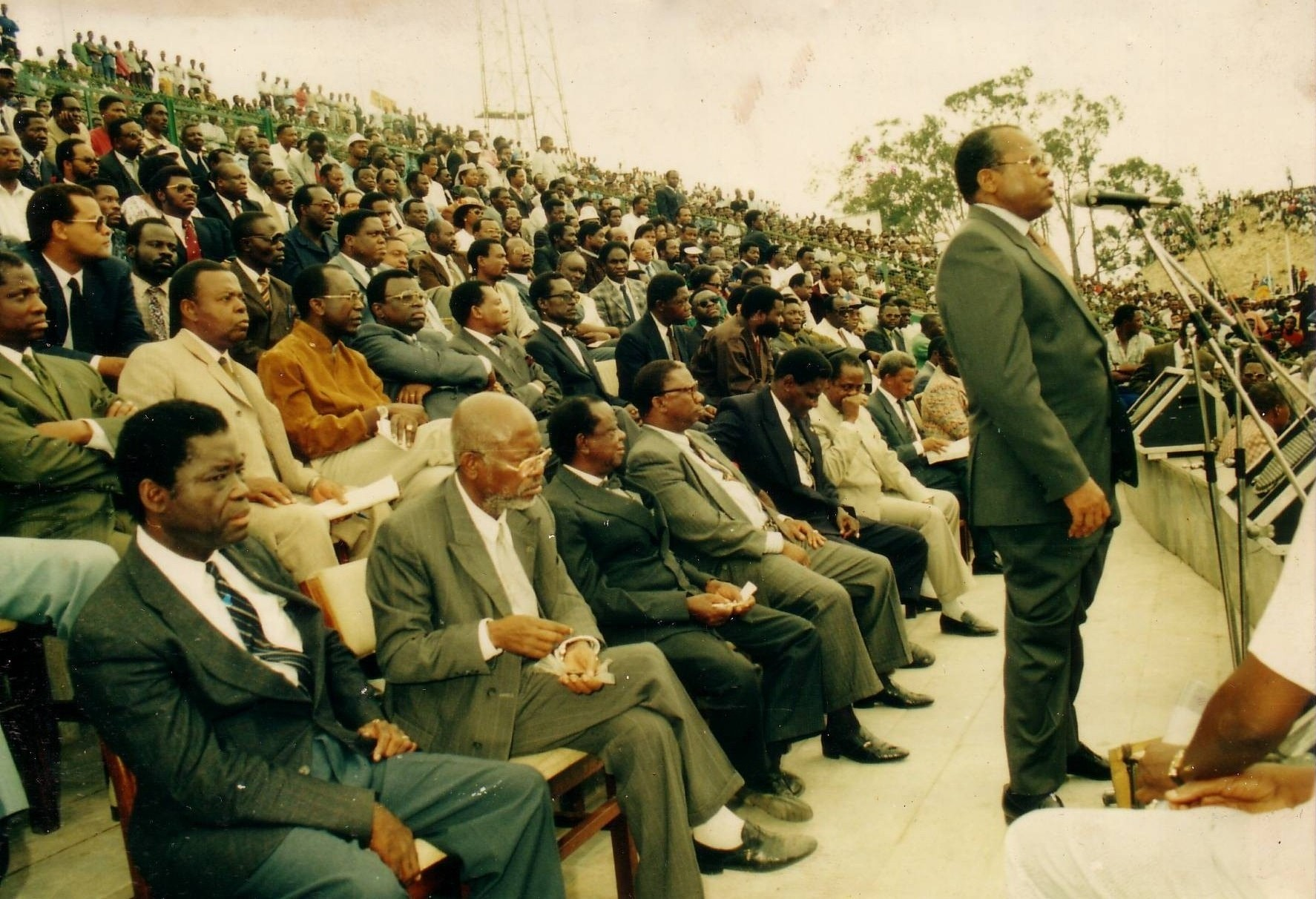
A newly founded opposition alliance meets in 1991. Étienne Tshisekedi speaks from a microphone at the right.

The action caused international outrage, and even Mobutu's long-time allies such as the United States and Belgium finally pressured him to implement actual change. To appease the demonstrators, the government almost trebled the wages of civil servants in October 1990, even though it could not sustain this move due to the struggling economy. Mobutu also legalized the establishment of new parties in December 1990, while continuing to crack down on ongoing demonstrations. As the chaotic political and security situation made elections difficult to organize, the President organized the Conférence Nationale Souveraine (CNS) on 7 August 1991. This conference was supposed to discuss and prepare for political reforms. However, Mobutu continued to undermine the democratization. Most importantly, he invited so many political parties to the conference as to make it unmanageable. (Note: Mobutu had always tried to justify limiting the number of legal parties in Zaire by claiming that the country's high diversity would result in political splintering and factionalism. After allowing the foundation of new parties in 1990, the country indeed experienced an explosion in party numbers with around 300 by 1991. Some parties consisted of a single individual. However, Mobutu ended up supporting this process by paying citizens to found their own parties, hoping to exploit the factionalism even before the CNS's start.) Overall, the CNS included 2,800 delegates from across the country. Just before the conference started, a government official handed out money in front of the Palais du Peuple to all delegates who were willing to found a new party on the spot and promise to support Mobutu. The opposition accordingly accused the President of filling the conference with his own followers. Mobutu also appointed Kalonji Mutambayi as the CNS's chairman; Mutambayi was elderly, half-deaf, and a government loyalist. Mobutu's plan worked, and the CNS disintegrated. As the conference broke up without having set a date for the promised elections or implementing any actual changes, however, public frustration escalated in Zaire's capital Kinshasa.

== Crisis ==
=== September unrest and French-Belgian interventions ===
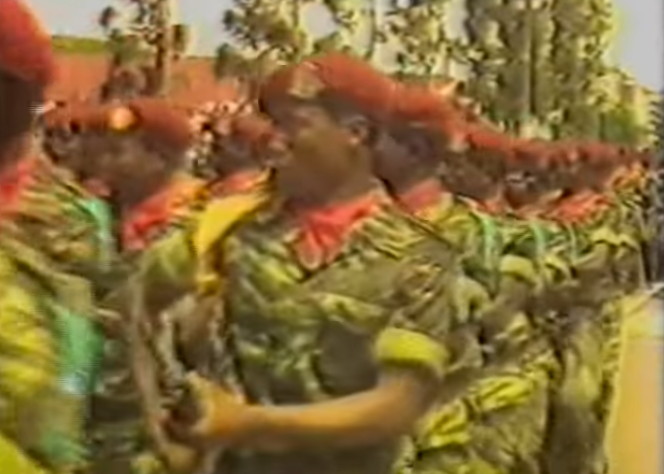
Soldiers of the 31st Zairian Parachute Brigade (pictured 1985)

On 22 September or 23 September 1991, about 3,000 paratroopers of the 31st Zairian Parachute Brigade mutinied at their base in Ndjili at Kinshasa's outskirts. They had not been paid for months, and initially demanded their back pay as well as higher wages. It remained unclear whether the mutinying soldiers had any political motives. The paratroopers marched from their base and occupied N'djili Airport where they seized a supply depot and disabled the control tower.

The mutineers then moved into the capital's center using military vehicles, storming shops, gas stations, department stores, and private homes. They took all moveable items of value, including television sets, refrigerators, and photocopiers. The paratroopers first concentrated on the main street, June 30 Boulevard, and later expanded their looting into the Mbinza and Gombe neighborhoods. Many rioting troops got drunk. Other FAZ soldiers in Kinshasa as well as civilians from the city's southern slums soon joined the "orgy of pillaging", specifically targeting anything representing Mobutism such as government offices, but also foreigner-owned houses and companies. Civilians also plundered the supermarkets, and began dismantling entire establishments, taking kitchen sinks, toilets, fabric of buildings, steels girders, and other material, even if they could not realistically use it or sell it. The so-called "Industrial Limete", an area along the Zaire River dominated by factories, was largely destroyed as rioters stole most of the machinery there. At a General Motors plant near the airport, the soldiers stole hundreds of cars, followed by civilian looters taking the machines, walls, floor, roof, and cables in the ground, eventually leaving only a "skeleton of steel girders". The 31st Parachute Brigade also started to clash with the unpopular DSP, but the latter also began to loot the city instead of suppressing the mutiny. Historian David Van Reybrouck characterized the extensive looting as reaction to the corruption of the Zairian government; the common people saw themselves as finally able to do what the ruling elite had done in their eyes for decades: steal everything.

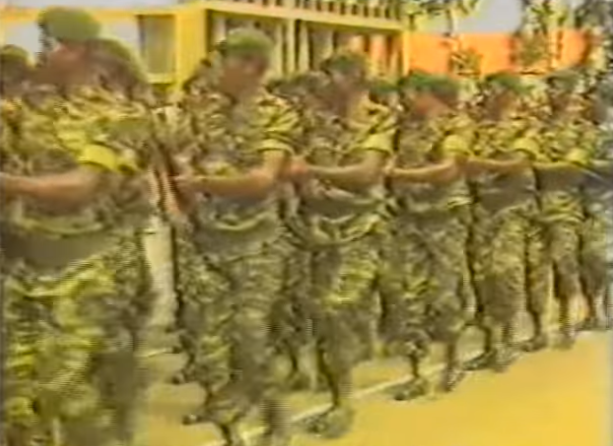
Zairian commandos (pictured 1985) rioted in Kisangani

The unrest quickly spread to other FAZ units in other parts of the country such as the 41st Commando Brigade in Kisangani. These troops also began to riot and loot. Mobutu did little to stop the chaos. He moved to his yacht in the Zaire River, and requested support from the French and Belgian governments. The two countries agreed to send aid, officially to help evacuation efforts and to protect embassies. The two countries were also motivated by their wish to maintain some influence in Zaire. The Zairian opposition protested against a foreign intervention, instead proposing a "public salvation government" with Étienne Tshisekedi as Prime Minister of Zaire to bring the situation back under control.

Mobutu also ordered General Donatien Mahele Lieko Bokungu to restore order, using a contingent of soldiers belonging to the DSP and Zairian Military Intelligence Bureau (Service d'Action et de Renseignement Militaire, SARM). Mahele had been a paratrooper commander until 1990, when Mobutu had transferred him to command of a DSP unit out of fear that he was becoming too popular among his troops. Mahele knew the rioting soldiers, and they still respected him. Accordingly, when Mahele called the mutineers to stop their looting, many heeded his calls. The French ambassador assisted in negotiating with the mutineers. Meanwhile, foreigners fled the country en masse or were evacuated. Even though the rioting soldiers plundered the houses of many expatriates, they generally refrained from physically harming foreign civilians.

On 23 September, France launched Operation Baumier. The French Air Force sent a first detachment of soldiers who had been stationed in the Central African Republic to Kinshasa, landing at N'djili Airport after it had been secured by SARM troops commanded by Mahele. A detachment of the 2nd Foreign Infantry Regiment which had been stationed in Chad followed suit. The Belgians launched Operation Blue Beam on the next day, landing troops of the Para Commando Regiment in Congo-Brazzaville and ferrying them across the Zaire River to Kinshasa. Together with the DSP and SARM, the French and Belgians secured the capital, whereupon Belgium brought in more troops as part of Operation Kir, this time using the N'Dolo Airport. The United States provided logistical support and transport planes. Overall, France and Belgium sent 1,000 and 1,100 soldiers respectively to Zaire. Although denying that they would "prop up" the Zairian government, French and Belgian units proved crucial in restoring order. Mahele also moved against the mutineers who refused to stop pillaging, and even ordered his loyalist forces to open fire on paratroopers who had previously served under him, killing several. On 24 September, Kinshasa Radio claimed that the mutineers had been evicted from the capital.

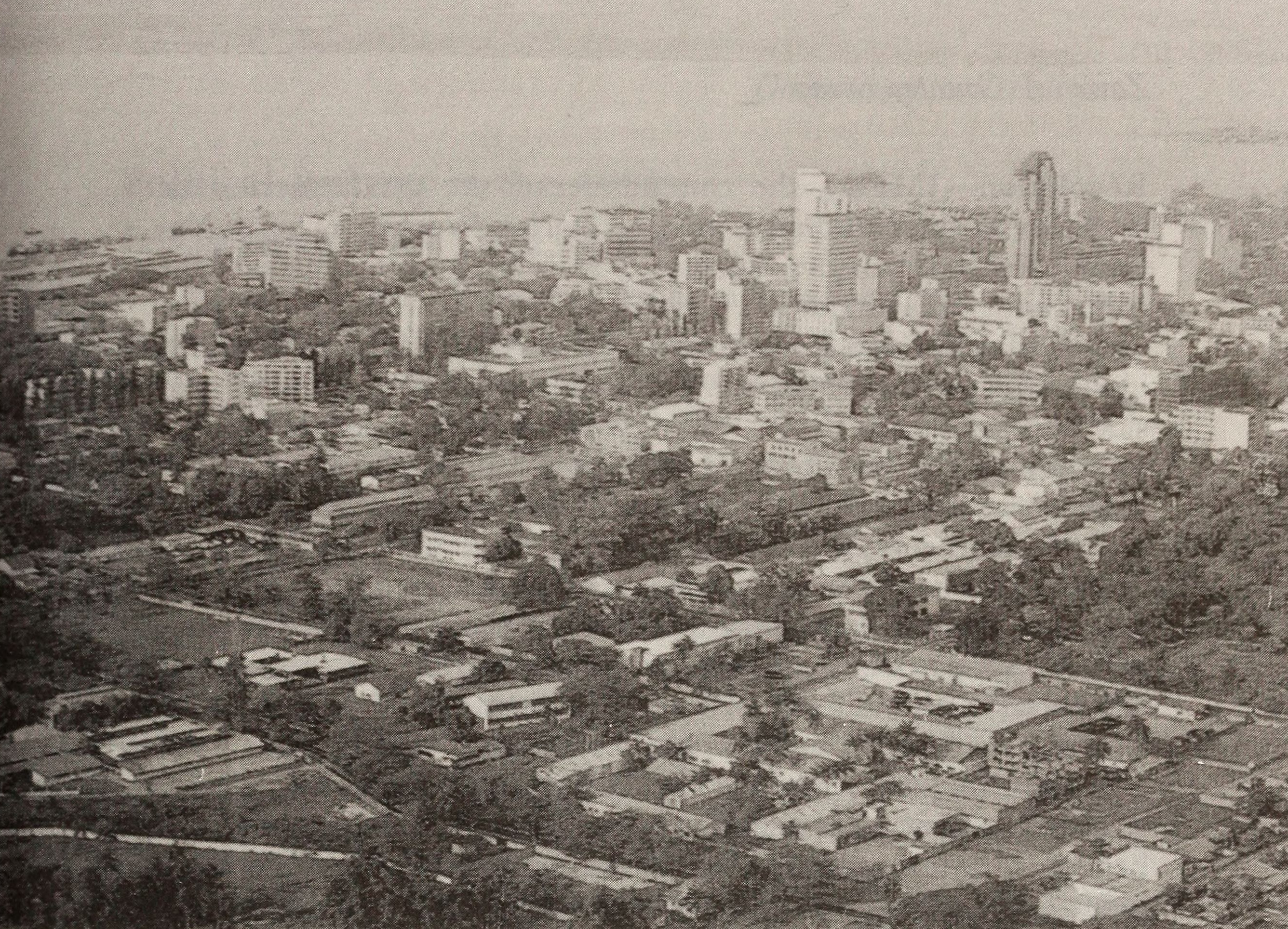
Kinshasa in the 1980s or early 1990s

By 25 September, Médecins Sans Frontières estimated that 1,250 to 1,750 people had been injured in Kinshasa alone. At this point, looting and rioting had mostly ceased in Kinshasa, with loyalist soldiers having secured the capital. However, riots continued in Likasi, Kamina, Kolwezi, and Kinsangani. On the same day, Portugal sent 25 soldiers to assist in the evacuation efforts of foreigners. On 26 September, FAZ loyalists opened fire on civilian demonstrators in Kinshasa who demanded an end of Mobutu's rule. By the next day, the French soldiers had moved into Kolwezi and Kinsangani, securing them after encountering some light resistance. The Belgians used their paratroopers to secure Lubumbashi. Having taken control of all major important airports in Zaire, the French and Belgian forces assisted in evacuating foreigners using planes of the French, Belgian, and Portuguese Air Force. The French and Belgian troops successfully evacuated 2,000 to 10,000 foreign citizens. Many foreigners in Shaba Province fled on their own to Zimbabwe and South Africa. Overall, 20,000 foreigners fled Zaire during the September unrest.

On 29 September Mobutu and the political opposition reached an agreement, whereby Étienne Tshisekedi was to be appointed Prime Minister, his cabinet would contain five Mobutu supporters and six opposition leaders, and the CNS would be reconvened. Western diplomats argued that this concession by Mobutu was motivated by Belgium and France threatening to withdraw their soldiers from Zaire. The United States also exerted diplomatic pressure on the Zairian government. However, the President did not concede any real power. Following his appointment, Tshisekedi asked France and Belgium on the President's behalf to not withdraw their troops from the country. At this point, the main phase of rioting had ended, and became subsequently known as the "pillage". The cities affected by the unrest suffered substantial damage, with much of Zaire's productive sector destroyed. Around 30 to 40% of all companies were plundered, and around 70% of the retail businesses were destroyed. Much infrastructure was badly damaged. At least 200 people were killed, including one French paratrooper. After the looting, the military bases across the country became ad hoc markets for stolen goods, while at least half the companies which had previously operated in Kinshasa left the city permanently. Many workers in the capital lost their jobs as a result of the riots.

=== October unrest ===
Sporadic unrest and violence continued. Tshisekedi was sworn in as Prime Minister on 16 October, but was fired by Mobutu six days later due to a dispute over the allotting of ministerial portfolios. Overall, his tenure counted just three weeks, the shortest of any Zairian Prime Minister between 1990 and 1997. With the opposition refusing to offer a new candidate, Mobutu appointed Bernardin Mungul Diaka as the new Prime Minister. More civil unrest followed, with protesters burning one of the presidential villas and pillaging Mungul Diaka's house. Demonstrations occurred in front of the French, Belgian, and U.S. American embassies, demanding a foreign intervention to depose the President. Civil servants went on strike. In Lubumbashi, discontented soldiers went on a looting spree, soon joined by civilians. The looters took everything moveable, including corrugated metal from the houses, while about 700 foreigners took refuge in a school. Other riots took place at Mbuji-Mayi, Kolwezi, and Likasi. Belgian troops evacuated 300 more foreigners from the country in response to the riots.

On 27 October, Mobutu announced that he would remain President regardless of domestic and international calls for his resignation; parts of the opposition —known as the "Sacred Coalition"— responded by attempting to set up an alternative government. France and Belgium officially terminated their intervention on 31 October and 4 November respectively.

== Mobutu's role in the unrest ==
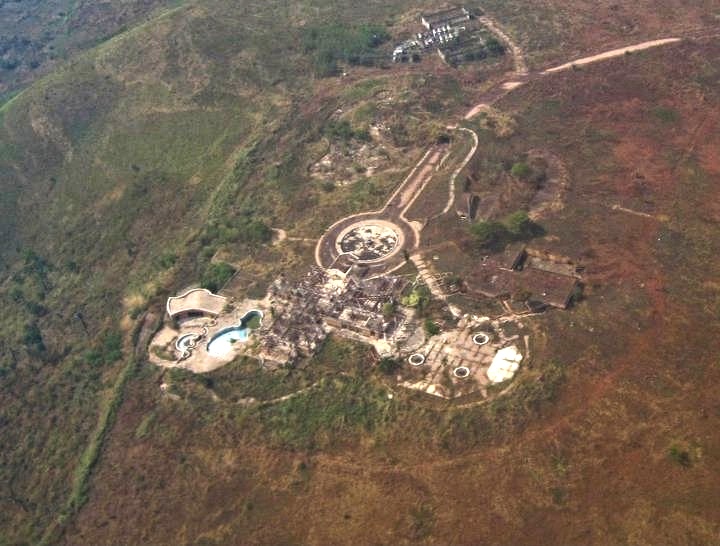
The ruins of Mobutu's palace in Gbadolite in 2011

Opposition leaders accused Mobutu of engineering the initial mutiny to provoke a military intervention by his Western allies. According to journalist Hugh Dellios, some analysts theorized that Mobutu had intended to use the riots as part of a "scare tactic". Even one of his loyalists, Kibambi Shintwa, later accused the President of opportunism in regards to the September riots. Shintwa told Van Reybrouck that Mobutu deliberately destroyed Zaire due to him not wanting to leave anything to the opposition, as he knew that his regime would not survive the democratization. He claimed that Mobutu completely settled in Gbadolite once the CNS began, and did nothing to halt the unrest, as he saw the looting as the just punishment for the people rejecting him in favor of the opposition. Florentin Mokonda Bonza, who worked in Mobutu's office at the time, also accused the President of directly organizing the unrest to showcase the importance of his firm rule. Journalist Paul Kenyon described Mobutu as being "delighted" at the riots, as he saw them as proof that the Zairians needed him as their leader to prevent total anarchy.

== Aftermath ==
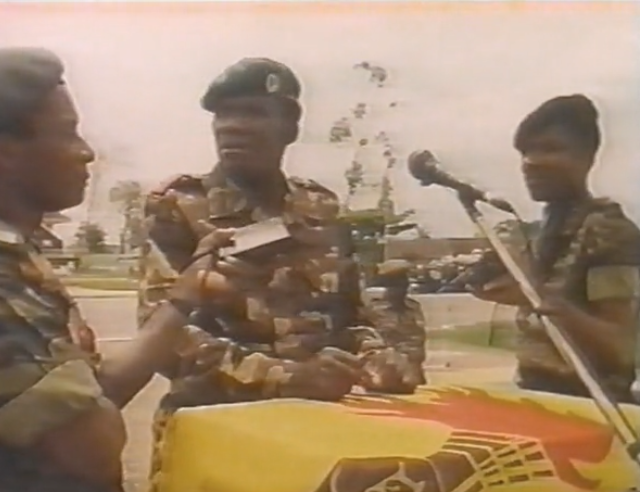
General Donatien Mahele Lieko Bokungu holds a speech in 1991 or 1993, imploring FAZ soldiers to stop rioting and looting.

After the unrest, France, Belgium, Israel, and China decided to completely withdraw their training teams which had previously supported the FAZ. France also terminated all economic assistance. All foreign troops left the country in February 1992, when Mobutu used the DSP to "brutally" suppress peaceful protests demanding the continuation of the CNS. The end of foreign support further reduced the FAZ's ability to function. The 31st Zairian Parachute Brigade, having garnered the reputation of usually siding with protesters—resulting in the nickname "People's Army"—earned Mobutu's disfavor. He ordered paratrooper training to be discontinued, officially due to lack of equipment, but mostly out of fear that the 31st Brigade might attempt an airborne attack on the presidential palace to overthrow him. However, Mobutu refrained of prosecuting or disciplining any soldiers involved in the mutinies and looting of 1991. General Mahele's reputation emerged strengthened as a result of the unrest. Zairian civilians were impressed with his conduct and ability to bring many mutineers back under control; even the soldiers did not resent that he had been responsible for killing some mutineers. As a result, Mobutu made Mahele FAZ chief of staff, but removed him from the post when the general called for the military to remain apolitical and for the soldiers' living conditions to be improved.

The CNS reconvened in November 1991, but it remained unable to properly operate. The Zairean government suspended it the following January. Mobutu's constitutional mandate as President of Zaire officially expired on 4 December 1991, but he refused to leave office until elections had been held, although such contests were not scheduled. The international community continued to pressure Mobutu to implement political reforms and introduce multiparty politics. The political crisis continued, reforms stalled, while the security and economic situation deteriorated across the country. The unrest of 1991 had further worsened the country's economic crisis. Rebels began to launch attacks in border areas, and the 41st Commando Brigade again revolted in 1992. Another major FAZ mutiny broke out in 1993, with the soldiers again demanding to be paid their back pay after Mobutu attempted to introduce a 5-million Zaire note. This time, the violence was worse than during the 1991 unrest. The President was only able to bring the situation under control by deploying the DSP and other loyal troops against the mutineers, resulting in up to 2,000 deaths including around 1,000 soldiers. The renewed unrest caused most of the businesses which had remained in Kinshasa up to this point to leave the country. Being no longer paid, civil servants went repeatedly on strike. At this point, Zaire's political system had effectively collapsed, while the economy had plunged into chaos. In 1996, the First Congo War erupted, resulting in Mobutu's violent overthrow. Much of the FAZ proved extremely unreliable during this conflict. Resentful FAZ soldiers argued that Mobutu's favorite unit, the DSP, "should do the fighting" alone. Many troops and even entire units deserted or outright defected to anti-government rebels.

The economic damage of the 1991 unrest extended into the 2010s, by which point Kinshasa's industrial sector had still not recovered. Many civilians in the capital recognized the long-term destructive effect of the looting sprees of 1991 and 1993, and consequently refrained from looting during the First Congo War.
