= DEMIAP =

Military intelligence organization of the Democratic Republic of the Congo

DEMIAP (Détection Militaire des Activités Anti-Patrie – Military Detection of Antipatriotic Activities) was the military intelligence organization of the Democratic Republic of the Congo. According to Belgian official sources in 2002, it falls under the authority, 'at least officially', of the chief of staff of Congolese Armed Forces (Forces armées congolaises, FAC), now succeeded by the FARDC. it was divided in two departements:

- DEMIAP/Extérieur: External security
- DEMIAP/Intérieur: Internal security

The DEMIAP succeeded to the Military Action and Intelligence Service (Service d'action et de renseignements militaires, SARM) that was created in 1986 with the main goal of reorganizing military intelligence gathering and create a deployable force capable to smash any threat internal ou external (Régiment d'Action Commando). His staff was estimated between 1500 and 2000 employees and was headed by then Colonel Mahele Lieko with several deputies:

- in charge of Action,
- in charge of Administration and
- in charge of Research.

It is now known since 2003 as General Staff of Military Intelligence.

== List of commanders of SARM/DEMIAP ==
1. Général Bonsange Bompese Bakola Ernest ( 1985 - 1986 ) 2.Général MAHELE LIEKO(1985–1991)

3. General BOLOZI GBUDU (1995–1997)

4. General SIKATENDA SHABANI (1997–1998)

5. Colonel DAMAS KABULO MYDIA VITA (1998–2001)

6. General DIEUDONNÉ KAYEMBE MBANDAKULU (2002–2003)

7. General DIDIER ETUMBA LONGILA (2003–2007)

8. General KITENGE TUNDWA (2007–2013)

9. General JEAN CLAUDE YAV KABEJ (2013–2014)

10. General TAGE TAGE (2014–2015)

11. General DELPHIN KAHIMBI (2015-...)

Three of its previous commanders, General MAHELE LIEKO, General Dieudonné Mbandakulu and Didier Etumba Longila, later assumed the Chief of Staff of the FARDC (ex-FAZ).
