= Kisempia Sungilanga =

Military chief of staff of Democratic Republic of the Congo

Kisempa Sungilanga
- Philemon Kisempia Sungilanga Lombe
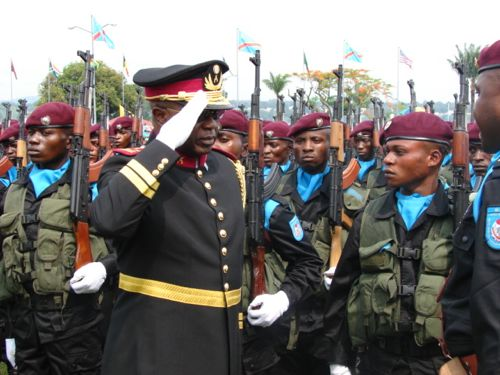
- Sungilanga in December 2006
- Military career
- Allegiance: Democratic Republic of the Congo
- Branch: Land Forces
- Service years: 1964—2013
- Rank: General
- Commands: 2nd Military Region; Military of the Democratic Republic of the Congo

Philemon Kisempia Sungilanga Lombe was the 17th chief of staff of the Military of the Democratic Republic of the Congo (FARDC). He took up the position on 26 June 2004, and held it until Tuesday 12 June 2007, when he was replaced by Lieutenant-Général Dieudonné Kayembe Mbandakulu. Earlier in his career, he commanded the 2nd Military Region in Bas-Congo province.

He was reported as a General de division and Chef d’état-major des forces armées in April 2007.

== Career ==
Sungilanga was trained at the Royal Cadet School (École royale des cadets) in Brussels from 1964 to 1967 during which he obtained his diploma. He then attended course at the Royal Military Academy (École royale militaire) in Belgium from 1967 to 1971. From 1971 to 1972, he attended courses at the Armoured Troops School (Ecole des troupes blindées) at Arlon. Five years later, in 1977, he joined the General Staff School (l’École de techniciens d'état-major) until 1979. From 1982 to 1984, il suit des cours à l’Institut royal supérieur de défense BEM à Bruxelles.

An announcement of his retirement was made by Ordonnance 13/082 of 13 July 2013. It is not clear what post he held between 2007 and 2013.

Military offices
Preceded by Admiral Baudoin Liwanga Mata Nyamuniobo	Chief of Staff of the FARDC; 2004 – 2007	Succeeded by Dieudonné Kayembe Mbandakulu
