= Navy of the Democratic Republic of the Congo =

National Navy
- Marine nationale
- Flag of the Democratic Republic of the Congo
- Active: 1960s—present
- Country: Democratic Republic of the Congo
- Branch: Navy
- Role: Protection of waters of DR Congo
- Size: 6,700 personnel 16 ships
- Part of: Armed Forces of the Democratic Republic of the Congo
- Command locations: Kinshasa; Goma; Matadi; Kalemie
- Engagements: Kivu conflict; 2018 Lake Edward skirmish

Commanders
- Chief of Staff: Vice Admiral Albert Kuyandi

The National Navy (French: Marine nationale) is the maritime component of the Armed Forces of the Democratic Republic of Congo (FARDC). It is a brown-water navy.

== History ==
Ordinance no.70/295 of 9 November 1970 fixed the organization of the Coast, River, and Lake Guard, after it had been created by ordonnance-loi 70/060 of the same day. A coast guard was headquartered at Banana, the River Guard at Kinshasa and the Lake Guard at Kalemie. Some five years later, however, the organization became the Force Navale Zairoise.

Before the downfall of Mobutu Sese Seko, Zaire operated a small navy on the Congo river with a few facilities on the Atlantic coast. It consisted of 1,300 personnel, including 600 marines. One of its installations was at the village of N'dangi near the presidential residence in Gbadolite. The port at N'dangi was the base for several patrol boats, helicopters and the presidential yacht. Boma and Matadi were the ports used for the Atlantic coast flotilla. During the 1970s Zaire acquired several patrol boats and torpedo boats from the U.S., China, and North Korea, France, but they received a low level of maintenance and many of them were removed from service by the 1990s.

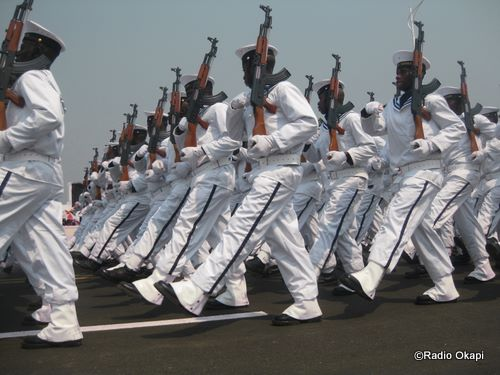
Congolese sailors at the Independence Day parade in Kinshasa, 10 June 2010.

The 2002 edition of Jane's Sentinel described the Navy as being "in a state of near total disarray" and stated that it did not conduct any training or have operating procedures. The Congolese navy shares the same discipline problems as the other services. It was initially placed under command of the MLC when the transition began: the current situation is uncertain.

The Congolese navy took part in an exercise overseen by United States Army troops in 2010 in Lake Tanganyika, to verify that it met African Union standards.

During the Dongo conflict in the northwestern DRC, a number of navy personnel fled across the Congo River to the nearby Republic of the Congo as refugees, along with many civilians.

In September 2017 the Congolese navy supported army operations against a Mai-Mai militia and sunk a rebel boat in Lake Tanganyika.

On 5 July 2018, the Congolese navy fought a skirmish against the Ugandan navy in Lake Edward after Ugandan vessels attacked Congolese fishing boats. Several people were killed in the clashes. The naval forces in the area on the Congolese side are commanded by Major Jean Tsongo. The Congolese navy in the area is also tasked with keeping rebels from Uganda from entering the DRC.

== Organization ==
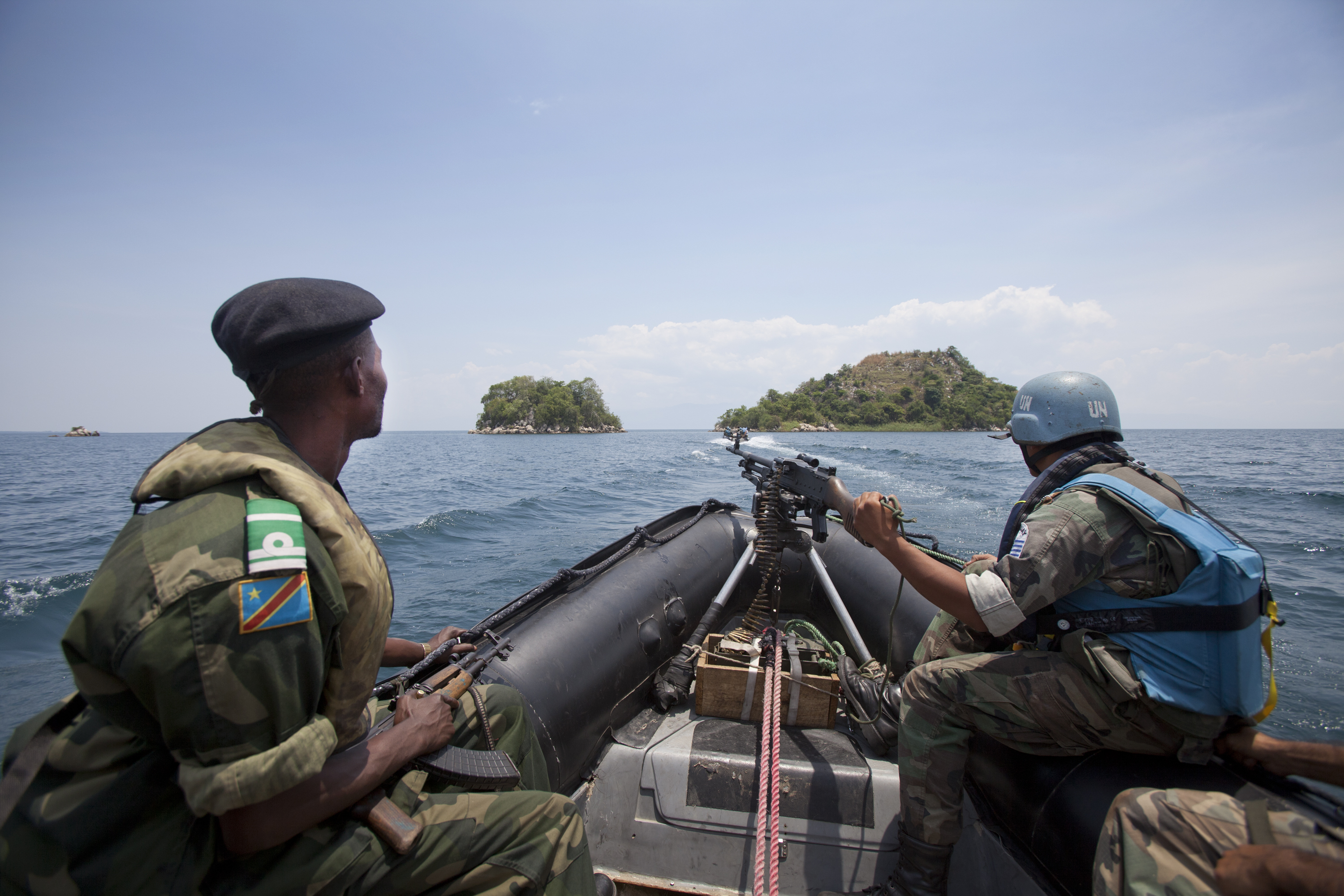
A Congolese sailor (left) with MONUSCO peacekeepers training on Lake Tanganyika, October 2012

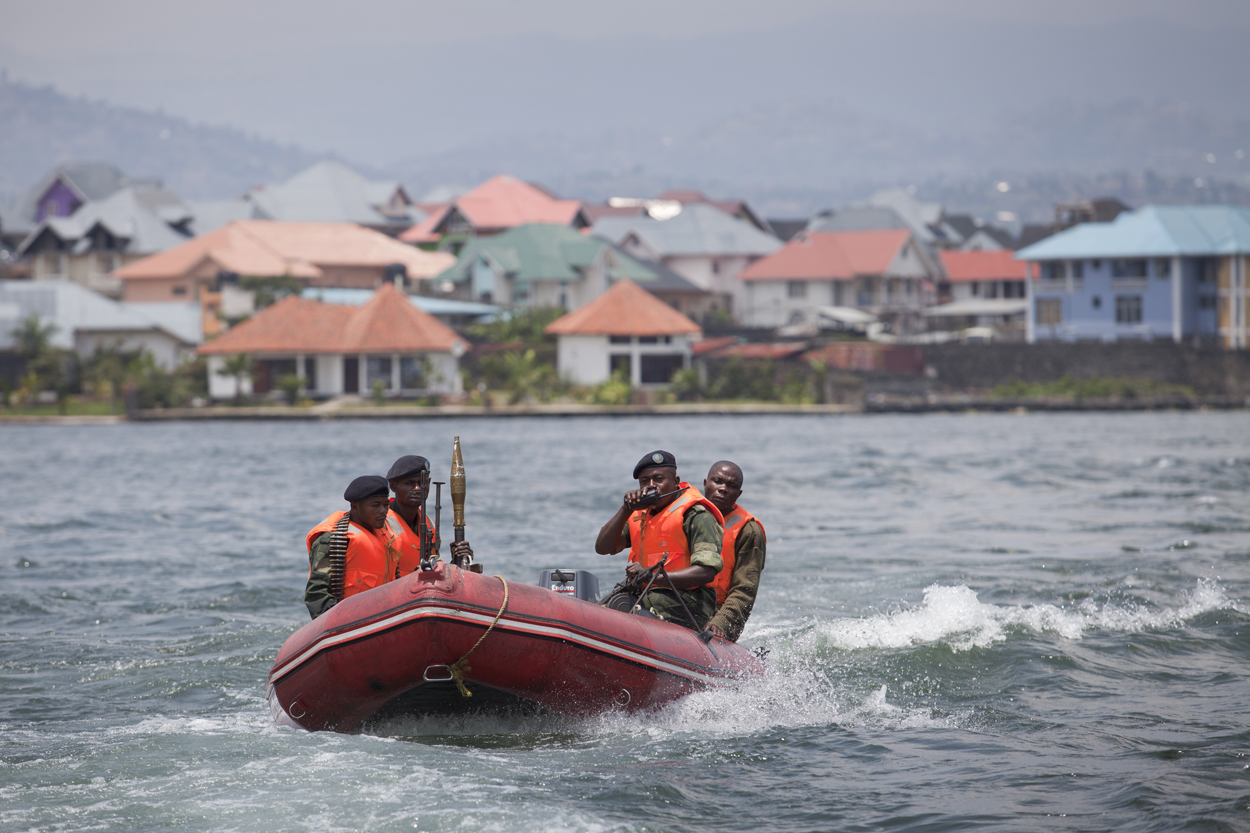
A FARDC naval patrol on Lake Kivu in 2012

The 2007 edition of Jane's Fighting Ships states that the Navy is organised into four commands, based at Matadi, near the coast; the capital Kinshasa, further up the Congo river; Kalemie, on Lake Tanganyika; and Goma, on Lake Kivu.

The IISS, in its 2007 edition of the Military Balance, confirms the bases listed in Jane's and adds a fifth base at Boma, a coastal city near Matadi.

In 2018 it was reported that the Chinese assisted the DRC with creating a naval base at the seaport town of Banana.

Various sources also refer to numbered Naval Regions. Operations of the 1st Naval Region have been reported in Kalemie, the 4th near the northern city of Mbandaka, and the 5th at Goma.

The IISS lists the Navy at 1,000 personnel and a total of eight patrol craft, of which only one is operational, a Shanghai II Type 062 class gunboat designated "102". There are five other 062s as well as two Swiftships which are not currently operational, though some may be restored to service in the future. According to Jane's, the Navy also operates barges and small craft armed with machine guns. It was reported that China had been providing military assistance to the DRC since 2008, and that included providing repairs and maintenance on the Shanghai gunboats in the FARDC navy.

=== Known chiefs of staff ===
- Grand Admiral Mavua Mudima (c. 1990s) – Zairian navy
- Admiral Baudoin Liwanga (1998–2003)
- Major General Dieudonne Amuli Bahigwa (2003–2007)
- Vice Admiral Didier Etumba Longomba (2007–2008) — later Chief of the General Staff.
- Vice Admiral Emmanuel Kyabu Kaniki (???–2014) — deputy navy commander for operations in 2007.
- Vice Admiral Rombault Mbuayama Nsiona (2014–2020) — former 6th military region commander.
- Vice Admiral Jean-Marie Valentin Matalinguma (2020–2022)
- Vice Admiral Albert Kuyandi (2022–present)

== Ranks ==
=== Commissioned officer ranks ===
The rank insignia of commissioned officers.

Rank group	General / flag officers				Senior officers			Junior officers
Navy of the DR Congo
Navy of the DR Congo	Grand amiral	Amiral	Vice-amiral	Contre-amiral	Capitaine de vaisseau	Capitaine de frégate	Capitaine de corvette	Lieutenant de vaisseau	Enseigne de vaisseau	Enseigne de vaisseau de 2^{e} classe

=== Other ranks ===
The rank insignia of non-commissioned officers and enlisted personnel.

Rank group	Senior NCOs							Junior NCOs	Enlisted
Navy of the DR Congo										No insignia
Navy of the DR Congo	Maître chef principal	Premier maître chef	Maître chef	Premier maître	Second maître	Maître	Quartier maître	Premier matelot	Second matelot	Matelot	Recrue
