= Faustin Munene =

Deputy Minister of the Interior
- In office 1997–1998
- President: Laurent-Désiré Kabila

Personal details
- Born: 21 March 1951 (age 75) Idiofa, Bandundu Province, Belgian Congo
- Occupation: Soldier, politician

Military service
- Allegiance: Angola; AFDL; DR Congo
- Years of service: 1960s–2006
- Rank: Major General
- Commands: Congolese Armed Forces; Congolese Air Force
- Battles/wars: Kwilu rebellion First Congo War; Second Congo War

Faustin Munene (born 21 March 1951) is a Congolese military officer and politician known for his opposition to Mobutu Sese Seko, leader of Zaïre, and later President Joseph Kabila of the Democratic Republic of the Congo. He held a number of senior military posts under Laurent-Désiré Kabila after the fall of Mobutu, including commander of the Congolese Air Force, and Deputy Minister of the Interior. Since 2010, he has been living in exile in the neighboring Republic of the Congo, having fled there since being accused by the DRC authorities of plotting a coup.

== Biography ==
Born in the town of Idiofa, in Bandundu Province of Belgian Congo, Munene took part in the early rebellions in the 1960s under Pierre Mulele against the central government in Kinshasa. Munene later escaped to Angola, where he joined the Angolan Army. He later became a member of the AFDL under Laurent-Désiré Kabila. Reaching the rank of major general, he served as the Deputy Minister of the Interior and Public Safety from 1997 to 1998, during the Second Congo War. He was also the chief of staff of the Congolese Armed Forces in 1999, before becoming chief of staff of the Air Force. Under Joseph Kabila, Munene was placed in charge of recruitment and training. He retired from the Armed Forces in 2006.

His residence was attacked by unidentified men in October 2009. In September 2010, Munene was sentenced to life imprisonment by a military court in the DRC for attempting to overthrow the government of President Joseph Kabila and start a rebellion in Bas-Congo. He then disappeared and was found to have fled to Brazzaville, capital of the neighboring Republic of the Congo. His presence there became a source of tension between Congo-Brazzaville and Congo-Kinshasa, but the former refused to extradite the general to the DRC. Since fleeing to exile in the neighboring Congo, Munene has been accused of being the leader of the rebel group Army of Popular Resistance, which opposes the DRC central government under Kabila.
