= Donatien Mahele Lieko Bokungu =

Zairean general

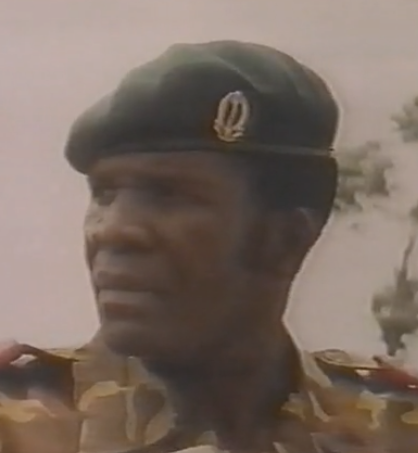

Vice Prime Minister for National Defense and Veterans
- In office April 11, 1997 – May 16, 1997
- Prime Minister: Likulia Bolongo
- Preceded by: Likulia Bolongo
- Succeeded by: Laurent-Désiré Kabila

Personal details
- Born: April 14, 1941 Equateur, Belgian Congo
- Died: May 16, 1997 (Aged 56) Kinshasa, Zaire

Military service
- Allegiance: (Democratic Republic of the Congo) Congo-Léopoldville (1965–1971); Zaire (1971–1997)
- Branch/service: Zairian Armed Forces
- Years of service: 1965-1997
- Rank: General
- Battles/wars: Shaba I; Shaba II; Rwandan Civil War; 1991 Zaire unrest; First Congo War

Donatien "Marc" Mahele Lieko Bokungu (April 14, 1941 – May 16, 1997) was a prominent Zairean general who served as the last army chief during the long reign of Mobutu Sese Seko.

== Biography ==
Born in 1941, Mahele, a carpenter by trade, was born in Mobutu's Équateur region, but unlike Mobutu, he was not from the Ngbandi tribe; he was a Mbuza.

One of the few Zairian generals not related to Mobutu, he was unique in that he attained his rank on his own merits, rather than through political patronage. Trained in France, he was a member of Mobutu's bodyguard in the 1970s. He fought in the Shaba I conflict, and came to prominence during the Shaba II war. He distinguished himself during the Shaba wars through his discipline and good conduct. After Shaba II, he was promoted to general and given command of the Berets Rouge (French: "Red Berets").

In 1990, led a contingent of the Special Presidential Division that was sent to Rwanda to aid Mobutu's beleaguered ally, President Juvénal Habyarimana. In the following year, he helped to put down riots, looting, and protests by mutinying soldiers and civilians in Kinshasa.

Mahele, widely perceived as being incorruptible, won massive popularity with ordinary Zairians for his suppression of rioting by Mobutu's soldiers in the early 1990s; nevertheless, he was viewed less favorably by other Zairian generals, for the same reasons. He was an outspoken critic of governmental corruption in Zaire. Afterwards, he was nominated by Mobutu to be the army chief of staff, ranked as a Général de corps d'armée, but his outspoken belief that the military should be apolitical and accountable to the Zairian people did not sit well with the President, who immediately replaced him with another general. Mahele was assigned the essentially powerless title attache à la presidence, and spent the next three years pursuing business opportunities and maintaining a low profile.

Late in the First Congo War, he was pulled out of semi-retirement and appointed army chief of staff, Deputy Prime Minister, and Minister of National Defense and Veterans' Affairs and tasked with reforming the Zairian military and defeating Laurent Kabila's rebels.

On the eve of Mobutu's overthrow, Mahele was killed by Mobutu loyalists for trying to negotiate a peaceful surrender with Kabila, in order to prevent a final battle in the capital city, Kinshasa, and spare its people from the bloodshed that would have likely ensued. Mobutu's son, Kongulu Mobutu, was suspected by some of being involved in Mahele's death, while others, including Kongulu's brother Nzanga, dispute this.
