= First Congo War =

1996–1997 war in central Africa

- Part of the Congolese Civil Wars, aftermath of the Rwandan genocide, spillovers of the Burundian Civil War, the Second Sudanese Civil War and the Angolan Civil War
- A map of the AFDL offensive
Date	24 October 1996 – 16 May 1997 (6 months, 3 weeks and 1 day)
Location	Zaire, with spillovers into Uganda and Sudan
Result	AFDL victory; Overthrow of the Mobutu regime; Zaire renamed back to the Democratic Republic of the Congo; Installation of Laurent-Désiré Kabila as President; Beginning of Second Congo War

Belligerents
Zaire; FAZ; White Legion; Sudan; Chad; (Rwanda) Ex-FAR/ALiR; Interahamwe; CNDD–FDD; UNITA; ADF; FLNC; LRA; UNRF II Supported by: FR Yugoslavia (military aid); Mai-Mai (Note: Many Mai-Mai militias in eastern Zaire initially allied themselves with Rwanda and the AFDL against Hutu militants and refugees. As soon as most Hutu were driven away, however, many Mai-Mai groups turned against Rwanda and the AFDL. Despite this, some anti-Hutu Mai-Mai remained allied with Rwanda and the AFDL.)	(Democratic Republic of the Congo) AFDL; Rwanda; Uganda; Burundi; Angola; (South Sudan) SPLA; Eritrea; Mai-Mai

Commanders and leaders
(Zaire) Mobutu Sese Seko; (Zaire) Donatien Mahele Lieko Bokungu (executed); (Zaire) Christian Tavernier; (Sudan) Omar al-Bashir; Jonas Savimbi; (Rwanda) Paul Rwarakabije; Robert Kajuga; (Rwanda) Tharcisse Renzaho	(Democratic Republic of the Congo) Laurent-Désiré Kabila; (Democratic Republic of the Congo) André Kisase Ngandu †; (Rwanda) Paul Kagame; (Rwanda) James Kabarebe; (Uganda) Yoweri Museveni; (Burundi) Pierre Buyoya; (Angola) José Eduardo dos Santos

Strength
Zaire: c. 50,000 (Note: Officially, the FAZ had c. 80,000 soldiers by the war's start, though the actual number was closer to about 50,000. Of these, just 25,000 were in a condition to fight, whereas the rest was likely to flee or desert upon the first signs of combat.); Interahamwe: 40,000–100,000 total UNITA: c. 1,000–2,000	AFDL: 57,000; Kadogo (child soldiers): 10,000–15,000; Rwanda: 3,500–4,000; Angola: 3,000+; Eritrea: 1 battalion

Casualties and losses
10,000–15,000 killed 10,000 defected thousands surrender	3,000–5,000 killed
- 222,000 refugees missing Total: 250,000 dead

The First Congo War, (Note: French: Première guerre du Congo) also known as Africa's First World War, was a civil and international military conflict that lasted from 24 October 1996 to 16 May 1997, primarily taking place in Zaire (which was renamed the Democratic Republic of the Congo during the conflict). The war resulted in the overthrow of Zairean President Mobutu Sese Seko, who was replaced by rebel leader Laurent-Désiré Kabila. This conflict, which also involved multiple neighboring countries, set the stage for the Second Congo War (1998–2003) due to tensions between Kabila and his former allies.

By 1996, Zaire was in a state of political and economic collapse, exacerbated by long-standing internal strife and the destabilizing effects of the 1994 Rwandan genocide, which had led to an influx of refugees and militant groups into the country. The Zairean government under Mobutu, weakened by years of dictatorship and corruption, was unable to maintain control, and the army had deteriorated significantly. With Mobutu terminally ill and unable to manage his fractured government, loyalty to his regime waned. The end of the Cold War further reduced Mobutu's international support, leaving his regime politically and financially bankrupt.

The war began when Rwanda invaded eastern Zaire in 1996 to target rebel groups that had sought refuge there. This invasion expanded as Uganda, Burundi, Angola, and Eritrea joined, while an anti-Mobutu coalition of Congolese rebels formed. Despite efforts to resist, Mobutu's regime quickly collapsed, with widespread violence and ethnic killings occurring throughout the conflict. Hundreds of thousands died as the government forces, supported by Sudanese troops, were overwhelmed.

After Mobutu's ousting, Kabila's government renamed the country the Democratic Republic of the Congo. However, his regime remained unstable, as he sought to distance himself from his former Rwandan and Ugandan backers. In response, Kabila expelled foreign troops and forged alliances with regional powers such as Angola, Zimbabwe, and Namibia. These actions prompted a second invasion from Rwanda and Uganda, triggering the Second Congo War in 1998. Some historians and analysts view the First and Second Congo Wars as part of a continuous conflict with lasting effects that continue to affect the region today.

== Background ==
=== Decline of Zaire ===
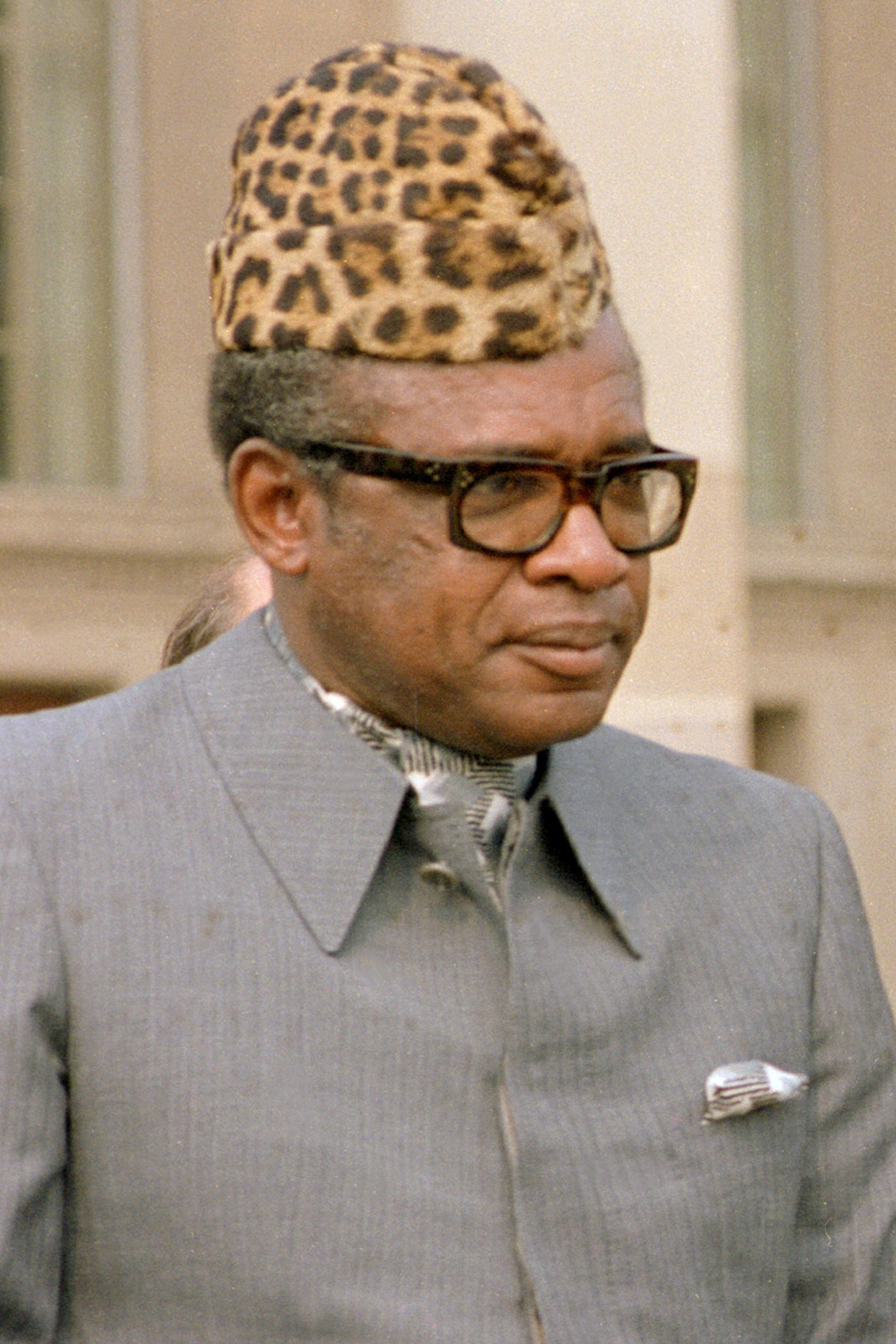
Mobutu Sese Seko, long-time dictator of Zaire

An ethnic Ngbandi, Mobutu came to power in 1965 and enjoyed support from the United States government because of his anti-communist stance while in office. However, Mobutu's totalitarian rule and corrupt policies allowed the Zairian state to decay, evidenced by a 65% decrease in Zairian GDP between independence in 1960 and the end of Mobutu's reign in 1997. Following the end of the Cold War in 1992, the United States stopped supporting Mobutu in favor of what it called a "new generation of African leaders", including Rwanda's Paul Kagame and Uganda's Yoweri Museveni.

A wave of democratization swept across Africa during the 1990s. Under substantial internal and external pressure for a democratic transition in Zaire, Mobutu promised reform. He officially ended the one-party system he had maintained since 1967, but ultimately proved unwilling to implement broad reform, alienating allies both at home and abroad. In fact, the Zairian state had all but ceased to exist.

The majority of the Zairian population relied upon an informal economy for their subsistence, since the official economy was not reliable. Furthermore, the Zairian national army, Forces Armées Zaïroises (FAZ), was forced to prey upon the population for survival; Mobutu himself allegedly once asked FAZ soldiers why they needed pay when they had weapons.

Mobutu's rule encountered considerable internal resistance, and given the weak central state, rebel groups could find refuge in Zaire's eastern provinces, far from the capital, Kinshasa. Opposition groups included leftists who had supported Patrice Lumumba (1925–1961), as well as ethnic and regional minorities opposed to the nominal dominance of Kinshasa. Laurent-Désiré Kabila, an ethnic Luba from Katanga province who would eventually overthrow Mobutu, had fought Mobutu's régime since its inception. The inability of the Mobutuist régime to control rebel movements in its eastern provinces eventually allowed its internal and external foes to ally.

=== Ethnic tensions ===
Tensions had existed between various ethnic groups in eastern Zaire for centuries, especially between the agrarian tribes of Congo and the Banyarwanda in the Eastern region of Congo of Kivu. When colonial boundaries were drawn in the late nineteenth century many Banyarwanda found themselves on the Congolese side of the Rwandan border, in Kivu province. The earliest of these migrants arrived before colonisation in the 1880s, followed by emigrants whom the Belgian colonizers forcibly relocated to Congo to perform manual labour (after 1908), and by another significant wave of emigrants fleeing the social revolution of 1959 that brought the Hutu to power in Kigali.

Tutsi who emigrated to Zaire before Congolese independence in 1960 are known as Banyamulenge, meaning "from Mulenge", and had the right to citizenship under Zairian law. Tutsi who emigrated to Zaire following independence are known as Banyarwanda, although the native locals often do not distinguish between the two, calling both Banyamulenge and considering them foreigners.

After coming to power in 1965, Mobutu gave the Banyamulenge political power in the east in hopes that they, as a minority, would keep a tight grip on power and prevent more populous ethnicities from forming an opposition. This move aggravated the existing ethnic tensions by strengthening the Banyamulenge's hold over important stretches of land in North Kivu that indigenous people claimed as their own. From 1963 to 1966 the Hunde and Nande ethnic groups of North Kivu fought against Rwandan emigrants — both Tutsi and Hutu – in the Kanyarwanda War, which involved several massacres.

Despite a strong Rwandan presence in Mobutu's government, in 1981, Zaire adopted a restrictive citizenship law which denied the Banyamulenge and Banyarwanda citizenship and therewith all political rights. Though never enforced, the law greatly angered individuals of Rwandan descent and contributed to a rising sense of ethnic hatred. From 1993 to 1996 Hunde, Nande, and Nyanga youth regularly attacked the Banyamulenge, leading to a total of 14,000 deaths. In 1995 the Zairian Parliament ordered all peoples of Rwandan or Burundian descent repatriated to their countries of origin, including the Banyamulenge. Due to political exclusion and ethnic violence, as early as 1991 the Banyamulenge developed ties to the Rwandan Patriotic Front (RPF), a mainly Tutsi rebel movement based in Uganda but with aspirations to power in Rwanda.

=== Rwandan genocide ===
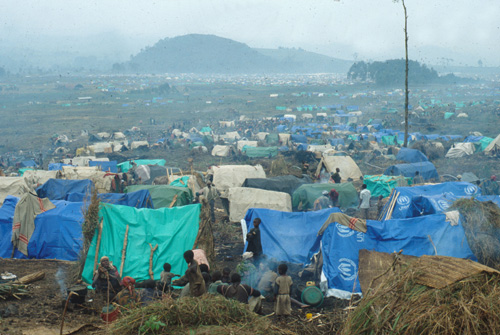
A Rwandan refugee camp in Zaire, 1994

The most deciding event in precipitating the war was the genocide in neighbouring Rwanda in 1994, which sparked a mass exodus of refugees known as the Great Lakes refugee crisis. During the 100-day genocide, hundreds of thousands of Tutsi and sympathizers were massacred at the hands of predominantly Hutu aggressors. The genocide ended when the Hutu government in Kigali was overthrown by the Tutsi-dominated Rwandan Patriotic Front (RPF).

Of those who fled Rwanda during the crisis, about 1.5 million settled in eastern Zaire. These refugees included Tutsi who fled the Hutu génocidaires as well as one million Hutu that fled the Tutsi RPF's subsequent retaliation. Prominent among the latter group were the génocidaires themselves, such as elements of the former Rwandan Army, Forces armées rwandaises (FAR), and independent Hutu extremist groups known as Interahamwe. Often, these Hutu forces allied themselves with local Mai Mai militias, who granted them access to mines and weapons. Though these were initially self-defense organizations, they quickly became aggressors.

The Hutu set up camps in eastern Zaire from which they attacked both the newly arrived Rwandan Tutsi as well as the Banyamulenge and Banyarwanda. These attacks caused about one hundred deaths a month during the first half of 1996. Furthermore, the newly arrived militants were intent on returning to power in Rwanda and began launching attacks against the new regime in Kigali, which represented a serious security threat to the infant state. Not only was the Mobutu government incapable of controlling the former génocidaires for previously mentioned reasons but actually supported them in training and supplying for an invasion of Rwanda, forcing Kigali to act.

== Banyamulenge rebellion ==
Given the exacerbated ethnic tensions and the lack of government control in the past, Rwanda took action against the security threat posed by génocidaires who had found refuge in eastern Zaire. The government in Kigali began forming Tutsi militias for operations in Zaire probably as early as 1995 and chose to act following an exchange of fire between Rwandan Tutsi and Zairian Green Berets that marked the outbreak of the Banyamulenge Rebellion on 31 August 1996.

While there was general unrest in eastern Zaire, the rebellion was probably not a grassroots movement; Uganda president Yoweri Museveni, who supported and worked closely with Rwanda in the First Congo War, later recalled that the rebellion was incited by Zairian Tutsi who had been recruited by the Rwandan Patriotic Army (RPA). The initial goal of the Banyamulenge Rebellion was to seize power in Zaire's eastern Kivu provinces and combat the extremist Hutu forces attempting to continue the genocide in their new home. However, the rebellion did not remain Tutsi-dominated for long. Mobutu's harsh and selfish rule created enemies in virtually all sectors of Zairian society. As a result, the new rebellion benefited from massive public support and grew to be a general revolution rather than a mere Banyamulenge uprising.

Banyamulenge elements and non-Tutsi militias coalesced into the Alliance of Democratic Forces for the Liberation of Congo (AFDL) under the leadership of Laurent-Désiré Kabila, who had been a long-time opponent of the Mobutu government and was a leader of one of the three main rebel groups that founded the AFDL. While the AFDL was an ostensibly Zairian rebel movement, Rwanda had played a key role in its formation. Observers of the war, as well as the Rwandan Defense Minister and vice-president at the time, Paul Kagame, claim that the AFDL was formed in and directed from Kigali and contained not only Rwandan-trained troops but also regulars of the RPA.

== Foreign involvement ==
=== Rwanda ===
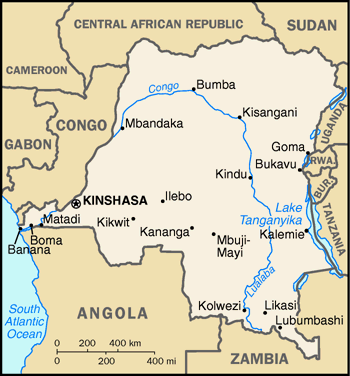
A map of Zaire

According to expert observers, as well as Kagame himself, Rwanda played the largest role of a foreign actor, if not the largest role of all, in the First Congo War. Kigali was instrumental in the formation of the AFDL and sent its own troops to fight alongside the rebels. While its actions were originally sparked by the security threat posed by the Zairian-based génocidaires, Kigali was pursuing multiple goals during its invasion of Zaire.

The first and foremost of these was the suppression of génocidaires who had been launching attacks against the new Rwandan state from Zaire. Kagame claimed that Rwandan agents had discovered the plans to invade Rwanda with support from Mobutu; in response, Kigali began its intervention with the intention of dismantling the refugee camps in which the génocidaires often took refuge and destroying the structure of these anti-Rwandan elements.

A second goal cited by Kagame was the overthrow of Mobutu. While partially a means to minimize the threat in eastern Zaire, the new Rwandan state also sought to set up a puppet regime in Kinshasa. This goal was not particularly threatening to other states in the region because it was ostensibly a means to secure Rwandan stability and because many of them also opposed Mobutu. Kigali was further aided by the tacit support of the United States, which supported Kagame as a member of the new generation of African leaders.

However, the true intentions of Rwanda are not entirely clear. Some authors have proposed that dismantling refugee camps was a means of replenishing Rwanda's depleted population and workforce following the genocide; because the destruction of the camps was followed by forced repatriation of Tutsi regardless of whether they were Rwandan or Zairian. The intervention may also have been motivated by revenge; the Rwandan forces, as well as the AFDL, massacred retreating Hutu refugees in several known instances. A commonly cited factor for Rwandan actions is that the RPF, which had recently come to power in Kigali, had come to see itself as the protector of the Tutsi nation and was therefore partially acting in defense of its Zairian brethren.

Rwanda possibly also harbored ambitions to annex portions of eastern Zaire. Pasteur Bizimungu, president of Rwanda from 1994 to 2000, presented the then-US ambassador to Rwanda, Robert Gribbin, with the idea of a "Greater Rwanda." This idea purports that the ancient state of Rwanda included parts of eastern Zaire that should actually belong to Rwanda. However, it appears that Rwanda never seriously attempted to annex these territories. The history of conflict in the Congo is often associated with illegal resource exploitation but, although Rwanda did benefit financially by plundering Zaire's wealth, this is not usually considered their initial motivation for Rwandan intervention in the First Congo War.

=== Uganda ===
As a close ally of the RPF, Uganda also played a major role in the First Congo War. Prominent members of the RPF had fought alongside Yoweri Museveni in the Ugandan Bush War that brought him to power, and Museveni allowed the RPF to use Uganda as a base during the 1990 offensive into Rwanda and subsequent civil war. Given their historical ties, the Rwandan and Ugandan governments were closely allied and Museveni worked closely with Kagame throughout the First Congo War. Ugandan soldiers were present in Zaire throughout the conflict and Museveni likely helped Kagame plan and direct the AFDL.

Lt. Col. James Kabarebe of the AFDL, for example, was a former member of Uganda's National Resistance Army, the military wing of the rebel movement that brought Museveni to power, and French and Belgian intelligence reported that 15,000 Ugandan-trained Tutsi fought for the AFDL. However, Uganda did not support Rwanda in all aspects of the war. Museveni was reportedly much less inclined to overthrow Mobutu, preferring to keep the rebellion in the East where the former génocidaires were operating.

=== Angola ===
Angola remained on the sidelines until 1997, but its entrance into the fray greatly increased the already superior strength of anti-Mobutu forces. The Angolan government chose to act primarily through the original-Katanga Gendarmeries later called the Tigres, proxy groups formed from the remnants of police units exiled from Congo in the 1960s, fighting to return to their homeland. Luanda did also deploy regular troops. Angola chose to participate in the First Congo War because members of Mobutu's government were directly involved in supplying the Angolan rebel group, UNITA.

It is unclear exactly how the government benefited from this relationship, other than personal enrichment for several officials, but it is certainly possible that Mobutu was unable to control the actions of some members of his government. Regardless of the reasoning in Kinshasa, Angola entered the war on the side of the rebels and was determined to overthrow the Mobutu government, which it saw as the only way to address the threat posed by the Zairian-UNITA relationship.

=== UNITA ===
Due to its ties to the Mobutu government, UNITA also participated in the First Congo War. The greatest impact that it had on the war was probably that it gave Angola reason to join the anti-Mobutu coalition. However, UNITA forces fought alongside FAZ forces in at least several instances. Among other examples, Kagame claimed that his forces fought a pitched battle against UNITA near Kinshasa towards the end of the war.

=== Others ===
Numerous other external actors played lesser roles in the First Congo War. Burundi, which had recently come under the rule of a pro-Tutsi leader, supported Rwandan and Ugandan involvement in Zaire but provided very limited military support. Zambia, Zimbabwe, and the South Sudanese rebel army, the SPLA, gave measured amounts of military support to the rebel movement. Eritrea, an ally of Rwanda under Kagame, sent an entire battalion of its army to support the invasion of Zaire.

Tanzania, South Africa and Ethiopia provided support to the anti-Mobutu coalition. Other than from UNITA, Mobutu also received some aid from Sudan, whom Mobutu had long supported against the SPLA, though the exact amount of aid is unclear and ultimately was unable to hinder the advance of opposing forces. Zaire also employed foreign mercenaries from several African and European countries, including Chadian troops.

France provided Mobutu's government with financial support and military aid, facilitated by the Central African Republic, and diplomatically advocated for international intervention to stop the AFDL's advance, but later backed down due to U.S. pressure. China and Israel provided the Mobutu regime with technical assistance. Kuwait reportedly provided $64 million to Zaire for the purchase of weapons, but later denied doing so.

In 1997 United States European Command supervised the U.S. Army's Southern Europe Task Force (SETAF) and elements of two Marine Expeditionary Units to carry out Operation Guardian Retrieval, to evacuate approximately 550 US citizens from the country. SETAF prepared Joint Task Force Guardian Retrieval to carry out the non-combatant evacuation (NEO). The Marine Corps supported the evacuation with the 26th Marine Expeditionary Unit (MEU), special operations capable, which had initially been sent to Albania, to support Operation Silver Wake. The 26th MEU was relieved two weeks early by the USS Kearsarge (LHD-3) and the 22nd Marine Expeditionary Unit.

== Course of the war ==
=== 1996 ===
With active support from Rwanda, Uganda, and Eritrea, Kabila's AFDL was able to capture 800 x 100 km of territory along the border with Rwanda, Uganda, and Burundi by 25 December 1996. The occupation temporarily satisfied the rebels, because it gave them power in the east and allowed them to defend themselves against the former génocidaires. Likewise, the external resistance had successfully crippled the ability of the same génocidaires to use Zaire as a base for attacks. There was a pause in the rebel advance following the acquisition of buffer territory that lasted until Angola entered the war in February 1997.

During that time, Rwanda destroyed refugee camps the génocidaires had been using as safe-bases, and forcibly repatriated Tutsi to Rwanda. It also captured many lucrative diamond and coltan mines, which it later resisted relinquishing. Rwandan and aligned forces committed multiple atrocities, mainly against Hutu refugees. The true extent of the abuses is unknown because the AFDL and RPF carefully managed NGO and press access to areas where atrocities were thought to have occurred. However Amnesty International said as many as 200,000 Rwandese Hutu refugees were massacred by them and the Rwandan Defence Forces and aligned forces. The United Nations similarly documented mass killings of civilians by Rwandan, Ugandan and the AFDL soldiers in the DRC Mapping Exercise Report.

=== 1997 ===
Kabila's forces launched an offensive in March 1997, and demanded that the Kinshasa government surrender. The rebels took Kasenga on 27 March. The government denied the rebels' success, starting a long pattern of false statements from the Defense Minister on the progress and conduct of the war. Negotiations were proposed in late March, and on 2 April a new Prime Minister of Zaire, Étienne Tshisekedi—a longtime rival of Mobutu—was installed. Kabila, by this point in control of roughly one-quarter of the country, dismissed this as irrelevant and warned Tshisekedi that he would have no part in a new government if he accepted the post.

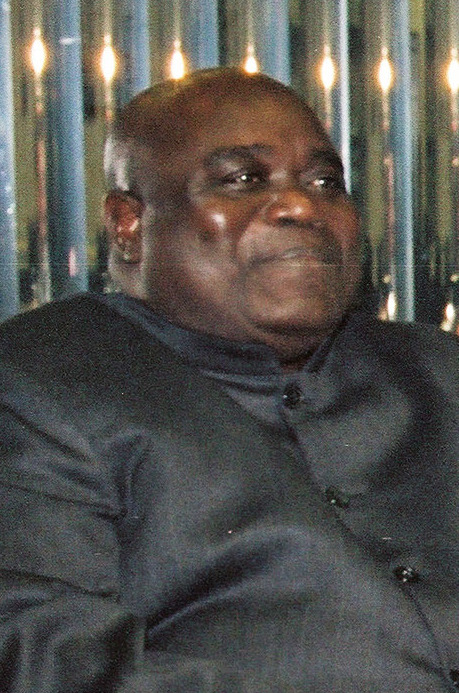
President Laurent-Désiré Kabila

There are two explanations for the restart of the rebel advance in 1997. The first, and most probable, is that Angola had joined the anti-Mobutu coalition, giving it numbers and strength far superior to the FAZ, and demanding that Mobutu be removed from power. Kagame presents another, possibly secondary, reason for the march on Kinshasa: that the employment of Serbian mercenaries in the battle for Walikale proved that "Mobutu intended to wage real war against Rwanda." According to this logic, Rwanda's initial concerns had been to manage the security threat in eastern Zaire but it was now forced to dispose of the hostile government in Kinshasa.

Whatever the case, once the advance resumed in 1997, there was virtually no meaningful resistance from what was left of Mobutu's army. Kabila's forces were only held back by the dilapidated state of Zaire's infrastructure. In some areas, no real roads existed; the only means of transport were infrequently used dirt paths. The AFDL committed grave human rights violations, such as the carnage at a refugee camp of Hutu at Tingi-Tingi near Kisangani, where tens of thousands of refugees were massacred.

Coming from the east, the AFDL advanced westward in two pincer movements. The northern one took Kisangani, Boende, and Mbandaka, while the southern one took Bakwanga, and Kikwit. Around this time, Sudan attempted to coordinate with remnants of the FAZ and White Legion that were retreating northward to escape the AFDL. This was to prevent Zaire from becoming a safe haven for the Sudan People's Liberation Army (SPLA) and its allies, which were fighting the Sudanese government in the Second Sudanese Civil War at the time.

The Mobutu loyalist forces were collapsing so quickly that they could not prevent the AFDL, SPLA and Ugandan military from occupying northeastern Zaire. Sudanese-backed Ugandan insurgent groups which had been based in the region were forced to retreat into southern Sudan alongside FAZ troops that had not yet surrendered and a smaller number of Sudanese Armed Forces (SAF) soldiers. They attempted to reach the SAF base at Yei, not knowing that it had already been overrun by the SPLA. The column of about 4,000 fighters and their families was ambushed by the SPLA during Operation Thunderbolt on 12 March, and mostly destroyed; 2,000 were killed, and over 1,000 captured. The survivors fled to Juba.

Meanwhile, the AFDL reached Kinshasa by the middle of May. Another AFDL group captured Lubumbashi on April 19 and moved on by air to Kinshasa. Mobutu fled Kinshasa on May 16, and the rebels entered the capital without serious resistance. The AFDL-allied Eritrean battalion had aided the rebels during the entire 1,500 km advance despite being not well equipped for the environment and lacking almost all logistical support. By the time the Eritreans arrived at Kinshasa along the AFDL, they were exhausted, starving and ill, having suffered heavy casualties as a result. They had to be evacuated from the country by the war's end.

Throughout the rebel advance, there were attempts by the international community to negotiate a settlement. However, the AFDL did not take these negotiations seriously but instead partook so as to avoid international criticism for being unwilling to attempt a diplomatic solution while actually continuing its steady advance. The FAZ, which had been weak all along, was unable to mount any serious resistance to the strong AFDL and its foreign sponsors.

Mobutu fled first to his palace at Gbadolite, then to Togo, and finally to Rabat, Morocco, where he died on 7 September 1997. Kabila proclaimed himself president on 17 May, and immediately ordered a violent crackdown to restore order. He then attempted to reorganise the nation as the Democratic Republic of the Congo (DRC).

== Aftermath ==
The new Congolese state under Kabila's rule proved to be disappointingly similar to Zaire under Mobutu. The economy remained in a state of severe disrepair and deteriorated further under Kabila's corrupt rule. He failed to improve the government, which continued to be weak and corrupt. Instead, Kabila began a vigorous centralisation campaign, bringing renewed conflict with minority groups in the east who demanded autonomy.

Kabila also came to be seen as an instrument of the foreign regimes that put him in power. To counter this image and increase domestic support, he began to turn against his allies abroad. This culminated in the expulsion of all foreign forces from the DRC on 26 July 1998. The states with armed forces still in the DRC begrudgingly complied although some of them saw this as undermining their interests, particularly Rwanda, which had hoped to install a proxy-regime in Kinshasa.

Several factors that led to the First Congo War remained in place after Kabila's accession to power. Prominent among these were ethnic tensions in eastern DRC, where the government still had little control. There the historical animosities remained and the opinion that Banyamulenge, as well as all Tutsi, were foreigners was reinforced by the foreign occupation in their defence. Furthermore, Rwanda had not been able to satisfactorily address its security concerns. By forcibly repatriating refugees, Rwanda had imported the conflict.

This manifested itself in the form of a predominantly Hutu insurgency in Rwanda's western provinces that was supported by extremist elements in eastern DRC. Without troops in the DRC, Rwanda was unable to successfully combat the insurgents. In the first days of August 1998, two brigades of the new Congolese army rebelled against the government and formed rebel groups that worked closely with Kigali and Kampala. This marked the beginning of the Second Congo War.

In addition, elements of Mobutu's army and loyalists as well as other groups involved in the First Congo War retreated into the Republic of the Congo (Congo-Brazzaville), where they fought in the 1997–1999 civil war.

== See also ==
- Child soldiers in the Democratic Republic of Congo
- Battle of Kinsangani (1997)
- List of invasions
