= Christian Tshiwewe =

Congolese former general (born 1968)

Army General Christian Tshiwewe Songesha
- Born: 1968 (age 57–58); Lubumbashi, Katanga Province, Congo-Leopoldville (present-day DR Congo)
- Allegiance: Democratic Republic of the Congo
- Service years: 1998–2024
- Rank: Army general
- Commands: Chief of Staff of the Armed Forces of the Democratic Republic of the Congo; Republican Guard
- Conflicts: Second Congo War; Kivu conflict; M23 rebellion
- Education: Collège des Hautes Études de Stratégie et de Défense

Army General Christian Tshiwewe Songesha (born 1968) is a Congolese military officer who served as Chief of Staff of the Armed Forces of the Democratic Republic of the Congo. Prior to his present position, he was the commander of the Republican Guard, an elite praetorian guard unit responsible for the security of the Head of State and other strategic security installations in the country. Tshiwewe replaced Lieutenant General Célestin Mbala, who was the Chief of Staff of the Armed Forces from 14 July 2018 until 4 October 2022.

== Biography ==
He was born in the city of Lubumbashi, in present-day Haut-Katanga Province, on 27 October 1968. In 1998, following the ouster of Mobutu Sese Seko by Laurent Kabila, Christian Tshiwewe was among the first infantry officers sent to train in Sudan. He followed that with a staff command course referred to as "Mura", in Likasi, in the Haut-Katanga Province. He received anti-terrorism training in Angola, by Israeli instructors. He attended the Brigade Commander Course at the higher military center in Kinshasa and also studied at the College of Advanced Military Studies and Defense Strategies in Kinshasa.

He served as commander of the 10th Mura Brigade, based in Kinshasa for the four years starting in 2003. In 2007, he was appointed commander of the 13th Regiment of the Republican Guard, based in Lubumbashi, serving in that role for another four years. He then returned to Kinshasa and was promoted to Deputy Commander of the Republican Guard responsible for intelligence and operations. In 2020, he became the commander of the Republican Guard. President Félix Tshisekedi promoted him to the rank of Major General and then later to Lieutenant General.

On 3 October 2022 he was appointed chief of staff of the FARDC, and took office in a ceremony on 13 October. He was the first holder of that post who did not serve during the Mobutu Sese Seko years, and his promotion was part of Tshisekedi's process of filling the military command with younger officers who had "proven themselves."

On 19 December 2024, Tshisekedi dismissed Tshiwewe as chief of staff of the armed forces and replaced him with Lieutenant General Jules Banza Mwilambwe.

On 8 July 2025, Tshiwewe was reportedly arrested by the Congolese government for an alleged coup attempt, along with several other FARDC officers.

== See also ==
- March 23 Movement

Military offices
Preceded by Célestin Mbala	Chief of Staff of the Armed Forces of the Democratic Republic of the Congo; 2022–2024	Succeeded by Jules Banza Mwilambwe
