= LFRD =

LFRD may refer to:

- Lycée Français René Descartes (disambiguation), various schools
- The ICAO code of Dinard–Pleurtuit–Saint-Malo Airport
