= Lycée Prince de Liège =

School in Kinshasa, Democratic Republic of the Congo

Location
- 1, Avenue de la Gombe, Kinshasa (Gombe); 4.3180049°S 15.289709899999934°E

Information
- Established: September 1966
- Website: www.lpl-rdc.com

Lycée Prince de Liège (LPL) is a Belgian international school in Gombe, Kinshasa, Democratic Republic of the Congo. It serves Francophone Belgians and other Francophones of the ages 2–21. It is a part of the Association of Belgian Schools Abroad, in French: Association des écoles à programme belge à l'étranger (AEBE).

Dutch-speaking Belgians in Kinshasa go to a separate school, Prins van Luik School.

== History ==
It was established in September 1966. King Albert II of Belgium laid the cornerstone of the current campus, located on land purchased by the Belgian government. This campus opened in 1969.

== Student body ==
In the 1972–1973 school year, it had up to 2,500 students. That number has never been reached ever after. As of 2015, the school had 894 students. In May 2018, it had 870 students.

== See also ==
- Education in the Democratic Republic of the Congo
- List of international schools
