= Congo Trade Center =

Congo Trade Center (CTC)
- Interactive map of the Congo Trade Center (CTC) area

General information
- Status: Completed
- Type: Multi use, Office, Shopping mall
- Location: Kinshasa, Democratic Republic of the Congo
- Coordinates: 4.2984°S 15.3116°E
- Opening: 2015
- Owner: Modern Construction Congo

Technical details
- Floor count: 18

Design and construction
- Architect: Hamilton Project Management (HPM)

The Congo Trade Center is a skyscraper and shopping centre located in Gombe downtown Kinshasa, Democratic Republic of the Congo. The Congo Trade Center has 18 floors. The building houses a 5-Star hotel, offices, Shopping mall, Banquet hall, Six restaurants and a Casino. The building configuration had been originally designed to comprise two car park basement floors, approximately 2,400m² in area, double floor height, double-level, Retail Space, approximately 1,200m² in area on Ground Floor, two public floors comprising spaces such as Hotel Lobbies, Front-Of-House (FOH) and Administration in Tower A, of approximately 5,000m², eleven 209-key, 5-star Hotel, amounting to 14,430m² area in Tower A and four hotel guestroom floors in Tower B with twelve office floors above).
