= Gombe, Kinshasa =

Gombe
- Commune
- Commune de Gombe
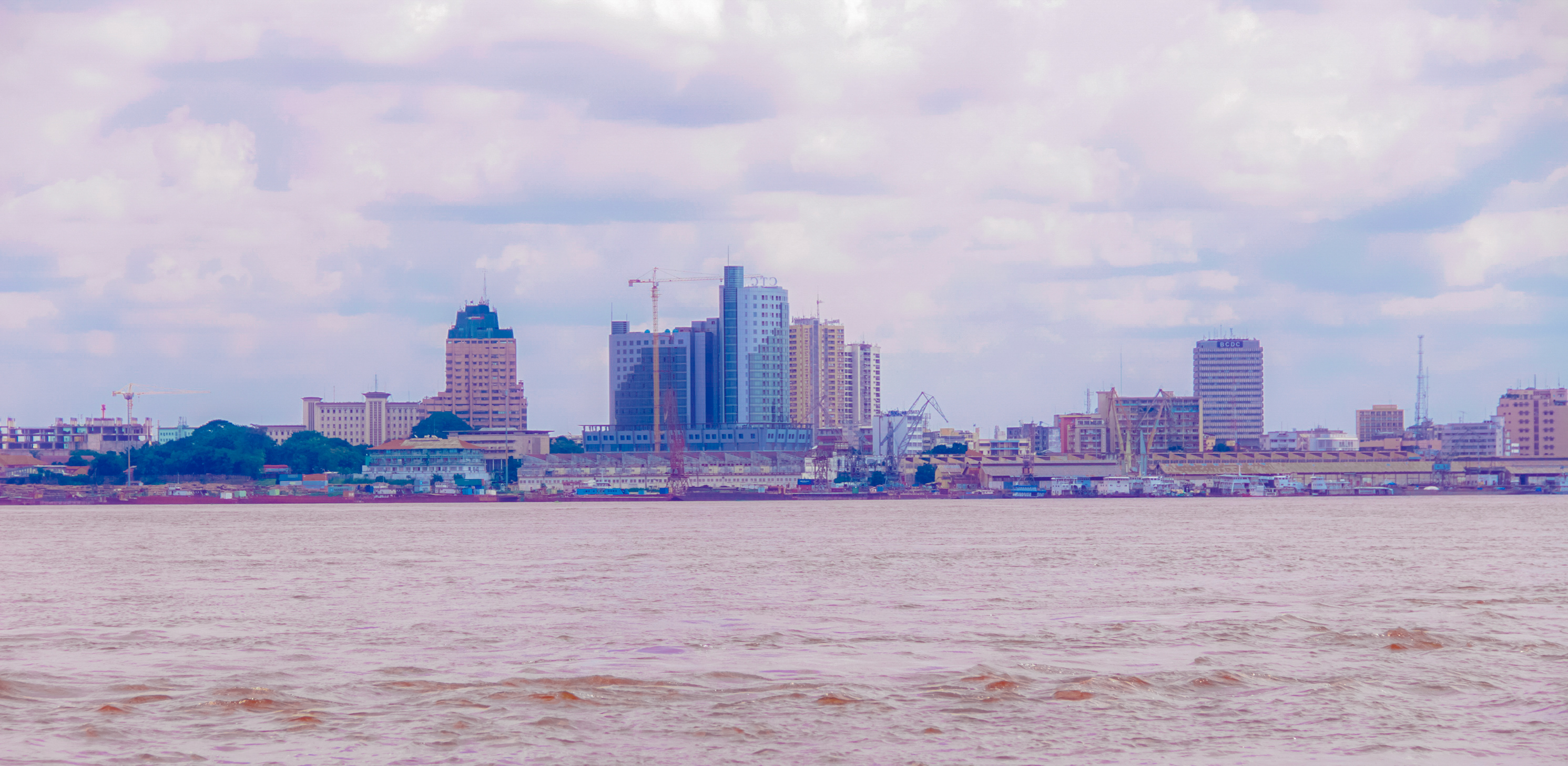
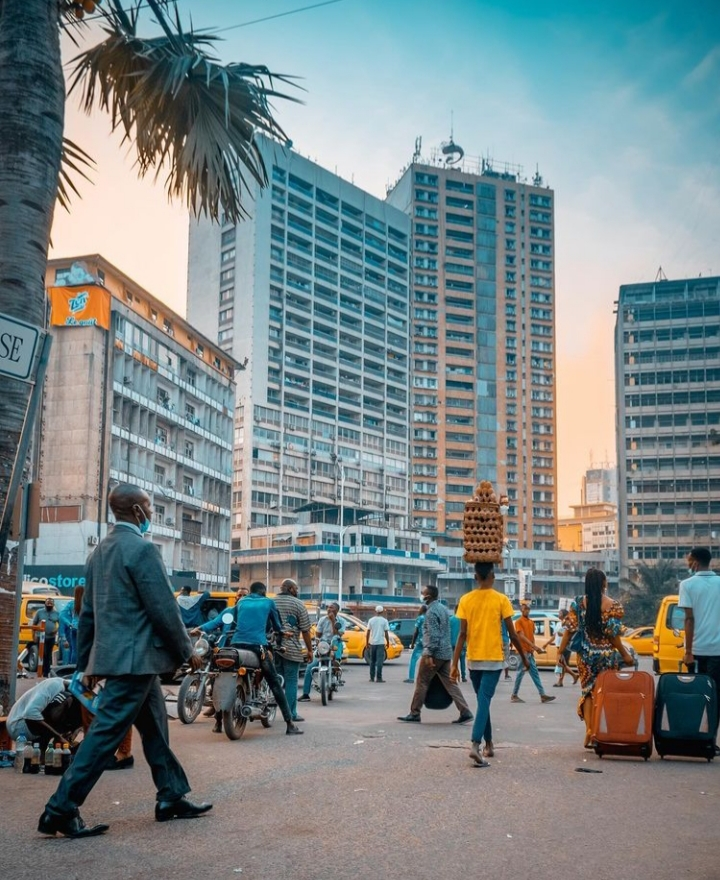
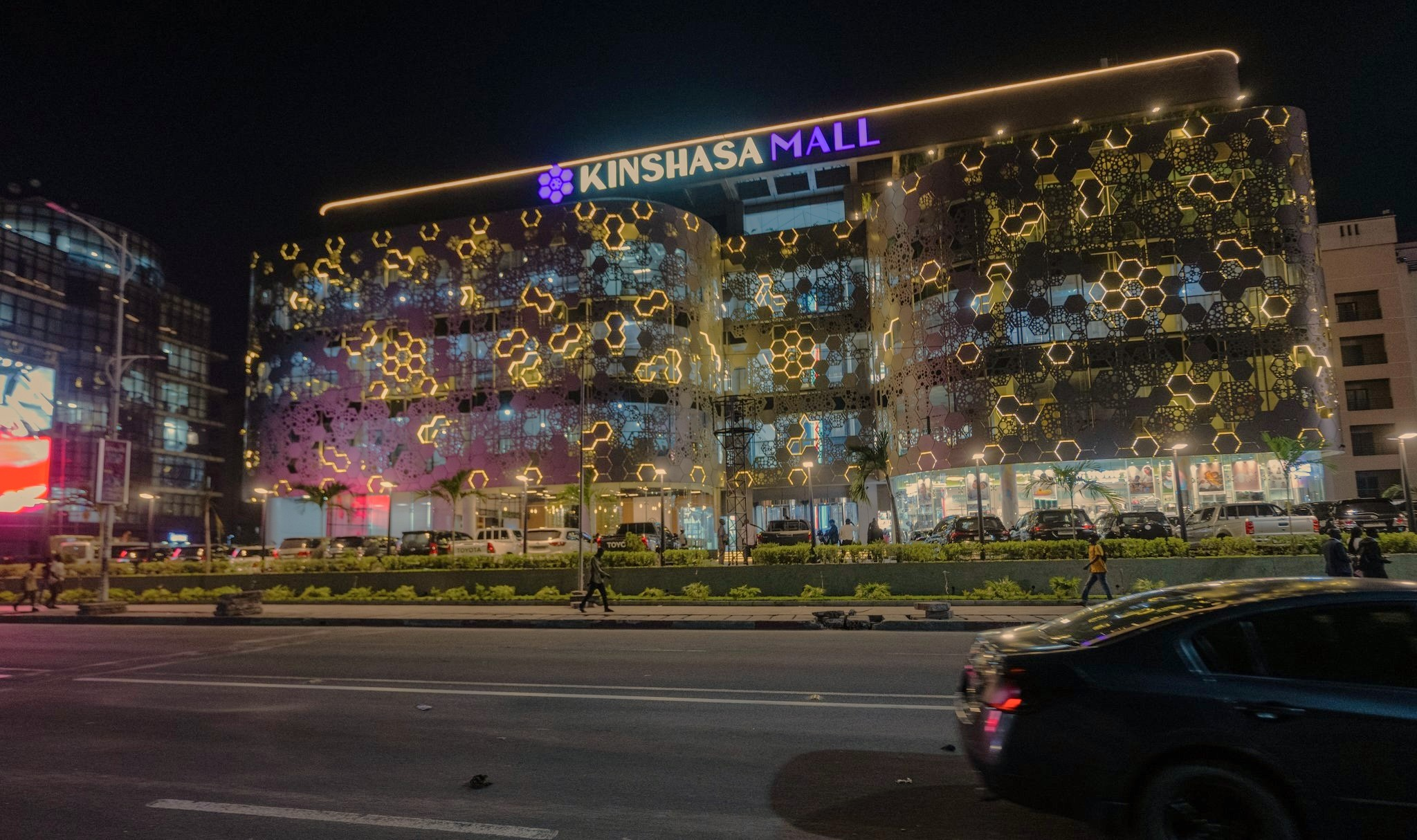
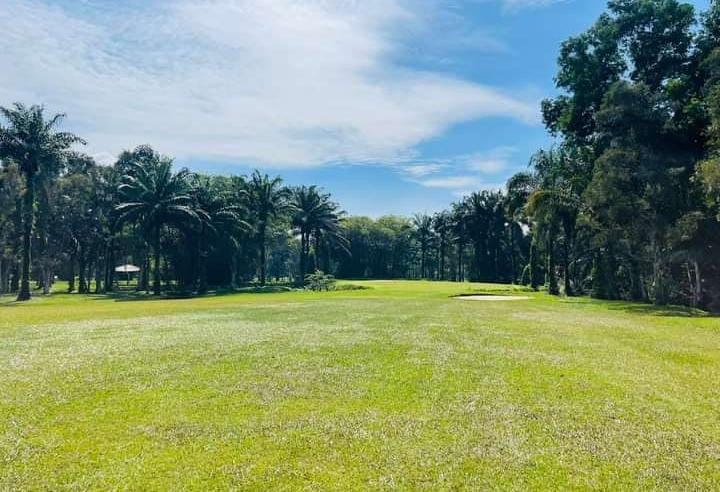
- View of Gombe's skyline Residential apartments Kinshasa Mall Cercle de Kinshasa
- Gombe on map of Kinshasa city-province
- Location in DR Congo
- Coordinates: 04°18′11″S 15°18′12″E
- Country: DR Congo
- City-Province: Kinshasa

Area
  - Total: 29.33 km^{2} (11.32 sq mi)

Population (2015 est.)
  - Total: 89,080
  - Density: 3,037/km^{2} (7,866/sq mi)

Gombe (formerly known as Kalina), also known as La Gombe, or Downtown Kinshasa, is one of the 24 communes of Kinshasa, in the western part of the Democratic Republic of the Congo. Covering approximately 29.33 square kilometers (11.32 square miles), it is the city's eighth-largest commune and had a population of approximately 89,080 in 2015. It is bounded by the Congo River to the north and east, separating it from Brazzaville in the Republic of the Congo, while the communes of Barumbu, Kinshasa, Lingwala, and Bandalungwa lie to the south, and Ngaliema and Kintambo to the west.

Serving as both a residential area and a central business district, Gombe hosts key government institutions, including the Palais de la Nation, the Central Bank of the Congo, government ministries, media organizations, and diplomatic missions. It is also a major financial and commercial center and hosts the headquarters of the United Nations Organization Stabilization Mission in the Democratic Republic of the Congo (MONUSCO).

Gombe originally housed colonial administrative offices, while nearby cités indigènes developed as residential areas for the colonized population. It is now considered one of Kinshasa's fastest-growing communes. According to a 2014 study by Mercer, Gombe is among Africa's most expensive places to live.

== Etymology ==
The name Gombe originates from the Gombe River, which traverses and encircles seven central communes of Kinshasa. The term Gombe is believed to have been borrowed from a traditional title associated with Chief Humbu, a customary ruler who historically governed the region now corresponding to the modern-day Selembao commune, located in the southwestern part of the city.

== Geography ==
The Kinshasa plain bordering Pool Malebo lies between 300 and 320 meters above sea level and forms a crescent about 5 kilometers wide. The N'djili River divides it into two sections: an eastern plain extending toward N'sele and the Lemba Plain to the west. Gombe lies on the Lemba Plain and occupies generally level ground that slopes gently from east to west.

Kinshasa has a tropical wet-and-dry climate under the Köppen classification, with a rainy season generally lasting from mid-September to mid-May and a dry season from mid-May to mid-September. The natural vegetation around Kinshasa consists mainly of wooded savanna, with gallery forests in some areas. In Gombe, much of the vegetation consists of trees and other plants within residential properties, public gardens, and landscaped areas. Trees formerly lining Boulevard du 30 Juin were removed during the road's expansion, although later projects introduced new trees and grass along parts of the boulevard.

Gombe borders the Congo River to the north and lies across the river from Brazzaville. The Gombe River flows along part of the commune's western boundary near Kokolo Military Camp. The commune's soils consist mainly of mixtures of sand and clay, with some coarse material and limited structural development.

== History ==
Before the establishment of European colonial rule, the area now known as Gombe formed part of the fishing village of Nshasa (today Kinshasa), inhabited primarily by the Teke and Humbu peoples along the Congo River. In March 1882, a year after the founding of Léopoldville, Henry Morton Stanley initiated negotiations with Teke chief Ntsuvila (Ngobila) to secure a site for a second station on Stanley Pool. While Stanley was absent upriver, Captain Edmond Hanssens attempted to conclude a treaty for the land, but the chiefs were preoccupied with the activities of the French to the north of the Pool. Negotiations repeatedly stalled until April 1883, when Stanley finally secured an agreement with Ntsuvila. Work began under Alphonse van Gèle near what is now Beach Ngobila, although local resistance led Stanley to appoint his English colleague, Anthony Swinburne, to oversee the post. By early 1884, Swinburne's station was nearly complete, though French agents under Pierre Savorgnan de Brazza attempted to assert French claims based on a prior treaty with the Bateke paramount chief, Makoko. These efforts were repelled by Ntsuvila, who prevented the raising of the French flag at Kinshasa.

During the 1880s, Kinshasa began to emerge as a commercial and strategic post. American commercial agents such as W. P. Tisdel and E. H. Taunt recognized its advantages over Léopoldville, noting its location and navigability. In 1885, Antoon Greshoff established a Dutch trading post for the Nieuwe Afrikaansche Handels-Vennootschap (NAHV), while the Sanford Exploring Expedition, closely tied to Leopold II, expanded American commercial interests in the region. Belgian entrepreneur Alexandre Delcommune arrived in 1887 on behalf of Albert Thys' Compagnie du Congo pour le Commerce et l'Industrie (CCCI), which aimed to develop a railway link between Matadi and Stanley Pool. By late 1888, the railway survey was complete, and in 1889, the Société Anonyme Belge pour le Commerce du Haut-Congo (SAB) established a trading house at Kinshasa, which consolidated Sanford's earlier efforts. Among those present during this period was the young Józef Teodor Konrad Korzeniowski, later known as the novelist Joseph Conrad, who in 1890 commanded the steamer Roi des Belges from Stanley Pool.

The completion of the Matadi–Kinshasa Railway in 1898 transformed the settlement into an important river port linked to the Atlantic. There were also additional infrastructure, such as the 1914 oil pipeline and the telegraph and wireless stations. By the early twentieth century, Kinshasa was described by visiting American naturalist James Chapin as a large town with modern amenities, including hotels, banks, stores, and steamship services. Administrative reforms in 1919 designated Kinshasa as the capital of Moyen-Congo District within the newly formed Congo-Kasaï Province, while Léopoldville retained its status as provincial capital. Throughout the 1920s, Kinshasa expanded rapidly, and it soon surpassed Léopoldville in commercial importance. Colonial policies imposed strict racial segregation. In 1920, a European-only residential zone known as "Kalina Quartier" was established, later becoming the nucleus of what is now Gombe. Plans for a government and administrative quarter were advanced after the Second World War. In 1948, Belgian architect Georges Ricquier presented a master plan envisioning monumental boulevards and official buildings radiating from Kalina Point. His design sought to rival European capitals in grandeur, with Boulevard du 30 Juin envisioned as a boulevard surpassing the Champs-Élysées in scale. These projects entailed large-scale expropriation of African land and the creation of buffer zones separating European quarters from African quarters.

In March 1957, administrative reforms divided Léopoldville into 13 communes, with Kalina officially designated as one of them. Belgian official Robert Van Heck was appointed the first bourgmestre (mayor) of Kalina. After the country gained independence, leadership of the commune transitioned to Congolese authorities, with Mr. Ikama serving as bourgmestre from 30 June 1960 until 1968. In October 1971, as part of Mobutu Sese Seko's authenticité-driven policies, the name Kalina was replaced with Gombe.

== Economy ==
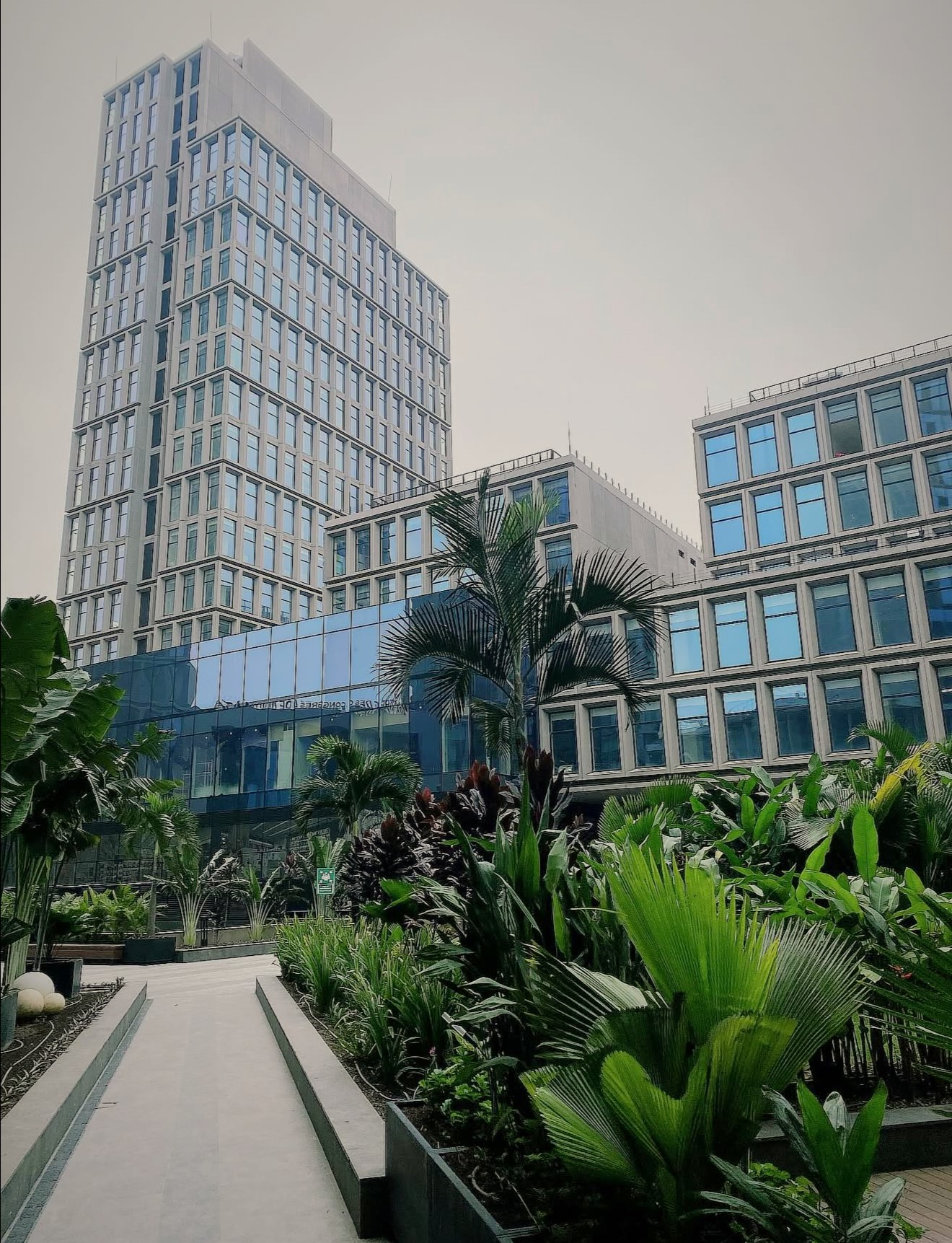
Kinshasa Financial Center

Gombe is Kinshasa's principal administrative, financial, and commercial district. Its economy is dominated by banking, public administration, transportation, hospitality, utilities, healthcare, and other service-sector activities. The commune contains the headquarters of the Central Bank of the Congo, the national water utility REGIDESO, the electricity company SNEL, and the Société Commerciale des Transports et des Ports (SCPT). It is also home to the Kinshasa Financial Center, which houses the ministries responsible for finance and the budget, several revenue agencies, the General Inspectorate of Finance, and other public financial institutions.

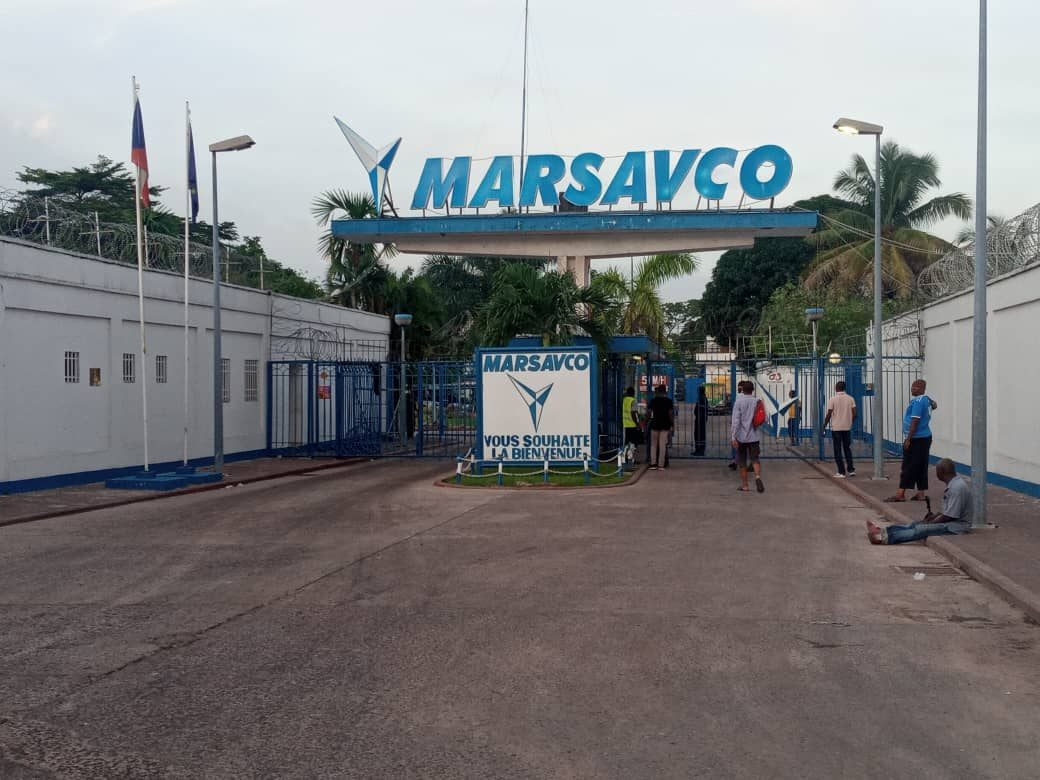
MARSAVCO

The commune's industrial zone, situated to the north and east along the Congo River, hosts a diverse range of factories and enterprises. Among the most notable are Beltexco, TEXAF, MARSAVCO, SEP-Congo (Services des Entreprises Pétrolières Congolaises), MIDEMA, Intraplast, CELCO, SOCIMEX, Sodefor, Stone, Solidiam, and Concorde. Feronia Inc., a multinational corporation specializing in palm oil and agricultural products, also maintains its base in the commune. This industrial corridor connects Kinshasa to regional markets and international trade routes via the river and port facilities. Gombe's economic hub is its central business district, bordered by Avenue des Huileries on the west, the Congo River to the north, Avenue Rwakadingi to the south, and Avenue des Poids Lourds to the east, which accounts for about 70 percent of Kinshasa's socio-economic activity, with a dense concentration of diplomatic missions, multinational companies, and domestic enterprises.

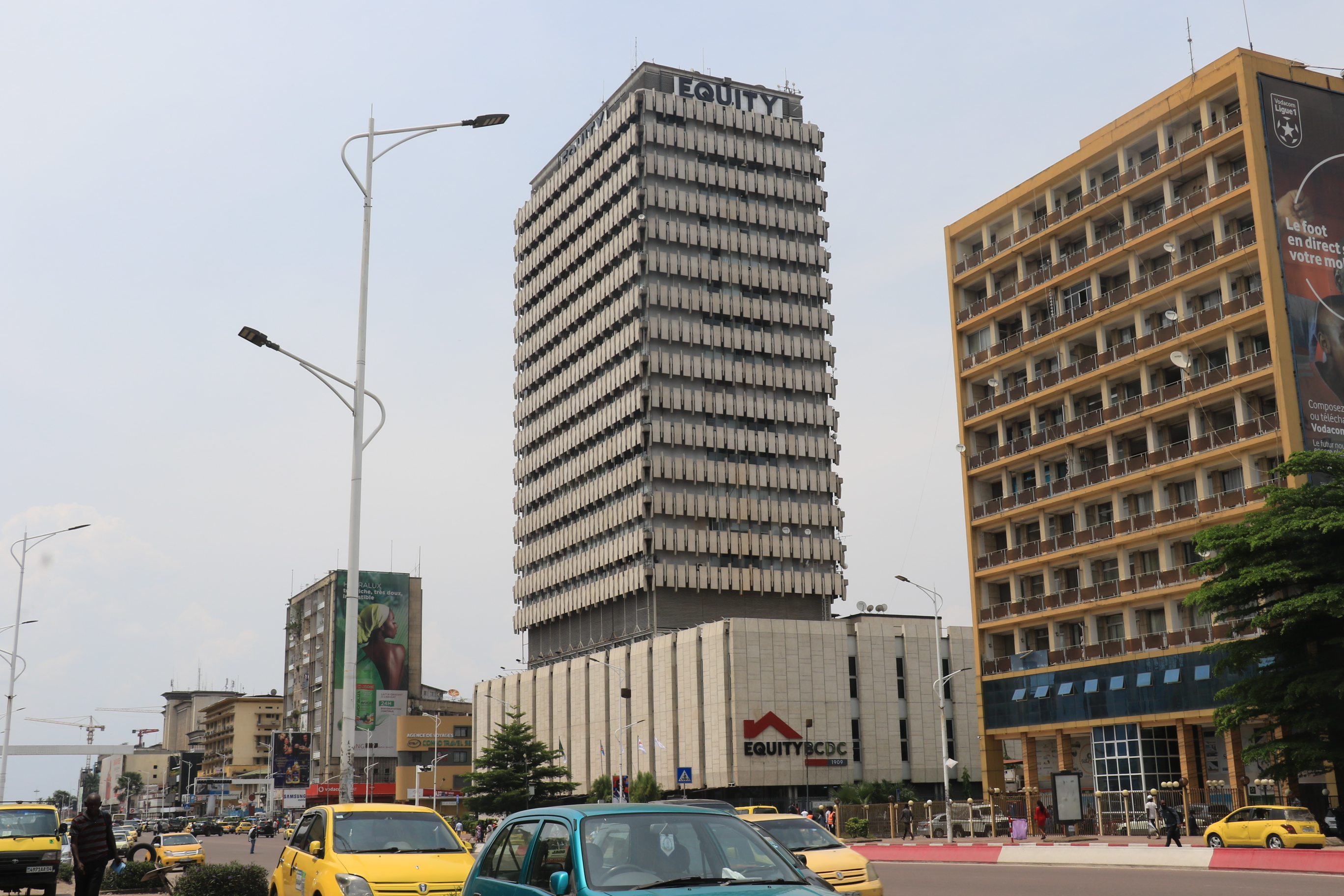
EquityBCDC headquarter in Gombe

Gombe hosts the headquarters or branches of virtually all major financial institutions operating in the country. These include Equity Banque Commerciale du Congo (BCDC), BIC, Banque Internationale pour l'Afrique au Congo (BIAC), BGFIBank Group, Trust Merchant Bank (TMB), Banque Centrale du Congo (BCC), Ecobank, Rawbank, Banque Congolaise, Standard Bank, Bank of Africa (BOA), Fransabank, FirstBank, Banque Minière du Congo, MECREKIN, Western Union, SOFICOM, Solidaire, Société Financière de Développement (SOFIDE), Ami Fidèle, FINCA, and United Bank for Africa (UBA). The commune also serves as a hub for telecommunications and media, with key mobile and internet providers like Airtel Congo, Orange RDC, Vodacom, Africell, Standard Telecom, and Iburst operating from the commune.

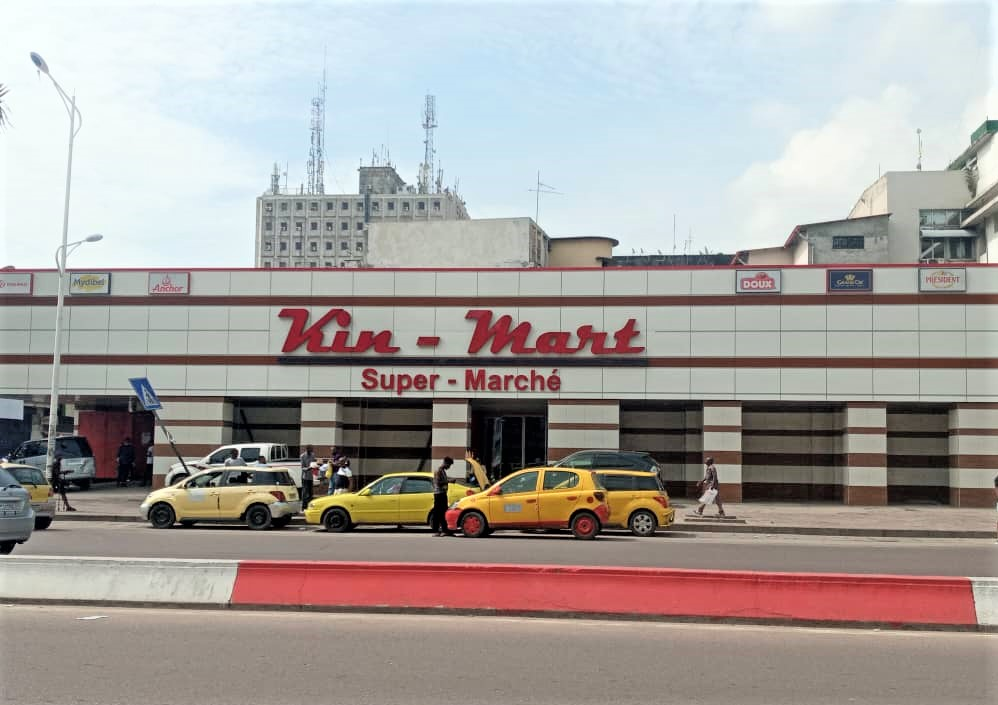
Kin Mart

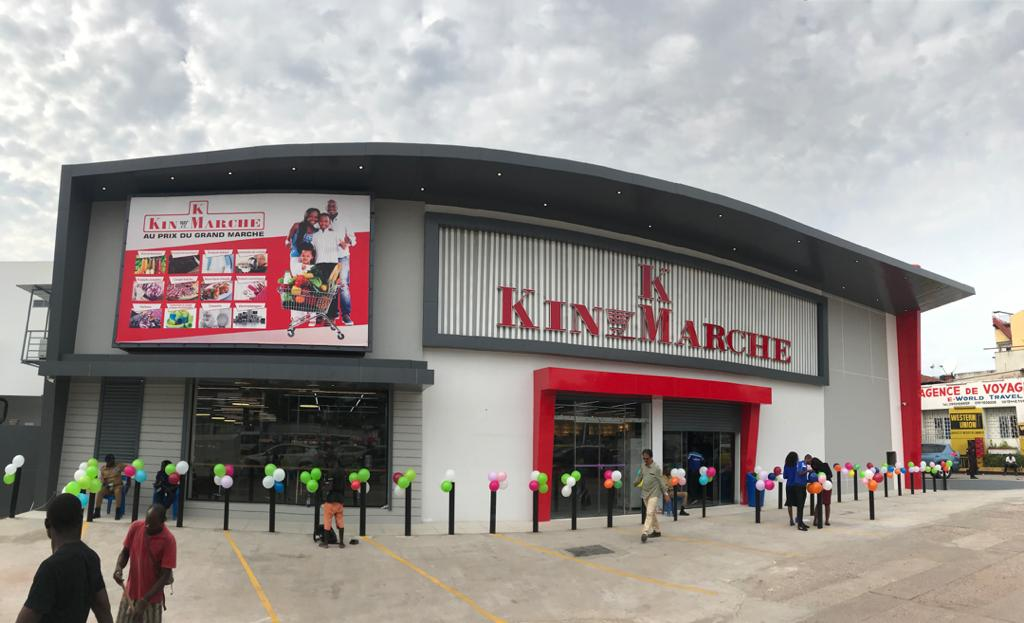
Kin Marché

Since the late 1990s, Gombe has witnessed an expansion in retail and commerce, particularly in the food sector. Much of this growth has been driven by entrepreneurs of Indian descent, whose supermarket chains and retail brands have come to dominate the market. The "mart" retail concept, popularized by Indian entrepreneurs who began settling in the DRC at the close of the 20th century, has become synonymous with large-scale retail. Their presence coincided with the decline or closure of older family-run businesses, such as Hasson & Frère (a Jewish-owned group founded in the 1930s, liquidated in 2018) and the Abdoulaye Yerodia Ndombasi family's Carrefour/Peloustore supermarket. Lebanese chains, including City Market (Sun Rise) and Kin Mart, as well as Greek-owned Hyper Psaro, remain active but face stiff competition from new entrants. Hyper Psaro, historically linked with the French Casino franchise, has pursued reentry strategies through partnerships with Carrefour and maintained its drugstore presence in Kin Plaza Mall. The current retail market is dominated by five major supermarket chains: Regal, a subsidiary of Gay Impex (or Société Gayimpex) founded in 1998 by Indian entrepreneur Parmanand Daswani; Kin Marché, which launched its first store in Gombe in 2004 and has since made the commune its headquarters; GG Mart, also headquartered in Gombe; S&K, which maintains its central base there as well; and Maison Galaxy, created in 2014 by Ashiq Adatia and managed by Popatiya Rahim Suleman. Maison Galaxy, initially focused on cosmetics, now operates more than twenty outlets in Kinshasa under the Galaxy and Shayna brands, having diversified into the food sector. Smaller competitors such as Swiss Mart also maintain a presence.

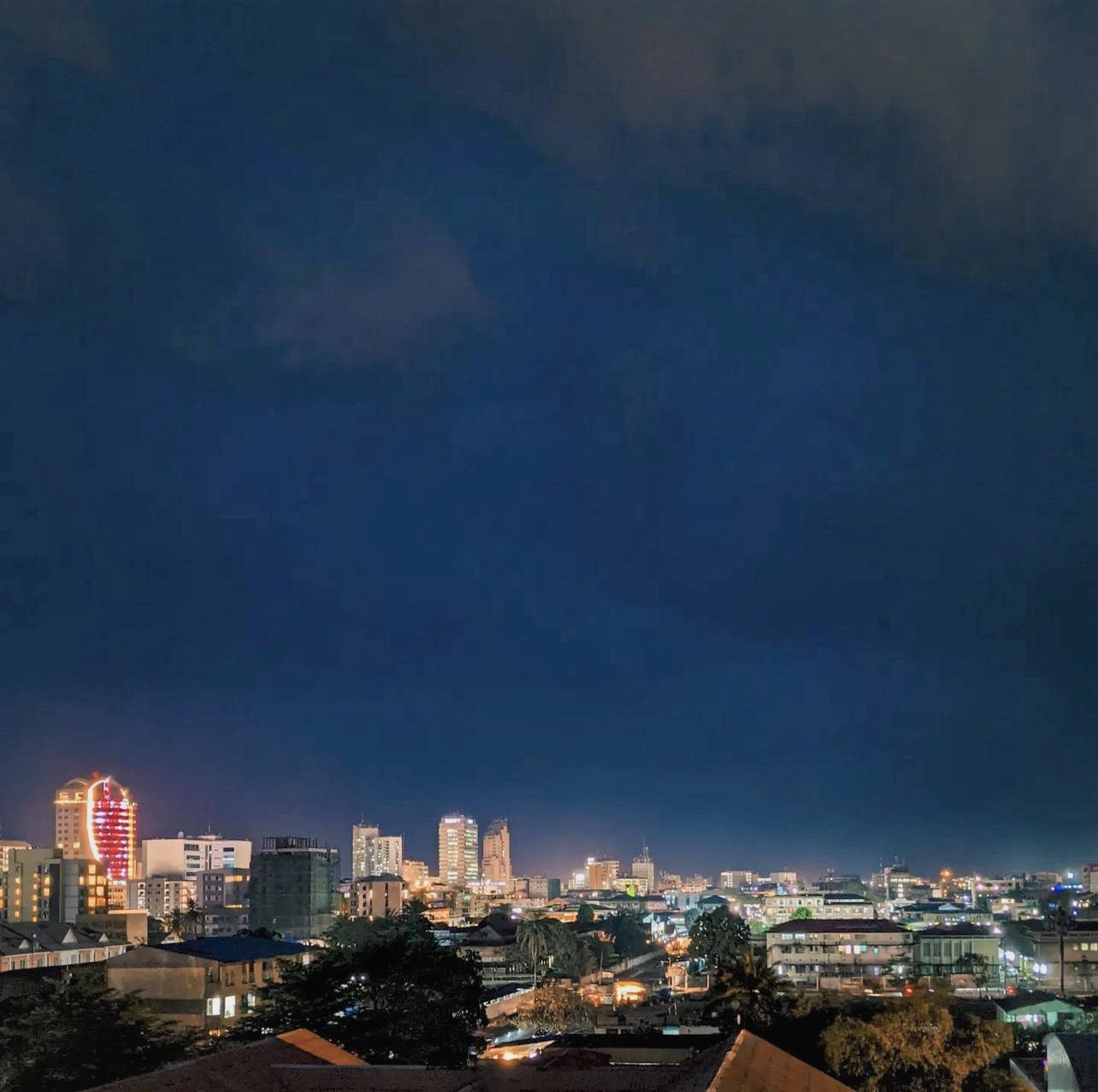
Gombe at night

The supermarket boom has been closely tied to the proliferation of shopping centers and galleries, often referred to as malls. Originally driven by Indian entrepreneurs who combined supermarkets with hotels, restaurants, and service providers, the concept has evolved to include complexes emphasizing boutiques, luxury outlets, and leisure spaces. Notable malls and shopping galleries in Gombe include Premier Shopping Mall, Congo Trade Center, LC Waikiki Flo Tower, Kin Plaza Mall (adjacent to the Kin Plaza Arjaan by Rotana Hotel), Galerie La Fontaine, Gallery Riviera, Galerie Marchande (Memling), Galleria Mall, Galeries Présidentielles, Galerie Pacha, Galerie Mayalos, Galerie du 3Z, Galerie IPGI, Galerie LBK, Galerie Albert, Galerie Botour, and Galerie Massamba.

Of the city's 28 two- and three-star hotels, 52.57% are located in Gombe. All of the city's four- and five-star hotels—including the Venus Hotel, Pullman Kinshasa Grand Hotel, Memling Hotel, and Fleuve Congo Hotel—are also located there.

=== Attractions ===
==== Académie des Beaux-Arts (ABA) ====
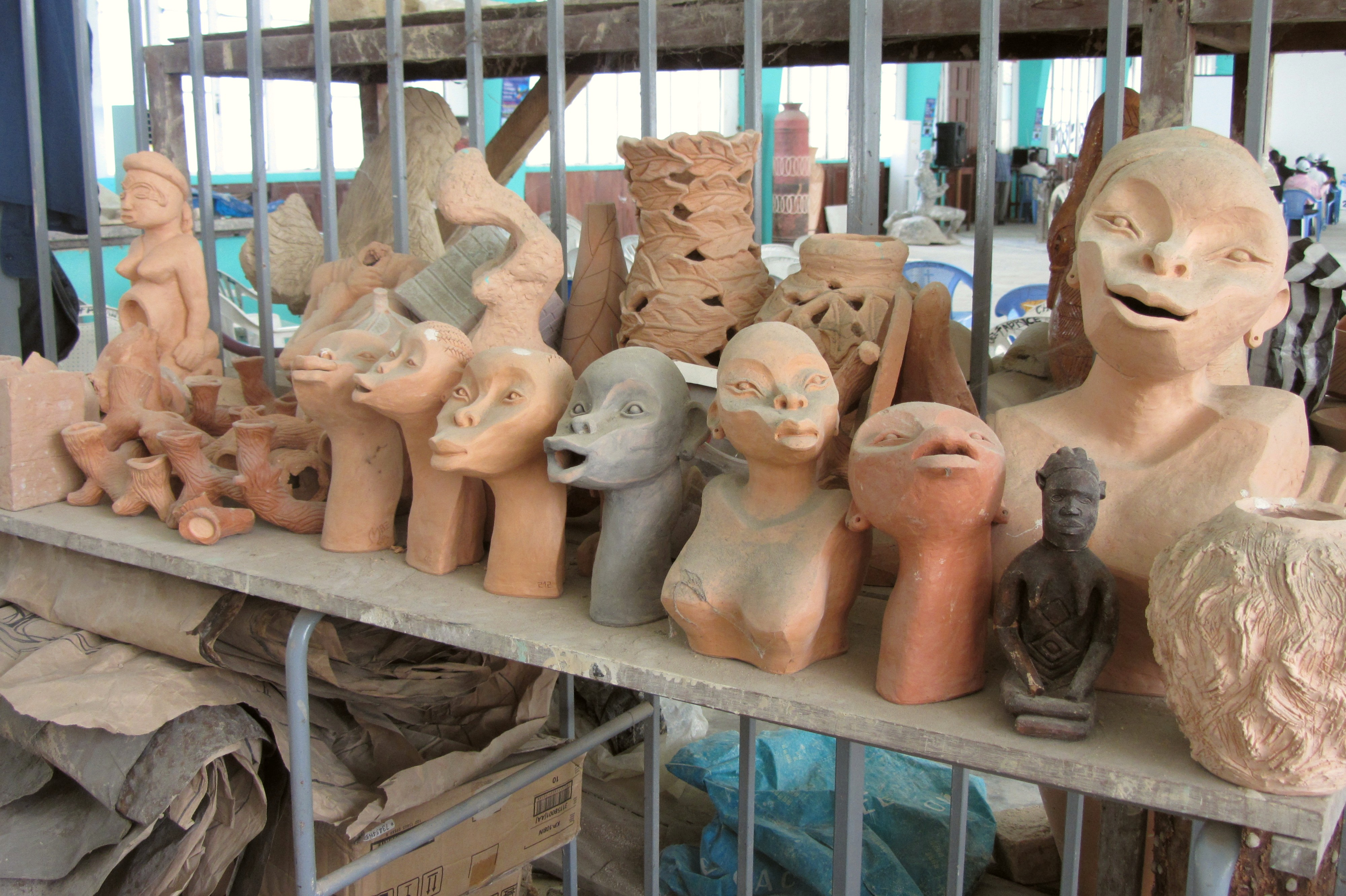
Académie des Beaux-Arts, June 2013

The Académie des Beaux-Arts (Academy of Fine Arts) is an educational institution that focuses on teaching visual and applied arts. The academy encompasses the areas of Avenue de la Libération, Avenue de La Science, and Avenue de la River and is surrounded by a park where visitors can view original sculptures, oil paintings, and other student-made objects on display. Additionally, tourists can witness artists at work and engage in conversations with them.

The academy was established in 1943 by Belgian missionary Marc Stanislas Wallenda in Gombe-Matadi in the Kongo Central province. Originally called "École Saint-Luc," it started as a sculpture workshop due to the abundance of wood in the region. In 1949, the Saint Luc school was relocated to Léopoldville (Kinshasa) and was renamed "Académie des Beaux-Arts" in 1957. Over time, new options were added, including painting (1950), ceramics (1953), Beaten Metal (1971), advertising (1970), interior decoration (1970), and the conservation and restoration of works of art (2013).

Today, the academy provides a training environment and a platform for experimentation and exhibitions in Gombe, allowing students to develop their artistic personalities.

==== Marché Central ====
The Kinshasa Central Market, referred to as the Zando in Lingala, is one of the busiest marketplace in Kinshasa with market activity spilling over into the neighboring streets of the Kinshasa and Barumbu communes. The market is well known for its manufactured goods and larger retail outlets.

==== Jardin Botanique ====
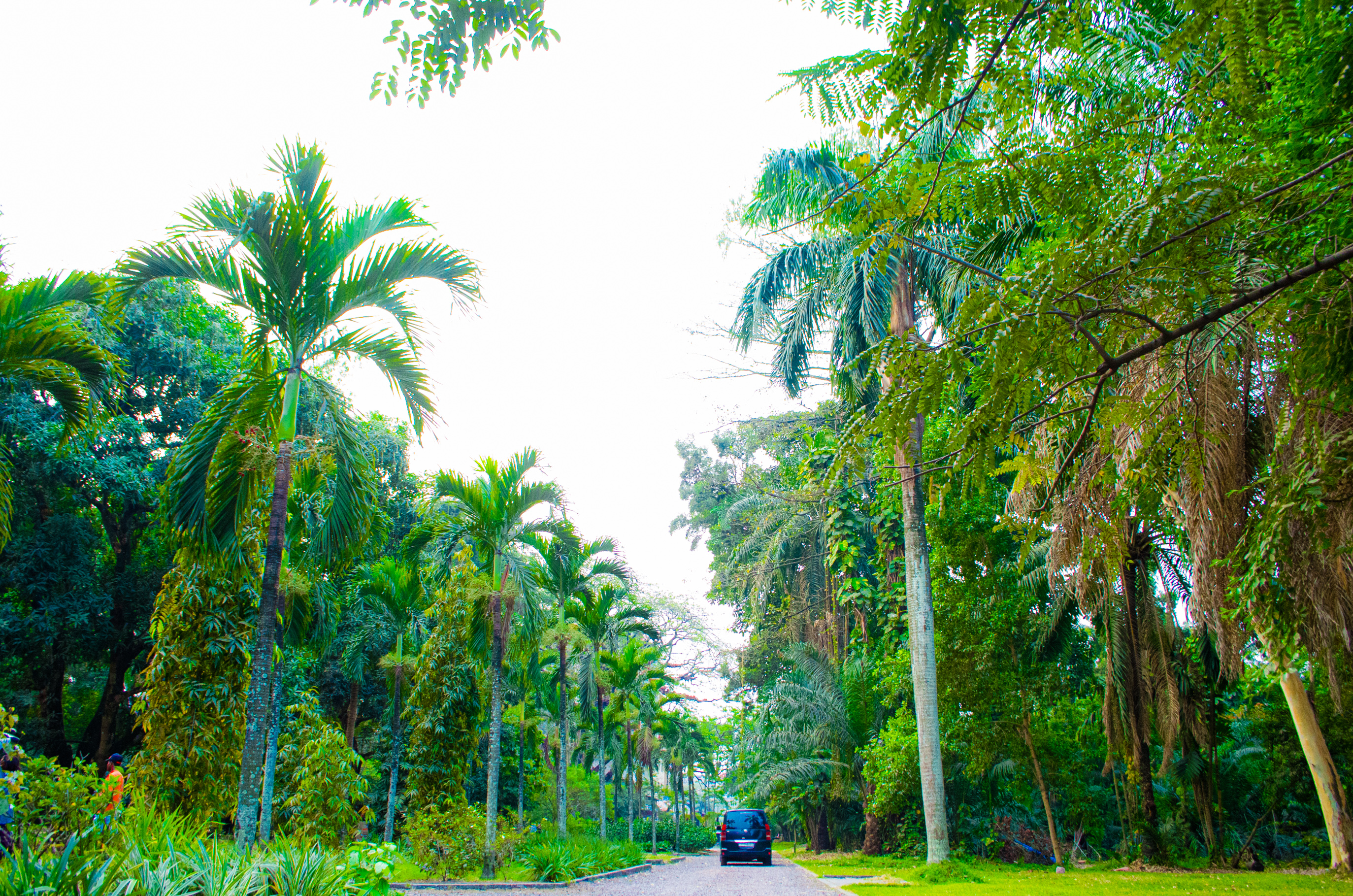
Jardin Botanique de Kinshasa, August 2022

The Jardin Botanique is a botanical garden located opposite the Jardin Zoologique. Covering an area of seven hectares, It features a diverse collection of 286 plant species, including baobabs, mangoes, bananas, papayas, and coffee. The garden is maintained by the Congolese Institute for the Conservation of Nature (Institut Congolais pour la Conservation de la Nature; ICCN). It serves as a platform for environmental education activities and boasts over 100 species of trees.

==== Beach Ngobila ====
Beach Ngobila (referred to by locals as simply Beach) serves as a port for passengers traveling across the Congo River between Kinshasa and Brazzaville. It is located near the islet Ile aux Pierres and the Kinshasa East railway station. The port is managed by Société Commerciale des Transports et des Ports (SCPT) in partnership with the former Agence Transcongolaise des Transports to ensure smooth operations.

==== Mémorial du Soldat Congolais ====
The Mémorial du Soldat Congolais is a memorial located at the FORESCOM Roundabout in Gombe. It was erected to commemorate the Congolese soldiers who were instrumental in shaping the country's history. It represents remembrance, honor, and patriotism, and offers visitors a space to reflect on and pay tribute to the fallen soldiers. Every year on 17 May, it is commemorated with great reverence.

==== Other tourist sites ====
Site name	Ref.
Kinshasa Zoological Garden	
Gécamines Building	
Centre Culturel Boboto	
Centre Culturel Congolais le Zoo	
Bibliothèque Wallonie-Bruxelles de Kinshasa	
Institut Français/Halle de la Gombe	
National Institute of Arts	
Marché des Valeurs	
Poste Centrale de Kinshasa	
Monde des Flamboyants	
Place du Genocost (formerly known as Place des Évolués)	

== Demographics ==
As of late 2012, Gombe population totaled 44,013 residents, comprising 9,309 foreign residents (21.2%) and 34,709 Congolese nationals (78.8%).

Historical population
Year	1967	1970	1984	2003	2004
Pop.	17,890	22,615	17,360	31,307	32,373
±%	—	+26.4%	−23.2%	+80.3%	+3.4%

Population	Men	Women	Boys	Girls	Total	Percentage
Congolese	8,557	7,909	9,079	9,161	34,704	78.8%
Foreigners	3,842	2,157	1,682	1,628	9,309	21.2%
Total	10,901	8,427	10,761	10,789	44,013	100%

Source: Maison communale, Secretariat, Annual Report 2012

Gombe's demographic evolution during 2008–2012:

Year	Congolese population	%	Foreign population	%	Total
	Men	Women	Total		Men
2008	14,030	13,616	27,646	78.5%	3,072
2009	14,627	14,121	28,748	77.7%	4,824
2010	14,978	14,060	29,338	75.5%	5,242
2011	15,146	14,632	29,778	77.5%	4,133
2012	17,636	17,068	34,704	78.8%	3,842

The foreign population demonstrated a steady upward trend over previous years; for instance, in 2008, the number of foreign residents stood at 7,559, increasing to 9,309 by 2012.

Gombe has traditionally attracted a diverse mix of residents from various national and professional backgrounds. The most recent influx includes personnel affiliated with the United Nations and other international organizations, as well as traders and entrepreneurs from Indo-Pakistani, Lebanese, West African, and other Sub-Saharan African communities. Many expatriates are drawn to Gombe, and the adjacent commune of Ngaliema, due to high-quality services, heightened security, and closeness to embassies and workplaces.

Distribution of the population by quartier in 2011:

No	Quartiers	Congolese population			%	Foreign population			%	Total population	%
		Male	Female	Total		Male	Female	Total			
01	Batetela	1,721	1,697	3,418	11.4	548	340	888	10.3	4,306	11.2
02	Cliniques	1,636	1,691	3,327	11.1	538	430	968	11.2	4,295	11.1
03	Commerce	1,717	1,599	3,316	11.1	750	405	1,155	13.4	4,471	11.6
04	Croix-Rouge	1,179	1,156	2,335	7.8	293	225	518	6.0	2,853	7.4
05	Fleuve	763	804	1,567	5.2	-	-	-	-	1,567	4.0
06	Gare	1,804	1,734	3,538	12.0	623	502	1,125	13.0	4,663	12.1
07	Golf	1,922	1,707	3,629	12.1	794	524	1,318	12.8	4,947	12.9
08	Haut-commandement	1,617	1,650	3,267	11.1	596	337	933	11.0	4,200	10.9
09	Lemera	1,114	996	2,110	7.0	236	184	420	4.9	2,530	6.5
10	Révolution	1,673	1,598	3,271	11.0	797	494	1,291	15.0	4,562	11.8
	Total	15,146	14,632	29,778		5,280	3,336	8,616		38,394	100
	%			77.5				22.5			

Among Congolese nationals, 12.1% resided in the Golf quartier, compared to just 5.2% in Fleuve. Foreigners were similarly concentrated in Golf (12.8%), whereas Lemera hosted only 6.5% of them. In 2012, Gombe continued to be the least populated commune, with only 38,084 residents recorded in 2010, representing just 1.8% of Kinshasa's estimated urban population of 9.5 million in 2011. However, more recent figures indicate that Gombe's population nearly doubled by 2015, reaching an estimated 89,080 residents.

=== Education, health care, and transportation ===
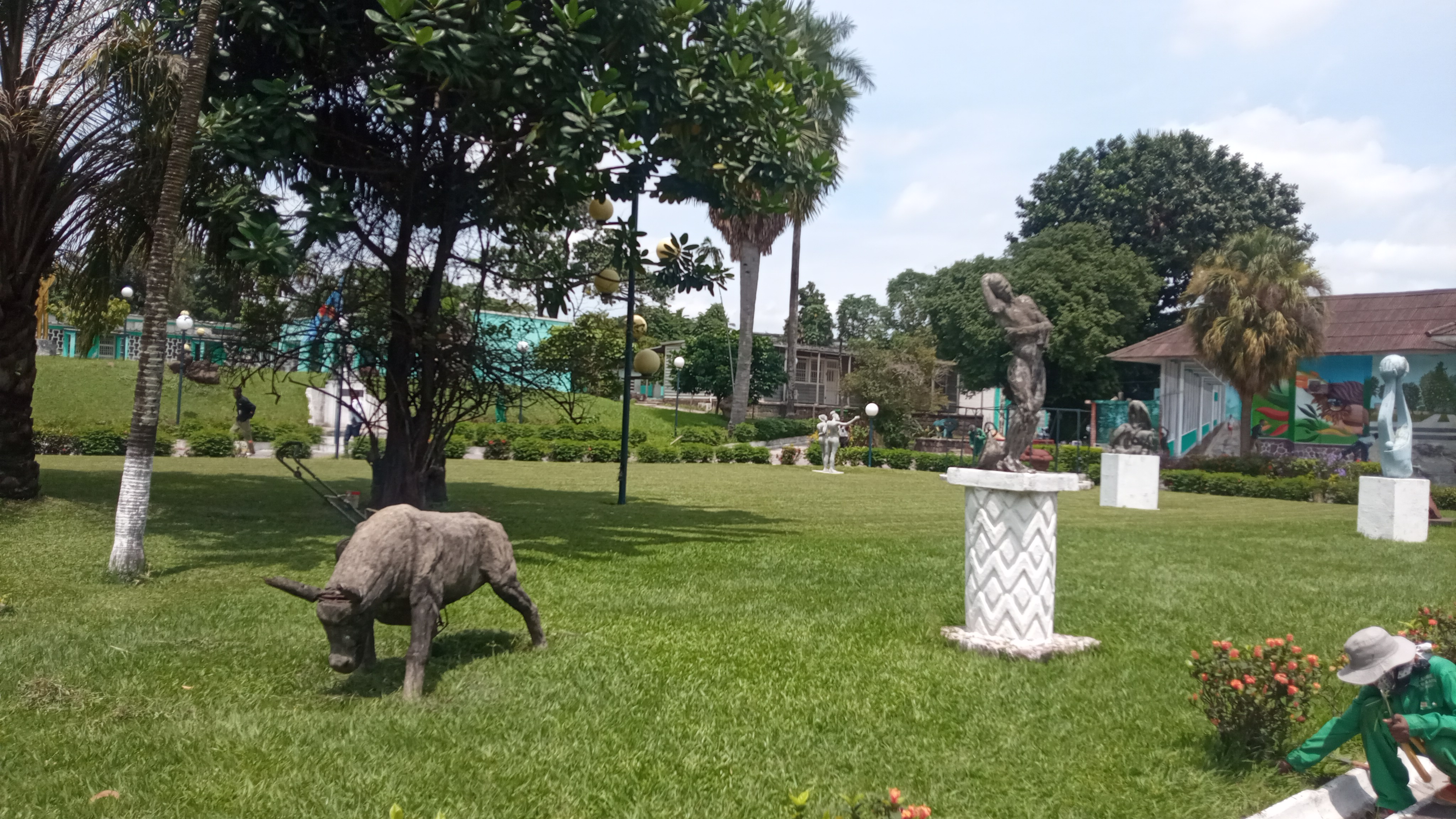
Académie des Beaux-Arts

Gombe has seven state-run higher education institutions, the most of any commune in Kinshasa: the Haute École de Commerce de Kinshasa, the Higher Pedagogical Institute of Gombe (Institut Supérieur Pédagogique de la Gombe), the Higher Institute of Architecture and Urban Planning (Institut Supérieur d'Architecture et d'Urbanisme), the Académie des Beaux-Arts, the Higher Institute of Arts and Crafts of Kinshasa (Institut Supérieur des Arts et Métiers de Kinshasa; ISAM-Kinshasa), the University of Information and Communication Sciences (Université des sciences de l'Information et de la communication; UNISIC), and the Higher Technical Pedagogical Institute of Kinshasa (Institut Supérieur Pédagogique Technique de Kinshasa; ISPT-KIN). These institutions account for half of the city's fourteen state-run higher education institutions.

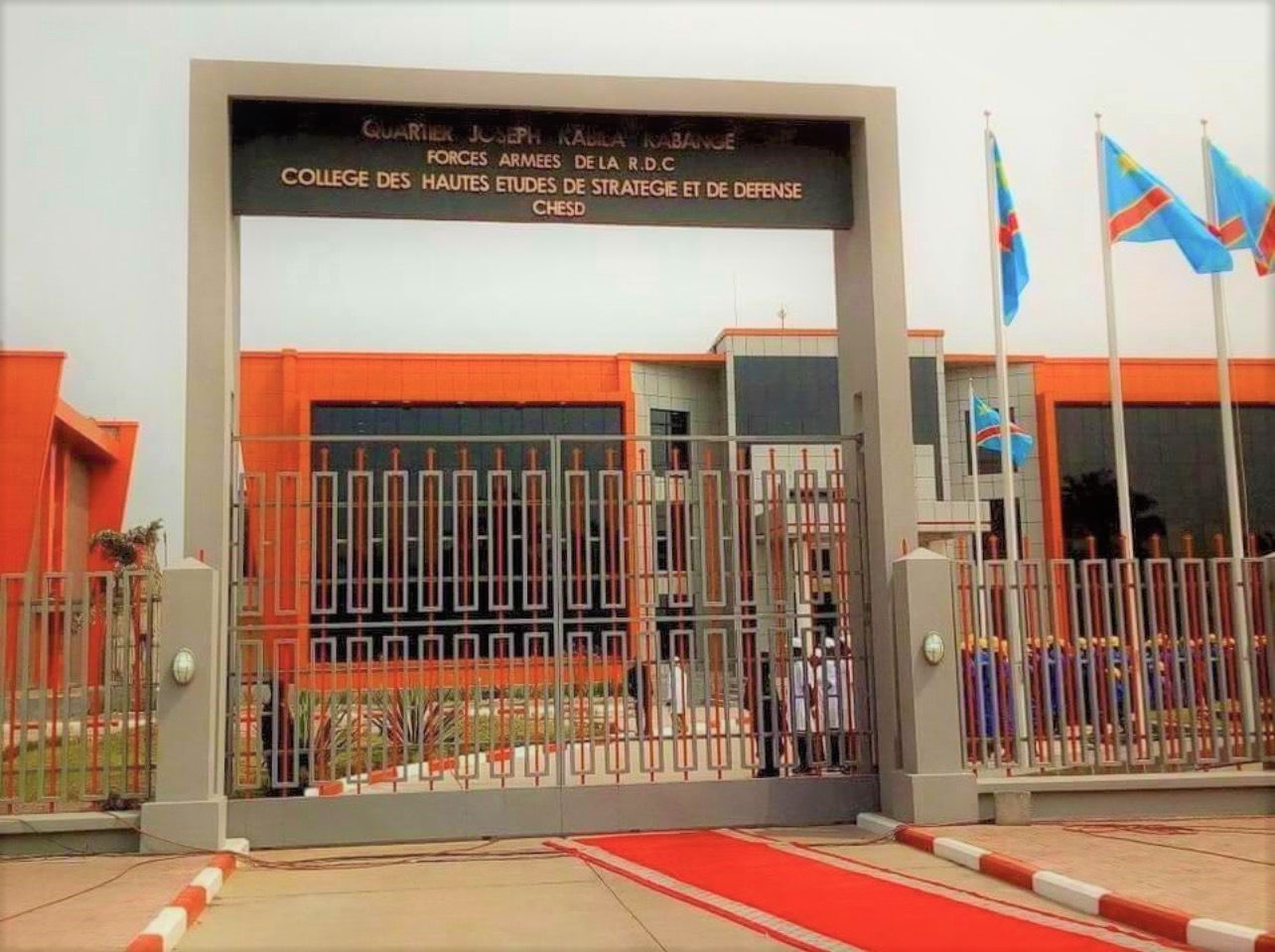
Collège des Hautes Études de Stratégie et de Défense

Other educational institutions include Boboto College, Lycée Bosangani, Lycée Prince de Liège, Collège des Hautes Études de Stratégie et de Défense, Lycée Technique des Filles, Collège Notre-Dame, École primaire Bosembo, and École Maternelle et Primaire Lisanga Bokeleale. The French international school, Lycée Français René Descartes Kinshasa, also has two campuses in Gombe: Site Gombe and Site Kalemie.

The commune is home to some of the city's largest medical facilities, including Kinshasa General Hospital, Ngaliema Clinic, Kinoise Clinic, and Centre Médical de Kinshasa. According to researcher Francis Lelo Nzuzi, Gombe is the only commune in Kinshasa with more than one state-owned hospital.

Gombe is served by several major roads, including Boulevard du 30 Juin and the avenues Colonel Mondjiba, du 24 Novembre, des Huileries, Kasa-Vubu, Kasai, Bokassa, Flambeau, and Poids-Lourds. Boulevard du 30 Juin is a major east–west route that connects Gombe's administrative and business districts to the rest of Kinshasa. The commune has approximately 230 kilometers (140 mi) of paved roads.

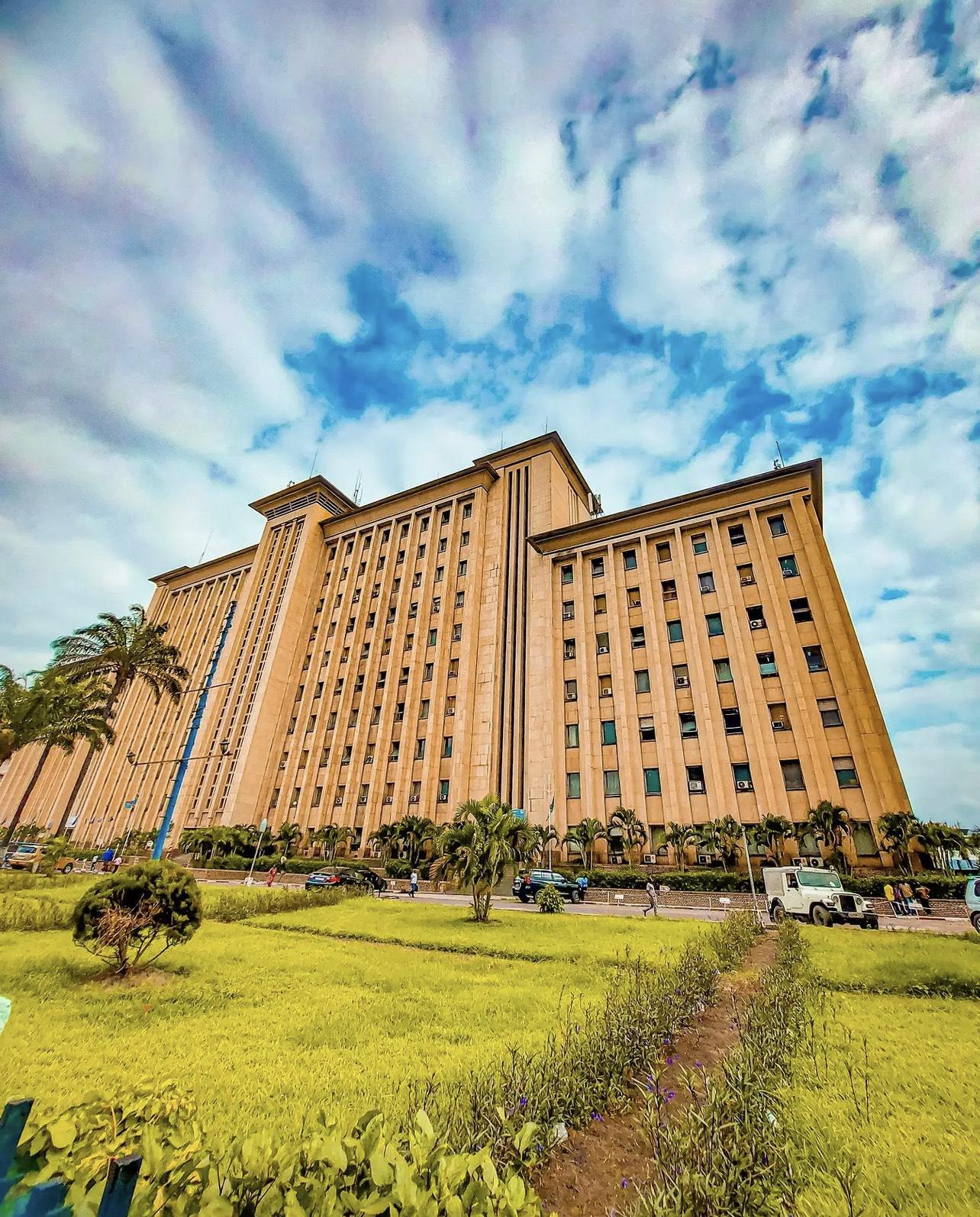
SCPT head office in Gombe

Public transport includes buses, minibuses, taxis, and shared taxis. Many residents commute daily from Kinshasa's more populated residential communes to Gombe because government offices, businesses, schools, hospitals, and diplomatic missions are concentrated there. This daily movement contributes to heavy traffic during peak hours, which generally occur from 7–10 a.m. and 3–7 p.m. Major congestion occurs along several main roads, including Boulevard du 30 Juin and avenues du 24 Novembre, des Huileries, Kasa-Vubu, and Poids-Lourds. Traffic is regulated by the traffic police, while the National Road Safety Commission (Commission Nationale de Prévention Routière; CNPR) oversees road safety.

Kinshasa Central Station is located in Gombe and connects to the Matadi–Kinshasa Railway line to the port of Matadi in Kongo Central. Along the Congo River, Gombe has a public port and several landing facilities for passenger and cargo transport. The state-owned Société Commerciale des Transports et des Ports (SCTP) is also headquartered in the commune.

== Governance and administration ==
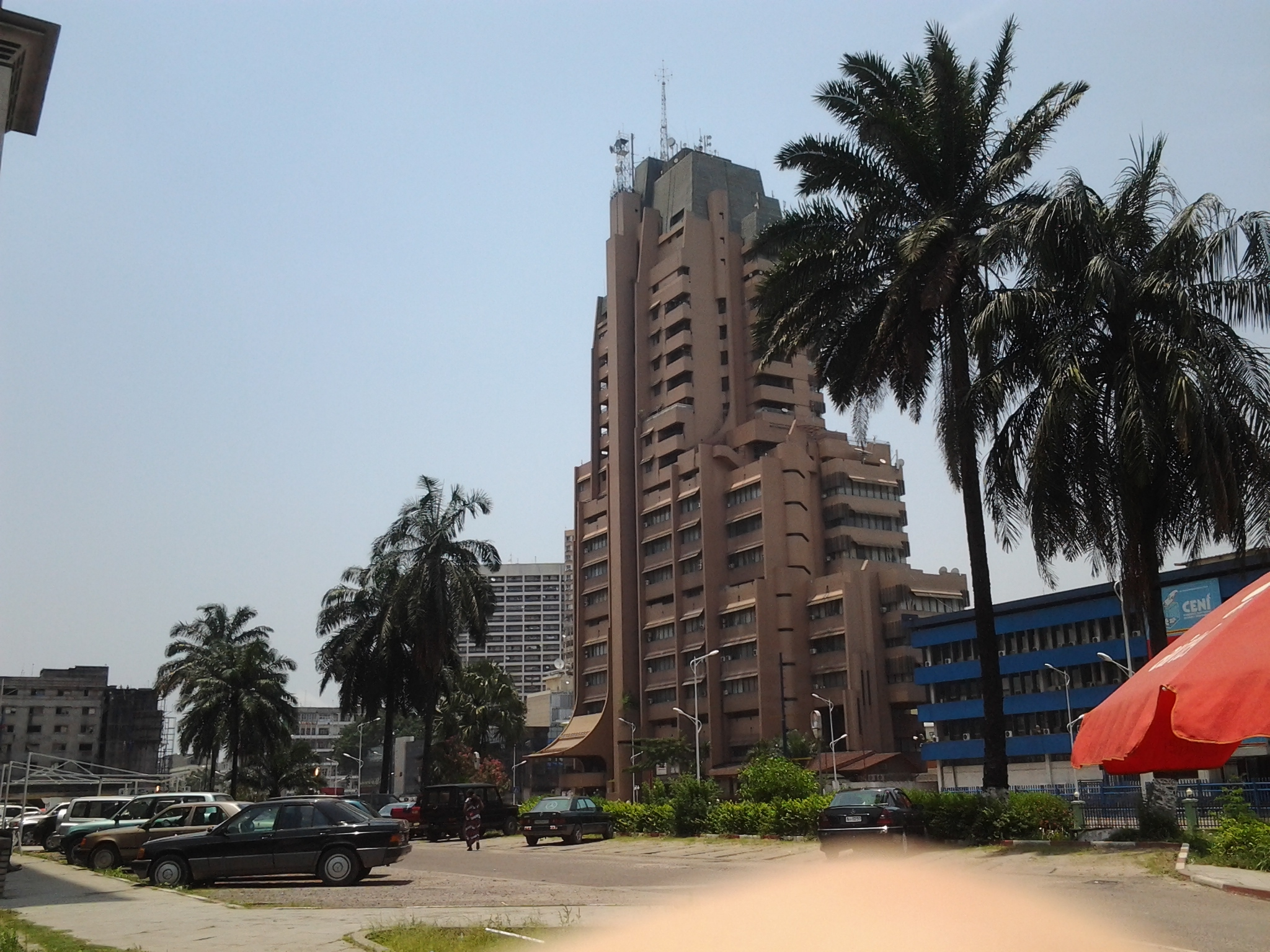
Gécamines Building

Gombe is organized as a decentralized territorial entity (entité territoriale décentralisée, ETD) with legal personality and administrative autonomy. Its governance is structured around two main organs: the Conseil Communal (Communal Council) and the Collège Exécutif Communal (Communal Executive College). The Conseil Communal serves as the commune's deliberative body. Its members, the conseillers communaux, are elected by direct universal suffrage and deliberate on matters of communal interest. The council also indirectly elects the bourgmestre (mayor) and deputy mayor and oversees the implementation of executive policies and programs.

The Collège Exécutif Communal, headed by the bourgmestre and deputy bourgmestre, serves as the commune's executive body. It also includes two échevins communaux (aldermen), appointed based on competence, credibility, and community representation. The body oversees the commune's day-to-day administration and implements council decisions under the oversight of the Governor of Kinshasa.

Gombe is administratively subdivided into quartiers (quarters), which are further divided into avenues. Planned urban quartiers typically follow a formal grid with smaller quartiers, whereas semi-urban or informally developed quartiers often encompass larger populations and constitute much of Kinshasa's urban sprawl. Each quartier is overseen by a local administration that includes a chef de quartier, a deputy, a secretary, a population officer, and a team of enumerators (agents recenseurs). These officials are appointed by the Governor of Kinshasa.

Gombe is divided into 10 quarters and 198 avenues:

- Batetela (18 avenues)
- Fleuve (6 avenues)
- Lemera (19 avenues)
- Gare (25 avenues)
- Révolution (28 avenues)
- Croix Rouge (14 avenues)
- Haut Commandement (19 avenues)
- Golf (27 avenues)
- Commerce (19 avenues)
- Cliniques (23 avenues)

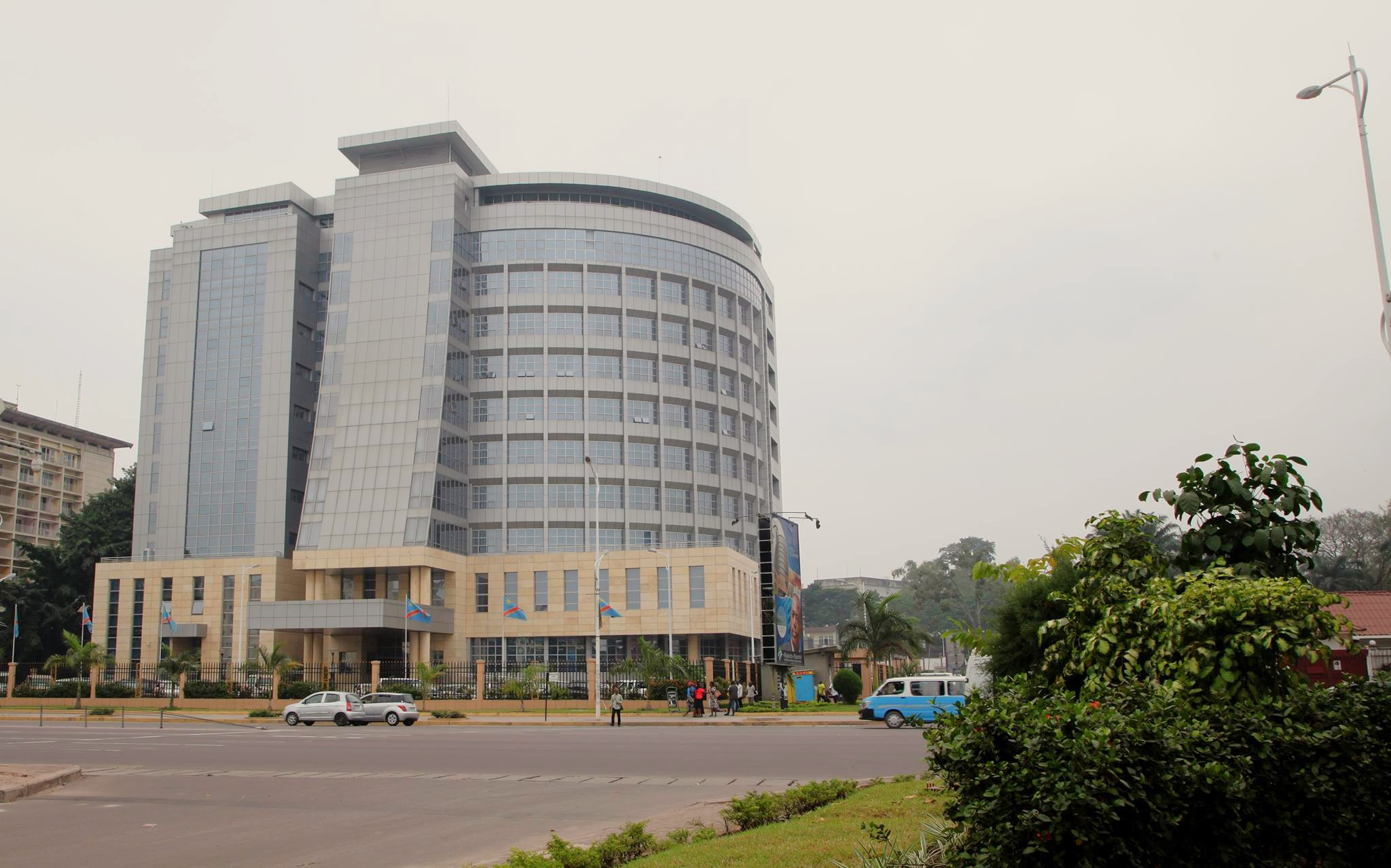
The Hôtel du Gouvernement

The commune's administration hosts decentralized offices representing several central government ministries. Their responsibilities include civil registration, population affairs, economic development, small and medium-sized enterprises, public works, health, environmental protection, culture, urban planning, housing, legal affairs, sports, youth, gender and family affairs, and energy. Gombe also hosts offices of national agencies and specialized state services, including the National Intelligence Agency and the Directorate General of Migration. Other administrative services cover human rights, rural development, industry, the civil service, tourism, political parties, and non-motorized transportation.

The commune contains major national and provincial institutions, including the Palais de la Nation, Hôtel du Gouvernement, Kinshasa City Hall, Palais de la Justice, Institut National de Sécurité Sociale (INSS), and the Kinshasa Provincial Assembly. Gombe also hosts diplomatic missions, media organizations, offices of international organizations such as the United Nations, UNDP, MONUSCO, and UNICEF.

=== Politics ===
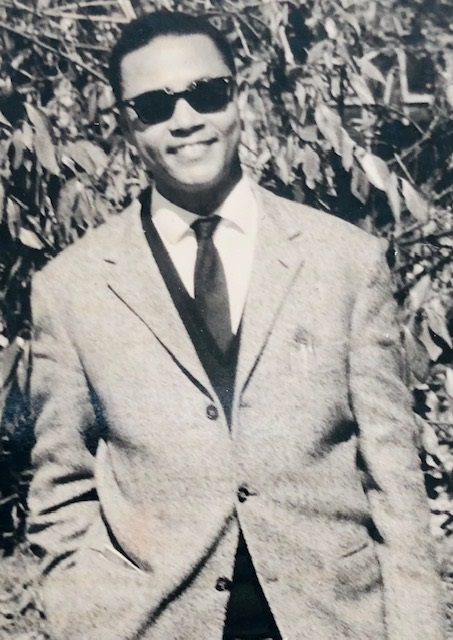
Albert-Joseph Kasongo Wa Kapinga, who served as bourgmestre of Gombe from 1982 to 1988, photographed in Geneva in 1981.

Since 1960, Gombe has been led by several bourgmestres, and, at certain periods, acting officials. Robert Van Hecke led the commune in 1960. Later that year, Elias Nestor Ikamba Wibe replaced him and served until 1968. He was followed by Catherine Nzuzi wa Mbombo (1968–1970), Jacques Kalala (1970–1971), Marie-Rose Kasa-Vubu Kiatazabu (1971–1974), Nkayilu Mia Ntoma (1974–1975), Ilunga Mubengayi (1975–1976), Wunga Shungu Ohokoko (1976–1977), Bena Mukwele (1977), Mabanza Tukalakiesa (1977–1982), Ndala Kabeya (1982), and Albert-Joseph Kasongo Wa Kapinga (1982–1988). Botema Mope and Boloko A Kisenze later served as acting bourgmestres. Kalume Sefu Kayelbe led Gombe from 1989 to 1997, followed by Didier Makabu Mazinda (1997–1999), Mbongompasi Munzebila (2000–2001), Katumbwe Nyeke Amisi (2002–2005), and Justine Kitubu Kamanda (2005–2008).

Dolly Makambo Nawezi succeeded Kitubu Kamanda in 2008. He had served for several years as bourgmestre before becoming Minister of the Interior and Security, Decentralization, and Customary Affairs. His tenure as minister ended after the High Military Court convicted him in November 2019 in connection with the killing of the administrator of the Vijana Reference Health Center.

On 24 August 2019, Fabrice Ngoy Kazadi was appointed bourgmestre of the commune. He remained in the position until Kinshasa's municipal authorities were reorganized in 2022. In November 2022, President Félix Tshisekedi appointed Léopold Manzambi Nzola Tuluka as bourgmestre, with Vinsainte Isambo Apondjo as deputy bourgmestre. In April 2023, Kinshasa governor Gentiny Ngobila Mbaka provisionally suspended Manzambi following a dispute involving Vice-Governor Gérard Mulumba. Ngobila accused him of serious administrative misconduct and disrespect toward the vice-governor and said that disciplinary action would follow. Manzambi later returned to his position on 15 May 2023, but his administration again became the subject of controversy in 2025. On 9 April, the Gombe Communal Council considered a motion of no confidence against him. Eight of the council's nine members voted for his removal, citing allegations that included mismanagement, disregard for legal provisions, improper control of the communal administration, and opaque management. The proceedings were accompanied by tensions between communal councilors and police officers assigned to the mayor's security.

The council's action followed accusations concerning the alleged misappropriation of more than US$20,000 intended for sanitation in Gombe. After the council's decision, Manzambi was given a 48-hour period to resign. When that period expired on 11 April 2025, the council maintained that he no longer had authority to represent or commit the commune in dealings with third parties.
