= Catherine Nzuzi wa Mbombo =

Congolese politician (1944–2026)

Minister of Solidarity and Humanitarian Affairs
- In office June 2003 – February 2007
- President: Joseph Kabila
- Vice President: Abdoulaye Yerodia Ndombasi; Azarias Ruberwa; Jean-Pierre Bemba; Arthur Z'ahidi Ngoma

Personal details
- Born: 19 December 1944 Tshumba, Belgian Congo
- Died: 18 March 2026 (aged 81) Kinshasa, Democratic Republic of the Congo
- Spouse: Madimba Symphorien
- Children: 6

Catherine Nzuzi wa Mbombo (19 December 1944 – 18 March 2026) was a Congolese politician and feminist activist. She was born in the town of Tshumbe in the Belgian Congo. She entered politics in 1967, becoming mayor of the commune of Léopoldville (now Gombe) before being appointed governor of Congo-Central province from 1972 to 1974. After the fall of Mobutu Sese Seko's regime in 1997, she stayed in the DRC. Her involvement in the Mobutu regime led to her arrest in 1998 on charges of treason, and she was imprisoned until 2001. She was appointed Minister of Solidarity and Humanitarian Affairs in June 2003 as part of the transitional government. She ran as the Popular Movement of the Revolution's presidential candidate in the 2006 general election. On 18 March 2026, she died at Clinique Ngaliema in Kinshasa.

== Early life ==
Catherine Nzuzi wa Mbombo was born on 19 December 1944 in Tshumbe, Belgian Congo. Her mother, Alice Mbombo, was the director of a social home and her father, Henri Nzuzi Kamande, was mayor of the commune of Ndesha. Catherine Nzuzi had eight siblings, and her family was Catholic. She completed her primary and secondary education in Luluabourg (now Kananga). Her brother, Emmanuel Nzuzi, was murdered in 1961. When she was 20, her mother died.

== Political career ==
Nzuzi became mayor of the commune of Léopoldville (now Gombe) in 1967. She was appointed governor of Congo-Central province from 1972 to 1974. She was a member of the Popular Movement of the Revolution's central committee, and was appointed its vice-president in 1984. After Mobutu Sese Seko's regime fell in 1997, replaced by a regime under Laurent-Désiré Kabila, she chose to remain in Zaire. Due to her involvement Mobutu's regime, she was arrested and charged with treason. She was imprisoned at Makala Central Prison before being moved to house arrest. She was released on 10 January 2001, one week before Kabila's assassination.

Nzuzi re-entered Congolese politics after her release. She became Minister of Solidarity and Humanitarian Affairs under the transitional government in June 2003. She ran as the MPR presidential candidate in the 2006 general election.

== Personal life and death ==
Nzuzi married Madimba Symphorien, and together they had six children. She died at Clinique Ngaliema in Kinshasa on 18 March 2026, aged 81. Her funeral was held on 31 March at the People's Palace in Kinshasa. President Félix Tshisekedi, first lady Denise Nyakéru Tshisekedi, prime minister Judith Suminwa, and various politicians attended to pay tributes.
