= Mémorial du Soldat Congolais =

Congolese war memorial

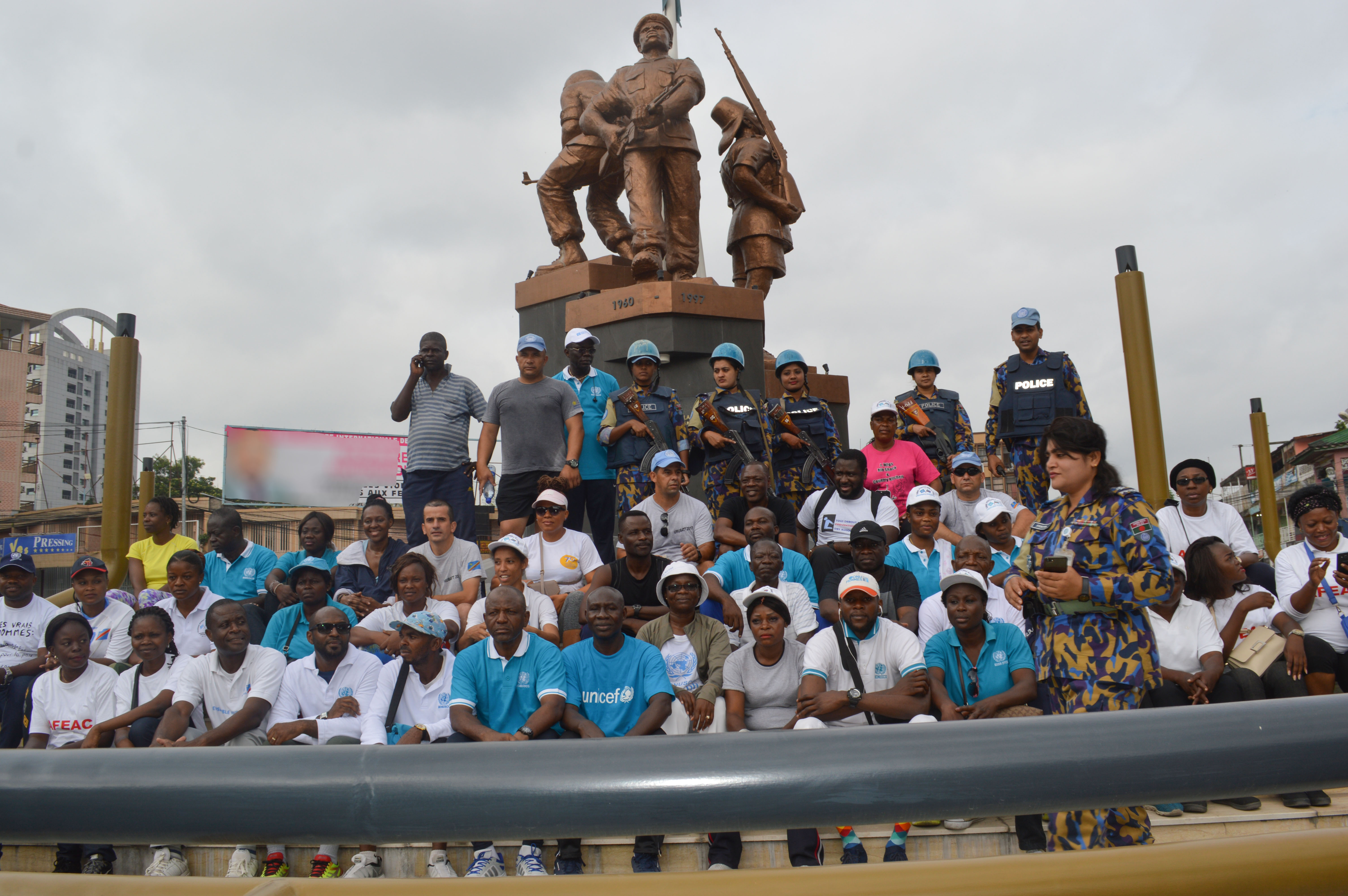
- MONUSCO at Mémorial du Soldat Congolais
- Interactive map of Mémorial du Soldat Congolais
- Location: FORESCOM Roundabout, Gombe, Kinshasa, Democratic Republic of the Congo
- Designer: Van Ntoto
- Builder: Christophe Meko Disengomoka
- Height: 3 m (9.8 ft)
- Opening date: July 28, 2017

The Mémorial du Soldat Congolais (meaning "Congolese Soldier Memorial") is a 3-meter-tall memorial located at the FORESCOM Roundabout in Gombe, Kinshasa. The monument serves as a national tribute to the Congolese soldiers who fought and made the ultimate sacrifice throughout the country's tumultuous history, spanning from 1885 to the present day. Inaugurated on 28 July 2017, by former President Joseph Kabila, the monument was designed by Van Ntoto of Anko Design Corporation and constructed by a Congolese monumental sculptor, Christophe Meko Disengomoka. The memorial symbolizes remembrance, honor, and patriotism, providing visitors with a space to reflect on and pay tribute to the fallen soldiers who played a significant role in the nation's history.

It is commemorated annually on 17 May, in honor of the Alliance of Democratic Forces for the Liberation of Congo-Zaire's entry into Kinshasa. The date marks the day rebel forces captured the city, overthrowing the autocratic ruler Mobutu Sese Seko. Since then, 17 May has been recognized as a day of remembrance for soldiers who fell in battle since 1997. It also pays tribute to the soldiers in a historical line that goes from the Congo Free State, during which the country was Leopold II of Belgium's personal fiefdom, to the present day. The commemoration opens with the words of the FARDC's Chief of General Staff, who reminds everyone of the soldier's solemn duty of self-forgetfulness and sacrifice for the nation. He also reiterates the soldier's motto, "Ne jamais trahir le Congo" (Never betray the Congo), and salutes the President's close ties with the army. The President will honor the occasion by placing a floral wreath at the monument.

== Construction ==
The project was launched by then-President Joseph Kabila and managed by the Chief of Staff, General Didier Etumba. The monument depicts three soldiers who are approximately 3 meters tall. One of the soldiers is walking, another is gazing up at the sky, and the third is poised for attack. As stated by Christophe Meko Disengomoka, whose comments were reported in Les Dépêches de Brazzaville (a publication by ADIAC), the monument commemorates soldiers along a historical timeline that started in the Congo Free State in 1885 and extends to the present. The Force Publique is represented from 1884 to 1960, succeeded by the Congolese National Army (Armée Nationale Congolaise; ANC) from 1960 to 1971, which subsequently became the Zairian Armed Forces (Forces Armées Zaïroises; FAZ) during Mobutu's era, and from 1997 to the present day, the Armed Forces of the Democratic Republic of Congo (Forces Armées de la République Démocratique du Congo; FARDC).

The soldiers are depicted wearing military pants, and the sculptor, Christophe Meko Disengomoka, considered this piece a new experience enriching his 25-year career and expertise in monument creation. The sculptural works he authored and designed are being unveiled gradually, with the Public Force monument being the smallest plinth. After the inauguration, a soldier wearing khaki shorts was unveiled for the memorial, complete with puttees and cartridge belts that were part of the uniform at the time. The sculptor emphasized that producing the monument required specific documentation as it was intended to be a historical and informative work—the soldiers, whether living or deceased, are honored through this monument.

== See also ==
- Reunification Monument
- Christ the King (Lubango)
- Askari Monument
- Arusha Declaration Monument
- Uhuru Monument
- Martyrs Memorial Monument
- African Renaissance Monument
- Fort de Shinkakasa
- Tom Mboya Monument
