= Haute École de Commerce de Kinshasa =

Organization in Kinshasa, Democratic Republic of the Congo

High School of Commerce of Kinshasa
- Former names: Ecole Supérieure de Commerce (1964–1978); Institut Supérieur de Commerce de Kinshasa (1978–2023)
- Type: Public, state funded university
- Established: 1964; 62 years ago
- Founders: Catholic Mission of Scheut and Father Gaston Bogaert
- Students: 29,971 (2023–2024)
- Location: Avenue de la Déliberation, Gombe, Kinshasa; 4°18′57″S 15°17′24″E
- Campus: Urban
- Website: https://heckin.ac.cd/

The Haute École de Commerce de Kinshasa (commonly abbreviated as HEC-Kin), formerly known as Institut Supérieur de Commerce de Kinshasa (ISC-Kin), is a public technical university strategically located on Avenue de la Déliberation in the Batetela neighborhood of Gombe, Kinshasa. It specializes in commerce and related disciplines. Its main goal is to train professionals in areas such as business, accounting, technical studies, and computer science.

Its academic programs comprise general education courses, specialized technical and commercial training, and advanced courses tailored to each area of specialization. Established in 1964 as the École Supérieure de Commerce under the initiative of Father Gaston Bogaert and the Scheut Fathers, the institution has become one of Kinshasa's largest higher education centers, spanning a six-hectare campus and hosting an enrollment of approximately 29,971 students for the 2023–2024 academic year.

HEC-Kin is known for its comprehensive facilities, including academic buildings, a library, student residences, and recreational spaces such as a football field and basketball court. The university operates under the governance of Ordinance Law No. 71-075, promulgated on 6 August 1971, and is supported by a workforce comprising administrative and technical personnel.

== History ==
The origins of Haute École de Commerce de Kinshasa trace back to the foundation of the Higher School of Commerce (École Supérieure de Commerce; ESC) in 1964. Initiated by the Catholic Scheut Mission, under the guidance of Father Gaston Bogaert, the ESC was conceived to address the urgent need for trained middle managers in the commercial, banking, and industrial sectors. The creation of the ESC marked the culmination of a project envisioned in 1958, which had been delayed due to administrative challenges.

In its early years, the ESC lacked dedicated facilities and operated out of the buildings of the Technical and Commercial Institute of Limete (Institut Technique et Commercial de Limete, formerly known as Collège Saint Raphael). Between 1964 and 1966, the ESC functioned as a private institution before receiving provisional accreditation on 8 June 1966, through a decision by the Ministry of National Education and Cultural Affairs. The academic offerings began with a singular commercial and financial section, later augmented by a commercial and consular section in 1968, though this addition was short-lived.

In 1970, the ESC introduced a management secretariat section to provide capacity-level training. In 1971, amidst nationwide student movements, the Congolese government restructured higher education, merging various institutions into the National University of Zaire (UNAZA) through Ordinance No. 71-075 of 6 August 1971. As part of this reform, the ESC transitioned from Limete to occupy the premises of the former National School of Law and Administration (École Nationale de Droit et d'Administration; ENDA). In 1974, a computer science section was incorporated into the curriculum.

In 1978, the ESC was renamed the Higher Institute of Commerce (Institut Supérieur de Commerce; ISC). The reforms of 1981, enacted through Ordinance No. 81-158 of 7 October 1981, conferred full autonomy upon the ISC, establishing its legal personality. The institution progressively expanded its academic repertoire, introducing a bachelor's degree section (2nd Cycle) in 1996 under Ministerial Decree No. ESU/CABMIN/0728 and elevating the management secretariat section to a graduate-level program through Ministerial Decree No. ESU/CABMIN/0729.

On 13 November 2023, during the ceremonial inauguration of the 2023–2024 academic year, the Minister of Higher and University Education formally renamed the ISC as the High School of Commerce of Kinshasa (Haute École de Commerce de Kinshasa; HEC-Kin).

== Organization ==
=== Mission ===
The Haute École de Commerce de Kinshasa's mission is to train specialized executives in the technical field, focusing on adapting commercial, accounting, and IT techniques to meet the development needs of the nation. The institution's academic framework includes a variety of training programs, ranging from general courses accessible to all students to more focused technical and commercial training, as well as specialized courses tailored to specific academic options.

=== Operation ===
The organization and operation of HEC-Kin are governed by Order No. 81-158 of 7 October 1981, which outlines the various governing bodies and their roles within the institution. These include the Institute Council, the Management Committee, the Director General, the Section Council, and the Departmental Council.

==== Institute Council ====
The Institute Council is responsible for implementing the academic and scientific policy of HEC-Kin. It is tasked with making proposals regarding the development of academic and scientific activities and establishing internal regulations, which are then submitted for approval to the board of directors.

- Composition:
  - General Manager
  - Academic General Secretariat
  - General Administrative Secretariat
  - Budget Administrator
  - Section Heads
  - Chief Librarian
  - Representatives of the academic, scientific, administrative, and technical staff
  - Student Representative

==== Management Committee ====
The Management Committee operates under the direction of the Director General and is responsible for the daily management of the institution. It ensures the implementation of decisions made by the Ministry of Higher and University Education, the board of directors, and the Institute Council. This committee also undertakes actions that fall outside the purview of other bodies within the institution.

- Composition:
  - General Manager
  - Academic General Secretariat
  - General Administrative Secretariat
  - Budget Administrator

==== Director General ====
The Director General, appointed by the President of the Republic upon the proposal of the Minister of Higher and University Education, serves as the chief executive of the institution. The Director General chairs both the Institute Council and the Management Committee. This individual supervises and coordinates all activities, ensures compliance with institutional statutes and regulations, represents HEC-Kin in external relations, and reports annually to the Board of Directors on the institution's operations. In times of urgency, the Director General is empowered to take necessary actions, subsequently informing the Institute Council.

The Director General is assisted by:

- An Assistant
- A Secretary
- A Public Relations Officer
- A Security Service
- An Internal Auditor

==== Section Council ====
Each academic section within HEC-Kin operates autonomously, with its own Section Council. This body is responsible for managing and administering the section's activities, overseeing academic training, and ensuring the professional development of students. The Section Council deliberates on matters that affect the section and is chaired by the Section Head. The Section Head is supported by:

- A Deputy Section Head for Teaching, responsible for coordinating teaching activities and the professionalization program.
- A Deputy Section Head for Research, responsible for overseeing research and production activities.

==== Departmental Council ====
The Departmental Council is composed of academic staff, heads of works, two representatives from assistants, and two student representatives. It is led by the Head of department, who coordinates the academic and scientific activities within the department. The Departmental Council organizes scientific meetings and serves as a key body for academic deliberation and decision-making.

== Academics ==
=== Cycles offered ===
The HEC-Kin's educational structure is divided into three main academic cycles: the First Cycle, the Second Cycle, and the Third Cycle. The First Cycle includes a variety of undergraduate programs, culminating in the award of a Licence (Bachelor's degree). The Second Cycle offers a pathway to Master's degrees in specialized fields, allowing students to deepen their expertise and refine their professional skills. The Third Cycle is devoted to advanced postgraduate research, culminating in the award of a Doctorate.

=== Programs of study ===
==== Graduate/Day Section ====
The Graduate/Day Section is designed for young individuals holding state-issued diplomas and seeking to acquire specialized training in business management techniques. This section prioritizes the practical integration of students into real-world economic settings, offering opportunities for internships, corporate visits, and hands-on experience. The program duration in this section is three years.

==== Graduate/Evening Section ====
The Graduate/Evening Section was instituted in response to appeals from local enterprises seeking to enhance the qualifications of their workforce. Tailored to accommodate full-time professionals, whether employed in the private or public sectors, this section offers a flexible evening timetable to suit the demands of working professionals. While originally designed for employees unable to attend the day section, the growing demand has necessitated an expansion of its capacity. Students in this section follow the same academic program as the Graduate/Day Section, with a study period extending over four years.

==== Computer Section ====
The Computer Section focuses on the development of technical skills in commercial and information technology fields. Graduates of this section become programmer analysts, responsible for designing, developing, and implementing software programs that support business operations and technological infrastructure.

==== Executive Secretariat Section ====
The Executive Secretariat Section provides specialized training in office administration, organizational management, and communication skills. The study period for this section lasts for three years.

==== License Section ====
The License Section is a newly established academic track that focuses on the training of graduates in commercial and financial sciences, including accounting, marketing, taxation, and computer science.
