= Célestin Mbala =

Congolese military officer

Célestin Mbala Munsense
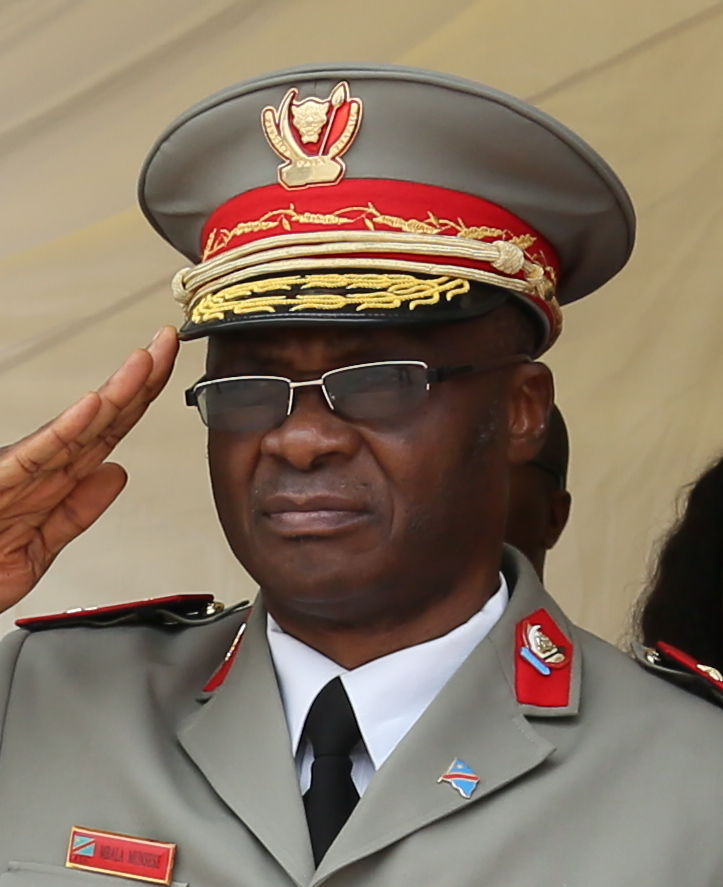
- Mbala in 2016
- Born: 1956 (age 69–70); Lubumbashi, Katanga, Belgian Congo
- Military career
- Allegiance: Zaire (to 1997); Democratic Republic of the Congo
- Branch: Zairian Army; Land Forces of the Democratic Republic of the Congo
- Service years: 1975–present
- Rank: General
- Commands: Chief of Staff of the Armed Forces of the Democratic Republic of the Congo; Deputy Chief of Staff for Administration and Logistics; Presidential Chief of Staff
- Conflicts: Shaba I Shaba II; First Congo War; Second Congo War; Kivu conflict

Army General Célestin Mbala Munsense (born 1956) is a former Congolese military officer who was the Chief of Staff of the Armed Forces of the Democratic Republic of the Congo (FARDC) from 2018 to 2022.

== Biography ==
Célestin Mbala was born in Lubumbashi in 1956 to a Luba mother from Kasaï-Occidental and a Mulubakat father from Nyunzu Territory in the Tanganyika Province. He joined the Armed Forces of Zaire and graduated from the Officers' Training School in Kananga.

Mbala joined the military around 1975 and had been an advisor to President Kabila since around 2007. As of 2009, he was a military advisor to the President and was also the FARDC director of personnel. He told foreign diplomats in Kinshasa in 2009 that the FARDC was in a state of anarchy since the Second Congo War due to the integration of undisciplined and untrained former rebels, and as director of personnel he was taking efforts to try to improve its situation.

He is considered a loyalist of President Joseph Kabila and held a number of high ranking posts in the presidential and military administration prior to his appointment, replacing Army General Didier Etumba as Chief of Staff of the Armed Forces. Before that, he was a long time Chief of Staff to the President's office, since at least 2010, as a brigadier general. In September 2014, during Kabila's restructuring of the army, Mbala was a major general and was appointed as Deputy Chief of Staff for Administration and Logistics.

After Félix Tshisekedi was elected president in 2018, on 21 May 2019 he confirmed Mbala as FARDC chief of general staff, replacing Theodore Mugalu. President Tshisekedi also promoted him to the rank of Army General.

In October 2022, President Félix Tshisekedi appointed Lieutenant-General Christian Tshiwewe Songesha as Chief of Staff of the Armed Forces. Mbala is listed among the officers awaiting retirement.

Military offices
Preceded by Didier Etumba	Chief of General Staff of the FARDC; 2018–2022	Succeeded by Christian Tshiwewe Songesha
