= Albert-Joseph Kasongo Wa Kapinga =

Congolese educator, historian and politician

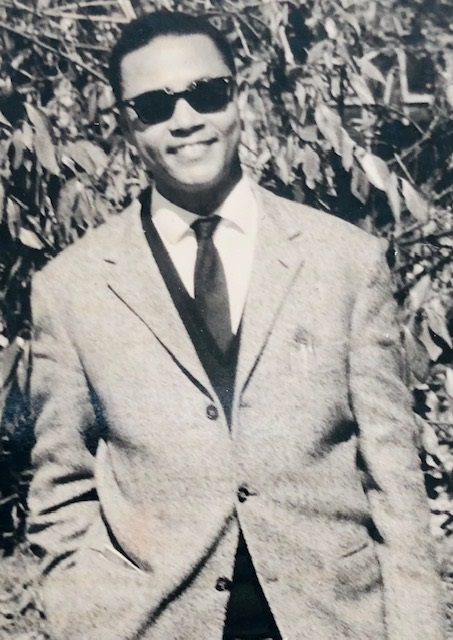
- Kasongo Wa Kapinga in 1981
- Born: 1913; Luebo, Kasai Occidental, Democratic Republic of Congo.
- Died: March 6, 2002 (aged 88–89); Ngaliema, Kinshasa, Democratic Republic of Congo.
- Occupations: Educator, Businessman, Politician, Historian.
- Known for: Founder of Les Ecoles Des Flamboyants (schools) in Kinshasa 1966.
- Notable work: HISTOIRE DU ZAIRE, (Part I 1975; Part II 1981)
- Title: Mayor of the City of Gombe, Kinshasa; Chief Inspector of Education
- Spouse: Maman Kasongo Elisabeth
- Children: Mukendi Kasongo, Albert-Leon Kasongo, Ignace Kasongo, Scola Kasongo, Adele Wakanda Kasongo, Anitou Kasongo Kape, Papito Kasongo, Olivier Kasongo
- Honours: Commandeur de l' Ordre National du Léopard

Albert-Joseph Kasongo Wa Kapinga (1913 – 2002), generally known as Papa Kasongo, was an educator, historian, politician and businessman. He wrote two history books about the Congo (Histoire Du Zaire). He served a term as the mayor (bourgmestre) of the city of Gombe. He founded pre-schools, kindergarten, elementary, and high schools in Kinshasa.

== Early life ==
Albert-Joseph Kasongo was born in Luebo, in the province of Kasai (Kasai Occidental) in 1913. He was raised at an early age by Catholic sisters. He then continued his education in the Kongo Central (Bas-Congo) at the Colonie Scolaire run by a Catholic congregation, the De La Salle Brothers, or the Institute of the Brothers of the Christian Schools (Latin: Fratres Scholarum Christianarum; French: Frères des Écoles Chrétiennes). After completing the Noviciat, he attended Le Petit Seminaire, then Le Grand Seminaire, and became an educator. He later left the congregation to live in Boma (Kongo Central) where he worked and owned a house for several years. Later, he moved to Leopoldville (Kinshasa) in Kalina, where he worked at the Department of Education. From 1961 to 1976, he was the chief inspector of education in Leopoldville (Kinshasa).

== Career ==
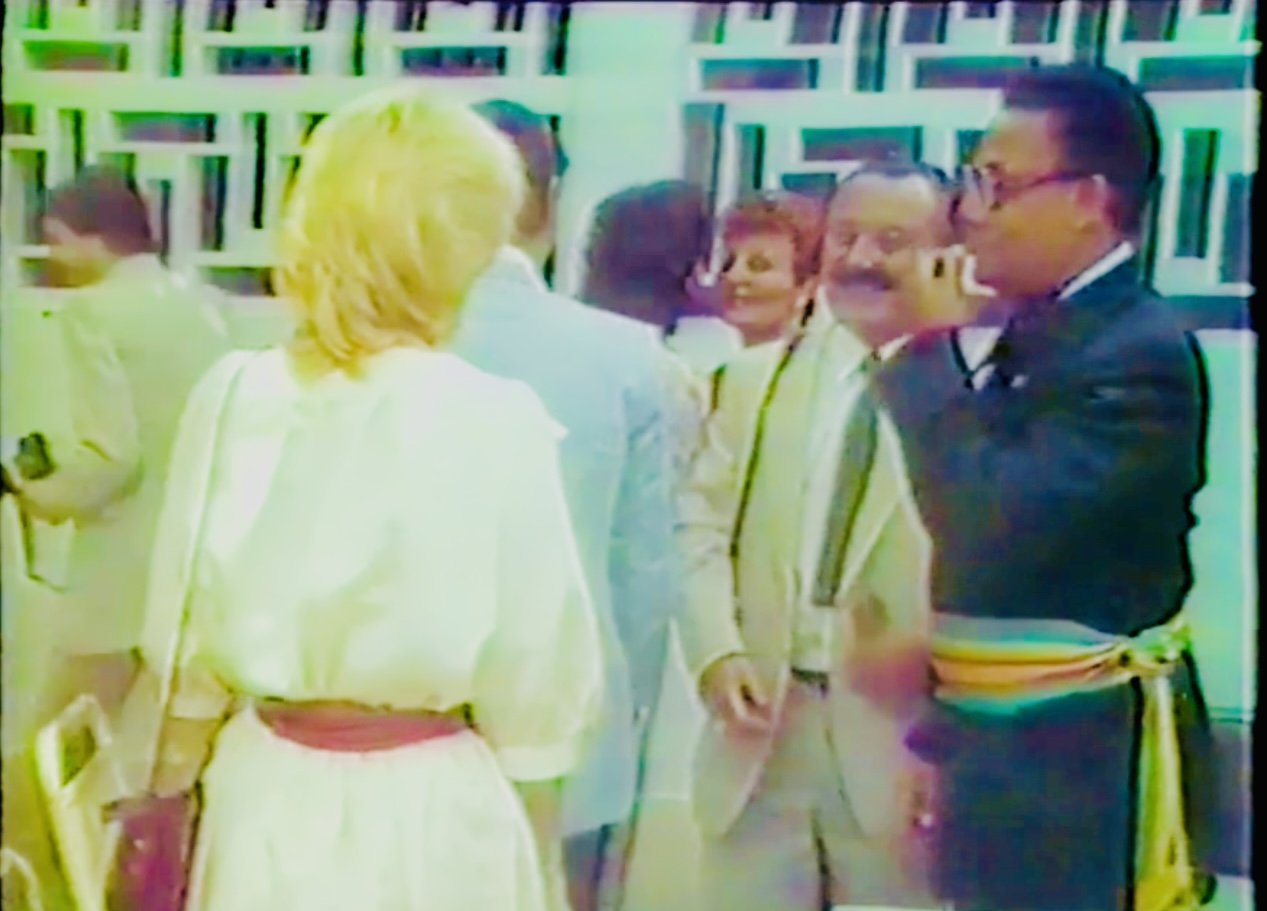
Mayor Kasongo at Gombe city hall, 1982

Albert-Joseph Kasongo Wa Kapinga first worked as a teacher in Kongo Central. As a young adult, he continued his impeccable career in the education field. After receiving a scholarship to pursue higher education at the University in Geneva, Switzerland, he returned to his native country and was promoted to chief inspector of Elementary education for Leopoldville (Kinshasa). In 1966, he founded Les Ecoles Des Flamboyants, one of the first private schools in the country in Kalina (Gombe). He also became a member of the municipal city council of Gombe in Kinshasa for several years. From 1982 to 1988, he was elected and ran successfully for office as the 4th mayor of the City of Gombe, downtown Kinshasa. Gombe is the major city in the Democratic Republic of Congo, where the presidency of the Republic at the Palais de la Nation, the Central Bank, and numerous national government offices, media agencies, and diplomatic embassies are located. It also hosts major financial institutions, business centers, and the best hotels and hospitals in the Democratic Republic of Congo.

Additionally, it's important to note that Albert-Joseph Kasongo Wa Kapinga received one of the highest commendations from the president of the Republic, Commander of the National Order of the Leopard, for his endless work in education and creating jobs in the community.

== Legacy ==
Albert-Joseph Kasongo Wa Kapinga wrote two history books "Histoire Du Zaire" which was written in two parts, about the history of the Democratic Republic of Congo. The two books are used in schools in the Democratic Republic of Congo, as well as for reference materials in high schools and universities worldwide. As a teacher, he taught notable figures such as Joseph Diangienda, son of Simon Kimbangu, founder and spiritual leader of the Kimbangiust Church.

He was one of the founding members and a one-term president of ASBL, La Fraternité, a non-profit organization that oversaw several schools of the De La Salle Brothers in Kinshasa and other provinces in the Democratic Republic of Congo. He was a member of ASSANEF (Association des Anciens Élèves de Frère). He was also a member of the Bana Boma Association for residents of Boma.

== Works ==
- HISTOIRE DU ZAIRE, Histoire 5eme primaire (1975; Editions RENAPI)
- HISTOIRE DU ZAIRE, Histoire 6eme primaire (1981; Editions Treviglio, Italie)
