= Le Premier, Kinshasa =

Shopping mall in Gombe, Kinshasa

Le Premier
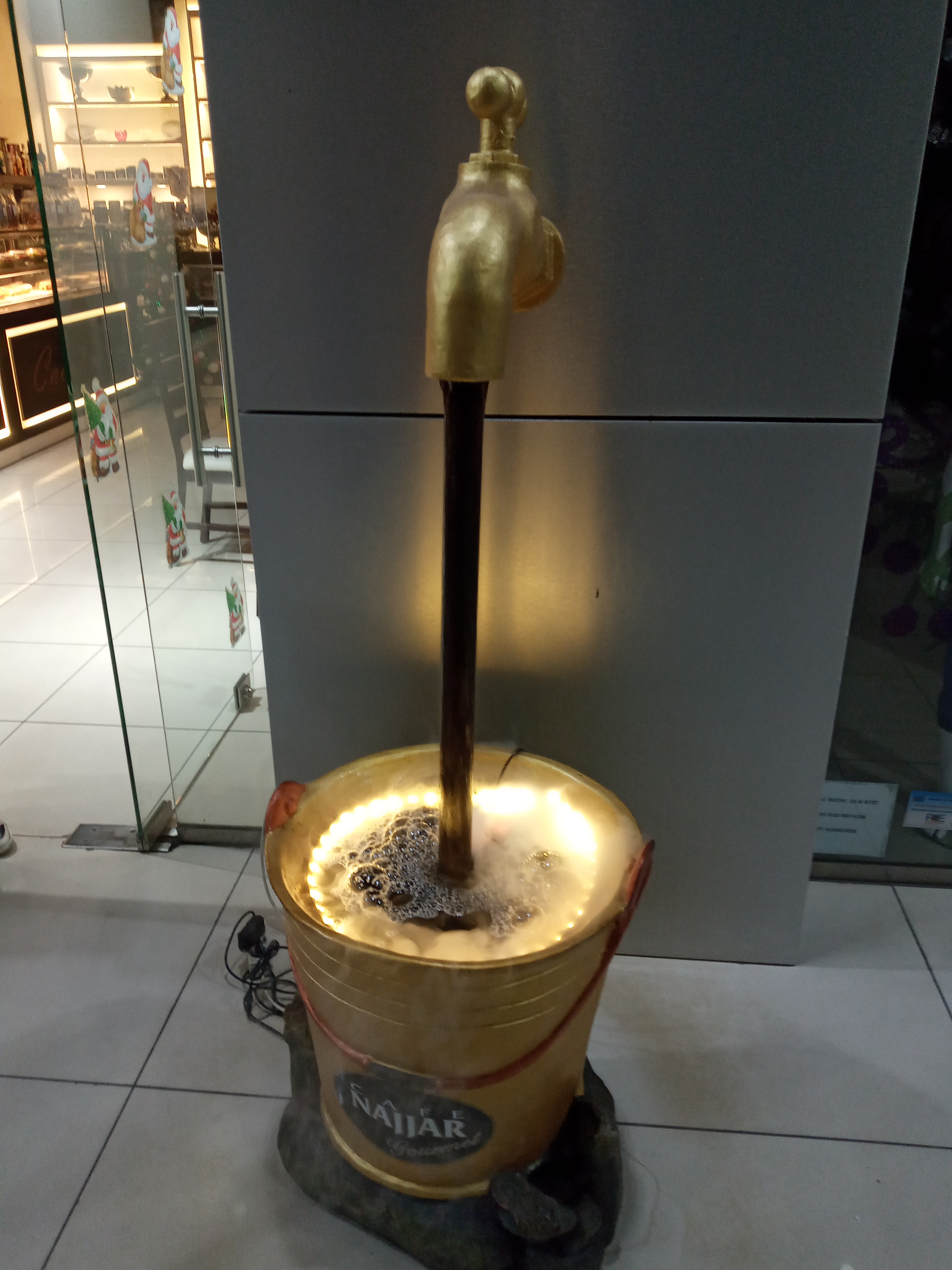
- Cameroon coffee served to everyone at Le Premier Mall
- Location: Avenue de la Justice, Gombe, Kinshasa
- Opened: 19 July 2016; 10 years ago
- Owner: Hassan Yahfoufi
- Architect: AMT Congo Sarl
- Floor area: 10,000 sq ft (930 m^{2})

Le Premier is a shopping mall in Gombe, Kinshasa on Avenue de la Justice. Opened on 19 July 2016, it became Kinshasa's first shopping mall. It spans over 10,000 square meters, featuring a supermarket, numerous clothing boutiques, a food court, a bowling alley, banking services, a cinema, and leisure areas such as relaxation zones, care centers, and an international hotel school.

The mall was developed under the initiative of Hassan Yahfoufi, an American businessman residing in the Democratic Republic of the Congo. Its opening was celebrated as a milestone in Kinshasa's urban development, offering modern retail amenities and employment opportunities for local residents.

== History ==
The concept for Le Premier was launched as a private initiative to create an all-inclusive retail and entertainment center in Kinshasa. This vision was realized through a public-private collaboration spearheaded by AMT Congo Sarl, under the leadership of its president, Hassan Yahfoufi, an American entrepreneur based in DRC. Hassan Yahfoufi's family, who has lived in the DRC for over 40 years, spearheaded the venture to reduce the need for Congolese consumers to travel abroad for shopping. Initially slated for completion in early 2015, the mall officially opened on 19 July 2016.

=== Inauguration ===
The mall's opening ceremony was a significant event that drew many notable personalities, including David Brown, the chargé d'affaires at the U.S. Embassy, and Kinshasa Governor André Kimbuta. Governor Kimbuta praised the mall as a valuable asset for the city and renamed TSF Street, where the mall is situated, "Mall Street". As part of the proceedings, Yahfoufi was awarded the title of honorary citizen by the governor as recognition of his role in the city's growth. On its first day, Le Premier generated over 400 direct and indirect employment opportunities.
