= Lycée Descartes =

Lycée Descartes or Lycée français René-Descartes (LFRD) may refer to:

Schools in France:

- Lycée Descartes de Montigny le Bretonneux in Montigny le Bretonneux, Yvelines, Paris metropolitan area
- Lycée Descartes (Antony) in Antony, Hauts-de-Seine
- Lycée Descartes (Tours) in Tours, Indre-et-Loire
- Lycée Descartes (Champs-sur-Marne) in Champs-sur-Marne, Seine-et-Marne, Paris metropolitan area
- Lycée Descartes (Cournon d'Auvergne) in Cournon d'Auvergne

French international schools outside France:

- Lycée Descartes (Rabat) in Rabat, Morocco
- Lycée français René-Descartes de Kinshasa - Democratic Republic of the Congo
- Lycée français René-Descartes de Phnom Penh - Cambodia

Bilingual schools outside France:

- Lycée Cheikh Bouamama, formerly Lycée Descartes, in Algiers, Algeria
