= Immeuble du Gouvernement =

Building in Gombe, Kinshasa

Coordinates: 4.3137°S 15.2827°E

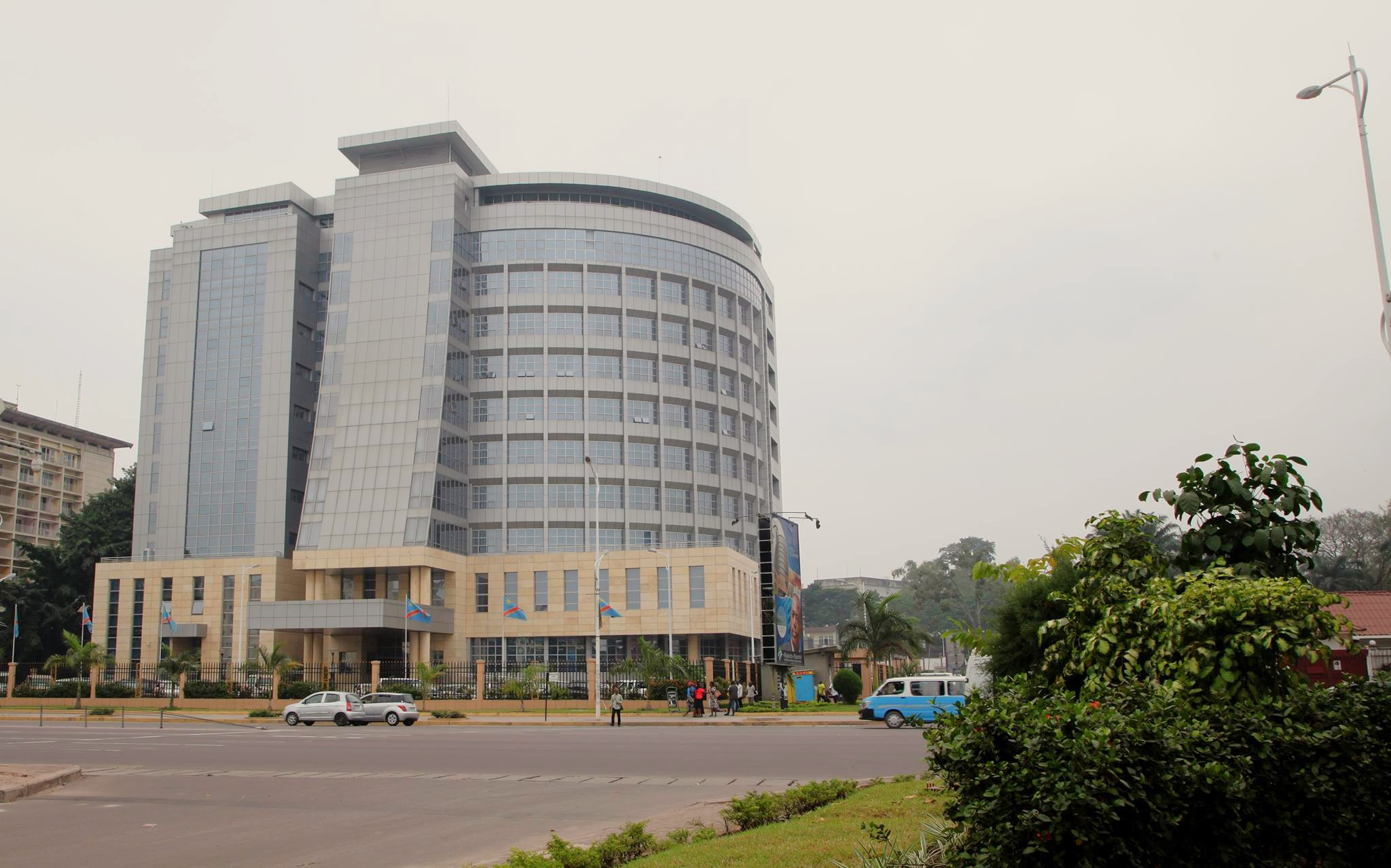
- Exterior view
- Alternative names: Hôtel du Gouvernement; Immeuble Intelligent

General information
- Architectural style: Modern
- Location: Boulevard du 30 Juin, Place Royale, Gombe, Kinshasa, Democratic Republic of the Congo
- Construction started: 1 August 2013; 13 years ago
- Inaugurated: 20 July 2015; 11 years ago

Technical details
- Floor area: 23,329.35 m^{2} (251,115.0 sq ft)
- Lifts/elevators: 6

Website
- https://imgouv.cd

Immeuble du Gouvernement (Government Building), colloquially known as Hôtel du Gouvernement, (Note: English: Government House) or Immeuble Intelligent, (Note: English: Smart Building) is a eleven-story building located in Gombe, Kinshasa, Democratic Republic of the Congo. It is situated along Boulevard du 30 Juin and houses some central government ministries and accommodates various public services.

The building was officially inaugurated by then-President Joseph Kabila on 20 July 2015, alongside the National Unity Monument at the building's frontage. Covering a total area of 23,300 square meters, it was constructed by the Chinese firm Société Zhengwei Technique Cooperation (SZTC) and employed approximately 500 Congolese and 200 Chinese workers.

== History ==
=== Construction ===
President Joseph Kabila launched construction of the government building on Boulevard du 30 Juin, opposite Place Royale in Gombe, Kinshasa, on 2 August 2013, to house ministers' offices and their administrative departments. Minister Fridolin Kasweshi Musoka said the eleven-level building would take 20 months to construct at an estimated cost of 24.2 billion Congolese francs, financed through funds generated by improved public financial management. Construction was carried out by Société Zhengwei Technique Cooperation (SZTC), with a workforce of 500 Congolese and 200 Chinese workers.

=== Opening ===
Initially estimated to cost 24.2 billion Congolese francs, the government building was inaugurated by President Kabila on 20 July 2015 at a final cost of US$41.7 million. During the ceremony, Kabila also unveiled the Monument of Unity (Monument de l'Unité) across Boulevard du 30 Juin at Place Royale.

The building covers 23,329.35 m^{2}. Its mezzanine houses conference and training rooms, while eight upper floors accommodate ministers' offices and their administrative departments. The basement houses technical services, and the ground floor contains protocol and security services, a bank and a restaurant. A terrace and helipad occupy the roof. Some observers acknowledged that the building provided permanent premises for government offices, most of which had occupied rented accommodation, but questioned the final cost and called for clarification of the budget allocation used.

In 2023, Prime Minister Jean-Michel Sama Lukonde Kyenge inaugurated an emergency medical unit with a reception area, a triage area, a doctor's office, two nurses' stations, a pharmacy, a laboratory, two observation rooms.

== See also ==
- Palais du Peuple
- Palais de la Nation
- Cité de l'Union Africaine
- Palais de Marbre
