= Lycée Français René Descartes Kinshasa =

School in Kinshasa, Democratic Republic of the Congo

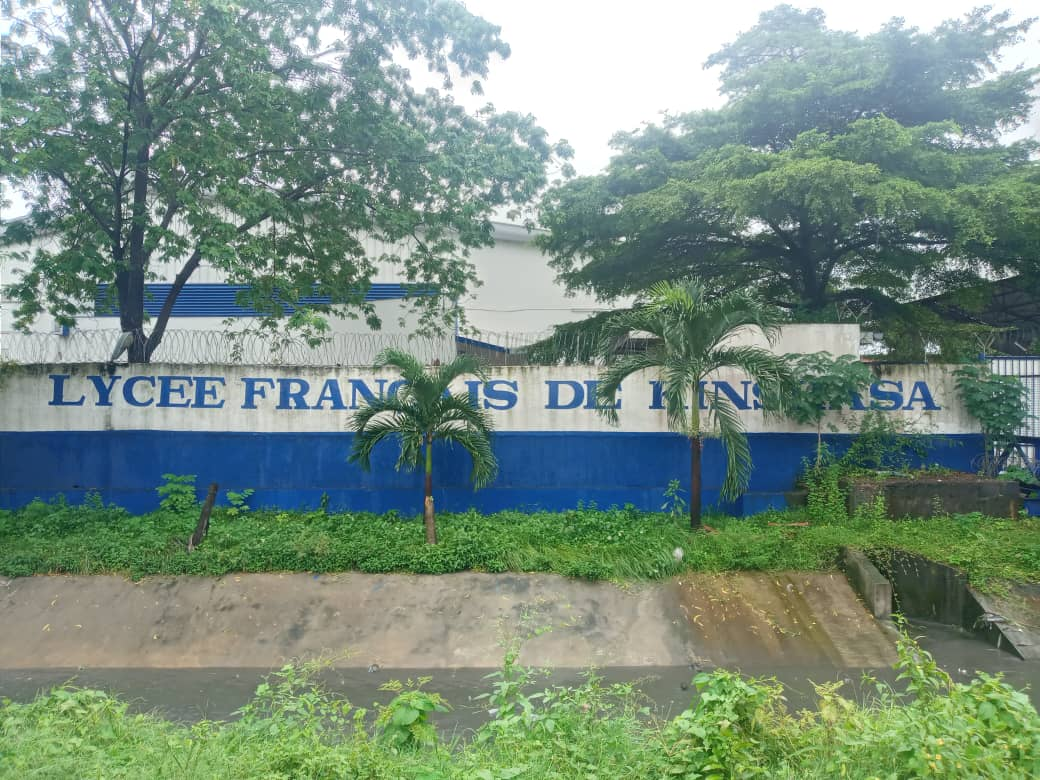

Location
- Site Gombe: Avenue de la Gombe, B.P. 8202, Kinshasa; Site Kalemie: Avenue Kalemie. En face de la résidence de l'Ambassadeur; DR Congo
- Coordinates: 4°18′12″S 15°17′43″E

Information
- Established: 1964
- Website: lfrdrdc.org

Lycée Français René Descartes Kinshasa is a French international school in Kinshasa, Democratic Republic of the Congo, established in 1964. It serves maternelle (preschool) through terminale, the final year of lycée (senior high school). In 2016–17 it had about 950 students.

There are two campuses in Gombe, Site Gombe and Site Kalemie; the latter is across from the residence of the Ambassador of France.
