= Collège des Hautes Études de Stratégie et de Défense =

College in the Democratic Republic of the Congo

College of Advanced Studies in Strategy and Defense
- Collège des Hautes Études de Stratégie et de Défense
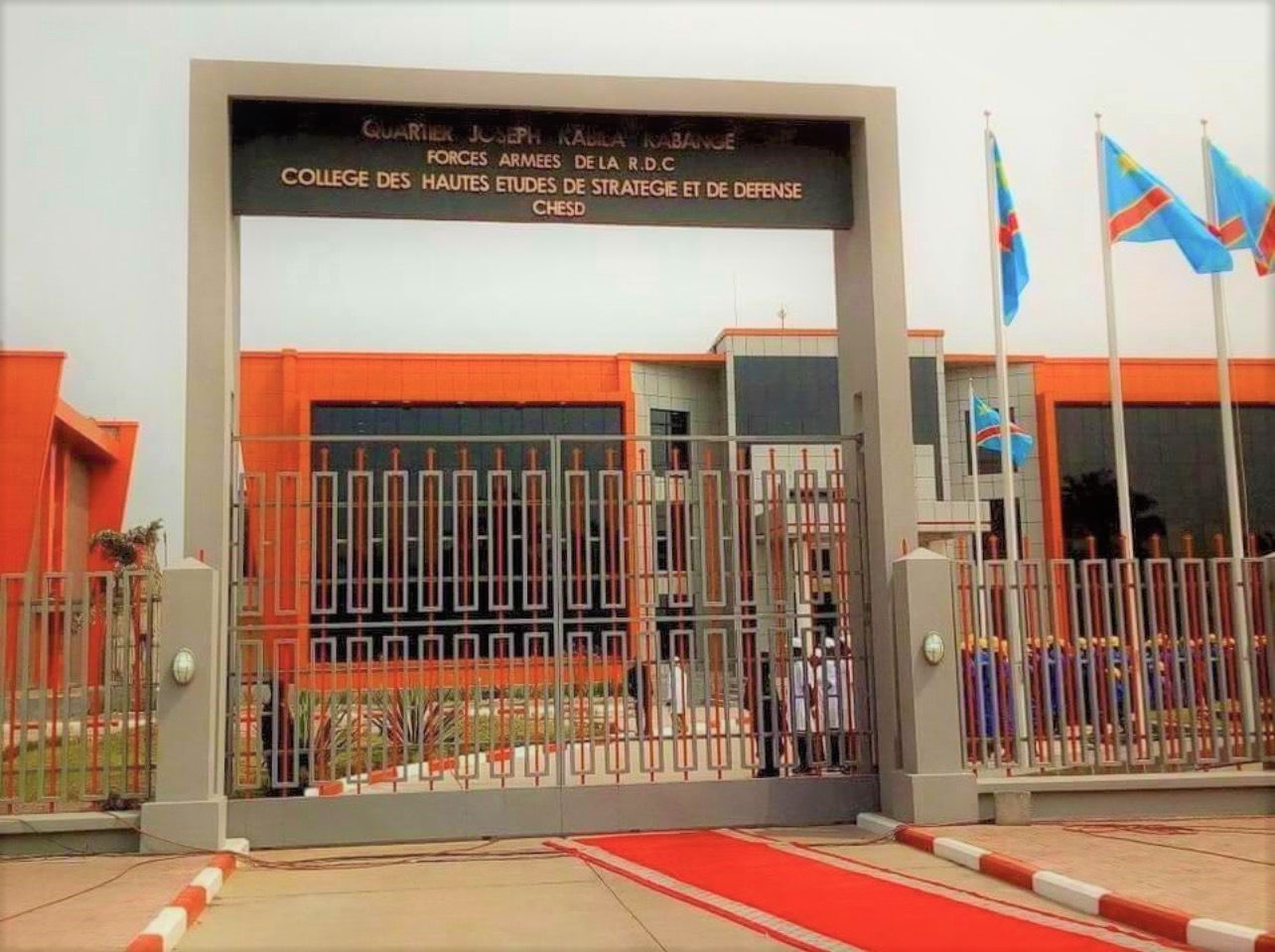
- CHESD's front view
- Type: Military institution
- Established: 28 July 2017; 8 years ago
- Affiliations: Ministry of Defense and Veterans Affairs
- Location: Gombe, Kinshasa, Democratic Republic of the Congo
- Campus: Urban
- Website: https://chesd-rdc.org/

The Collège des Hautes Études de Stratégie et de Défense, acronymed as CHESD, also known as the College of Advanced Studies in Strategy and Defense, is a strategic-level institution of higher education and training in the Democratic Republic of the Congo that provides advanced instruction in defense, security, and strategic studies to prepare senior military officers, police officials, and civilian leaders for high-level roles in national and international decision-making.

The institution is headquartered at the former Force Publique operational reserve base on Avenue du Haut Commandement in Gombe, Kinshasa, and functions under the authority of the President of the Republic and the Ministry of National Defense, Veterans Affairs, and Reintegration. It conducts its programs through ordinary and special sessions covering military strategy, geopolitics, peace and security, and defense governance, and also serves as a regional strategic center of excellence for the Economic Community of Central African States (ECCAS), hosting participants from multiple Central African countries.

== Organization and functioning ==
The CHESD is composed of seven main bodies:

Bodies	French	Responsibilities
Board of directors	Conseil d'administration	Provides strategic direction and supervises CHESD's overall operations. Chaired by the Minister of National Defense, Veterans Affairs, and Reintegration, and including the Chief of the General Staff of the Armed Forces of the Democratic Republic of the Congo and other senior officials, the Board determines institutional policy, validates training programs, and approves budgets and financial reports. It meets twice yearly in ordinary sessions and may hold extraordinary meetings when required.
Commandment	Commandement	Headed by a general officer appointed by order of the president of the republic, following deliberation by the Council of Ministers and consultation with the High Council of Defense. Assisted by a deputy, also a general or senior officer appointed under the same procedure, the Commander is supported by a private secretary, a legal adviser, a head of information systems and security, and a financial director. The Commandment ensures CHESD's operation, oversees and coordinates departmental work, implements the Board-approved training program developed in collaboration with ECCAS, establishes and applies administrative and accounting procedures, drafts and manages the CHESD's budget, and safeguards the performance and security of its information systems.
Administrative secretary general	Secrétaire général administratif	Manages administrative services, drafts official correspondence, prepares departmental files for submission to the Commander of the CHESD, handles the registration, transmission, and filing of mail, and ensures the acquisition of office supplies.
Department of Academic Affairs	Département des Affaires Académiques	Responsible for implementing CHESD's training program blocks and proposing adjustments when required, monitoring the academic performance of auditors, assessing their individual and collective work during training, and recommending distinctions and evaluations to be awarded at the conclusion of ordinary training sessions.
Department of Foresight in the Field of Equipment and Technologies	Département de la Prospective dans le Domaine de l'Equipement et des Technologies	Designed to anticipate future developments in security and defense. It evaluates technological developments that may influence defense policy and military capabilities, proposes relevant thematic content to the Department of Academic Affairs for integration into training programs, and assesses the operational effectiveness of equipment currently used by the FARDC.
Department of Doctrinal Studies and Strategic Research	Département d'Etudes Doctrinales et de Recherches Stratégiques	It serves as the CHESD's primary research and external engagement hub. It is responsible for developing, supervising, and monitoring research in the fields of strategy, military doctrine, and the employment of defense forces; evaluating developments that may influence defense policy and military capabilities; managing the library and multimedia center; organizing colloquia, conferences, and seminars; producing publications; and fostering partnerships with universities, research centers, and other institutions of higher learning.
Department of Administration and Stewardship	Département de l'Administration et de l'Intendance	Ensures the continuity of CHESD's daily administrative and technical operations. Its responsibilities include managing human resources and managing logistical and material support for training, including equipment, infrastructure, and services.

== History ==
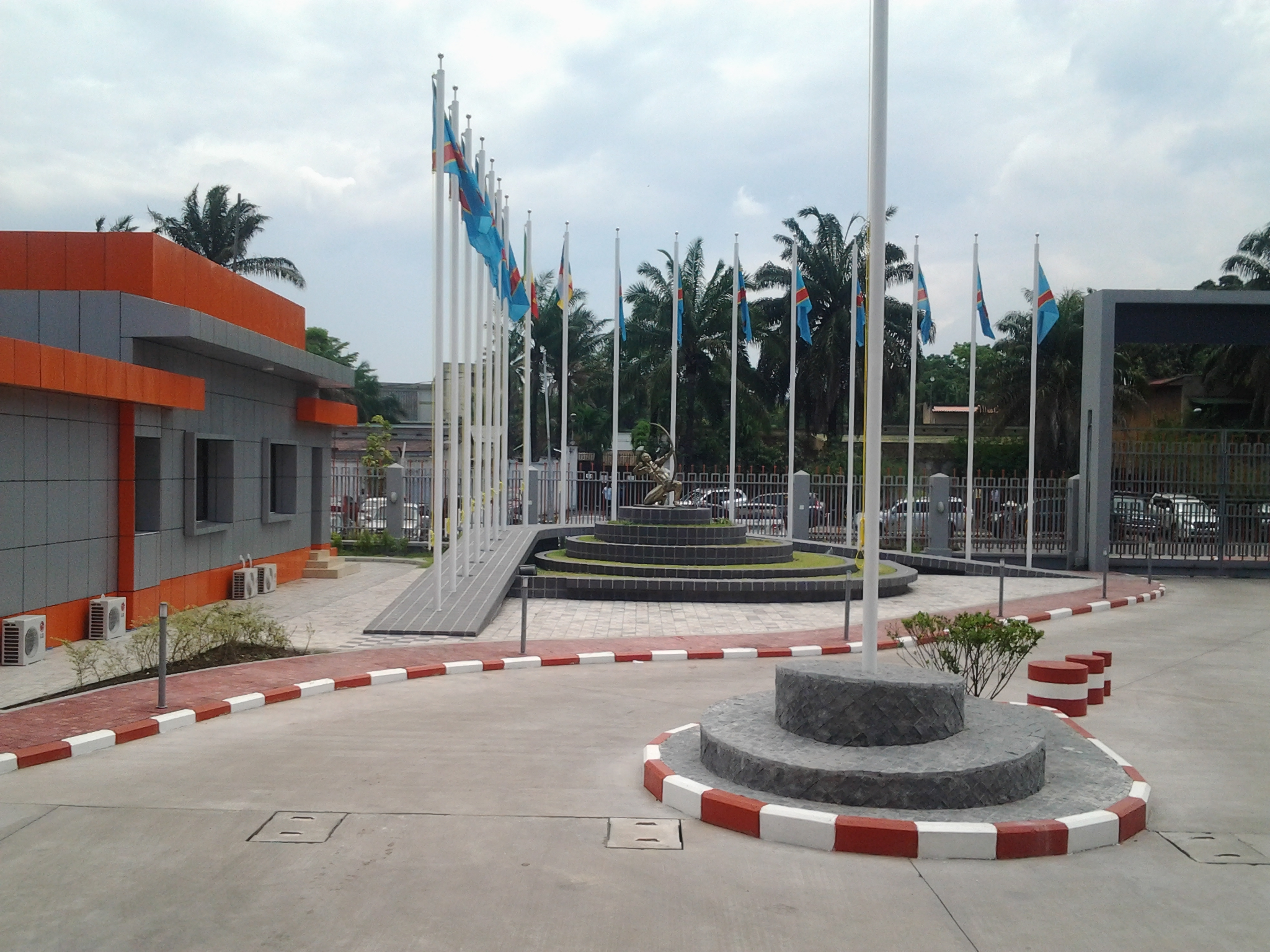
CHESD in 2017

Before the establishment of CHESD on the premises, the area was previously known as Force Publique Depot in the Congo Free State and Belgian Congo. The colonial army, the Force Publique, maintained a supply depot on the site along the road to Camp Leopold II (now known as Camp Kokolo).

On July 28, 2017, the fully reconstructed facility was inaugurated as the Collège des Hautes Études de Stratégie et de Défense (CHESD) by then-president Joseph Kabila.

In April 2019 the United States Embassy in Kinshasa announced the organization of civil-military operations training for senior officers of the FARDC at CHESD. The goal of the training is to improve relations between the civilian population and the military, strengthen good management practices, increase the professionalism of the FARDC, and create responsive and responsible military forces towards the citizens. The training will cover specific topics such as human rights, the prevention of smuggling of humans, drugs and weapons, and the prevention of the recruitment of child soldiers. The training will be delivered by an experienced retired team of senior US Army officers with considerable experience in civil-military operations. This training has been organized by the United States Department of State.
