= Timeline of Kinshasa =

The following is a timeline of the history of the city of Kinshasa, Democratic Republic of the Congo.

== 19th century ==
- 14th -18th Century Kongo Kingdom reigned victorious throughout the land
- 1881 - Léopoldville founded as a trading post by Henry Morton Stanley of the UK.
- 1885 - Town becomes part of Congo Free State.
- 1898 - Matadi–Kinshasa Railway built.

== 20th century ==
=== 1900s-1950s ===
- 1908 - Town becomes part of Belgian Congo.
- 1909 - Banque du Congo Belge headquartered in Léopoldville (approximate date).
- 1914 - Grand Hotel ABC built.
- 1917 - Collège Saint-Joseph founded.
- 1920 - Ligne Aérienne du Roi Albert (airline) begins operating.
- 1923 - Capital of Belgian Congo relocated to Leopoldville from Boma.
- 1928 - Elima newspaper begins publication.
- 1935 - Association Sportive Vita Club formed.
- 1936 - Daring Club Motema Pembe (football club) formed.
- 1937
  - Stade Reine Astrid (stadium) opens.
  - Radio Leo begins broadcasting.
  - Hotel Memling built.
- 1938 - Amicale Sportive Dragons football club formed.
- 1939 - Albert I of Belgium monument inaugurated on Place de la Gare.
- 1940 - Radio Congo Belge begins broadcasting.
- 1940s - Ngoma recording studio in business.
- 1943 - École Saint-Luc à Gombe Matadi founded.
- 1952 - Stade Roi Baudouin (stadium) inaugurated.
- 1953
  - N'djili Airport inaugurated.
  - African Jazz (musical group) formed.
- 1954 - Lovanium University established.
- 1955
  - Boulevard Albert I constructed.
  - Presbyterian Community in Kinshasa founded.
- 1956
  - OK Jazz musical group formed.
  - Colonial Governor-General residence built.
- 1957 - Académie des Beaux-Arts (school) active.
- 1958
  - Trico Center for nuclear studies established.
  - Plantations Lever au Congo (part of Unilever) headquartered in city.
- 1959
  - Anti-colonial riots led by the ABAKO political party.
  - L'independance newspaper begins publication.

=== 1960s-1990s ===
- 1960
  - City becomes capital of independent Republic of the Congo.
  - Joseph Kulumba becomes bourgmestre, succeeded by Daniel Kanza.
- 1961 - American School founded.
- 1962
  - National School of Law and Administration founded.
  - Revolutionary Government of Angola in Exile based in Léopoldville.
- 1963
  - Boulevard Albert I renamed "Boulevard du 30 Juin".
  - Zoao Boniface becomes bourgmestre.
- 1964
  - City becomes capital of Democratic Republic of the Congo.
  - Hotel Memling built.
  - Banque du Congo headquartered in city.
- 1965 - Centre d'etudes pour l'action sociale established.
- 1966 - Léopoldville renamed "Kinshasa."
- 1967
  - September: Organisation of African Unity summit held.
  - National Conservatory of Music and Dramatic Art established.
- 1969
  - Kinshasa International Fair begins.
  - Zaiko Langa Langa musical group formed.
- 1971
  - City becomes capital of Republic of Zaire.
  - Office National des Transports headquartered in city.
  - Inter Continental hotel in business.
- 1972 - École d'Informatique d'Électronique founded.
- 1974
  - September: Zaire 74 music festival held.
  - 30 October: The Rumble in the Jungle boxing match held.
  - Population: 2,008,352.
- 1975 -
- 1976 - Voix du Zaire broadcasting complex and BCZ building constructed.
- 1977 - Zekete-zekete musical style developed. Sozacom Building completed.
- 1979 - Palais du Peuple built.
- 1981 - University of Kinshasa established.
- 1982 - Le Potentiel newspaper begins publication.
- 1984 - Population: 2,664,309.
- 1985 - Meeting of the Association Internationale des Maires Francophones held in city.
- 1988 - Madiaba musical style developed.
- 1989
  - Athletic Club Sodigraf formed.
  - La Référence Plus newspaper begins publication.
- 1990 - Population: 3,564,000 (urban agglomeration).
- 1991
  - Fundu Kota becomes governor.
  - September: "Riots...by unpaid soldiers."
  - October: Anti-Mobutu demonstrations.
- 1992 - Kibabu Madiata Nzau becomes governor, succeeded by Bernardin Mungul Diaka.
- 1994
  - Orchestre Symphonique Kimbanguiste founded.
  - Kamanyola Stadium opens.
- 1996
  - Mujinga Swana becomes governor, succeeded by Nkoy Mafuta.
  - L'Avenir (Newspaper) begins publication.
  - 8 January: Airplane crash.
- 1997
  - Théophile Mbemba Fundu becomes governor.
  - April: General Gabriel Amela Lokima Bahati becomes governor.
  - May: City taken by anti-Mobutu forces led by Laurent-Désiré Kabila.
  - Central Bank of the Congo headquartered in city.
- 1998
  - August: Second Congo War begins; rebel forces move toward city.
  - September: Food shortage.
- 1999 - United Nations Organization Stabilization Mission in the Democratic Republic of the Congo headquartered in Kinshasa.
- 2000 - Population: 5,611,000 (urban agglomeration).

== 21st century ==
- 2001
  - Christophe Muzungu becomes governor, succeeded by Loka Ne Kongo.
  - January: President Laurent-Désiré Kabila assassinated.
- 2002
  - David Nku Imbié becomes governor.
  - Lola ya Bonobo animal sanctuary located near city.
- 2004
  - March: Coup attempt.
  - May: Jean Kimbunda becomes governor.
- 2005
  - Kimbembe Mazunga becomes governor.
  - Population: 7,106,000 (urban agglomeration).
- 2006
  - Post-election unrest.
  - Baudoin Liwanga becomes governor.
- 2007
  - March: Conflict between Bemba supporters and government forces.
  - 16 March: André Kimbuta becomes governor.
  - City website online (approximate date).
- 2010 - 2 June: Activist Floribert Chebeya killed.
- 2011 - 27 February: Coup attempt.
- 2012
  - October: Organisation internationale de la Francophonie summit held.
  - Population: 9,046,000.
- 2013 - 30 December: December 2013 Kinshasa attacks by supporters of religious leader Mukungubila.
- 2014
  - 11 May: Stade Tata Raphaël stampede.
  - Hôpital du Cinquantenaire (hospital) opens.
  - It's discovered that the origin of the HIV virus traces back to Léopoldville in the 1920s.
- 2015 - January: 2015 Congolese protests.
- 2023: The 2023 Jeux de la Francophonie.

== See also ==
- History of Kinshasa
- Urban history of Kinshasa (in French)
- List of governors of Kinshasa
- Communes of Kinshasa
- List of television stations in Kinshasa
- Timelines of other cities in DR Congo: Bukavu, Goma, Kisangani, Lubumbashi
- History of the Democratic Republic of the Congo
- Timeline and history of Brazzaville, Republic of the Congo (across Congo River from Kinshasa)

== Bibliography ==
=== in English ===
- Okwui Enwezor, ed. (2002). Under Siege: Four African Cities, Freetown, Johannesburg, Kinshasa, Lagos. Ostfildern, Germany: Hatje Cantz. ISBN 978-3-7757-9090-1. "Documenta11" + website
- Paul Tiyambe Zeleza; Dickson Eyoh, eds. (2003). "Kinshasa, Democratic Republic of Congo". Encyclopedia of Twentieth-Century African History. Routledge. ISBN 0-415-23479-4.
- Kwame Anthony Appiah and Henry Louis Gates, ed. (2005). "Kinshasa". Africana: The Encyclopedia of the African and African American Experience (2nd ed.). Oxford University Press. ISBN 978-0-19-517055-9.
- Kevin Shillington, ed. (2005). "Kinshasa". Encyclopedia of African History. Fitzroy Dearborn. ISBN 978-1-57958-245-6.
- Pascal Kapagama; Rachel Waterhouse (2009), Portrait of Kinshasa: A City on (the) Edge, London: Crisis States Research Centre – via International Relations and Security Network
- Filip De Boeck (2010), Spectral Kinshasa: building the city through an architecture of words, Uppsala: Nordic Africa Institute

=== in French ===
- "Léopoldville", L'État indépendant du Congo: documents sur le pays et ses habitants, Annales du Musée du Congo (in French), Brussels, 1904, hdl:2027/pst.000022332363 – via HathiTrust
- Marc Pain (1984). Kinshasa: la ville et la cité (in French). IRD Editions. ISBN 978-2-7099-0728-6.
- Léon de Saint Moulin [in Lingala] (2010). Villes et organisation de l'espace en République Démocratique du Congo (in French). L'Harmattan. ISBN 978-2-296-25787-0. (Includes information about Kinshasa)
- Futé, Petit (2012). "Histoire". Kinshasa. Le Petit Futé (in French). p. 30+. ISBN 978-2-7469-5927-9.

== Images ==
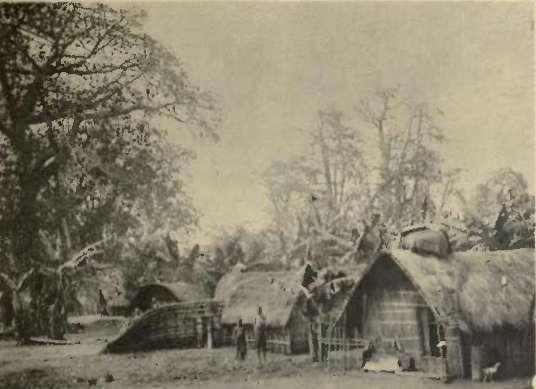
Kinshassa village, circa 1912

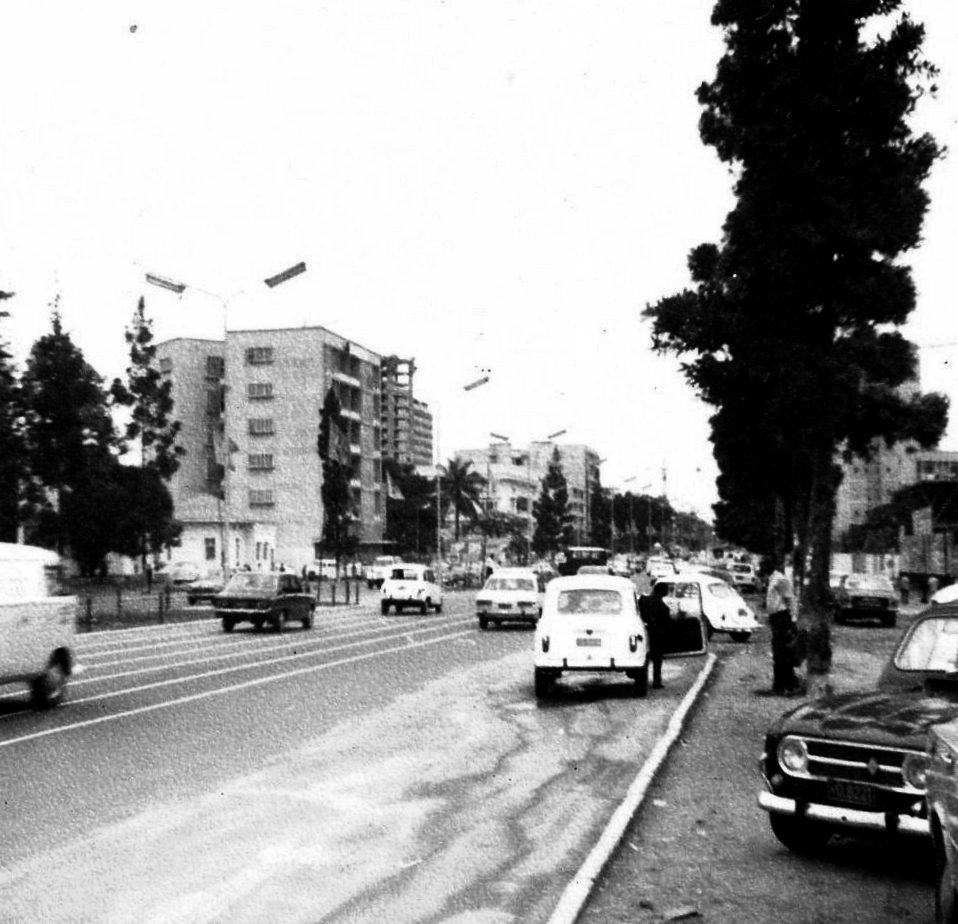
View of Kinshasa, 1972

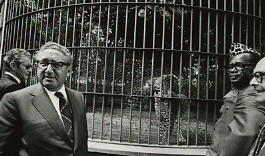
US official Kissinger visits zoo at president's palace, April 1976

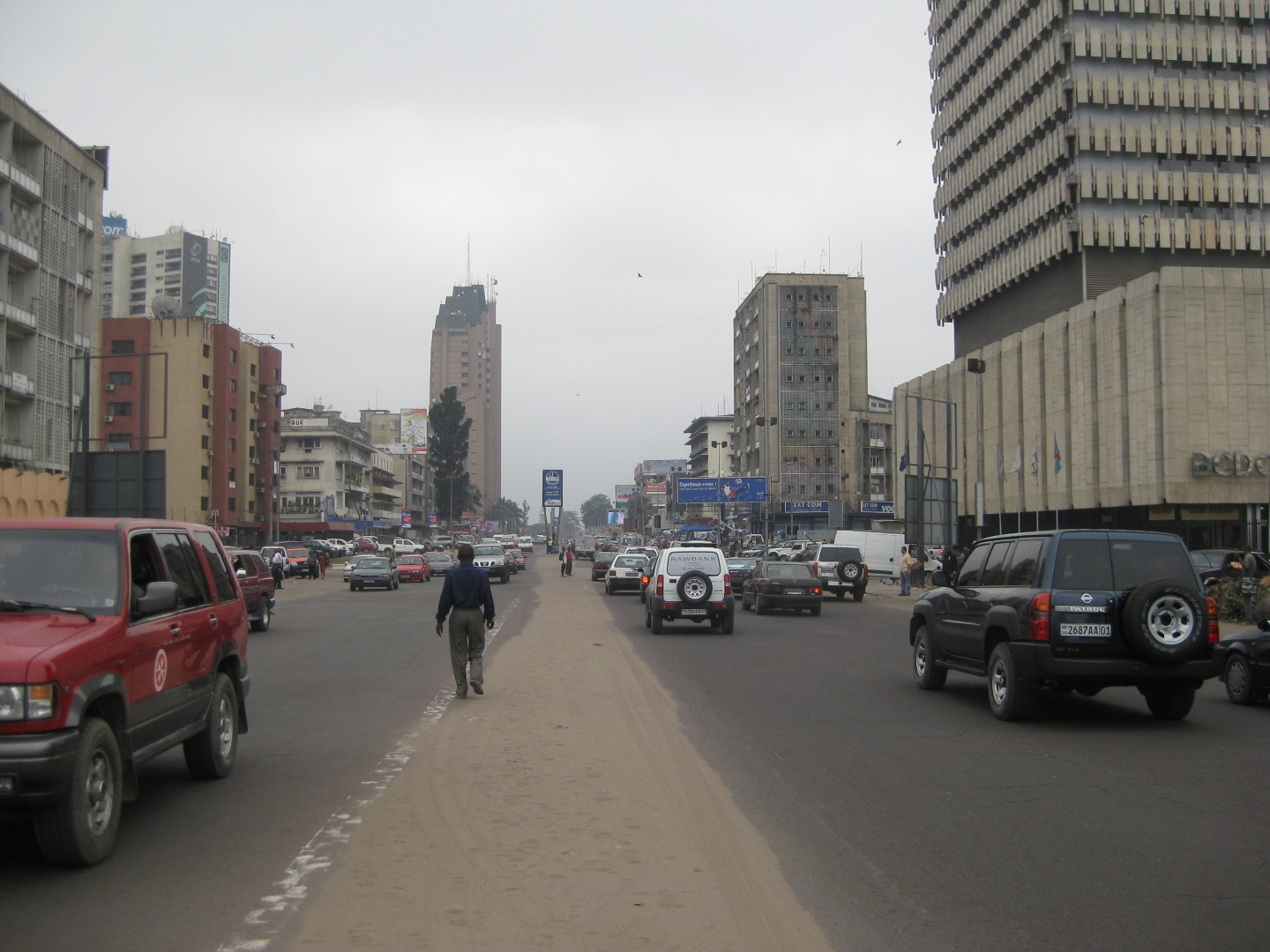
View of Kinshasa, 2009
