= List of governors of Kinshasa =

Kinshasa in the Democratic Republic of the Congo

The city of Kinshasa has had a different status under each of the different regimes in the Democratic Republic of the Congo. Kinshasa was alternatively a commune, a city, a region, and a city-province hybrid. Consequently, the political leaders of the city have borne different titles between 1960 and this day.

== Bourgmestre of Léopoldville ==
- Daniel Kanza (1960–1962)
- Zoao Boniface (1963–1965)

== Governor of Léopoldville (1966–1968) ==
- Colonel Bangala
- Paul Nauwelaerts

== Governor of the Kinshasa region (1969–1980) ==
- Jean Foster Manzikala
- Ndjoku E'Yobaba
- Sakombi Inongo
- Mandungu Mbula Nyati
- Mabolia Inengo Tra Buato

== Regional President of the MPR for the Kinshasa Region ==
- Kisombe Kiaku Mwisi (1980–1981)
- Sakombi Ekope (1981–1983)
- Kabaydi wa Kabaydi (1983–1985)
- Nzita Puati interim (1984–1985)
- Tshimbombo Mukunda (1985–1986)
- Catherine Nzuzi wa Mbombo (1986)
- Konde Vila Kikanda (1987–1989)
- General Gabriel Amela Lokima Bahati (1989–1990)
- Moleka Nzulama (1990)

== Governor of Kinshasa ==
- Fundu Kota (1991–1992)
- Kibabu Madiata Nzau (1992)
- Bernardin Mungul Diaka (1992—1996)
- Mujinga Swana (January—February 1996)
- Nkoy Mafuta (August 1996—May 1997)
- General Gabriel Amela Lokima Bahati (April—May 1997)
- Théophile Mbemba Fundu (1997—2001)
- Christophe Muzungu (May 2001—November 26, 2001)
- Loka Ne Kongo (November 26, 2001—June 5, 2002)
- David Nku Imbié (June 2002—May 16, 2004)
- Jean Kimbunda (May 16, 2004—November 15, 2005)
- Kimbembe Mazunga (November 15, 2005—October 16, 2006)
- Admiral Baudoin Liwanga (October 16, 2006 —March 16, 2007)
- André Kimbuta) (March 16, 2007–2019)
- Gentiny Ngobila Mbaka (May 7, 2019–2024)
- Daniel Bumba Lubaki (2024-)

== See also ==
- Kinshasa
- Kinshasa history and timeline
- Lists of provincial governors of the Democratic Republic of the Congo
