= Timeline of Lubumbashi =

The following is a timeline of the history of the city of Lubumbashi, Democratic Republic of the Congo.

== 20th century ==
=== 1900s-1950s ===
- 1909
  - 1 September: Elisabethville site designated seat of Katanga province; named after Elisabeth of Bavaria, Queen of Belgium.
  - 27 September: Sakania-Elisabethville railway begins operating.
- 1910
  - Union Minière du Haut Katanga (mining entity) active.
  - Hôpital Gécamines Sud (hospital) and Catholic Apostolic Prefecture of Katanga established.
  - Population: 360.
  - Émile Wangermée becomes vice governor-general of Katanga.
- 1910s - "Governor's Residence and Imara and Twendelee schools" built.
- 1911
  - Journal du Katanga newspaper begins publication.
  - Population: 1,000.
  - Etoile mining begins near Elisabethville.
  - Catholic schools Institut Marie-José and Collège Saint-François de Sales established.^{(fr)}
- 1912
  - Racially segregated "native city" established per ordinance.
  - Elisabethville becomes seat of Upper Luapula district.
- 1918 - Bukama-Elisabethville railway begins operating.
- 1919
  - Population: 8,000 (approximate).
  - Ruashi mining begins in vicinity of Elisabethville.
- 1920
  - "Management of the Union Minière was transferred from the British to the Belgians."
  - Catholic Sts. Peter and Paul Cathedral built.
- 1920s - "Makutano Club, Jerusalem United Methodist Church, and the Jewish synagogue" built.
- 1921 - Development of Albert I township begins.
- 1928
  - Port-Francqui-Elisabethville railway begins operating.
  - L'Essor du Congo newspaper begins publication.
- 1930s- "Courthouse and Mazembe stadium" built.
- 1931 - L'Écho du Katanga newspaper begins publication.
- 1932 - Wallace Memorial Church built.
- 1937 - Musée d'Élisabethville (museum) founded.
- 1939 - Football clubs FC Saint-Éloi Lupopo and FC Saint-Georges formed.
- 1941
  - Elisabethville attains city status.
  - Development of Kenya township begins.
- 1944 - Premiere of Joseph Kiwele's Cantate à la gloire de la Belgique.
- 1945 - Union Africaine des Arts et Lettres founded.
- 1946 - Académie d'Art Populaire d'Elisabethville founded.
- 1949 - Athénée royal built.
- 1950 - Development of Katuba township begins.
- 1950s - "Post office,...CSK headquarters, the theater, St. Mary's Basilica, and the railway headquarters" built.
- 1951 - Académie des Beaux-Arts d'Elisabethville founded.
- 1954
  - Development of Ruashi township begins.
  - City seal in use.
- 1956 - Université officielle du Congo et du Rwanda-Urundi opens.
- 1957
  - City "divided into 5 communes, one for Europeans and 4 for Africans."
  - December: Local election held.
- 1959
  - Roman Catholic Archdiocese of Elisabethville established.
  - Population: 183,711 (estimate).

=== 1960s-1990s ===
- 1960
  - June: City becomes part of independent Republic of the Congo.
  - July: City becomes capital of breakaway State of Katanga during the Congo Crisis.
  - Boniface Mwepu Katentakanya becomes bourgmestre (mayor).
- 1960s - "Gecamines tower and the 2 hospitals" built.
- 1961 - 15 September: Airport bombed by Katangese Air Force.
- 1963 - Mjumbe newspaper begins publication.
- 1964 - Stade Albert (stadium) opens.
- 1966 - City becomes capital of Katanga Province.
- 1967
  - La Générale des Carrières et des Mines (mining entity) headquartered in city.
  - Centre Culturel Français opens.
- 1970
  - Elisabethville renamed "Lubumbashi."
  - Musée national de Lubumbashi (museum) active.
- 1970s - "Hotel Karavia and Mobutu Stadium" built.
- 1971 - City becomes part of Shaba Province in the Republic of Zaire.
- 1972
  - Kampemba commune created.
  - University's Centre d'études des littératures romanes d'inspiration africaine active.
- 1974 - Société nationale des Chemins de fer du Congo (national railway) headquartered in Lubumbashi.
- 1975 - Population: 480,875 (estimate).
- 1977 - Annexe (commune) created.
- 1981 - University of Lubumbashi active.
- 1984 - Population: 543,268.
- 1990 - May: Student demonstration at University of Lubumbashi; crackdown.
- 1994 - Population: 851,381 (estimate).
- 1997
  - April: Alliance of Democratic Forces for the Liberation of Congo take city during the First Congo War.
  - Floribert Kaseba Makunko becomes mayor.
  - May: City becomes part of Democratic Republic of the Congo.

== 21st century ==
- 2007 - Moïse Katumbi becomes governor of Katanga Province.
- 2008 - Marie-Grégoire Tambila becomes mayor.
- 2010
  - Jean Oscar Sanguza Mutunda becomes mayor.
  - Congo Express airline (Kinshasa-Lubumbashi) begins operating.
  - Centennial of founding of city.
- 2011
  - February: Airport attacked by secessionist Tigers.
  - June: Unrest.
  - 7 September: Prison break; escapees include warlord Gédéon Kyungu.
  - Stade TP Mazembe (stadium) opens in Kamalondo.
- 2013 - March: Secessionist Mai-Mai Kata Katanga unrest.
- 2014 - January: Mai-Mai Kata Katanga unrest.
- 2015
  - City becomes capital of the newly formed Haut-Katanga Province.
  - Population: 2,015,502 (estimate).
- 2016 - December: Political protest.

== See also ==
- Lubumbashi#History
- List of mayors of Lubumbashi
- List of cities in the Democratic Republic of the Congo
- Timeline of Bukavu
- Timeline of Goma
- Timeline of Kinshasa
- Timeline of Kisangani

== Bibliography ==
=== in English ===
- Bruce Fetter (1974). "African associations in Elisabethville, 1910-1935". Études d'Histoire Africaine (6). ISSN 0071-1993.
- Bruce Fetter (1976). The Creation of Elisabethville, 1910-1940. Hoover Institution Press, Stanford University. ISBN 978-0-8179-6551-8.
- André Yav (1990). Johannes Fabian (ed.). History from Below: The Vocabulary of Elisabethville by André Yav: Text, Translations and Interpretive Essay. John Benjamins Publishing Company. ISBN 978-90-272-7825-8.
- Peter C Alegi (1999). "Katanga vs Johannesburg: a history of the first sub-Saharan African football championship, 1949–50". Kleio. 31: 55–74. doi:10.1080/00232089985310041.
- Paul Tiyambe Zeleza; Dickson Eyoh, eds. (2003). "Lubumbashi, Democratic Republic of Congo". Encyclopedia of Twentieth-Century African History. Routledge. ISBN 978-0415234795.
- Michel Lwamba Bilonda (2005). "Lubumbashi". In Kevin Shillington (ed.). Encyclopedia of African History. Fitzroy Dearborn. ISBN 978-1-57958-245-6.
- Johan Lagae (2016) [2010]. "From 'Patrimoine Partage' to 'Whose Heritage'?: critical reflections on colonial built heritage in the city of Lubumbashi, Democratic Republic of the Congo". In T. Fenster; H. Yacobi (eds.). Remembering, forgetting and city builders. Routledge. ISBN 978-1315605227.
- Sofie Boonen; et al. (2015). "A city constructed by 'des gens d'ailleurs': urban development and migration policies in colonial Lubumbashi, 1910-1930". Comparativ. 15 (4). ISSN 0940-3566.
- Sofie Boonen; Johan Lagae (2015). "Scenes from a changing colonial 'Far West': picturing the early urban landscape and colonial society of cosmopolitan Lubumbashi, 1910-1931". Stichproben: Wiener Zeitschrift für Kritische Afrikastudien (28). ISSN 1992-8629.
- Johan Lagae; et al. (2016). "M(g)r. De Hemptin(n)e, I Presume? Transforming Local Memory Through Toponymy in Colonial/Post-Colonial Lubumbashi, DR Congo". In L. Bigon (ed.). Place Names in Africa: Colonial Urban Legacies, Entangled Histories. Springer. ISBN 978-3-319-32485-2.

=== in French ===
- Noël van Malleghem (1950). "L'urbanisation d'Elisabethville". L'urbanisme au Congo Belge (in French). Brussels: Ministère des Colonies.
- A. Chapelier (1957), Elisabethville: essai de Géographie urbaine (in French), Brussels: Académie royale des sciences coloniales
- Jean-Claude Bruneau [in French]; M. Mbuyu (1983). "Passe, present et avenir possible de l'urbanisme a Lubumbashi". Zaïre-Afrique (in French). ISSN 0049-8513.
- Jean-Claude Bruneau; M.-T. Lootens-De-Muynck (1985). "Dynamique démographique des quartiers de Lubumbashi des origines à nos jours". Cahiers d'Outre-Mer (in French). 38 – via Persee.fr.
- Jean-Claude Bruneau; Marc Pain (1990). Atlas de Lubumbashi (in French). Paris. ISBN 978-2950490100.
- Lubumbashi, capitale minière du Katanga, 1910-2010 (in French). Éditions Lieux Dits. 2008. ISBN 9782914528535.
- Maëline Le Lay and Christian Kunda (2009). "Théâtre au Katanga: aperçu historique". Études Littéraires Africaines (in French) (27): 18. doi:10.7202/1034302ar. ISSN 0769-4563 – via Erudit.org.
- Bogumil Jewsiewicki; et al., eds. (2010). Lubumbashi, 1910-2010: mémoire d'une ville industrielle (in French and Swahili). Paris: Harmattan. ISBN 978-2296096608.
- Maurice Amuri Mpala-Lutebele (2013). Lubumbashi, cent ans d'histoire (in French). L'Harmattan. ISBN 9782343013992.

== Images ==
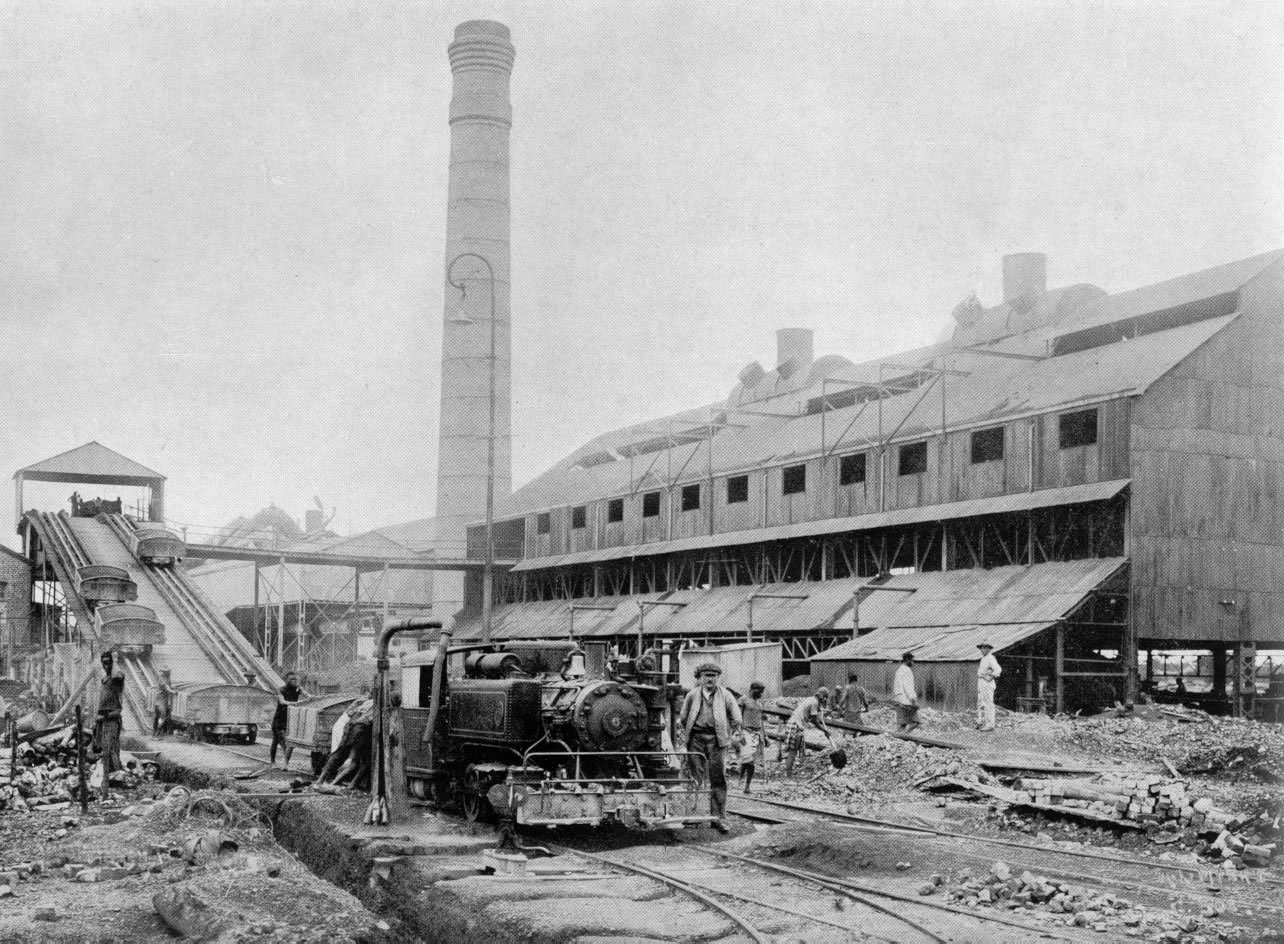
Union Minière du Haut Katanga mining facility at Elisabethville, 1917

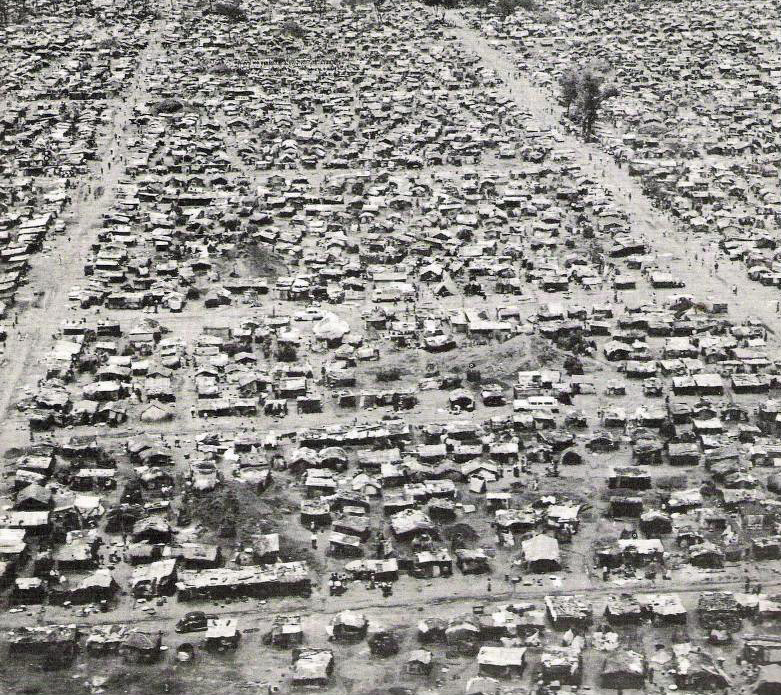
Baluba refugee camp near Elisabethville, 1962, during Congo Crisis

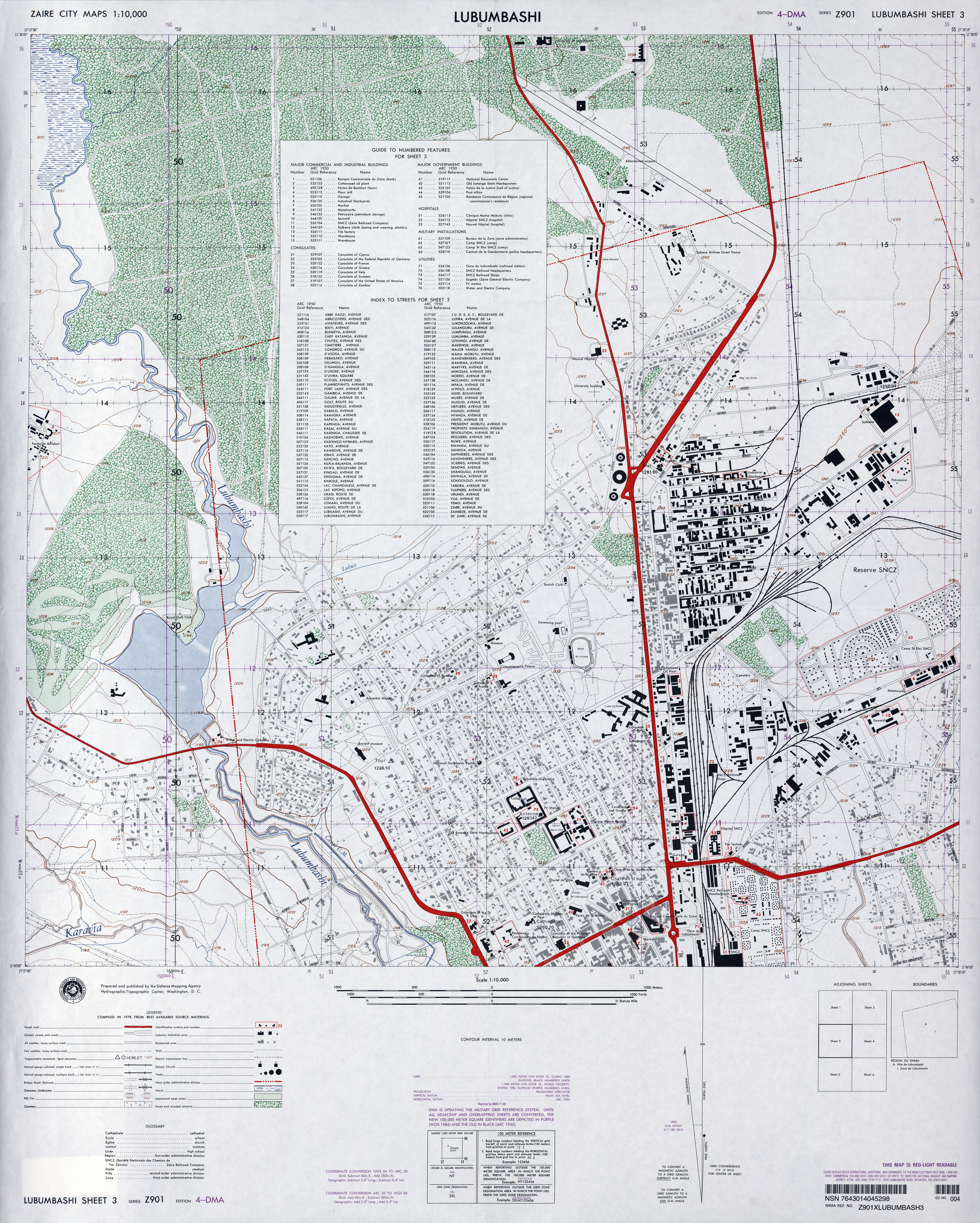
Map of central Lubumbashi, 1978

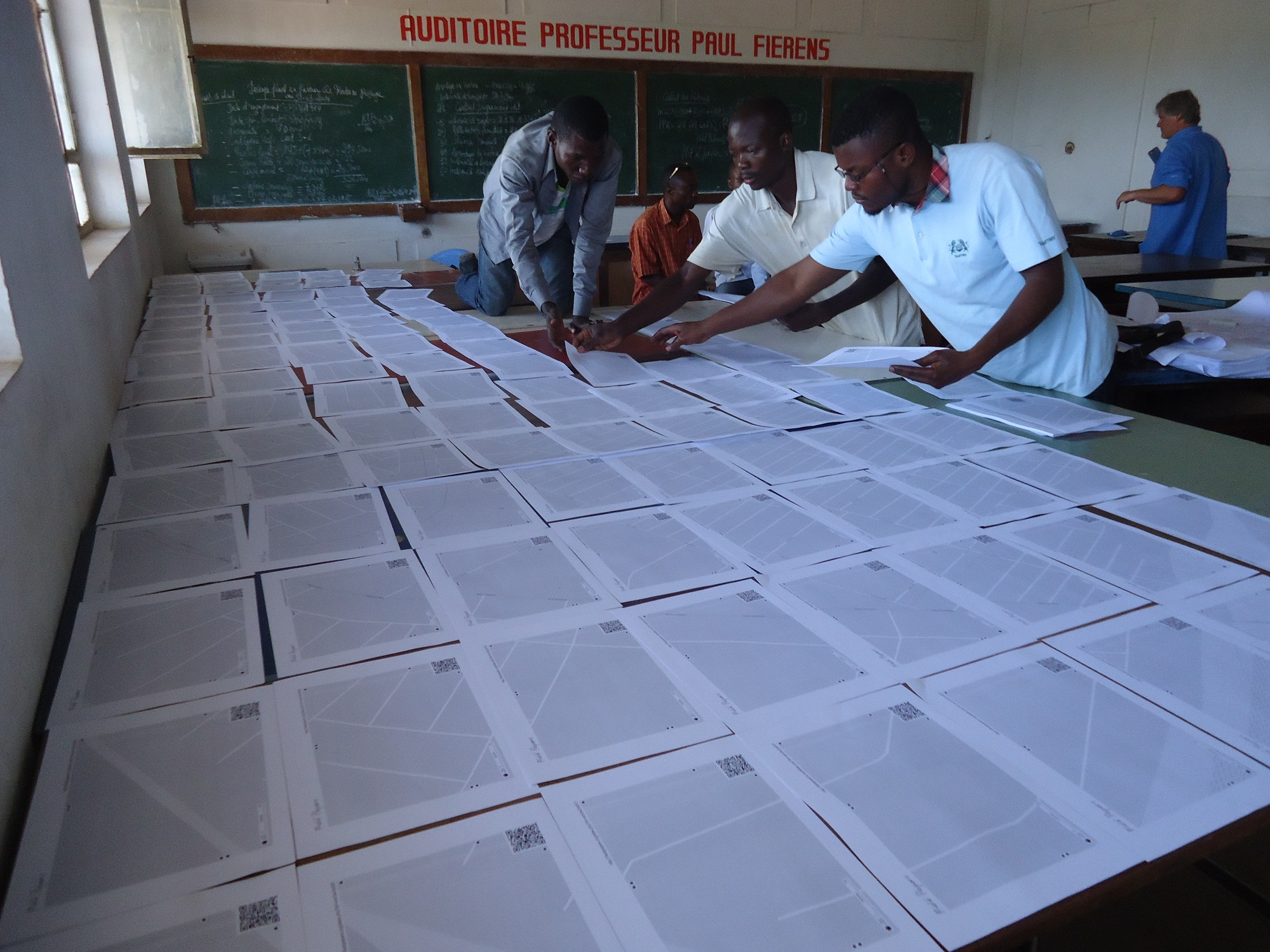
OpenStreetMap activity in Lubumbashi, 2014
