= History of Kinshasa =

Léopoldville was located on the Congo River in the Bas-Congo (modern Kongo Central) region, facing Brazzaville in the neighbouring French Congo, now the Republic of the Congo, on its far bank.

Kinshasa is the capital and largest city of the Democratic Republic of the Congo. It is situated on the Congo River near Pool Malebo and forms a single urban area with Brazzaville which is the capital of the neighbouring Republic of the Congo. Considered a megacity, it is among the largest urban communities in Africa.

The origins of the modern-day city date to 1881 when a trading post was established on the site by Henry Morton Stanley on behalf of the International Association of the Congo. He named it Léopoldville (French) or Leopoldstad (Dutch) in honour of King Leopold II who was his patron and subsequently King-Sovereign of the Congo Free State established in 1885. It expanded rapidly and supplanted a number of nearby villages, including one a short distance to the east known as Kinshasa, and its importance as an administrative centre grew. Following the Free State's annexation, it superseded Boma as the capital of the Belgian Congo in 1926 and became the seat of the colonial administration and Governor-General. A residentially segregated city, the street-plan and general layout of the city centre dates to the Belgian colonial period. The population expanded rapidly as a result of rural migration from across the colony, particularly in the aftermath of World War II. By the late 1950s it became central to the spread of African nationalism in the Belgian Congo. The popular music genre of Congolese rumba first emerged in Léopoldville and Brazzaville in this period and Lingala spread as a lingua franca along populations around the Congo River. By 1959, Léopoldville had a population of more than 300,000 and was one of the biggest urban centres in Sub-Saharan Africa.

On independence in 1960, Léopoldville became the capital city of the newly formed Republic of the Congo and continued to expand rapidly during the Congo Crisis and under the regime of Joseph-Désiré Mobutu. As an early example of Mobutu's programme of retour à l'authenticité for the removal of foreign and colonial influences, the city was renamed Kinshasa in 1966 after a pre-existing African residential area. His regime constructed skyscrapers and other modern buildings in the city as a showpiece of his new Zairean regime. However, corruption and lack of investment led to rapid deterioration of the city's urban infrastructure after 1980 as it continued to expand rapidly in size. As of 2017, it had a population of almost 13 million and is the 21st largest city in the world.

== Pre-colonial settlements ==
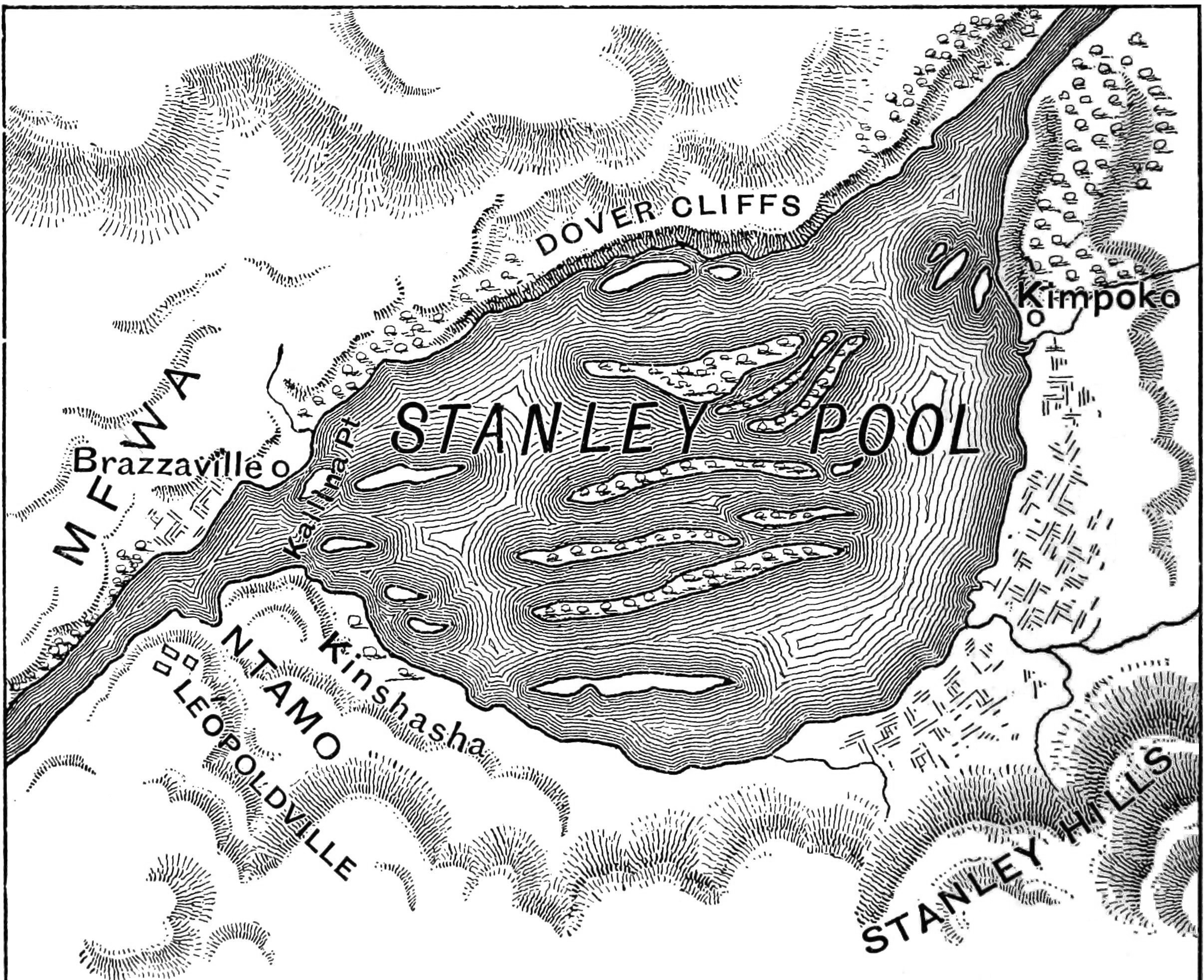
An 1895 sketch map showing the settlements around Stanley Pool (modern-day Pool Malebo) including the location of Léopoldville on the western bank of modern-day Ngaliema Bay as well as the village at Kinshasa. Brazzaville is also shown on the far bank of the Congo River.

From the 16th to 17th century, the Pool region became an important hub between the river and coastal areas. Vegetables of the Americas were also introduced to the interior of the continent through trade; slaves (most often the losers in various conflicts) were travelling to Loango, the mouth of the river and south of the Kongo Kingdom. The Bobangis, sometimes called Bangala (people of the river), occupied the major part of trade with the equatorial region in navigating the river and its river to the villages Téké Pool.

During the eighteenth and nineteenth centuries of mostly fishermen and traders from the north Teke install markets and villages in the southern Pool Malebo and on the board that will appoint the latest Batéké plateau. The tribes of the region, Humbu and Mfinu, were regarded as owners on this side of the river. Over time, the settlers Téké cause local farther shore, to the interior of the hills. The main Téké villages of the south shore were Nsasa with around 5,000 inhabitants, Ntambo with less than 3,000 inhabitants. Lemba, among a multitude of small villages, was the capital market and political Humbu, with about 300 residents. The markets saw River caravans slave holders of oil, almonds, palm, peanuts, sesame and ivory come and go.

== Colonial era ==
=== AIC and Congo Free State, 1881–1908 ===
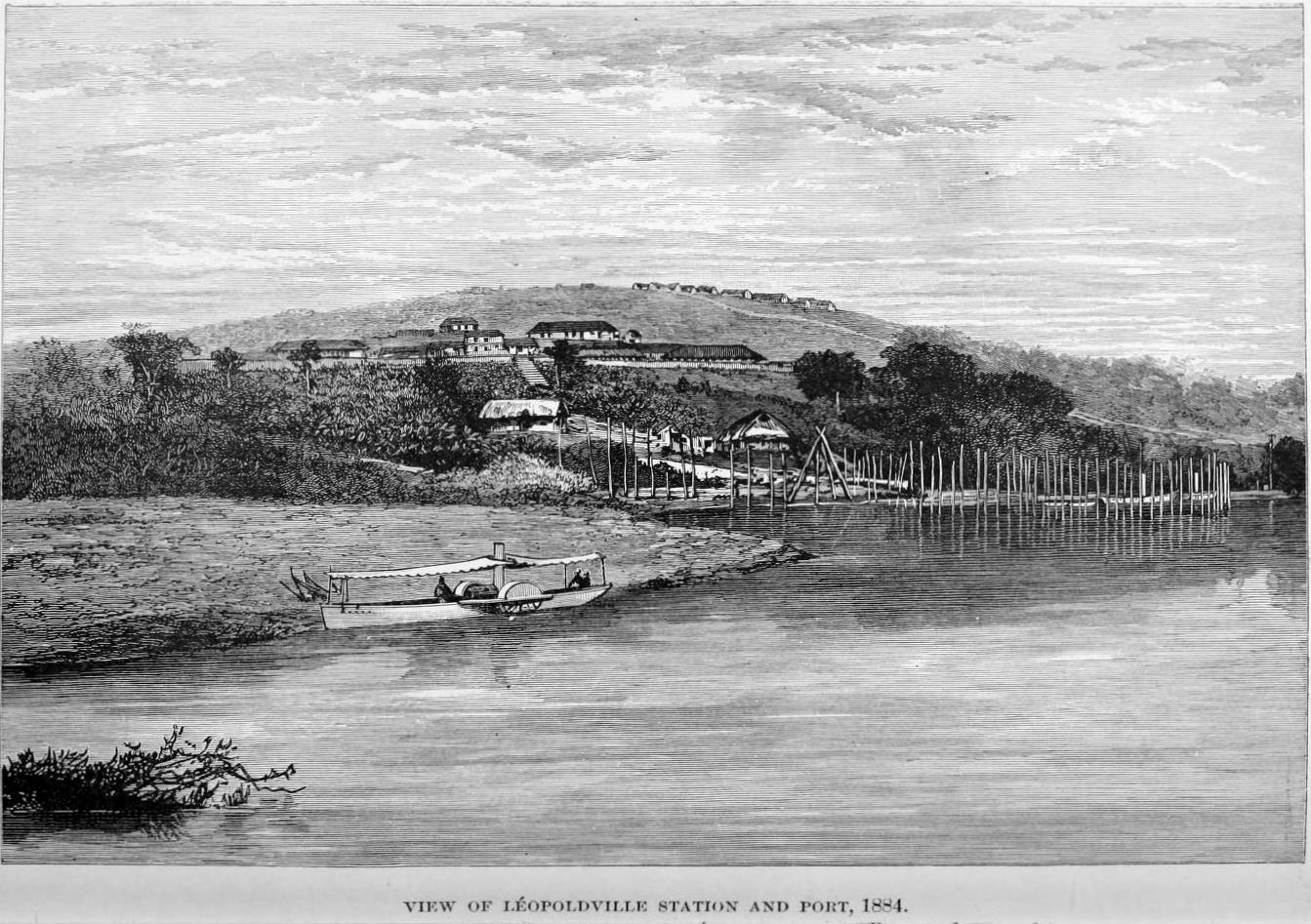
Léopoldville station and port seen from Ngaliema Bay, pictured in 1884

Henry Morton Stanley established a trading post on a hill close to the shore of Ngaliema Bay in 1881 some distance to the west of the modern-day city centre. Stanley named the settlement Léopoldville (French) or Leopoldstad (Dutch) in honour of King Leopold II who was the patron of the International Association of the Congo (Association internationale du Congo, AIC) and later King-Sovereign of the Congo Free State. Stanley delegated the settlement to his British subordinate Anthony Swinburne. At this point, it was not a major administrative centre as the colonial capital city was established at Vivi (1885–86) and later Boma (1886–1923).

The administrative post at Kinshasa initially consisted only of a wooden fortification and small village which Stanley described in The Congo and the Founding of Its Free State in April 1882 :

Léopoldville, with its one-story block-house, commanding from its windows all approaches, impregnable to musket-armed natives, and proof against fire, despite its grass roof, because, underneath that grass roof, there was an earth roof two feet thick, on which the fire might burn itself out harmlessly, offered a safe refuge should trouble arise. The terrace was long and wide — the native village was formed of one broad street — flanked by a row of clay huts on either side. Starting from a point thirty feet below the blockhouse, and sloping gently down to the landing place, gardens of young bananas and vegetables extended beyond these huts. Water was handy; fuel was abundant. The agricultural Wambunda were our landlords as well as our good friends.

The post flourished as the first navigable river port on the Congo River above Livingstone Falls, a series of rapids over 300 km below Leopoldville. At first, all goods arriving by sea or being sent by sea had to be carried by porters between Léopoldville and Matadi, the port below the rapids and 150 km from the coast. The completion of a portage railway running from Matadi to Léopoldville in 1898 provided a faster and more efficient alternative route around the rapids and sparked the rapid development of the settlement.

Local indigenous groups died off in large numbers and the city saw immigration from other parts of the Congo. Many immigrants came to join the Force Publique and encouraged the spread of Lingala as a common language in this multiethnic city. As time went on, textiles and brewing developed as local industries in addition to boatbuilding. However, Kinshasa did not profit greatly from the emergence of copper industry in Katanga Province after the First World War, the output from which was diverted first through British territories and then through Portuguese Angola.

=== Belgian Congo, 1908–1960 ===
"Brazzaville is just a village. Opposite, on the other side of the Congo [river], there is a city, a modern, lively city, a real city! It is called Kinshasa... but it is Belgian!"

— French writer Albert Londres, in Terre d'ébène (1929), p. 258

Léopoldville began to undergo major expansion around 1910 with the creation of a geometric city plan and the construction of new buildings including the Banque du Congo Belge and the Hotel A.B.C. (owned by the Compagnie Commerciale et Agricole d'Alimentation du Bas-Congo.) Schools were constructed and a Chamber of Commerce formed. The 1920s also saw the beginning of regular airplane service to Elisabethville (modern-day Lubumbashi) operated by the Belgian airline Sabena.

Population of Léopoldville under Belgian colonial rule
Year	Pop.	±%
1925	24,058	—
1930	32,594	+35.5%
1935^{a}	21,518	−34.0%
1940	34,976	+62.5%
1945	70,780	+102.4%
1950	126,844	+79.2%
1955	174,697	+37.7%
^{a} The decline was associated with the Great Depression. Source:

The African population was 20,000 in 1920 and 27,000 in 1924; the European population rose from 245 in 1908 to 2,521 in 1914 to 2,521 in 1918. In 1926, the city was elevated to capital of the Belgian Congo, replacing the far smaller town of Boma in the Congo estuary. By 1929 the city population was 48,088 including 2,766 Europeans and after a decline at the beginning of the 1930s began to rise again at the same rate. On the eve of independence in 1959 the city population was 300,000 including 25,000 Europeans.

Some researchers have identified Léopoldville as an origin point of the HIV/AIDS pandemic. A University of Oxford team in 2014 reported a high likelihood that the ancestor of HIV-1, Group M emerged Léopoldville between 1909 and 1930.

The original layout of the city was segregated between African and European, with a "no man's land" in between. As the city grew this in-between area became the commercial district. The city was formally redesigned in the 1930s with stricter rules for segregation and a bigger central area. A new central market for both races, as well as a golf club, a park, and a botanical garden for whites, were developed as part of the new cordon sanitaire dividing (not altogether effectively) the neighborhoods by race. Additional segregated master plans, proposed in Brussels and locally in the 1950s, were never implemented.

Among the African population, a distinctive urban culture began to emerge within Léopoldville during World War II. The city became known as the centre of Congolese rumba.

== Independence and Mobutu era ==
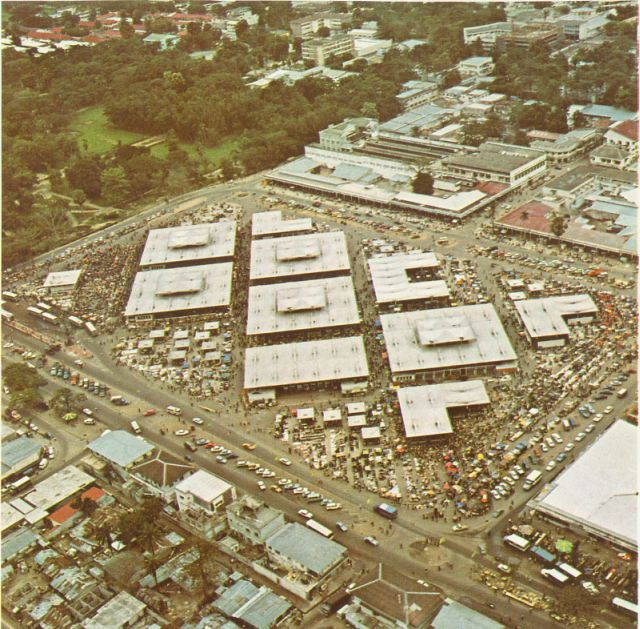
The Kinshasa Central Market was constructed in the modernist style in 1969–1971 on the site of the older public market in the cordon sanitaire.

When the Belgian Congo became independent of Belgium in 1960, Dutch was dropped as an official language and so was the alternative name Leopoldstad. The city grew rapidly (11.6% annually from 1960 to 1967; 6.43% annually from 1967 to 1973), drawing people from across the country who came in search of their fortunes or to escape ethnic strife elsewhere. This inevitably brought about a change to the city's ethnic and linguistic composition as well; Lingala remained the lingua franca. 367,550 people immigrated to Kinshasa in 1950–1967. Urbanized land area grew from 2,331 hectares in 1950 to 5,512 hectares in 1957 to 12,863 hectares in 1968 to 17,922 hectares in 1975.

In 1965 Mobutu Sese Seko seized power in the Congo in his second coup and initiated a policy of "Africanizing" the names of people and places in the country. In 1966, Léopoldville was renamed Kinshasa for a village named Kinchassa that once stood near the site. The city developed as the bureaucratic and cultural capital of the country, and developed an indigenous intellectual elite.

In 1974, Kinshasa hosted the 'Rumble in the Jungle' boxing match between Muhammad Ali and George Foreman, in which Ali defeated Foreman to regain the World Heavyweight title.

Kinshasa suffered greatly from the late 1970s through 1990s due to Mobutu's excesses, mass corruption, nepotism and the civil war that led to his downfall. Foreign businesses left, and roads, infrastructure, and transport links with other cities deteriorated. However, population continued to increase, due to endogenous growth and to migration from the countryside—driven by the cultural appeal of music, film, and football as well as by war and necessity.

== Kinshasa post-Mobutu ==
On May 20, 1997, after the First Congo War, Laurent-Désiré Kabila triumphantly marched with his rebel forces to take control of the country's capital after Mobutu fled into exile in Morocco. However, the city was later nearly taken over by other rebels backed by Uganda and Rwanda during the earlier part of the Second Congo War. It was very recently the scene of fighting between loyalists of Jean-Pierre Bemba and Joseph Kabila following the 2006 general elections; 600 people, including untold numbers of civilian bystanders were killed or wounded. Joseph Kabila, raised in Tanzania, and a poor speaker of French and Lingala, has not endeared himself to the locals.

The announcement in 2016 that a new election would be delayed two years led to large protests in September and in December which involved barricades in the streets and left dozens of people dead. Schools and businesses were closed down.

The population of Kinshasa has increased steadily, due to endogenous growth and to migration from the countryside. Migrants come to the city fleeing violence, attracted by the promise of jobs, and lured by its cultural image.

== See also ==
- Timeline of Kinshasa
- Timeline of Brazzaville
- Timeline of Lubumbashi
