= Floribert =

Floribert is a Belgian and Congolese masculine given name. Notable people with the name include:

- Floribert of Liège (died 746), Belgian saint
- Floribert Anzuluni (born 1983), Congolese politician and activist
- Floribert Chebeya (1963–2010), Congolese activist
- Floribert Kaseba Makunko (died 2014), Congolese ambassador
- Floribert Songasonga Mwitwa (1937–2020), Congolese archbishop
- Floribert Ndayisaba (born 1989), Burundian footballer
- Floribert Ndjabu, Congolese rebel
