= Mushobekwa =

Mushobekwa is a surname. Notable people with the surname include:

- Marie-Ange Mushobekwa, Congolese politician
- Prospère Mushobekwa, Congolese politician
