= Kaseba =

Kaseba is a Zambian surname. Notable people with this surname include:

- Christine Kaseba (born 1959), First Lady of Zimbabwe from 2011 to 2014
- Floribert Kaseba Makunko (died 2014), Congolese ambassador
- Tapson Kaseba (1992–2025), Zambian footballer
