= List of mayors of Bukavu =

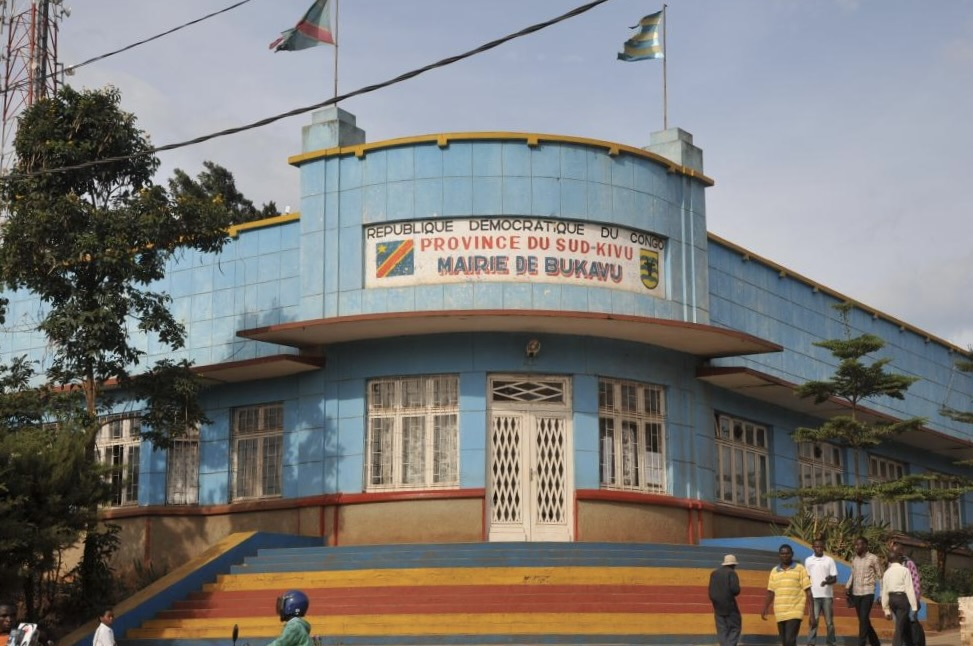
City Hall, Bukavu, 2013

This is an incomplete list of national mayors (bourgmestres) of Bukavu, in Sud-Kivu, DR Congo since the Independence, 1960.

== List ==
- Denis Maganga Igomokelo 1961-1964
- François Matabaro 1964-1967
- Daniel Birimwiragi 1967-1968
- Floribert Sukadi Bulayi 1968-1970
- Grégoire Sedei Sekimonyo 1970-1971
- Gilbert Kibibi wa Lukinda Umo 1971-1974
- Mosha Kayembe Dibwa 1974
- André Lokomba Kumuadeboni 1974-1979
- M'lemvo wa Maduda Yeka 1979-1981
- André Lokomba Kumuadeboni 1981-1982
- Me Nyaloka zizi Mata-Ebongo 1982-1984
- Ndala wa Ndala 1984-1986
- Shango Okitedinga Lumbahe 1986-1988
- Shemisi Betitwa 1988-1991
- Jules Walumona Kyembwa 1991-1996
- Migale mwene Malibu 1991-1996
- Thaddée Mutware Binyonyo 1996-2000
- Roger Safari
- Adolphe Cirimwami
- Mathieu Ruguye
- Prospère Mushobekwa
- Mme Nzita Kavungirwa Kayange, circa 2008
- Guillaume Bonga Laisi
- Philemon Lotombo Yogolelo, circa 2012-present

== See also ==
- Bukavu history and timeline
