= Timeline of Kisangani =

The following is a timeline of the history of the city of Kisangani, Democratic Republic of the Congo.

== Prior to 20th century ==
- 1875 - Town besieged by Arabs.
- 1883 - Europeans arrive.
- 1887 - Tippu Tip becomes governor of the Stanley Falls District in the colonial Congo Free State.
- 1899 - Cathédrale Notre-Dame du Rosaire built.

== 20th century ==
- 1904 - Catholic Apostolic Prefecture of Stanley Falls established.
- 1906 - Ponthiérville-Stanleyville railway begins operating.
- 1908 - Town becomes part of the colonial Belgian Congo.
- 1913 - Justin Malfeyt becomes governor of Orientale Province.
- 1921 - Ligne Aérienne du Roi Albert (Leopoldville-Stanleville) airline begins operating.
- 1930 - October: Tornado occurs.
- 1935 - Town becomes seat of the newly formed Stanleyville province.
- 1947 - Town becomes seat of the Orientale Province.
- 1955 - AS Nika (football club) formed.
- 1957 - Bralima Brewery plant begins operating.
- 1959 - Population: 126,533 (estimate).
- 1960
  - 30 June: City becomes part of newly independent Republic of the Congo.
  - July: Unrest.
- 1964
  - City taken by rebels during the Simba rebellion.
  - November: 1964 Stanleyville massacre occurs.
  - Stanleyville becomes capital of the newly created People's Republic of the Congo.
- 1966
  - July: Mercenaries' Mutiny attempted.
  - Stanleyville renamed "Kisangani."
- 1967 - Second Mercenaries' Mutiny occurs.
- 1970
  - Belgian king Baudouin visits city.
  - Population: 216,526.
- 1971
  - Société Textile de Kisangani (manufactory) begins operating.
  - City becomes seat of Haut-Zaïre province.
- 1975 - Population: 297,888 (estimate).
- 1980 - May: Catholic pope visits Kisangani.
- 1981 - University of Kisangani established.
- 1984 - Population: 317,581.
- 1986 - "Diamond deposits...first discovered."
- 1991 - September: City "pillaged...by rampaging soldiers."
- 1992 - November: Riverboat shutdown begins.
- 1993 - December: City again looted by soldiers.
- 1994 - Population: 417,517.
- 1996 - November: City besieged by "Zairian soldiers fleeing the war zone" during the First Congo War.
- 1997
  - March: City taken by rebel forces.
  - City becomes seat of Haut-Congo province.
- 2000 - June: Rwanda-Uganda armed conflict occurs in Kisangani.

== 21st century ==
- 2002 - 14–15 May: Massacre.
- 2003 - August: Arrival via Congo river of "first commercial delivery from the capital since the fighting began in 1998."
- 2007 - Médard Autsai Asenga becomes provincial governor.
- 2008 - Guy Shilton Baendo Tofuli becomes mayor.
- 2010 - National military Camp Base in operation (approximate date).
- 2011 - 8 July: Airplane crash occurs at Bangoka International Airport.
- 2013 - Jean Bamanisa Saïdi becomes provincial governor.
- 2015 - City becomes seat of Tshopo province (officially created in 2006).
- 2016 - Jean Ilongo Tokole becomes governor of Tshopo province.
- 2017 - Constant Lomata becomes governor of Tshopo province.

== See also ==
- Kisangani history
- Timelines of other cities in DR Congo: Bukavu, Goma, Kinshasa, Lubumbashi

== Bibliography ==
in English

- Valdo Pons (1969). Stanleyville: An African Urban Community under Belgian Administration. Oxford University Press, for International African Institute. ISBN 9780197241769.
- V. S. Naipaul (1979). A Bend in the River. Knopf. ISBN 0-394-50573-5. (Novel set in fictional town similar to Kisangani)
- Janet MacGaffey (1987). Entrepreneurs and Parasites: The Struggle for Indigenous Capitalism in Zaïre. Cambridge University Press. ISBN 978-0-521-33533-1. (Case study of Kisangani)
- Howard W. French (14 February 1997), "Kisangani Journal: An Outpost Whose Futures Have Come and Gone", New York Times
- Jean Tshonda Omasombo (2002). "Kisangani and the curve of destiny". In Okwui Enwezor (ed.). Under Siege: Four African Cities, Freetown, Johannesburg, Kinshasa, Lagos. Ostfildern, Germany: Hatje Cantz. ISBN 978-3-7757-9090-1. "Documenta11"
- Jean Omasombo (2005). "Kisangani: A City at its Lowest Ebb". In Abdoumaliq Simone; Abdelghani Abouhani (eds.). Urban Africa: Changing Contours of Survival in the City. London: Zed Books. ISBN 1842775936.

in French

- "Stanleyville", L'État indépendant du Congo: documents sur le pays et ses habitants, Annales du Musée du Congo (in French), Brussels, 1904, hdl:2027/pst.000022332363 – via HathiTrust
- Élisabethville-Stanleyville par la route (Touring-Club du Congo belge, Léopoldville, 31 mars 1941, pp. 25–26; 30 avril 1941, pp. 46–47).
- Singhitini F. M. de Thier(?) (1963), La Stanleyville musulmane [Muslim Stanleyville], Correspondance d'Orient (in French), Brussels: Centre pour l'Etude du Problème du Monde musulman contemporain
- Benoît Verhaegen, ed. (1975). Kisangani 1876-1976. Histoire d'une ville (in French). Kinshasa: Presses Universitaires du Zaïre. OCLC 869660596.
- Bogumil Jewsiecki (1978). "Histoire économique d'une ville coloniale Kisangani: 1877-1960". Les cahiers du CEDAF (in French) (5). Brussels: Centre d'Etudes et de Documentation Africaines. ISSN 0250-1619.
- Léon de Saint Moulin (2010). "Kisangani". Villes et organisation de l'espace en République Démocratique du Congo (in French). L'Harmattan. ISBN 978-2-296-25787-0.
- Bérengère Piret (2014), Les cent mille briques. La prison et les détenus de Stanleyville [Hundred thousand bricks: the prison and inmates of Stanleyville] (in French), Lille: Centre d'histoire judiciaire, ISBN 978-2-910114-26-8

== Images ==
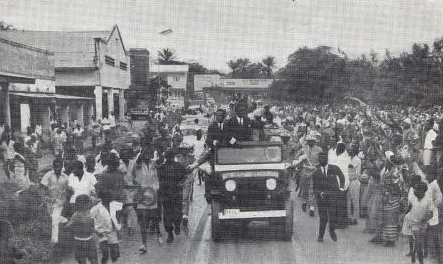
Politician Moïse Tshombe visits Stanleyville, 1964

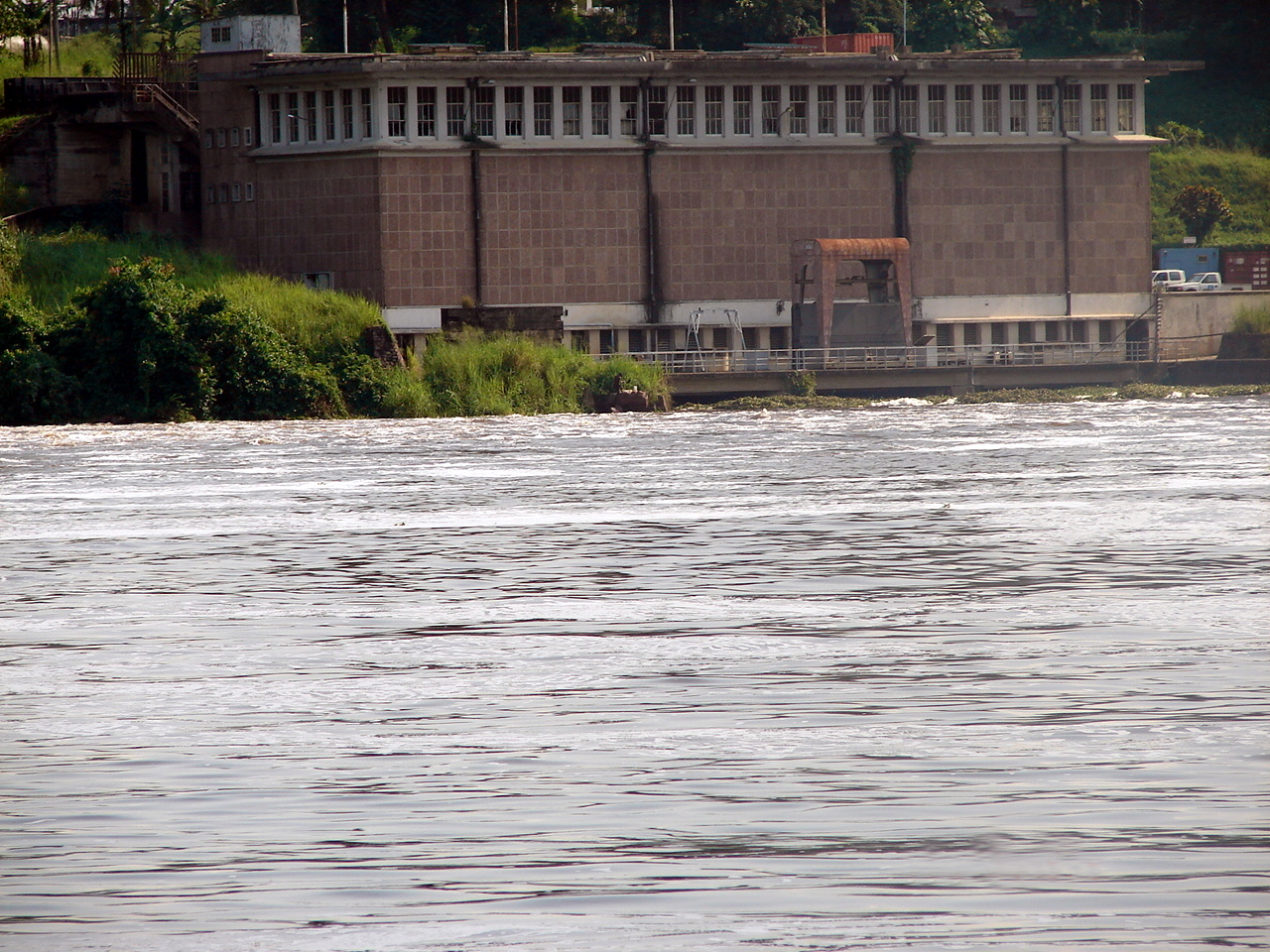
Hydroelectric dam on Tshopo river, built in 1954-1955 (photo 2006)

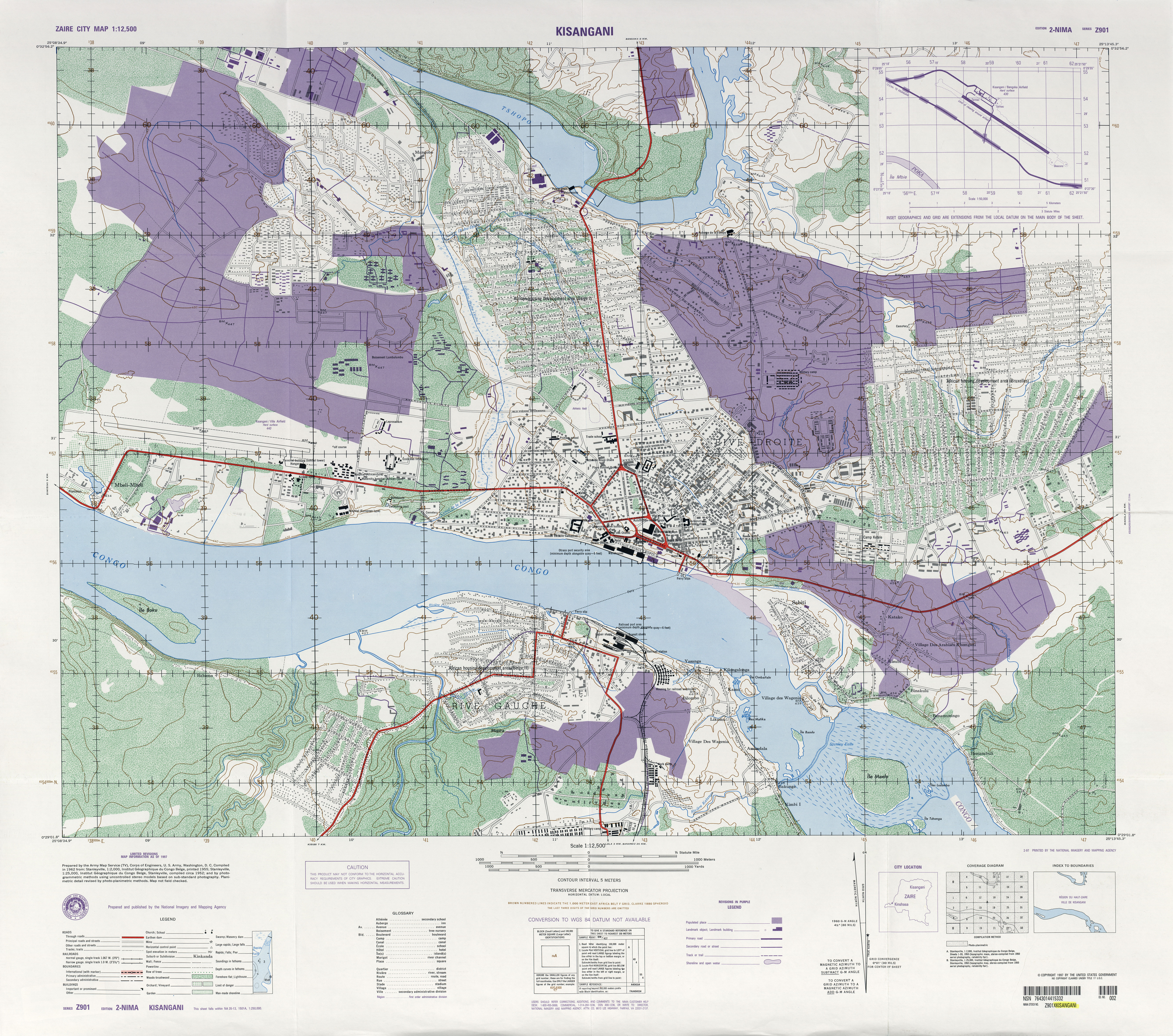
Map of Kisangani, 1997

Military training at Camp Base, Kisangani, 2010
