= Prospère Mushobekwa =

Prospère Mushobekwa Nyalukemba is the former president of the Provincial Assembly of Sud-Kivu (until 2004), and a former mayor of Bukavu.

== See also ==
- Bukavu history and timeline
- List of mayors of Bukavu
