= Timeline of Bukavu =

The following is a timeline of the history of the city of Bukavu, Democratic Republic of the Congo.

== 20th century ==
- 1924 - Bukavu becomes part of the newly formed administrative Province Orientale in colonial Belgian Congo.^{(fr)}
- 1925 - Seat of Kivu District relocated to Bukavu from Rutshuru.
- 1927 - Bukavu renamed "Costermansville" after Belgian colonial official Paul Costermans.
- 1929 - Catholic Apostolic Vicariate of Kivu established.
- 1927 - Zoological and Forest Reserve of Mount Kahuzi established near Costermansville.
- 1938 - Collège Notre Dame de la Victoire founded by Catholic Pères Blancs.
- 1942 - Catholic, Swahili-French language Hodi newspaper begins publication.
- 1951
  - Catholic Our Lady of Peace Cathedral built.
  - Bushi Football Club founded.
- 1953
  - Costermansville renamed "Bukavu."
  - La Presse Africaine newspaper begins publication.
- 1958 - Bukavu attains city status.
- 1961
  - Denis Maganga Igomokelo becomes mayor.
  - École de régence (school) established.
- 1967 - 9 August: City taken by rebel Katangan forces.
- 1970 - Kahuzi-Biéga National Park established near city.
- 1975 - Population: 146,504 (estimate).
- 1984 - Population: 167,950 (estimate).
- 1989 - City becomes part of the newly formed South Kivu province.
- 1993 - Radio Maendeleo begins broadcasting.
- 1994
  - Rwandan war refugees flee to Bukavu.
  - Population: 201,569 (estimate).
- 1996 - October: City taken by Alliance of Democratic Forces for the Liberation of Congo.
- 1999 - Panzi Hospital established.
- 2000 - Congolese war refugees arrive in Bagira.

== 21st century ==
- 2004 - May–June: Violent conflict between rebel and national forces.
- 2007 - 13 June: Journalist Serge Maheshe killed.
- 2008
  - 3 February: 2008 Lake Kivu earthquake.
  - 22 November: Mass graves found on land owned by Rally for Congolese Democracy party member.
  - Zita Kavungirwa Kayange becomes mayor.
  - OC Bukavu Dawa wins Coupe du Congo football contest.
- 2010
  - 17 October: Women demonstrate "to demand an end to a wave of mass rapes."
  - Marcellin Cishambo becomes governor of South Kivu province.
- 2012 - 12 February: Airplane carrying politicians crashes in Bukavu; Augustin Katumba Mwanke killed.
- 2014
  - February: Political rally; crackdown.
  - 5 June: Prison break occurs.
- 2015
  - January: 2015 Congolese protests.
  - August: 2015 South Kivu earthquake.
  - Population: 295,665 (estimate).
  - Saveur du Kivu coffee event begins.
  - Lusenda refugee camp begins operating in vicinity of Bukavu.
- 2017
  - 28 July: Prison break occurs.
  - August: Cholera outbreak.
- 2022
  - 2022 Bukavu floods.
- 2025
  - February: 2025 Bukavu offensive.

== See also ==
- Bukavu history
- List of mayors of Bukavu
- Timelines of other cities in DR Congo: Goma, Kinshasa, Kisangani, Lubumbashi

== Bibliography ==
- Samir Chamaa; Ahobangeze Ndagiriyehe (1981). "Evolution et structure de la population de Bukavu". Cahiers d'Outre-Mer (in French). 34 – via Persee.fr.
- John Le Carré (20 September 2007), "Une réalité si stupéfiante...", Le Monde (in French), Paris
- Léon de Saint Moulin [in Lingala] (2010). "Bukavu". Villes et organisation de l'espace en République Démocratique du Congo (in French). L'Harmattan. ISBN 978-2-296-25787-0.

== Images ==
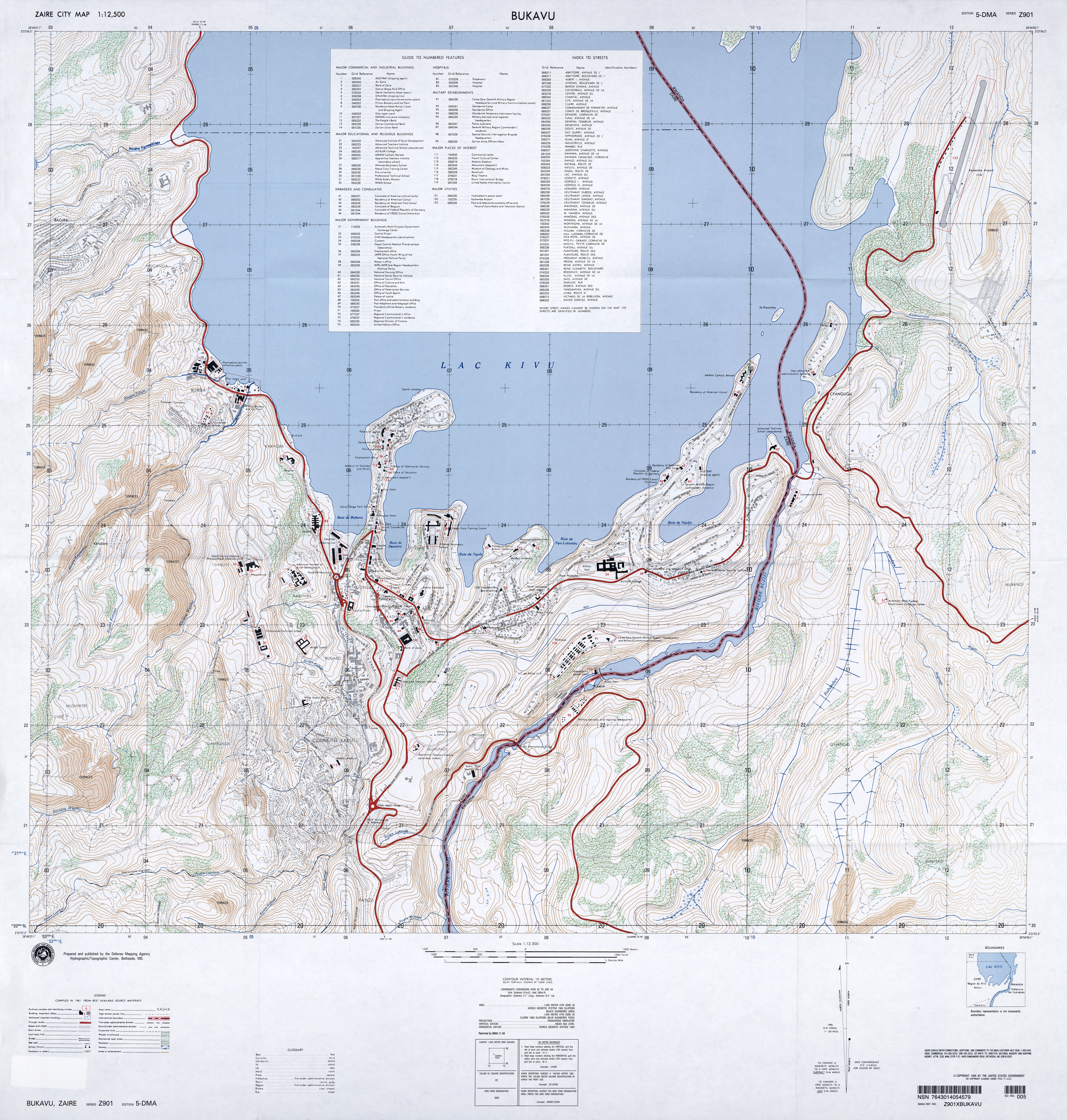
Map of Bukavu area, 1981

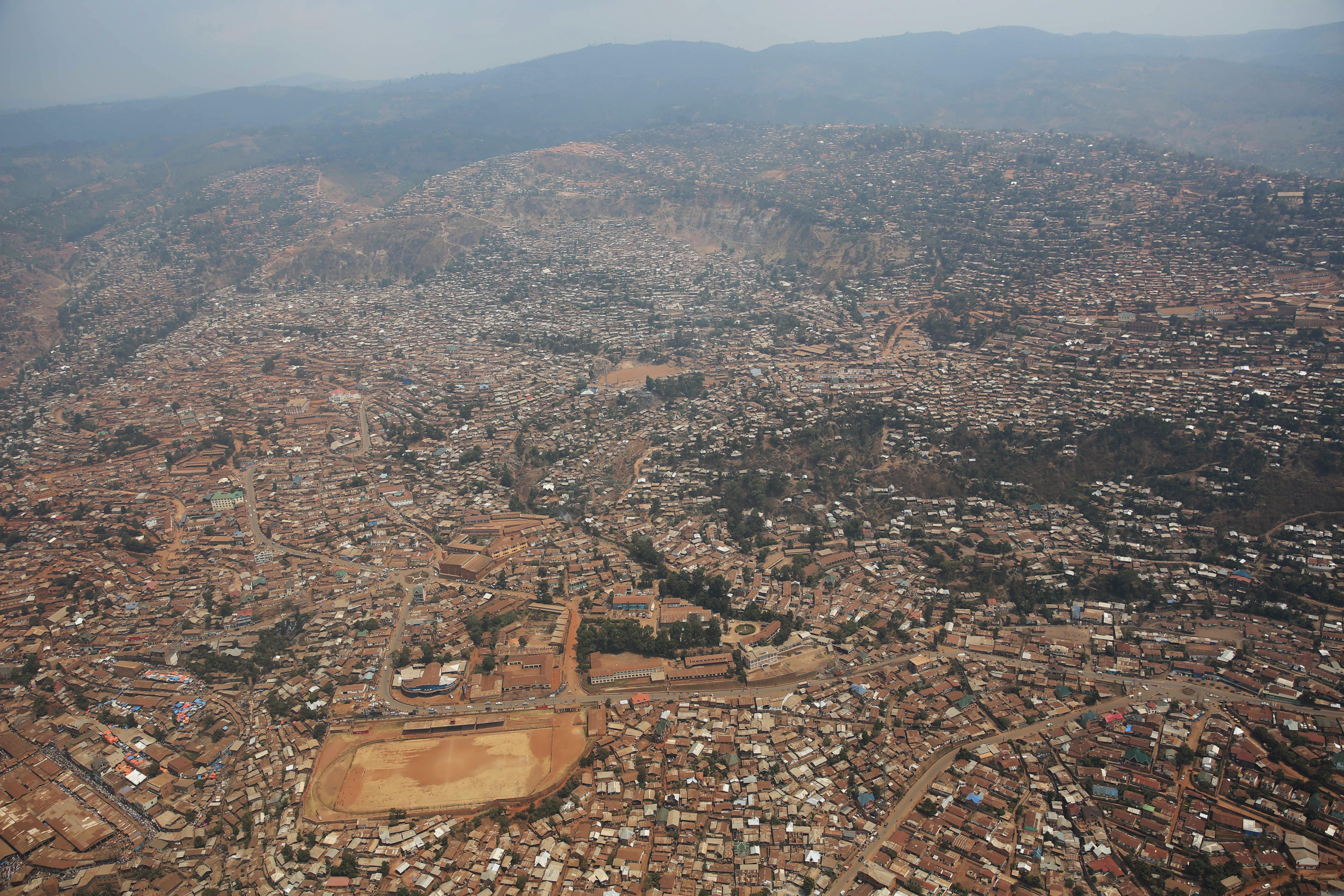
Aerial view of Bukavu, 2015

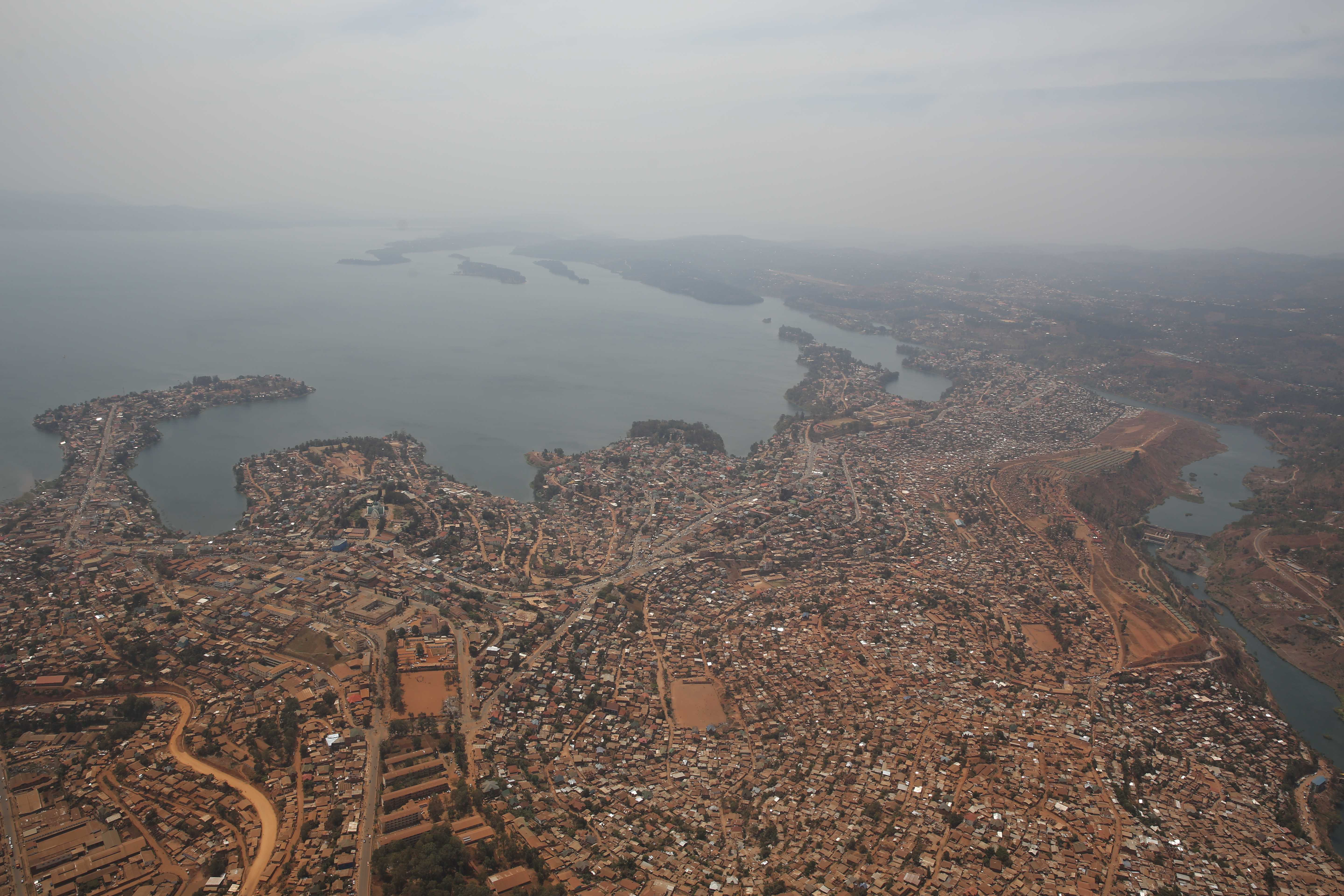
Aerial view of Bukavu and Lake Kivu, 2015
