= Timeline of Goma =

The following is a timeline of the history of the city of Goma, Democratic Republic of the Congo.

== 19th century ==
- 1890s - Goma occupied by agents of the Congo Free State as a trading post to control traffic on Lake Kivu; previously a way point for lake traffic and a crossroads for the overland trade routes between Central Africa and the Indian Ocean.

== 20th century ==
- 1910 - Goma confirmed as a Belgian possession in the Convention on the Lakes signed in Brussels on 14 May 1910 by plenipotentiaries of Belgium, Germany, and Great Britain.
- 1925 - Albert National Park established near Goma.
- 1959 - Roman Catholic Diocese of Goma founded.
- 1962 - Benezeth Moley becomes governor.^{(fr)}
- 1984 - Population: 77,908.
- 1988 - Goma becomes part of newly formed North Kivu province.
- 1993 - University of Goma established.
- 1994
  - Population: 161,956.
  - July: 850,000 Rwandan war refugees flee to Goma.
- 1996 - 2 November: Goma taken by Alliance of Democratic Forces for the Liberation of Congo.
- 1998 - 2 August: City taken by forces of Rally for Congolese Democracy–Goma.
- 2000
  - Yole!Africa cultural centre established.
  - Eugène Serufuli Ngayabaseka becomes governor of North Kivu province.^{(fr)}

== 21st century ==
- 2002 - January: Mount Nyiragongo erupts, destroys nearly half of city structures.
- 2004 - Population: 249,862 (estimate).
- 2006
  - Institut supérieur de statistique et de nouvelles technologies de Goma (school) founded.
  - Salaam Kivu International Film Festival begins.
- 2007
  - "New military operations centre for the FARDC" established.
  - Julien Paluku Kahongya becomes governor of North Kivu province.
- 2008
  - January: International peace conference held in Goma.
  - 15 April: Airplane crash occurs.
  - October: "Chaos grips...Goma as rebel forces advance."
- 2009
  - August: US secretary of state visits Goma.
  - Roger Rachid Tumbala becomes mayor (approximate date).
- 2011 - Jean Busanga Malihaseme appointed mayor.
- 2012
  - July: Battle of Goma (2012) begins.
  - 20 November: M23 forces take Goma.
  - 12 December: Prison break.
  - Kubuya Ndoole Naso becomes mayor.
- 2013

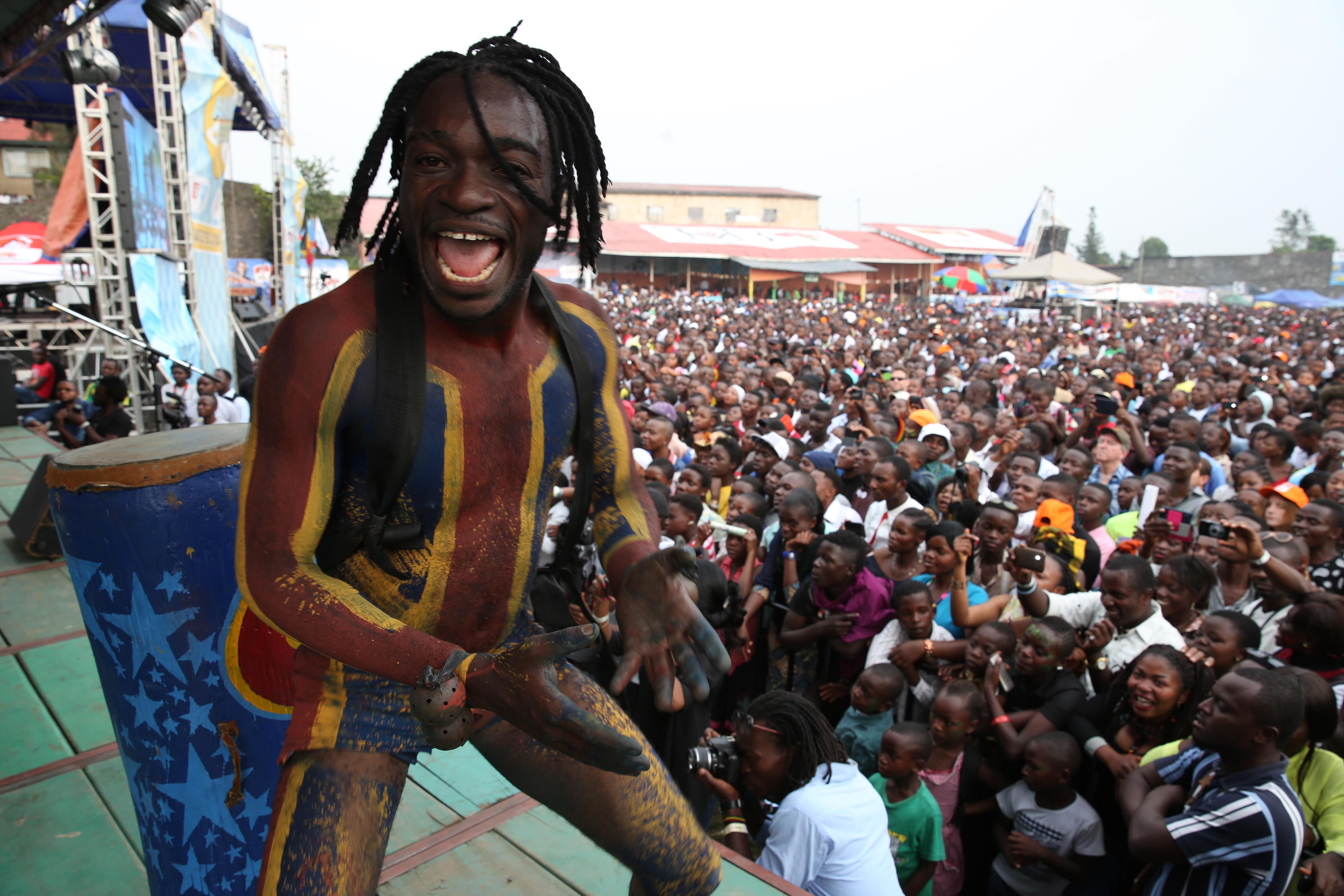
The Amani Festival in 2016

  - February: The first annual Amani Festival for peace takes place.
  - 4 March: Airplane crash occurs.
  - August: Heavy fighting occurs outside Goma during the M23 rebellion.
- 2015
  - January: 2015 Congolese protests.
  - June: Airport taken by "Mai-Mai fighters."
  - Dieudonné Malere becomes mayor.
  - Population: 368,165 (estimate).
- 2016 - November: United Nations forces attacked by bomb.
- 2022 - Festival Amani returns after a year's absence due to the COVID-19 pandemic.
- 2025
  - January: Battle of Goma.

== See also ==
- Goma history
- List of mayors of Goma
- Timelines of other cities in DR Congo: Bukavu, Kinshasa, Kisangani, Lubumbashi

== Bibliography ==
- Didier Bompangue; et al. (2009). "Cholera Epidemics, War and Disasters around Goma and Lake Kivu: An Eight-Year Survey". PLOS Neglected Tropical Diseases. 3 (5): e436. doi:10.1371/journal.pntd.0000436. PMC 2677153. PMID 19436726.
- Koen Vlassenroot; Karen Büscher (2009), City as frontier: urban development and identity processes in Goma, Crisis States Research Centre working papers, Crisis States Research Centre, London School of Economics and Political Science, ISSN 1749-1800
- Karen Büscher (2011). Conflict, state failure and urban transformation in the Eastern Congolese periphery: the case of Goma (PhD). Belgium: Ghent University. hdl:1854/LU-2092391.
- Thomas Gesthuizen (13 March 2013), "Congo's hidden cultural hub", The Guardian, UK

== Images ==
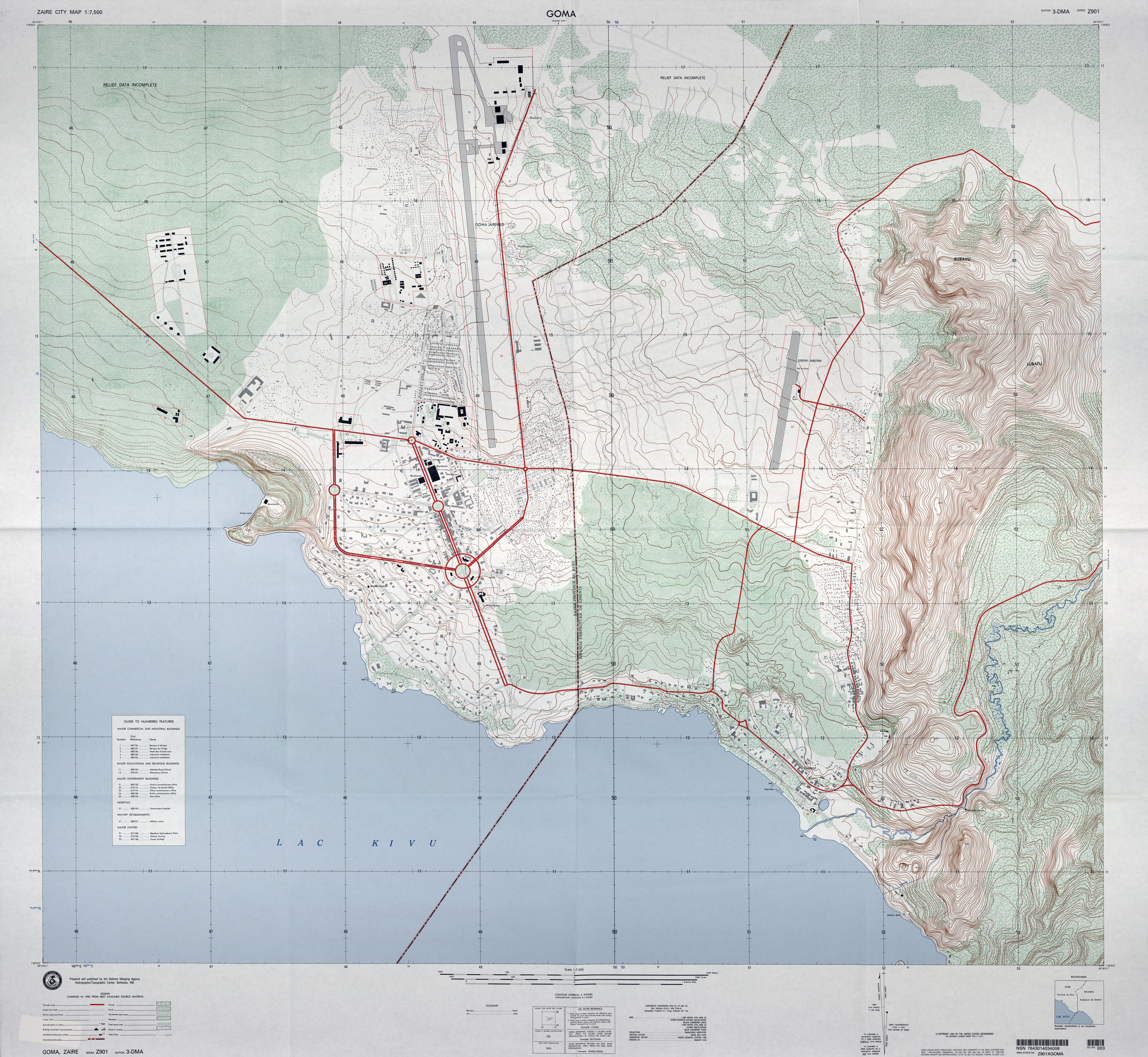
Map of Goma, 1982

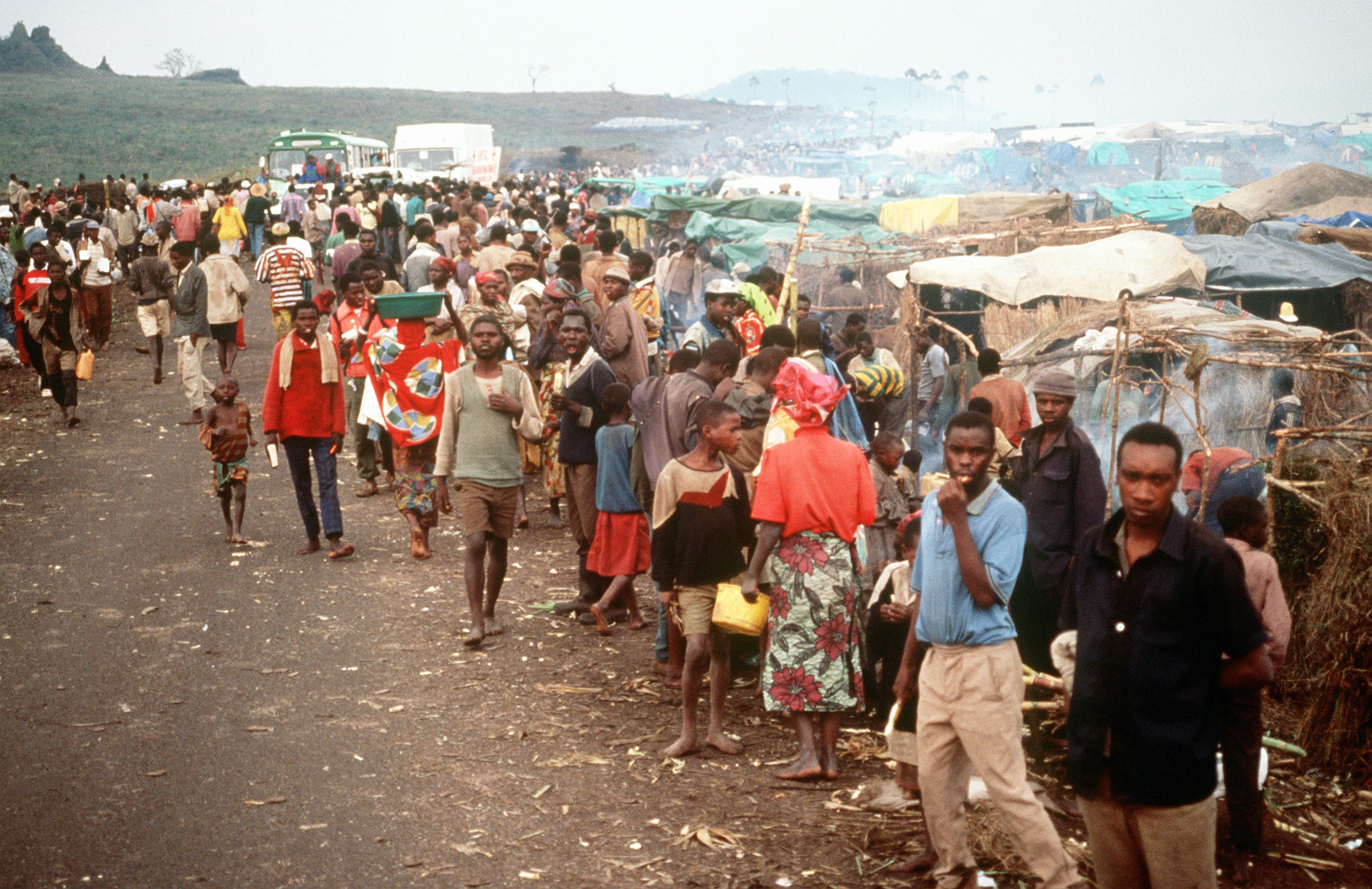
Refugee camp near Goma, 1994

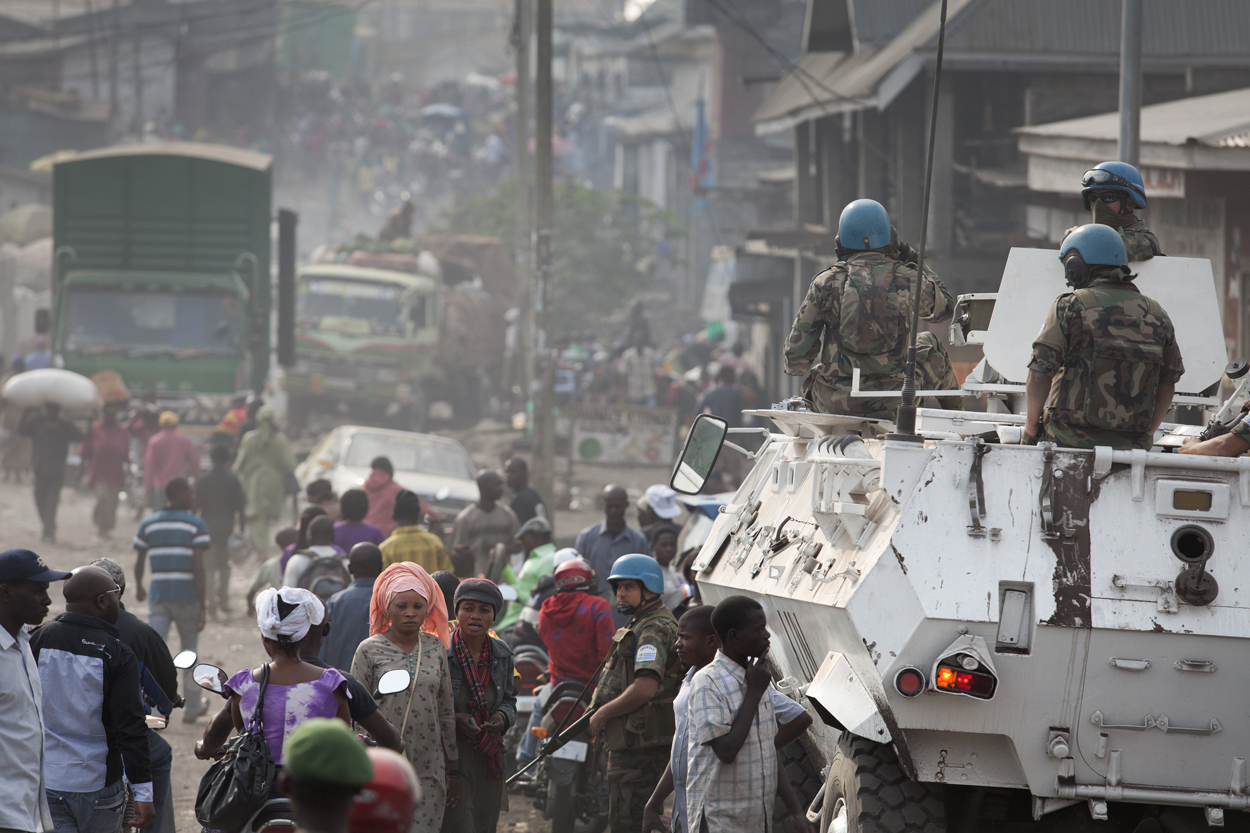
M-23 crisis in Goma, 2012

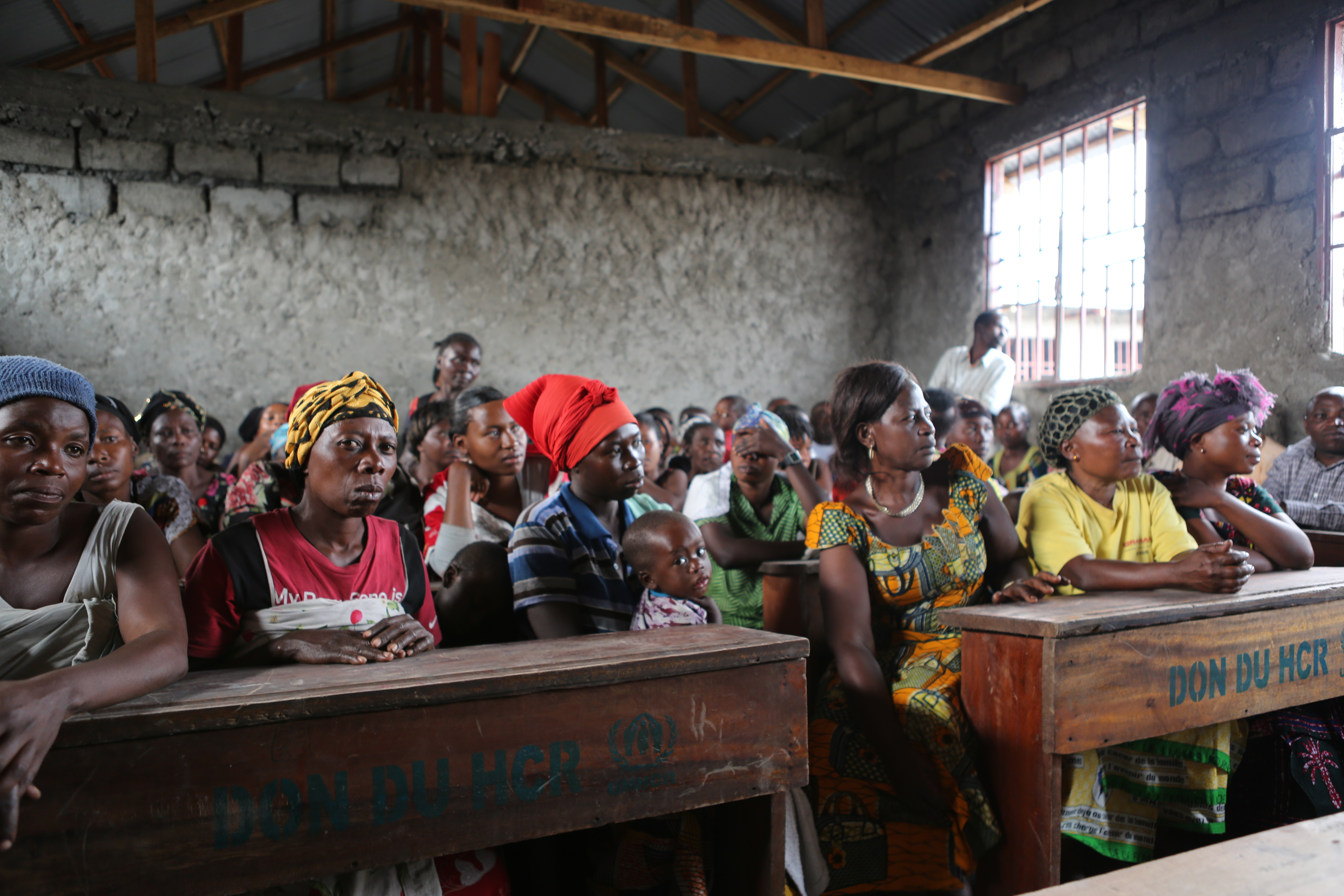
MONUSCO training, 2013

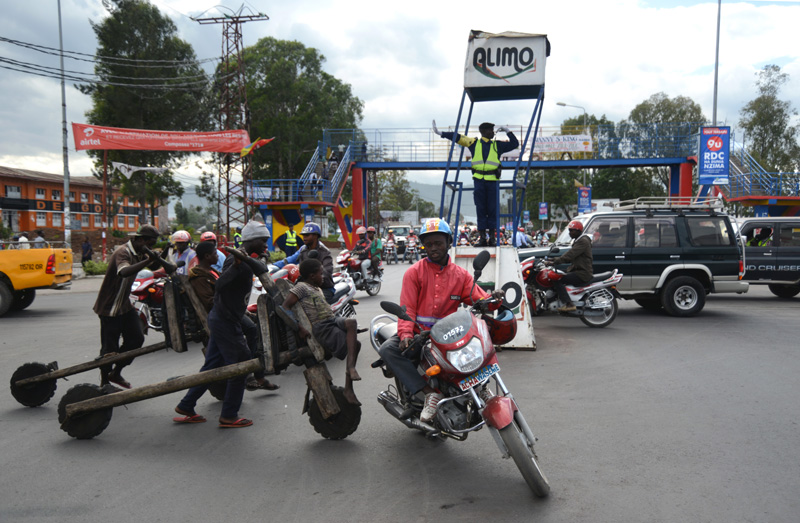
Boulevard Kanyamahanga traffic circle, Goma, 2013

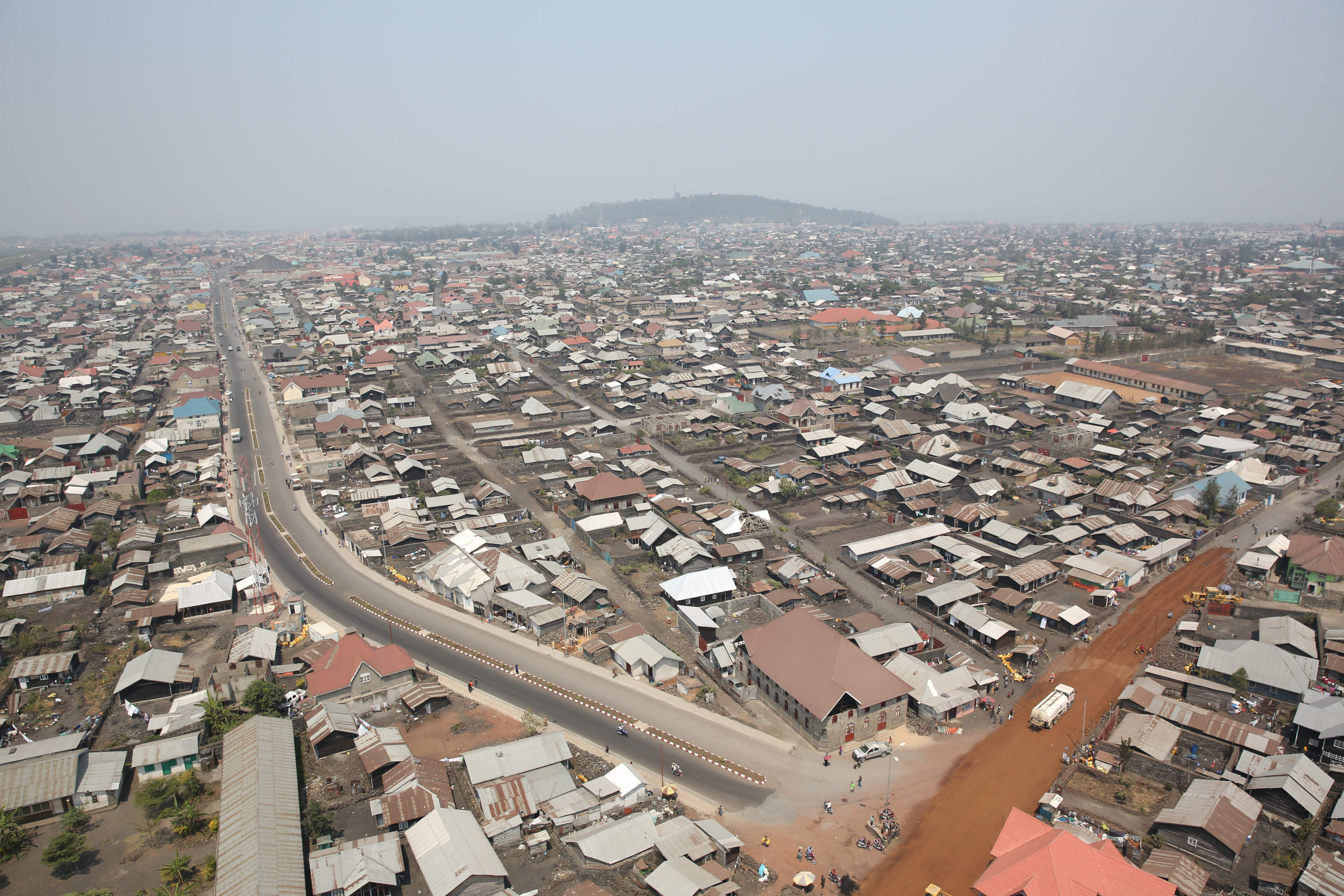
View of Goma, 2015

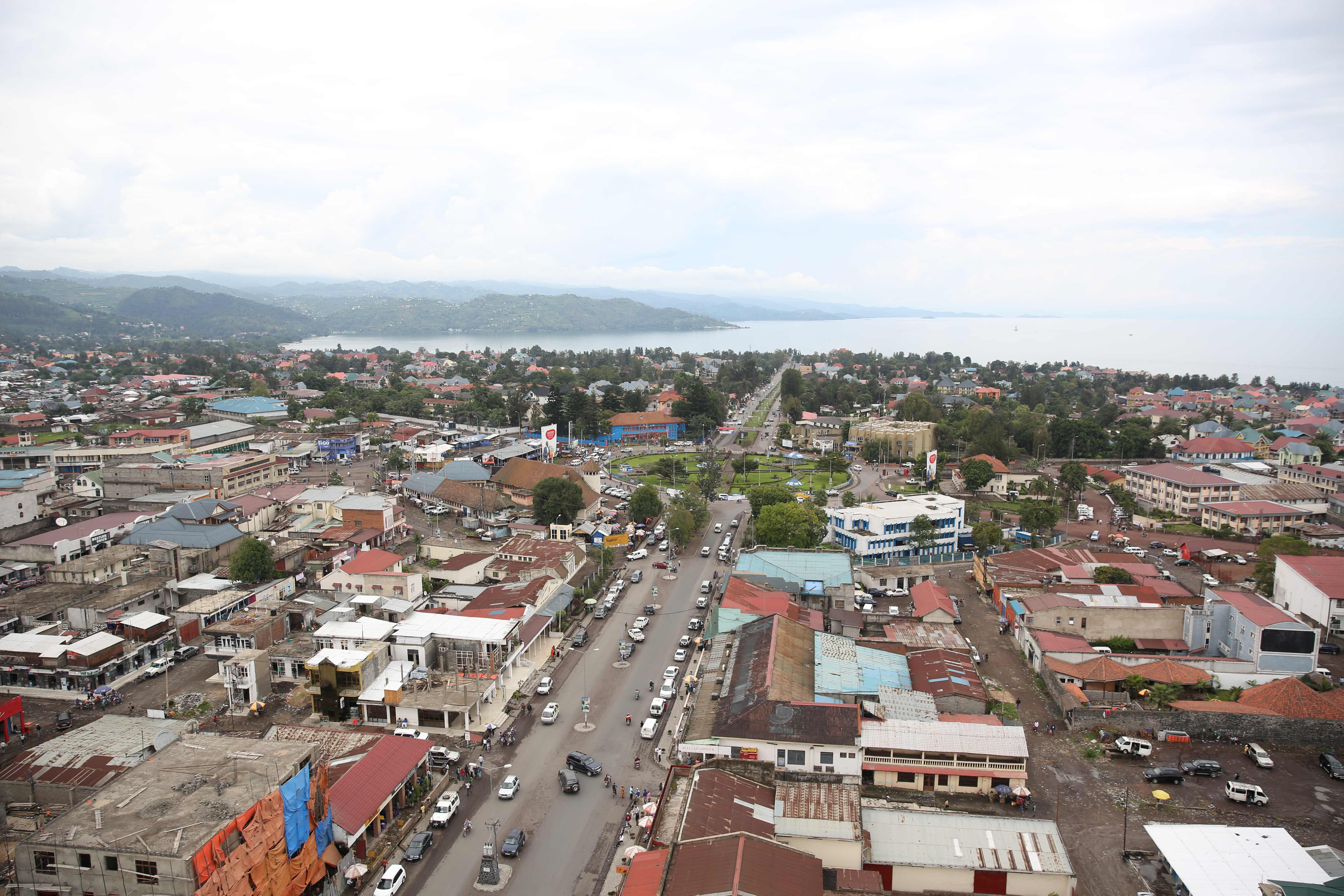
View of Goma, 2015
