= Zita Kavungirwa Kayange =

Congolese women's rights activist and politician

Mayor of Bukavu
- In office 2008–2010
- President: Joseph Kabila

Personal details
- Died: 26 May 2011 Kinshasa, Democratic Republic of the Congo
- Occupation: Women's rights activist, politician

Zita Kavungirwa Kayange (also Nzita Kavungirwa or Maman Zita; died 26 May 2011) was a women's rights activist and politician from the Democratic Republic of the Congo.

She was the first executive director of the women's organisation UWAKI. She was mayor of Bukavu from 2008 to 2010. She is the only woman who has led the city.

== Biography ==
=== Activism ===
Zita Kavungirwa was one of the first leaders of civil society in the former Kivu region. She defended the rights of rural women in Greater Kivu. She was the first executive director of UWAKI.

She also took part in other organisations in South Kivu. They included Solidarité Paysanne, APEF, COPROMAF and RFDP. She was the first president of the Caucus of Women of South Kivu, from 2003 to 2006. She worked with RFDP and the Caucus to restore peace in the east of the country. She spoke out against sexual violence used as a weapon of war.

In 2000, authorities of the rebel Rally for Congolese Democracy (RCD) summoned and threatened her. They suspected that she had helped organise a women's event in Goma on 8 March, International Women's Day. The event was a day of mourning for relatives killed in the war.

=== Political career ===
In 2006, she stood as a candidate in the first democratic elections in the country. She was not elected. She continued to campaign for women's rights.

On 25 September 2008, President Joseph Kabila appointed her mayor of Bukavu. Germain Balebwa Ramazani was appointed deputy mayor. She stayed in office for two years. She is the only woman who has led the city of Bukavu. On 6 August 2010, she resigned for personal reasons.

The head of the commune of Bagira also resigned at that time. On 8 September 2010, the Caucus of Women of South Kivu held a meeting in Bukavu. The meeting discussed the reasons why these women leaders had resigned.

Zita Kavungirwa died on 26 May 2011 in Kinshasa.
