= Ngaliema Bay =

Bay in Kinshasa, Democratic Republic of the Congo

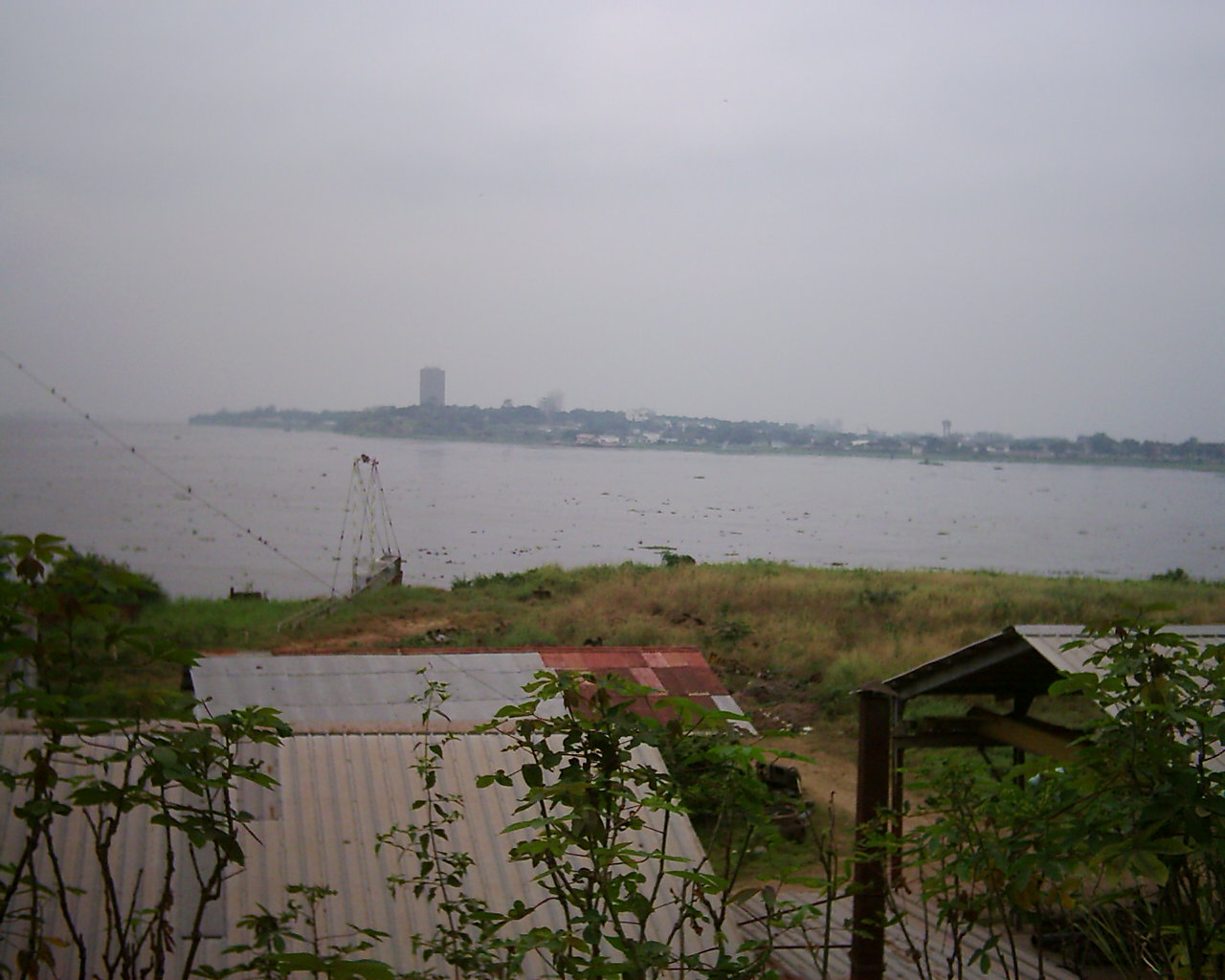
Ngaliema Bay

Ngaliema Bay is a bay located on the left bank of the Congo River, northwest of the city of Kinshasa, in the commune of Kintambo, near Livingstone Falls.

The bay was the site of an 1879 expedition led by Henry Morton Stanley to explore all of the Congo Basin. Shortly afterward, in 1881, Stanley established a trading post in the area, calling it Leopoldville, in honour of the sponsor of the expedition, Leopold II of Belgium. That post developed into modern-day Kinshasa.

The bay was used as a first port to the city. It owes its name to that of a local tribal chief, De Swata Ngaliema, who worked with Stanley.
