= Baudouin Liwanga =

Grand Admiral Baudouin Liwanga

Governor of Kinshasa
- In office 2006–2007
- Preceded by: Kimbembe Mazunga
- Succeeded by: André Kimbuta

Personal details
- Born: Baudouin Liwanga Mata Nyamunyobo; 1950 (age 75–76) Équateur, Belgian Congo

Military service
- Allegiance: Democratic Republic of the Congo
- Branch/service: Naval forces
- Years of service: ? — 2013
- Rank: Grand admiral
- Commands: Congolese Armed Forces

Grand Admiral Baudouin Liwanga Mata Nyamunyobo (born 1950) is a Congolese military officer and politician who has served as the Chief of Staff of the Armed Forces of the Democratic Republic of the Congo in 2002–2004 and as the governor of Kinshasa province in 2006–2007.

He was part of the fifth group of the Officer Training School (Ecole de formation d'officiers) at Kananga, and spent many years overseas, notably in the United States. A naval officer, he was appointed chief of staff of the naval forces under Joseph Mobutu. In August 1998, he was named commandant of the naval forces and promoted major-general in September 1999. He was named commandant of the naval forces in September 1999, he was promoted lieutenant general (amiral for the naval forces), and then armed forces chief of staff on 24 February 2002. He served as Chief of Staff of the Naval Forces under President Laurent Kabila.

He was chief of staff of the Armed Forces of the Democratic Republic of the Congo from July–August 2003 to 2004. His appointment was promulgated by Decree No.17/2003 portant nomination des officiers de l'Etat Major General des Forces Armees Congolaises, of 19 August 2003. That decree listed his Matricule service number as 104309/K.

He was replaced by Lieutenant General Kisempia Sungilanga in June 2004.

He is also a former governor of Kinshasa.

An announcement of his retirement was made by Ordonnance 13/082 of 13 July 2013. It is not clear what post he held between 2003 and 2013.

In 2018 he was listed as with the rank of grand admiral.

Political offices
Preceded by Kimbembe Mazunga	Governor of Kinshasa; 2006–2007	Succeeded by André Kimbuta
Military offices
Preceded by Sylvestre Lwetcha	Chief of Staff of the Armed Forces of the Democratic Republic of the Congo; 2003–2004	Succeeded by Kisempia Sungilanga
Unknown	Chief of Staff of the FARDC Navy; 1998—2003	Succeeded by Dieudonne Amuli Bahigwa
