= André Kimbuta =

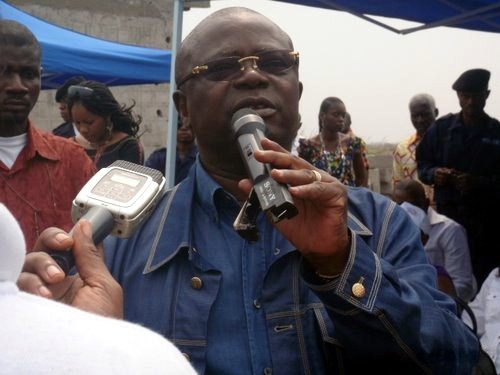

Governor of Kinshasa
- In office March 16, 2007 – 2019
- Preceded by: Baudoin Liwanga
- Succeeded by: Gentiny Ngobila Mbala

Personal details
- Born: 15 June 1954 (age 71) Kikwit, Belgian Congo

André Kimbuta (born 15 June 1954) is a Congolese politician and a former Governor of Kinshasa.

== The Boteti affair ==
Daniel Boteti, the vice-president of the Provincial Assembly of Kinshasa, was murdered on July 6, 2008. Patrick Mwewa, who was along with five others charged with the killing, alleged before a military tribunal on July 18 that Yango had ordered Boteti's death, offering Mwewa $1,200 to take part in the murder. Kimbuta's spokesperson Therese Olenga said that the testimony was filled with "contradictions".

Preceded by Adm. Baudoin Liwanga	Governor of Kinshasa; 2007–2019	Succeeded by Gentiny Ngobila Mbala
