= List of television stations in Kinshasa =

This is a list of television stations based in or broadcasting from Kinshasa, the capital city of the Democratic Republic of the Congo.

== Television stations ==
- Action Missionaire d'Évangélisation des nations TV (AMEN TV)
- Antenne A
- Canal Tropical Télévision (Tropicana TV)
- CMB TV
- COULEURS TELEVISION
- Radio Télévision Message de Vie (RTMV)
- Radio-Télévision nationale congolaise (RTNC) : RTNC1, RTNC2, RTNC3, RTNC4)
- Raga TV, Raga+
- Télévision Kin Malebo
- Canal le chemin la verite et la vie (CVV)
- Nzondo TV
- Radio Télévision Catholique Elikya (RTCE)
- Radio Télévision Sentinelle
- Tropicana TV
- Radio Télévision Puissance (RTP)
- Canal Future
- Radio Télévision la voix de l'aigle (RTVA)
- Radio Télévision armée de l'éternel (RTAE)
- RTGA
- Radio Télévision Kintuadi (RTK)
- Digital Congo
