= Kimbembe Mazunga =

Kimbembe Mazunga (born December 11, 1956, in Kinshasa) is a civil engineer in mechanics, and has been working at "Office des routes" since 1986; he was the governor of the city-province of Kinshasa, Democratic Republic of the Congo, from November 15, 2005 to October 16, 2006. Originally from the province of Bas-Congo, he is a member of the People's Party for Reconstruction and Development (PPRD), the party of the DRC's former president, Joseph Kabila.

He previously served as Minister of Public Works, National Planning, Urbanism and Habitat during the Transitional Government under Joseph Kabila from November 2002 to July 2003 and was hired as senior advisor to the Chief of State in charge of Infrastructures in March 2005. In November 2005, he was selected by Kabila's son to replace Jean Kimbunda Mudikela as governor of Kinshasa. Tabu Ley Rochereau, a famous internationally known singer was one of his three Vice-Governors, he was in charge of political, administrative, and socio-cultural questions.

In October 2006, Kimbembe Mazunga was replaced by Admiral Baudoin Liwanga while he was called back at the Presidency to serve, once again, as senior advisor to the President in charge of infrastructures and national planning. He is assuming these functions till now.

Preceded by Jean Kimbunda	Governor of Kinshasa; 2005–2006	Succeeded by Adm. Baudoin Liwanga
