= Bruce Fetter =

- Born: Bruce Sigmund Fetter; 8 June 1938; Ashland, Kentucky, United States
- Died: 20 April 2017 (aged 78); Milwaukee, Wisconsin, United States

Academic background
- Education: University of Wisconsin-Madison
- Doctoral advisor: Jan Vansina

Academic work
- Discipline: History
- Sub-discipline: History of the Democratic Republic of the Congo; Urban history; Historical demography
- Institutions: University of Wisconsin–Milwaukee

Bruce Sigmund Fetter (8 June 1938 – 20 April 2017) was an American academic historian, social scientist, and Africanist. His particular research interests lay in the field of urban history, historical demography, and subsequently public health. Fetter was a professor of history at University of Wisconsin–Milwaukee from 1967 to 2009.

== Biography ==
Fetter was born in Ashland, Kentucky in the United States on 8 June 1938. He pursued undergraduate studies at Harvard University in 1960 and gained a Master of Philosophy (MPhil) from Oxford University. He gained a doctorate from the University of Wisconsin-Madison in 1968 dealing with the urban history of Lubumbashi (formerly Elisabethville) under Belgian colonial rule entitled "Elisabethville and Lubumbashi: The Segmented Growth of a Colonial City, 1910–1945". His supervisor was Jan Vansina.

After finishing his doctoral studies, Fetter received tenure at the University of Wisconsin-Milawuakee in 1967. His doctoral thesis was published as The Creation of Elisabethville, 1910–1940 (1976) and has been described as "the first book-length study of a colonial African city". Fetter continued to research and write about the history of Central Africa. He co-edited an anthology of primary sources entitled Colonial Rule in Africa (1979) and wrote Colonial Rule and Regional Imbalance in Central Africa (1983). He remained interested in urban history and was co-editor of the journal Urbanism Past and Present from 1975 to 1985.

Subsequently, Fetter became increasingly interested in historical demography and public health. He co-edited Demography from Scanty Evidence: Central Africa in the Colonial Era (1990) which received enthusiastic reviews.

Fetter died of cancer at Milwaukee, Wisconsin on 20 April 2017, aged 78.
