= List of newspapers in the Democratic Republic of the Congo =

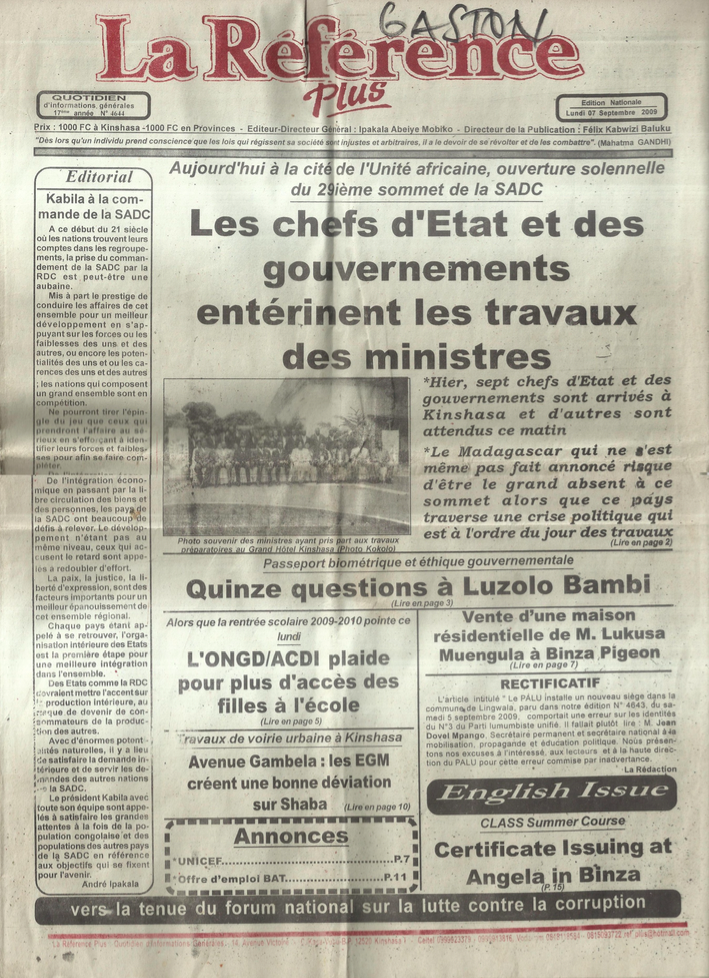
Référence Plus, 2009

The following is a list of newspapers in the Democratic Republic of the Congo.

== List of publications ==
Title	Locale	First issued	Notes
L'Avenir	Kinshasa	1996	
La Conscience	Kinshasa	1990	
Elima	Kinshasa	1928	
Mjumbe	Lubumbashi	1963	
Mukuba	Lubumbashi		
L'Observateur	Kinshasa		
Le Phare	Kinshasa	1983	
Le Potentiel			
La Prospérité	Kinshasa		
La Référence Plus	Kinshasa		
La République	Kinshasa		
Salongo	Kinshasa	1972	
Le Soft international	Kinshasa	1990	
La Tempête des Tropiques	Kinshasa		

== Defunct ==
Title	Locale	Years	Notes
L’Avenir Colonial Belge	Léopoldville	1920-?	
Le Courrier d’Afrique	Léopoldville	1930-1972	
L’Echo de Stan			
L'Écho du Katanga	Elisabethville	1931-1962	
L'Essor du Congo	Elisabethville	1928-?	
Hodi	Costermansville	1942-?	In Swahili and French
Journal du Katanga	Elisabethville	1911-?	
La Presse Africaine	Bukavu	1953-?	
Le Stanleyvillois	Province Orientale		

== See also ==
- Media of the Democratic Republic of the Congo
- Democratic Republic of the Congo literature
- Union nationale de la presse congolaise

== Bibliography ==
in English

- "Democratic Republic of the Congo: Directory: the Press". Africa South of the Sahara 2004. Regional Surveys of the World. Europa Publications. 2004. p. 300+. ISBN 1857431839.
- Jonathon Green; Nicholas J. Karolides (2005). "Democratic Republic of Congo". Encyclopedia of Censorship. Facts on File, Inc. ISBN 978-1-4381-1001-1.
- "Democratic Republic of Congo", Freedom of the Press, USA: Freedom House, 2016, OCLC 57509361

in French

- "La presse quotidienne au Congo". Courrier Hebdomadaire du CRISP (in French) (26). Brussels: Centre de recherche et d'information socio-politiques: 1. 1959. doi:10.3917/cris.026.0001 – via Cairn.info.
- Albert-Oscar Bolela (1971), "Un aperçu de la presse congolaise écrite par les noirs de 1885 à 1960", Zaïre-Afrique (in French), vol. 11, pp. 5–23, ISSN 0010-5767
- Mukala Kadima Nzuji [in French] (1984). La littérature zaïroise de langue française: 1945-1965 (in French). Éditions Karthala. ISBN 978-2-86537-100-6.
