= Théophile Mbemba Fundu =

Congolese politician (born 1952)

Théophile Mbemba Fundu (born 16 March 1952) was the Interior Minister of the Democratic Republic of Congo from 2001 until 2006. He was governor of Kinshasa from 1997 until 2001.

== See also ==
- Ituri conflict
