= Floribert Kaseba Makunko =

Floribert Kaseba Makunko (died 21 January 2014, in Belgium) served as ambassador to Zambia for the Democratic Republic of the Congo. From 2006 he served as a member of the National Assembly for the city of Lubumbashi in Katanga Province (in 2009, Haut-Katanga District) and as mayor of Lubumbashi from 1997 to 2006.

A decree of November 15, 2005 the President of the Republic, Joseph Kabila, confirmed Floribert Kaseba in these functions as mayor of Lubumbashi.

His many works advocating to clean the city of Lubumbashi have earned him the nickname "Bulaya 2000".

Floribert Kaseba Makunko has also invested in the campaign to the culture of peace and tolerance. He managed to bring together the Katangan and kasaïens under the ousted regime of Mobutu. This struggle has won him in March 2002, the Unesco Prize "City for Peace" for Africa 2000-2001, which was awarded to Marrakesh in Morocco during the sitting of the 107th Inter-Parliamentary Conference of Members francophones.
