= Bena Tshadi football lightning strike =

1998 natural disaster in Kasaï-Central, DR Congo

- Date: 24–25 October 1998
- Location: Bena Tshadi, Kasaï-Occidental, Democratic Republic of the Congo
- Type: Natural disaster & mass casualty event
- Cause: Lightning strike
- Deaths: 11
- Injuries: 30

In October 1998, a lightning strike occurred at a competitive association football match in Bena Tshadi, a village of Dimbelenge Territory, Kasaï-Central, Democratic Republic of the Congo. Reports stated that the strike killed all 11 players of the Bena Tshadi football club and injured 30 others, while members of the visiting team, the Basanga football club, were unharmed.

The lightning strike gained international coverage. Media outside of the Congo noted that the incident could not be verified and later retrospectives have called the exact details of the event into question.

== Background ==
The Democratic Republic of the Congo has the highest global frequency of lightning strikes of any country. According to The Herald, the weekend during which the match was played had heavy rainfall and thunderstorms across central DRC. A boy had drowned during flooding caused by the storms the same weekend in Kinshasa.

=== George Goch Stadium incident ===
On 25 October, during a South African Premiership match between the Moroka Swallows F.C. and the Jomo Cosmos F.C. at George Goch Stadium in Johannesburg, four Moroka Swallow players, including Peter Matshitse, Jokhonia Cibi, and Benjamin Njemo, and two Jomo Cosmos players, including Andrew Rabutla, were injured when lightning struck the field. Matshitse, Cibi, and Njemo were knocked unconscious, while other players writhed on the ground in pain, rubbing their ears and eyes.

Two of the players sustained serious injuries and all of the affected players were treated for shock and irregular heartbeats. At the time of the initial reports, a seventh player and a referee were unharmed. It was later reported that two other Swallows players, Joseph Rapelego and Martial Chimbousou, and one Jomo Cosmos player, Phumlani Dindi, had suffered "lesser injuries". The score at the time was 0–2 for the Jomo Cosmos. The incident was recorded on television broadcasts, with BBC correspondent Jeremy Vine corroborating on-site accounts. The match was repeated on 4 November and resulted in a 2–2 draw.

The coach of the Jomo Cosmos team accused the Moroka Swallows of using the lightning strike for diving, claiming that some players faked injury due to the losing score. According to Swallows players Peter Matshitse and Lucas Sebona, they suspected that the Cosmos used muti to cause the lightning, claiming that both teams made use of muti in their matches. Cosmos goalkeeper Silver Shabalala stated that his team had indeed used the services of a witch doctor from the Congo to score more goals than the Swallows by breaking a coconut in a ritualistic ceremony. Shabalala claimed that on the day of the lightning strike, the witch doctor was shocked when the coconut contained no water and voiced uncertainty over what would happen beyond "a difficult game".

== Incident ==
On the weekend of 24–25 October, the match was held in Bena Tshadi against Basanga, a neighbouring village. The players were between the ages of 20 and 35. With the score level at 1–1, a bolt of lightning struck the pitch and killed all 11 members of the Bena Tshadi team playing at the time. There were an additional 30 injuries, reportedly consisting of spectators and other Bena Tshadi players on the sidelines, who sustained non-life-threatening burns. No Basanga players were harmed.

The sole source for the incident was L'Avenir newspaper. Due to the ongoing Second Congo War, as well as the remote location of Bena Tshadi, the report could not be independently substantiated.

== Aftermath ==
=== Accusations of witchcraft ===
After the strike, all members of the Basanga team were reportedly completely unscathed. As football teams in Kasaï were known to employ the use of witch doctors as a means to influence matches, along with the closely tied score at the time of the strike, there were widespread conspiracy theories among local citizens and investigators regarding the involvement of the Basanga team, which accused them of using witchcraft to induce a targeted lightning strike. A report by the Congo News Agency from 28 October, again quoting L'Avenir, supported this theory, stating: "The exact nature of the lightning has divided the population in this region which is known for its use of fetishes in football." These accusations could have also been raised because of the political climate of the ongoing civil war.

=== Skepticism ===
As of 2021, there were no known follow-up reports on the event, nor were there any testimonies by witnesses or family members of the victims. No official cause was assigned to the death of one team over the other. Despite a lack of verification, the lightning strike was widely reported on internationally and unofficial theories were spread and repeated as fact in the years that followed the incident. One of the most commonly repeated rumours, often falsely attributed to The Guardian, explained the one-sided fatality distribution as having likely stemmed from the Bena Tshadi players wearing screw-in metal studs, which conducted electricity, whereas Basanga wore molded cleats, variously described as rubber or plastic. However, Angeline Smith of Stadium Talk voiced skepticism of the theory, writing "The immense power of a lightning strike would overwhelm any difference in the footwear material". HITC Sevens also noted that L'Avenir newspaper was part of the pro-Kabila government Groupe L'Avenir, owned by parliament member Pius Mwabilu, and speculated that the report, due to the improbable nature of the lightning strike and no other corroborating accounts, may have either been a sensationalist exaggeration or a form of wartime propaganda.

== See also ==
- List of association footballers who died after on-field incidents
- List of unusual deaths in the 20th century
