= Mass media in the Democratic Republic of the Congo =

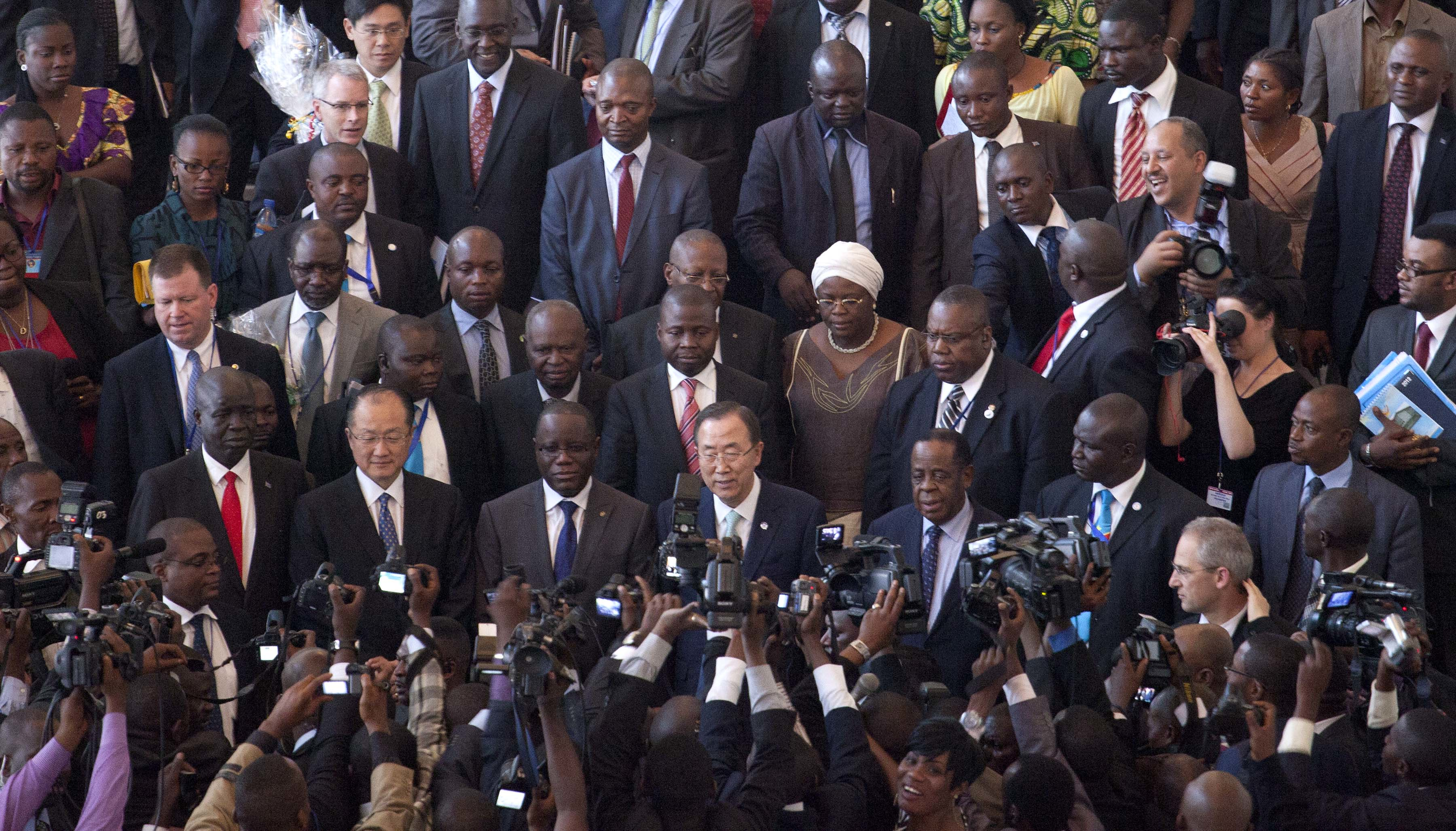
Press Conference of World Bank Leaders in the DRC

Mass media in the Democratic Republic of the Congo are nationally and internationally state-owned and operated.

== History ==
Pluralism and press independence in the Congo emerged before independence in the Belgian Congo. At independence, privately owned newspapers operated under a liberal legal framework derived from the 1959 decrees on public freedoms. This framework remained in place until 1965. Following Mobutu's rise to power, the regime recognized the press's influence on public opinion and, between 1965 and 1972, sought to acquire several publications by installing its supporters in key positions and covertly financing them.

According to Congolese author and information and communication sciences researcher Patrick De Favre Bintene, 1972 was a pivotal year in the history of the Congo's media. The Zairian doctrine of the "return to authenticity" (recours à l'authenticité), according to Bintene, led to a strategy aimed at reducing the mass media's structural dependence. This policy emphasized the promotion of national culture. In 1972, Congolese newspapers adopted Zairian names, and a press emerged that was written wholly or partly in national languages. That same year, all newspapers were brought under state control, with the state providing the resources necessary for their operation.

The favorable economic conditions that lasted until 1975 enabled the state to subsidize state-owned newspapers. However, the economic crisis that began in 1975 following nationalization left the state unable to support all of them. As a result, subsidies were restricted: Elima and Salongo received larger amounts than other newspapers, while overall funding became increasingly insufficient. Before independence, some Congolese-owned newspapers contributed to political awareness among the population. After independence, newspapers became associated with particular political groups, while the organization of the press developed more systematically under the Second Republic. Under the supervision of the Ministry of Information, the Congolese press covered national and international current affairs, including politics, social issues, economics, culture, and sports. Under the Second Republic, the press was also incorporated into the state's ideological and political objectives associated with the Authentic Zairian Revolution.

Print media by province, 1978

Province/region	Newspaper/print media	Periodicity
Kinshasa	Salongo	Daily
Kinshasa	Elima	Daily
Kinshasa	Zaïre	Weekly
Kinshasa	Masano	Weekly
Kinshasa	Zaïre ya Sika	Monthly
Kinshasa	Likembe	Biweekly
Bas-Congo and Bandundu	Beto na Beto	Weekly
Kasaï-Occidental and Kasaï-Oriental	Nsambi	Weekly
Haut-Congo	Boyoma	Daily
Kivu	Jua	Daily
Shaba	Mjumbe	Daily

Source: Document No. 075/I.M.K./355/78, N'Sele, March 1978, as reproduced in Patrick de Favre Bintene, Problématique du rôle controversé des médias dans la résolution des conflits en RDC: analyse critique de l'opérationnalité concrète des médias pour la paix, Université de Kinshasa, Licence, 2010.

Elima and Salongo echoed the government's political messaging, with one authorized newspaper operating in each province, including Mjumbe in Lubumbashi, Boyoma in Kisangani, and Jua in Bukavu. The Catholic Church also operated its own publications, which were officially excluded from political activity. Other publications were legally permitted but appeared irregularly. Journalists had to exercise considerable caution to avoid criticism of the president that could be perceived as challenging his authority. This political climate was particularly evident during Dominique Sakombi Inongo's tenure as Minister of Information, when national television routinely portrayed Mobutu in highly symbolic imagery before the evening news.

In 1981, Ordinance-Law No. 81-011 of 2 April 1981, which amended Ordinance-Law No. 070-057, introduced a more liberal legal framework for the press and facilitated the emergence of new newspaper titles. These publications followed different trajectories: some proved financially unsustainable and became closely aligned with the authorities, while others presented themselves as independent newspapers. Although the ordinance formally liberalized the press sector, state influence remained substantial, and much of the press continued to operate within the state-party system. The regime tasked newspapers with mobilizing and informing the population, while publishers subsequently sought renewed state assistance. Much of the press continued to focus on the president's activities and the ideology of the single-party MPR. The 1981 ordinance formally recognized press freedom by requiring only a declaration to the Ministry for publication, while holding publishers civilly and criminally liable for their content. In practice, however, the formal liberalization of the press did not necessarily translate into effective independence from state control.

=== Liberalization ===
In April 1990, Mobutu announced the liberalization of political activities and accepted the existence of political organizations outside the MPR, which had previously been the country's sole political party. The press had begun to gain greater editorial independence as early as 1989, taking advantage of the emerging political openings. New political parties also emerged, and new newspapers were established, often by politicians seeking to challenge the regime or gain political visibility. Newsrooms subsequently experienced an influx of members of the new political class, many of whom began working as journalists. This expansion of political journalism also raised concerns about professional standards, with some publications replacing political debate with personal attacks and personal disputes. Student journalists also entered newsrooms in increasing numbers, although their professional status remained contested.

After initially welcoming the expansion of the press, public criticism of newspapers increased as some publications were increasingly accused of violating standards of journalistic conduct and privacy. Many former pro-government newspapers subsequently shifted their support to the opposition. The end of the Cold War also contributed to political change in Africa, as international and domestic pressures intensified and several authoritarian governments made political concessions. During this period, 365 press organizations were authorized to publish, while approximately 400 political parties emerged. In this context, newspapers increasingly aligned themselves with either the opposition, including Le Potentiel, Le Phare, Elima, Umoja, La Référence Plus, or the presidential camp, including L'Avenir, Le Soft, Le Finance, and Salongo. Despite the expansion of political and media pluralism, the authorities continued to restrict press freedom, and journalists remained exposed to threats and violence. Mobutu subsequently sought to reverse some of the concessions he had made.

Democratization also affected the provinces. From 1992, private radio stations began to emerge and expand, including Radio Maendeleo in Bukavu (1993), established by local NGOs; Radio Zénith in Lubumbashi (1994); and Radio Amani in Kisangani (1995). In Kinshasa, religious stations predominated. Alongside Radio Elikya, established by the Catholic Church in 1995, and the Protestant Radio Sango Malamu, evangelical and messianic stations such as Radiotélévision Puissance, Radio Message de Vie, and Radio-Télévision Armée de l'Éternel also emerged. Private commercial and community stations, including Raga FM, RTKM, MBC, and Réveil FM, further diversified the radio sector.

Private television also developed rapidly in Kinshasa. Antenne A, established in 1991, was followed by Canal Kin and Canal Z (now CCTV) and by numerous private commercial channels, including Raga TV, Télé Kin Malebo, and Tropicana TV. Religious television channels also emerged, including Télévision Sango Malamu, Amen Télévision, Radio Télévision Sentinelle, and Radio Télévision Kintwadi. Many of these television stations grew out of existing radio stations and shared personnel and equipment with them.

=== Press under Laurent-Désiré Kabila and Joseph Kabila ===
Laurent-Désiré Kabila came to power in 1997 and renamed the country the Democratic Republic of the Congo (DRC), ending the use of the name Zaire. Press and freedom of expression remained restricted, which continued several practices established under Mobutu. Kabila also banned political parties, while several political and press freedoms introduced during the preceding period were subsequently curtailed. Press organizations faced restrictions on their editorial activities and sources of funding, while the new regime adopted increasingly restrictive measures toward journalists. Arrests, imprisonment, intimidation, and violence against media professionals increased; more than 160 journalists were reportedly imprisoned between May 1997 and January 2001. The outbreak of the Second Congo War in 1998 also restricted the operating environment for the media, while anti-Rwandan rhetoric became increasingly prominent in parts of the press. These conditions contributed to the creation of Journaliste en Danger (JED).

Following Laurent-Désiré Kabila's death, his son, Joseph Kabila, succeeded him. Media actors initially questioned whether he would maintain his predecessor's policies. However, in his inaugural speech, Joseph Kabila pledged to guarantee public and fundamental freedoms. In February 2002, he authorized political negotiations in consultation with the RCD, led by Azarias Ruberwa, and the MLC, led by Jean-Pierre Bemba. The peace process and the withdrawal of Rwandan and Ugandan troops helped reduce pressure on the media, particularly in eastern Congo. The transition, jointly led by the principal political forces and supported by substantial international involvement, also created more favorable conditions for press freedom. Nevertheless, media coverage remained highly politicized: political issues dominated reporting, while many outlets adopted explicit political positions. The media also became polarized between pro-Kabila and pro-Bemba outlets. Journalists continued to face insecurity, including unresolved killings.

During this period, media professionals sought to support their professional organization and overcome political divisions within the profession. In March 2004, the National Congress of the Congolese Press took place as part of an effort described as a "refoundation" of the press. The congress led to the creation of new professional structures intended to provide broader representation and enable journalists to contribute more effectively to the transition process.

During the transition, restructuring the sector became a priority with the establishment of the High Media Authority (HAM, now the Conseil Supérieur de l'Audiovisuel et de la Communication), the National Union of the Congolese Press (Union nationale de la presse congolaise; UNPC), and the Congolese Media Observatory (Observatoire congolais des médias; OMEC). Within less than two decades, the Congolese media sector evolved from a system dominated by government-controlled outlets into a more pluralistic sector, although media organizations remained unevenly distributed geographically. By October 2008, the DRC had 341 broadcasting stations, including only one, Radio Okapi, with nationwide coverage, and more than 600 registered press titles, most of which were published irregularly. The country also had 82 television channels, three of which—RTNC, Digital Congo, and Radio Télévision du Groupe L'Avenir (RTG@)—could transmit by satellite from Kinshasa for retransmission in some provinces.

Media activity was concentrated in Kinshasa, which had 51 free-to-air television channels, approximately 41 FM radio stations, 10 daily newspapers, 15 periodicals, and about 20 irregularly published newspapers. The audiovisual sector comprised several types of operators. Community and associative organizations accounted for 133 radio stations nationwide, only three of them in Kinshasa, but had a limited presence in television, with three stations. The 91 private commercial operators nationwide were generally multimedia organizations combining radio and television. They coexisted with 104 religious broadcasters affiliated with the Catholic, Protestant, and Kimbanguist Churches and, particularly in Kinshasa, with Revival churches.

The media sector also included public media, including RTNC and its provincial stations; the Radio Okapi; and international radio stations broadcasting on FM or through local relay stations. During this period, the expansion of press freedom contributed to the growth of radio and television. However, economic sustainability remained a major concern, particularly regarding the financial independence of media organizations. Since the colonial period, the DRC has lacked a legal system of state subsidies for the press. This raises questions about the implementation of Law No. 002/96, particularly its provisions concerning state support for the press.

=== Constitution ===
The DRC's constitution was established in 1964 to bolster the presidency post-independence. It underwent revisions during the country's transition to Zaire in 1971 under President Mobutu. Further changes followed until a transitional constitution was adopted in 2003, as part of the 2002 Global and Inclusive Agreement in Sun City, South Africa. The current constitution took effect in 2006, with amendments made in 2011. Ensuring the safety and protection of journalists and press freedom has been a longstanding challenge for the DRC. However, recent constitutional revisions have aimed to safeguard freedom of expression and the right to information. Article 23 grants individuals the freedom to express themselves through speech, print, and images, provided it adheres to the law and public morals. Article 24 focuses on the right to information, allowing the press to broadcast via radio and television within legal and moral boundaries.

In March 2023, the DRC introduced Ordinance Law 23/009, impacting Articles 23 and 24 of the constitution. This law replaced the stringent 1996 ordinance that severely restricted press freedom and expression. However, the new laws carry harsh penalties for disseminating false information, particularly targeting figures in authority, potentially empowering authorities rather than protecting journalists.

Media coverage in the DRC often prioritizes current political affairs over economic, social, and developmental news. Many outlets and organizations exhibit bias towards certain political candidates, and corruption remains a prevalent issue.

== Freedom of speech and the press ==
While the constitution provides for freedom of speech and the press, the government has restricted this right in practice. Arrests, murders and other harassment of journalists is frequently reported.

In 2009, Reporters Without Borders ranked the Democratic Republic of the Congo 146th out of 175 countries in its yearly global press freedom ranking. By 2023, the DRC was ranked 124th in the Reporters Without Borders press freedom index.

There are several organizations monitoring freedom of the press in the Democratic Republic of the Congo:

- Union nationale de la presse congolaise
- Journaliste en danger

=== "Coupage" ===
Many journalists in the Democratic Republic of the Congo are subjected to the practise of coupage (in English: cutting), where journalists are paid to write articles on behalf of persons who are the article's actual subject. Press independence remains stifled. There are two significant impacts from this practice:

- it affects the principle of remuneration of some journalists, enabling the Congolese print media to make it difficult for journalists to earn a living from legitimate journalism alone;
- it makes it easier to bribe the press, as much for partisan articles as for articles containing generally neutral information.

=== Haute Autorité des Médias and CSAC ===
The High Media Authority (Haute Autorité des Médias; HAM) was formed as part of the Global and Inclusive Agreement on Transition in the Democratic Republic of Congo. It was also included in the Transitional Constitution, which came into effect on 4 April 2003. Its main goal was to keep the Congolese media neutral and encourage responsible reporting. It also worked to prevent hate speech and calls for violence, especially those linked to ethnic differences.

The first president of the HAM was Modeste Mutinga of the Forces Vives. Esdras Kambale Baekwa of the Rassemblement Congolais pour la Démocratie–Kisangani Mouvement de la Libération (RCD/K-ML) served as the 1st Vice-President. Dominique Sakombi Inongo, a former government official, was the 2nd Vice-President, while Jean-Pierre Lola Kisanga of the Rassemblement Congolais pour la Démocratie (RCD) served as the 3rd Vice-President. Imana Ingulu of the Mouvement de Libération du Congo (MLC) was the rapporteur, Buhunga Kashoky of the Mai-Mai was the 1st deputy rapporteur, and the 2nd deputy rapporteur represented the political opposition. Pascal Himpay of RCD-National (RCD/N) served as the 3rd deputy rapporteur.

The HAM faces challenges in asserting its regulatory authority across the Congo. It remained in place until 10 January 2011, when it was replaced by the Conseil Supérieur de l'Audiovisuel et de la Communication (CSAC). The CSAC then became the country's only independent media regulator.

== Print ==
There are currently 540 newspapers in the country. Major newspapers are only nominally privately owned. Journalists must be members of the state-controlled union to practise their profession. The press today is firmly under MPR control. The largest dailies were Elima, Courrier d'Afrique, and Salongo (fr) (10,000).

The majority of print press publications are in French, an official language of the country. Despite their ambitions of national news coverage, it is difficult for these publications to attain broad coverage, both due to challenges in gathering information, and in physically distributing the publications. Many journalists are therefore tied to a city or a region, essentially Kinshasa.

Several daily newspapers are published, of which the majority have a pro-government bias. Some newspapers are published irregularly.

=== Print publications ===
Daily publications

Name	Circulation
Alerte Plus	?
L'Avenir (RDC)	3,000
Demain le Congo	?
Elima (RDC)	1,000
L'Éveil (RDC)	1,000
Forum des As	?
Le Messager Africain	?
L'Observateur	?
Le Palmarès (RDC)	1,000
Le Phare (RDC)	2,500
Le Potentiel	2,500
La Prospérité	?
La Référence Plus (RDC)	5,000
La République (Congo-Kinshasa)	?
Le Soft international	?
La Tempête des tropiques	?
UHURU	550
Journal Congopress	?

Bi-Weekly publications

Name	Circulation
La Cité africaine (RDC)	1,000
La Manchette	?
Le Climat Tempéré (RDC)	1,200
Le Révélateur	1,000
Salongo	1,000
Journal Congopress	1,000

Weekly publications

Name	Circulation
L'Alerte	?
Le Collimateur	?
La Conscience	?
L'Éveil (RDC)	?
La Flamme du Congo	?
La Libre Afrique	?
Kin Telegraph	?
Mukuba	?
Le Peuple	?
Umoja	?

== Telecommunications ==
The postal, telephone, and telegraph services are owned and operated by the government. In 2002 there were an estimated 10,000 mainline phones in use nationwide. In 2003 there were an estimated 19 cell phones in use for every 1,000 people. State-controlled radio and television transmissions, operated under Radio-Television Nationale Congolaise (RTNC), are the prominent broadcasting stations, reaching the largest number of citizens. The RTNC radio broadcast of La Voix du Congo, is available in French, Swahili, Lingala, Tshiluba, and Kikongo. There are also many privately run broadcasting stations. In 2001, there were 3 AM and 11 FM radio stations and 4 television stations. In 2003, there were an estimated 385 radios and 2 television sets for every 1,000 people.

=== Television ===
Since 1990 many television stations have been broadcasting in the Democratic Republic of the Congo. In 2006, 58 television channels were available. Of these, 38 are in Kinshasa.

==== Television stations ====
List of television stations
- Action Missionnaire d'Évangélisation des nations TV
- Africa TV
- Antenne A, à Kinshasa
- Canal Congo Télévision (CC TV)
- Canal Kin Télévision (CKTV)
- Canal Tropical Télévision (Tropicana TV)
- Congo Education Broadcasting System (CEBS)
- Couleurs Télévision
- Congo Web TV
- CMB TV
- Musique Various & Le T.P. O.K. Jazz
- Digital Congo TV
- MISHAPI VOICE TV
- EMMANUEL TV
- HOPE CHANEL
- UB FM
- MUTETEZI TV
- GKV Network Television (GKV) in Mbanza-Ngungu, Lower Congo
- Global TV
- Horizon 33
- Mirador TV
- Numerica
- Nyota TV, in Lubumbashi, Katanga
- Nzondo TV
- Planète TV
- Radio Télé Puissance (RTP)
- Radio Télévision Armée de l'Éternel
- Radio Télévision de la Voix de l'Aigle
- Radio Télévision Dieu Vivant (RTDV)
- Radio Television Groupe Avenir (RTG@)
- Radio-Télévision Kasangulu (RTKAS), in Kasangulu, Bas-Congo
- Radio Télévision Kimbanguiste
- Radio Télévision Kintuadi
- Radio Télévision Wantanshi (RTW)
- Radio Télévision Message de Vie (RTMV)
- Radio-Télévision nationale congolaise (RTNC) : RTNC1, RTNC2, RTNC3, RTNC4, RTNC Bandundu, etc.
- Radio Télévision Nyota (RTN)
- Radio Télévision Sango Malamu
- Radio Télévision Sentinelle
- Raga TV, Raga+
- Solar Energy
- Télévision Kin Malebo
- Télé France Kinshasa : www.tfktv.com
- Radio Télé Mwangaza in Lubumbashi, Katanga

=== Radio and radio stations ===
According to Congolese author and information and communication sciences researcher Patrick De Favre Bintene, the Congolese radio sector comprises more than 400 private stations and two public ones. The transitional Constitution installed an entity called the Higher Council for Audiovisual and Communication (Conseil Supérieur de l'Audiovisuel et de la Communication; CSAC), which oversees media activity, including radio broadcasting.

Radio Télévision Nationale Congolaise (RTNC) is a public broadcaster established under a 1981 ordinance-law, which mandated it to provide public radio and television services and to inform, train, and educate the population. Based on a highly centralized approach, public media at the time primarily communicated government positions to the population. Radio and television news reportedly began each day with an editorial praising the president. RTNC operates two television channels. RTNC 1 is a national news and information channel, while RTNC 2, established in 1996 from the former RATELESCO (Radio Télévision Scolaire), focuses on entertainment and broadcasts only in Kinshasa. RTNC also operates ten provincial stations. Although these stations have financial autonomy, Kinshasa funds staff salaries. The network maintains a central newsroom in Kinshasa and production and broadcasting stations in each provincial capital. It broadcasts in five languages: French, Kikongo, Swahili, Tshiluba, and Lingala. For radio, RTNC operates two frequencies in Kinshasa, carrying the national radio service and the local FM service (RTN).

Private radio stations provide alternatives to RTNC, particularly by giving citizens opportunities to express their views on current events. The private radio in the DRC includes non-commercial community, associative, academic, and school radio stations; religious stations, mainly evangelical or messianic stations affiliated with Pentecostal/Revival churches; and private commercial stations. It also includes Radio Okapi, operated by MONUSCO. International stations such as Radio France Internationale (RFI), Africa Radio, the BBC, and RTBF also broadcast on FM, with the latter three available on FM only in Kinshasa. Most private commercial stations are concentrated in Kinshasa and provincial capitals such as Lubumbashi, Mbuji-Mayi, and Kananga. Religious stations are particularly numerous in Kinshasa and are often affiliated with Revival churches and owned by pastors or preachers. Some Protestant, Kimbanguist, Islamic, and Revival church stations are well equipped and exert considerable influence on public opinion and society in the DRC.

Two religious radio stations were among the early actors in Kinshasa's radio sector: Radio Elikya, a Catholic station established in 1995 and owned by the Archdiocese of Kinshasa, and Radio Sango Malamu, a Protestant station established in 2000. Both extend their programming beyond evangelization to address education and civic issues. Some Catholic provincial stations, such as Radio Télévision Amani in Kisangani, operating since 1995, and Radio Maria in Bukavu, established in 2001, have adopted a similar approach. Catholic, Protestant, and Kimbanguist media networks encourage their stations to address issues beyond religious matters, including citizenship and development. This role is particularly important in areas where religious stations are the only local sources of radio information.

Most of these radio stations employ volunteers from their respective churches. Although religious radio stations are expected to remain apolitical, several became involved in the 2006 electoral campaign, supporting certain candidates. These stations also provide an alternative to national media outlets by supplying locally relevant information. A report by the French Ministry of Foreign Affairs notes that the main contribution of provincial radio stations is their ability to extend access to information in remote parts of the country and establish themselves as partners in economic and social development.

Lists of radio stations

Public stations

- RTNC, national radio with regional broadcasts

Humanitarian stations

- Radio Okapi, national coverage with regional broadcasts

Community stations

- Radio Réveil FM, in Kinshasa and Radio Reveil Afrika in Lubumbashi
- Radio Communautaire de Muanda (RCM), in Muanda
- Radio Communautaire de Mbanza Ngungu (Radio NTEMO), in Mbanza Ngungu
- Radio Evangélique de Muanda (RTEM), in Muanda
- Radio Télé Boma (RTB), in Boma
- Radio Osase, in Tshumbe (Kasai)
- Radio Bangu (rb) in Kimpese
- Radio Ntomotosono in Luozi
- Radio Adri à Madimba
- Radio Maendeleo in Bukavu
- Radio Bubusa FM in Mugogo/ Walungu

Private stations

- Canal Futur, in Kinshasa
- Concorde FM, in Kasai
- Digital Congo FM, in Kinshasa
- GKV Network Television (GKV) in the process of being installed in Mbanza-Ngungu
- La Voix du Peuple, in Bunia
- Radio Bukavu, in Bukavu
- Radio Kisangani, in Kisangani
- Radio Malebo Broadcast Channel (MBC), in Kinshasa
- Radio Mbuji-Mayi, in Mbuji-Mayi
- Radio Mwangaza, in Lubumbashi
- Radio Liberté Kinshasa, in Kinshasa
- Radio Lubumbashi, in Lubumbashi
- Radio Télé Groupe L'Avenir (RTGA), in Kinshasa
- Radio Télévision Catholique Elikya (RTCE)
- Radio-Télévision Kasangulu (RTKAS), in Kasangulu
- Radio Télé Kin Malebo (RTKM), in Kinshasa
- Radio Télé Nyota, in Lubumbashi
- Raga FM, in Kinshasa
- Top Congo FM, in Kinshasa
- Radio Télé Matadi (RTM) in Matadi
- Radio Télé Kisantu (RTKIS) in Kisantu
- RadioTélé Débout Ksai (RTDK) in Mbujimayi
- Radio télé Kasai Horison (KHrt) in Mbujimayi

Religious stations

- Elikya, à Kinshasa
- Radio Canal CVV ("Le Chemin, la Vérité et la Vie"), in Kinshasa
- Radio ECC, in Kinshasa
- Radio Kintuadi, in Kinshasa and in Lower Congo, in Matadi, Boma, Mbanza Ngungu
- Radio Kahuzi, in Bukavu
- Radio Lumière, in Kinshasa
- Radio Méthodiste Lokole, in Kinshasa
- Radio Parole Éternelle, in Kinshasa
- Radio Sango Malamu, in Boma, Kikwit and Kinshasa
- Radio Sentinelle, in Kinshasa
- Radio Sumbula, in Kinshasa
- Radio Télé Armée de l'Éternel, in Kinshasa
- Radio Télé Message de Vie, in Kinshasa
- Radio Télé Puissance, in Kinshasa
- Radio Télévision Dieu Vivant, in Kinshasa
- Radio Télévision Kimbanguiste (RATELKI), in Kinshasa
- Radio Universelle, in Kinshasa
- Radio Vuvu Kieto in Mbanza Ngungu
- Radio Tomisa in Kikwit
- Radio Sango Malamu in Kikwit
- Radio Télévision du Diocèse d'Idiofa (RTDI) in Idiofa
- Radio Embam in Idiofa
- Radio Boboto in Isiro
- Radio Moto in Butembo, Beni, and Oicha
- Radio Sauti Ya Injili in Goma
- Radio Sauti Ya Rehema in Bukavu
- Radio Neno la Uzima in Bukavu
- Radio Mwinda (of the Diocese of Mbandaka-Bikoro)
- Radio Canal de Vie in Lubumbashi
- Radio Hosanna in Lubumbashi
- Radio Télé Inter Viens et Vois (RTIV) in Lubumbashi
- Radio Télé Inter Viens et Vois (RTIV) in Kisangani
- Radio Tangazeni Kristu (RTK) in Kisangani
- Radio Télévision d'Évangélisation et de Développement Intégral (RTEDI) in Kisangani
- Radio Télévision Pêcheur d'Hommes (RTPH) in Kisangani
- Radio Télé Mont Carmel, in Mbujimayi
- Radio Télé Sentinnelle, in Mbujimayi
- Radio Télévision EELDA, in Mbujimayi
- Radio Télévision Bwena Muntu, in Mbujimayi

== International ==
International broadcasting entities from countries like Britain, France, and Switzerland operate in the DRC, but challenges such as censorship and language barriers limit their reach beyond major cities. Broadcasting stations like the BBC, RFI, and Fondation Hirondelle are accessible via radio in many urban cities.

Broadcasting Stations:

- BBC
- RFI
- Fondation Hirondelle
- Radio Okapi

== See also ==
- Telecommunications in the Democratic Republic of the Congo
- Democratic Republic of the Congo literature
- Democratic Republic of the Congo comics
- Cinema of the Democratic Republic of the Congo

== Bibliography ==
- "Democratic Republic of the Congo: Directory: the Press". Africa South of the Sahara 2004. Regional Surveys of the World. Europa Publications. 2004. p. 300+. ISBN 1857431839.
- Jonathon Green; Nicholas J. Karolides (2005). "Democratic Republic of Congo". Encyclopedia of Censorship. Facts on File, Inc. ISBN 978-1-4381-1001-1.
- "Democratic Republic of Congo", Freedom of the Press, USA: Freedom House, 2016, OCLC 575093614.
