= Coupage =

Congolese media colloquial term

Coupage is a colloquial term used in the journalism of the Democratic Republic of the Congo to describe the practice of giving money or other benefits to journalists by organizers of events they cover. The payment, often presented as a gratuity or "envelope", are typically intended to motivate journalists to report on the event, sometimes in a positive or supportive way. The practice is widely criticized as a form of media corruption because it may compromise the independence and neutrality of reporting.

Coupage has become a widely recognized feature of the Congolese media and has spread across different parts of the country, where it may also be designated by various local terms.

== Etymology ==
The word coupage derives from the French verb couper, meaning "to cut". In a literal sense, the term can refer to the act of cutting or slicing, but it can also denote the mixing of a weaker liquor with another diluted beverage and, by extension, the adulteration of a liquid product with a substance of lower value. In Congolese journalistic slang, however, the term has acquired a figurative meaning related to financial inducements given to journalists.

== Origins ==
The origin of coupage is commonly linked to the development of the press in the Democratic Republic of the Congo after independence in 1960. The term is associated with François Kupa Madugala, a Congolese politician who served as Secretary of State for Finance in the government of Cyrille Adoula and later as governor of several provinces. According to journalistic accounts, the expression appeared in 1964, when Kupa reportedly gave a significant sum of money to journalists after granting them an interview. The reporters were said to have been so surprised by the amount that they returned to their newsroom without their Nagra recorders, which they had left in his office. Their colleagues jokingly remarked that Kupa had "cut" them (les avait coupés), which led to the creation of the word kupage that was later adapted into the more French-styled spelling coupage.

Other accounts link the popularization of the practice to the Second Republic under Mobutu Sese Seko, when the phenomenon became more widespread within the media sector.

== Types of coupage ==
In his study Le coupage: Une pratique d'allocation des ressources dans le contexte médiatique congolais, Rigobert Lapess Munkeni distinguishes four forms of coupage based on the behavior of the actors involved in the practice within the media field.

Type of coupage	Description
Occasional coupage	Refers to the opportunity for receiving a reward that a journalist encounters by chance during a report or while covering events that occur in the normal course of work. It refers to a form of payment that is itself unusual, since the "occasional" aspect here may be either improvised or provoked, and therefore more or less arranged for the benefit of either the journalist receiving it or the person offering it.
Circumstantial coupage	Occurs when a journalist covers an event at the explicit invitation of a source of information who requests the presence of one or more media professionals. In such cases, the payment corresponds to the circumstances of the event and is generally favorable to the journalist, particularly since the journalist did not solicit compensation from the source who requested the coverage.
Ratified coupage (coupage ratifié)	Concerns journalists or media organizations that are widely recognized by professional communities or information sources as influential and necessary interlocutors. This category often involves prominent journalists, television channels with large audiences, or radio and television reporters who reach broader publics than those working in the written press. Within this type, a distinction is sometimes made between the "notoriously cut" journalist, whose reputation for receiving such payments is well known, and the accredited journalist who has been formally invited to cover the event.
Proximity coupage (coupage proximité)	Happens when a source of information maintains close personal ties with a journalist or a media organization, which creates a "relationship resembling complicity". In this case, the practice develops from relational closeness, which Munkeni describes through the idea of "proximization", referring to the emotional, sentimental, and subjective factors shaping this type of exchange. According to Munkeni's analysis, the second category, circumstantial coupage, appears closest to the concept of ordinary media coverage and is not necessarily considered a professional misconduct in itself.

== Regional variations ==
=== Kinshasa ===
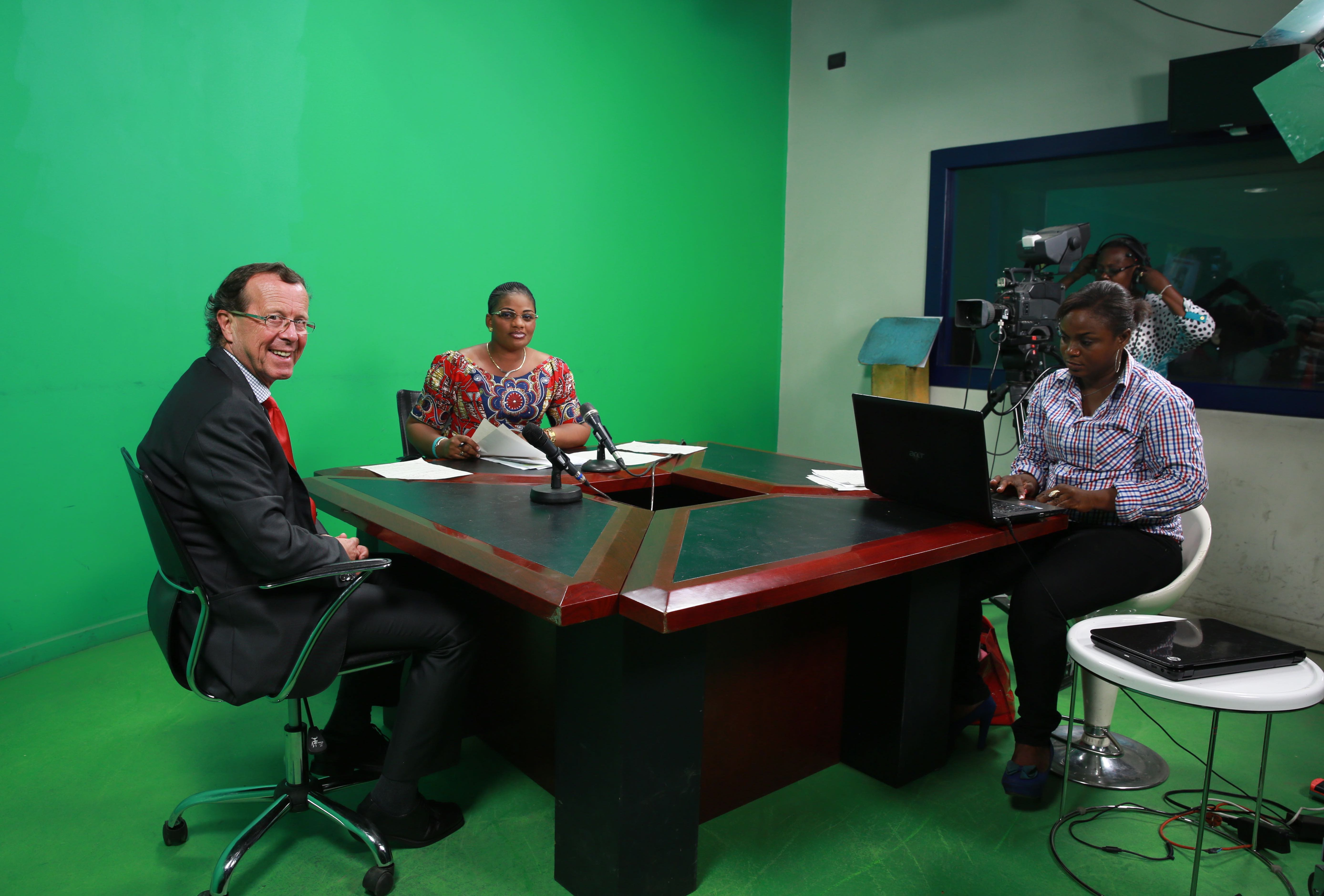
Martin Kobler, Special Representative of the UN Secretary-General and head of MONUSCO, in the studio of the Radio-Télévision nationale congolaise (RTNC) in Kinshasa

In Kinshasa, coupage is commonly referred to as mot de la fin ("the final word"). The phrase reportedly appeared among journalists in the capital after a press conference held in the Brel Hall of the Wallonia-Brussels Cultural Centre by Colette Braeckman, a journalist from the Belgian newspaper Le Soir, on editorial planning for media coverage of an electoral campaign and the rules of journalistic ethics and professional conduct. When the conference ended, many journalists remained in the hall and nearby corridors, waiting for the customary "transport money", a small sum traditionally given to reporters after press events. Observers noted that journalists often stayed long after events had finished, not to obtain additional information but in anticipation of receiving this compensation.

During the event, several journalists kept their attention focused on an organizer who had sent invitations to the newsrooms and who was expected to distribute the money. When she quietly left the venue without giving instructions such as "Journalists, follow me", confusion spread among the reporters. Some of them contacted another journalist who had accompanied her to find out whether the payment had been planned. The answer disappointed them, as no envelopes had been prepared since the press conference had been organized by a fellow journalist rather than by a political or institutional sponsor. In this context, the phrase "mot de la fin" gradually became associated with the expectation of a concluding payment after press events, and the practice has become widespread in the city's media circles.

=== Mbuji-Mayi ===
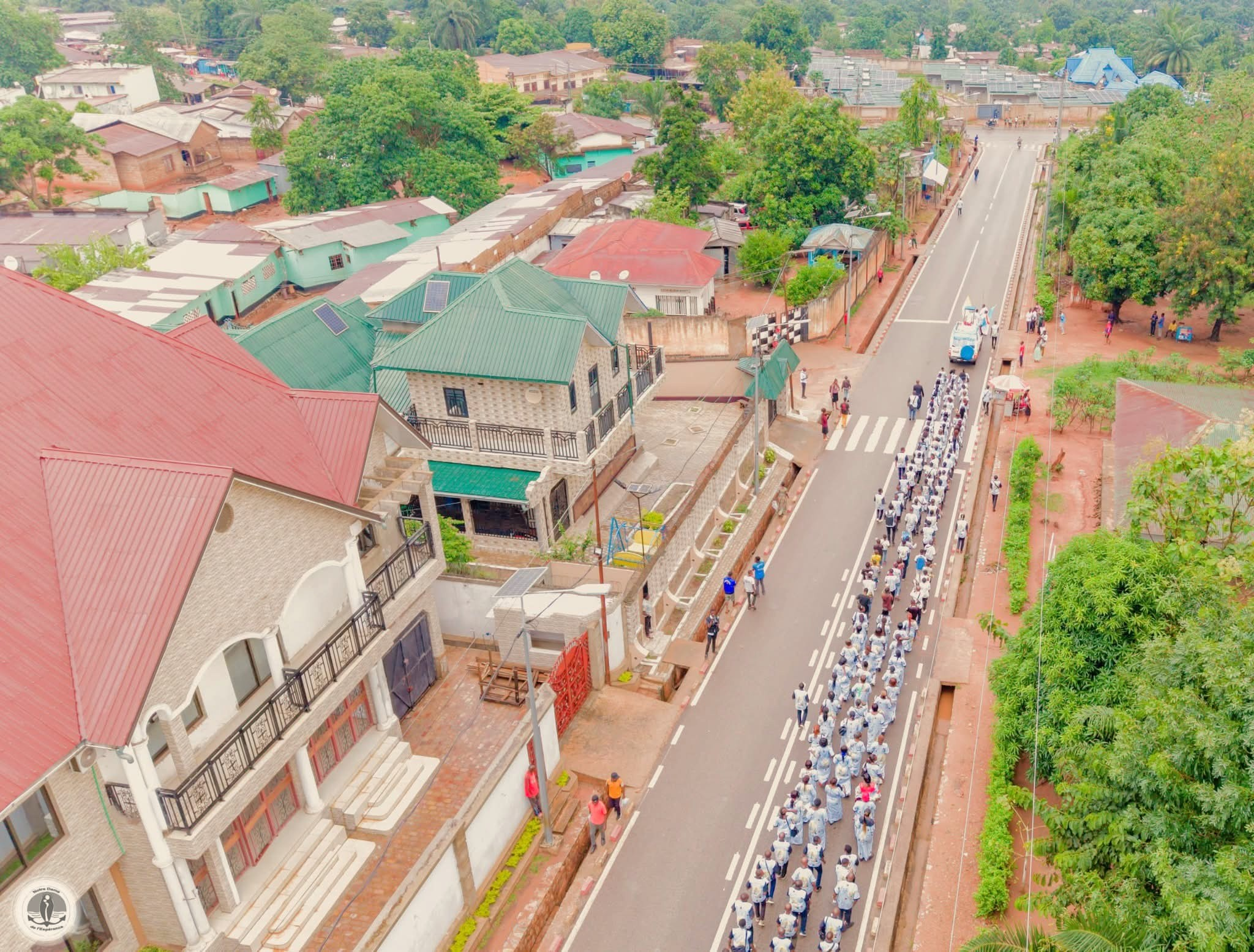
Street view of Mbuji-Mayi

In Mbuji-Mayi, journalists often request their "collation" (refreshment allowance), referred to as molangi wa mala (meaning "a bottle of beer" in the Tshiluba language), or their "transport" allowance, known as katuba (which refers to a taxi), to refer to coupage.

=== South Kivu ===
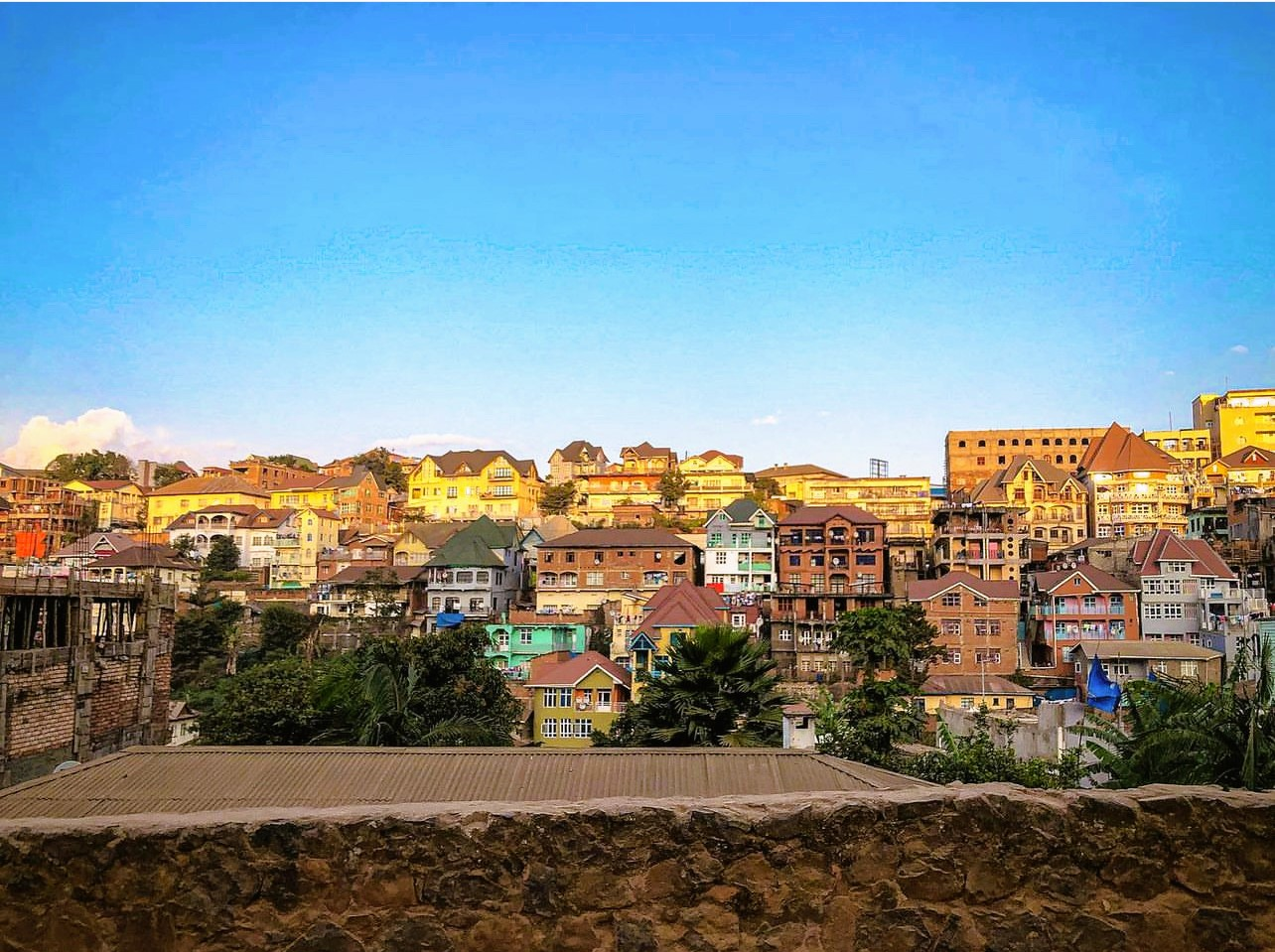
View of Bukavu

In South Kivu, particularly in the provincial capital Bukavu, coupage is commonly referred to by expressions such as "transport", "mot de la fin", or "sauvetage" (literally "rescue"), which reflects the idea that the payment helps journalists meet daily expenses. A group of reporters in Bukavu has become known informally as "rapid-response journalists", who often move from one event to another in search of coupage, sometimes without being formally attached to a media organization and without ultimately publishing or broadcasting the reports they collect. Some present themselves as correspondents for newspapers based in Kinshasa or abroad to gain access to press events. Well-informed about upcoming activities, they typically arrive early to sign attendance lists and then wait for the moment when payments or refreshments are distributed.

=== Haut-Katanga ===
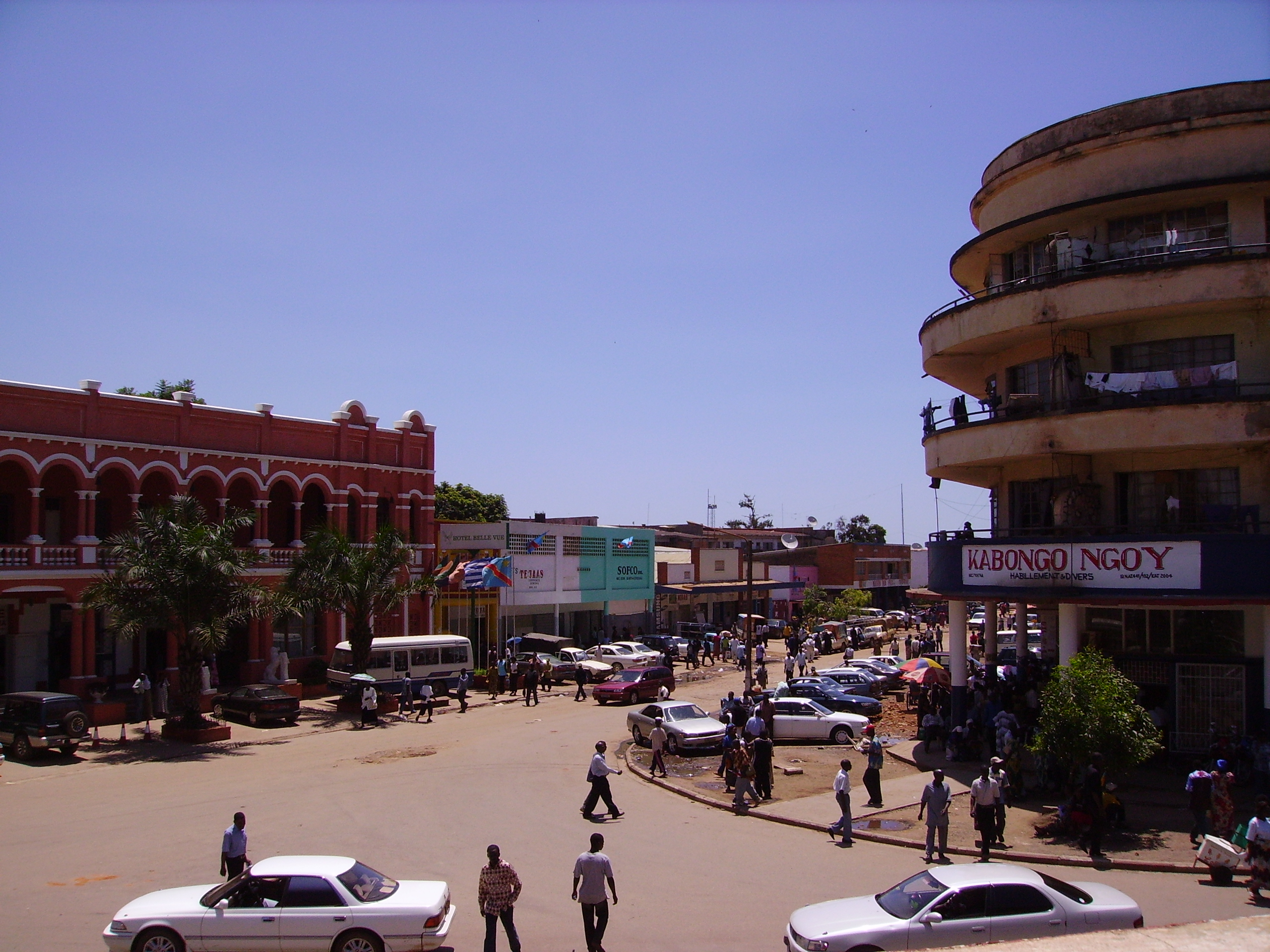
Downtown Lubumbashi

In the province of Haut-Katanga, the term Kawama is used to refer to coupage. The term derives from the name of a village located about 12 kilometers from Lubumbashi, the provincial capital since the administrative division of the former Katanga province into four provinces. According to accounts shared among local journalists, the expression started with a Lubumbashi-based journalist named Jean-Pierre Senga Lukavu, who regularly traveled to the village in his pickup truck to transport charcoal produced by villagers and then sell it in the city to earn extra money alongside his journalism work. When colleagues asked where he was going, he reportedly answered, "I'm going to get my Kawama", and the expression subsequently became integrated into the vocabulary of journalists in Lubumbashi and, more broadly, throughout Haut-Katanga to refer to coupage, as journalists often ask, "Will there be a Kawama?" whenever a press briefing is announced in the city.

=== Beni ===
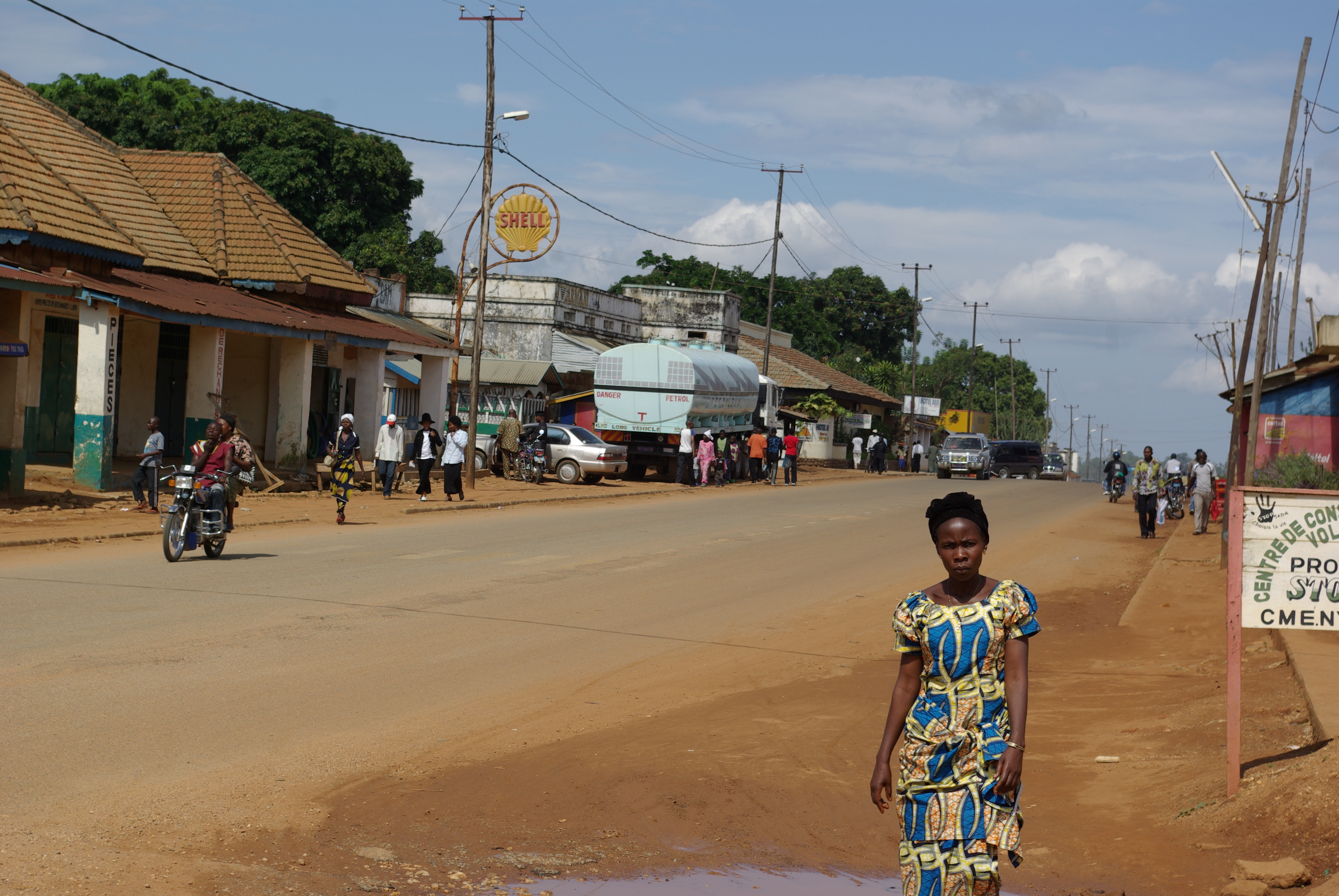
National Road 2 in Beni

Although expressions such as mot de la fin and "transport" are also used in Beni, the term that seems more specific to the locality is Kamboka. In the Swahili spoken in Beni, this word literally means "children's sauce" or "children's food", and it is used metaphorically to describe the practice of coupage.

=== Matadi ===
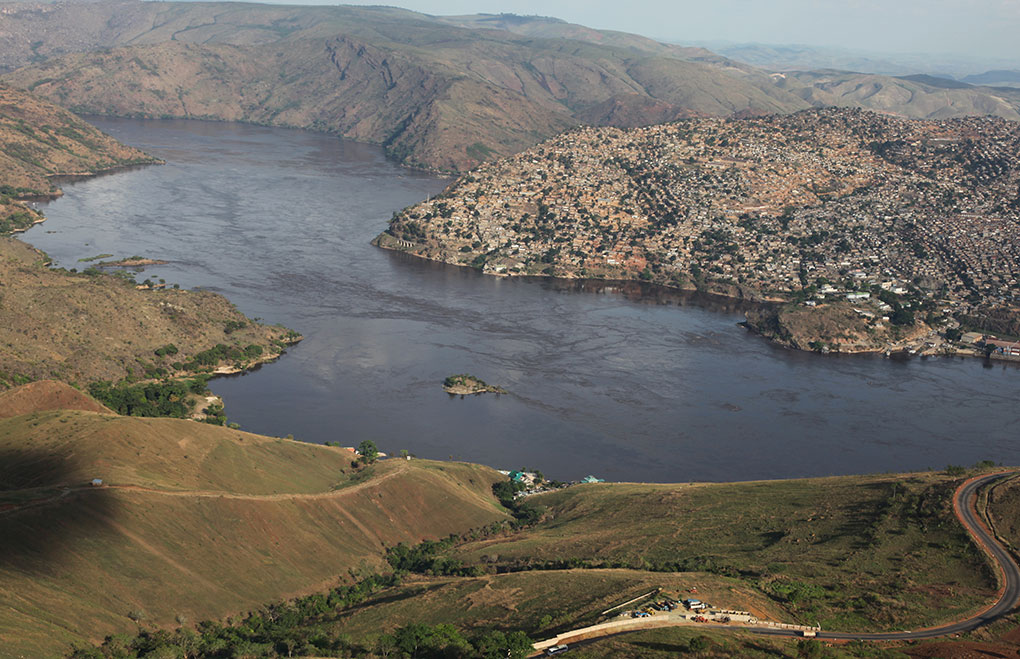
View over Matadi

In Matadi, journalists covering events often receive envelopes containing small sums of money from organizers, usually described as "transport" expenses. Competition for these payments has sometimes led to tensions, deception, and conflicts among reporters, as exemplified by one of the most often cited anecdotes from 1983 following a reporting trip to the Inga hydroelectric dam upstream from Matadi. A group of journalists had been invited by the Minister of Information at the time, Ekila Liyonda, and received an envelope of coupage. The money was entrusted to a journalist from RTNC-Matadi, with the understanding that it would be divided among the group upon their return to the city. According to accounts from veteran journalists, the reporter later claimed that the money had been lost. Suspicious colleagues searched his bag but found nothing. They then forcibly searched him and discovered several banknotes hidden in his clothing, revealing that the funds had been concealed. The incident reportedly ended in anger and ridicule directed at the journalist who had attempted to keep the money for himself.

=== Other African countries ===
Comparable expressions also exist in other African countries. In Gabon, the practice is known as gombo, while in Rwanda journalists who accept such payments may be described as taking a "free lunch". In Madagascar, a similar expression translates roughly as "give me your slap".

== Financial incentives and ethical challenges ==
Some journalists regard coupage payments as a way to offset low or irregular incomes, and these payments can also provide additional, though unpredictable, financial support for media organizations such as radio stations, television channels, and newspapers. As a result, journalists may seek these payments from political leaders, provincial authorities, mining industry executives, and sports administrators. Some officials even provide bonuses to journalists accredited to their offices, which treats them as informal press attachés. Coupage is also partly linked to the limited assistance provided to the media sector by the Conseil Supérieur de l'Audiovisuel et de la Communication (CSAC) as well as professional organizations like the National Union of the Congolese Press (Union nationale de la presse congolaise; UNPC) and the Congolese Media Observatory (Observatoire des Médias Congolais; OMEC). Modeste Mutinga Mutuishayi, former CSAC president, recalled feeling embarrassed when he accepted such a payment early in his career and noted that during President Joseph Kabila's term, economic collapse and the near absence of advertising revenue left media professionals reliant on coupage. Colette Tshomba Ntundu, former RTNC journalist and owner of Uhuru and the women's magazine Awa, admitted receiving coupage during her career. She proposed that media workers should have an official agreement covering reporting expenses, which, if shared between journalists and media outlets, should not be considered corruption nor influence content.

A journalist working for a weekly publication in Lubumbashi reported receiving a monthly bonus of approximately $50, an arrangement reportedly known to his editor-in-chief, who is said to receive a portion of the payment. At press conferences held at the Lubumbashi's governor's office, journalists may receive around 15,000 Congolese francs (roughly $35), sometimes accompanied by a meal. The practice also includes advertorial journalism promoting political actors or institutions, with favorable coverage of provincial authorities reportedly costing around 80,000 Congolese francs (about $186) per page. In some cases, political figures request positive media coverage and even suggest the wording of statements to be broadcast or published. Journalists themselves may sometimes organize press briefings to obtain such payments, presenting them publicly as opportunities for political figures to respond to their critics.

Mining companies have likewise been identified as important sources of coupage. Some industrial firms maintain close relationships with local media outlets through advertorial agreements, financial assistance, or other benefits, which critics argue can discourage journalists from reporting critically on their operations. One frequently cited case involves Société Minière du Katanga (SOMIKA), which has been accused of polluting water sources that supply much of Lubumbashi. A press conference organized to respond to the allegations reportedly collapsed when journalists realized that no payments would be provided. The event was later renegotiated and rescheduled, with about 100 journalists invited and reportedly receiving $100 each along with paid advertorial coverage. In some instances, journalists negotiate payments for the publication or broadcast of their reports. Similar practices have been reported at Société minière de Bakwanga (MIBA), the state-owned diamond mining company, which sometimes invites selected media outlets to cover its events and may pay fees for the publication or broadcasting of reports or advertorials, while journalists receive their own allowances. Additional sources of coupage include sports officials, who may provide smaller sums, often between 1,000 and 5,000 Congolese francs, in exchange for mentions in newspapers or greetings broadcast on radio and television.

Conflicts over coupage are described as relatively common during reporting assignments. Disputes may arise when a journalist's name is omitted from the list of beneficiaries or when someone attempts to claim a larger share of the envelope intended for the entire group. Tensions may also occur when reporters who were not invited to an event appear, hoping to receive part of the payment. In some cases, journalists who leave empty-handed have threatened to boycott the event in their media coverage. Organizers of events requiring media coverage are generally aware of the practice and may prepare envelopes in advance for attending journalists. However, these payments are not always sufficient from the journalists' perspective, particularly because part of the money may be expected to be shared with newsroom supervisors to ensure that the report is published or broadcast. Over time, journalists in other cities like Matadi have developed different strategies to obtain additional payments beyond the basic "transport" envelope. One method involves requesting interviews after completing a report, which can create an opportunity to ask the source for additional financial "motivation", sometimes given as technical or broadcasting fees for radio and television teams. Print journalists may instead negotiate the price of the space an article will occupy, proposing an internal "house rate" and seeking direct payment rather than advertorial arrangements.

== Criticism ==
Critics argue that the practice represents a form of corruption that sabotages public trust in journalism and weakens the credibility of the media. There is also a lack of institutional or professional frameworks to create legal measures that could discourage or forbid the practice. At a 2006 seminar in Matadi on journalists' unionization, Stanis Nkundiye, Secretary-General of the Syndicat national des professionnels de la presse (SNPP), openly criticized the professional environment that encourages journalists to seek such payments and argued that poor working conditions and the lack of stable employment in the media sector have contributed to making journalism financially precarious, sometimes pushing practitioners toward practices that compromise professional ethics. Seminar participants, including media observers and journalists, warned that reliance on coupage could trap media workers in a cycle of economic vulnerability and editorial dependence. They called for stronger professional standards and improved working conditions to support a more independent and responsible press.

Jean-Pierre Senga Lukavu, whose experience inspired the term Kawama used in Haut-Katanga to designate coupage, later denounced the practice, describing it as a "shameful practice" that damages the credibility of journalists. Modeste Mutinga Mutuishayi, former head of the Haute Autorité des Médias (HAM, now the Conseil Supérieur de l'Audiovisuel et de la Communication), described coupage as "disgraceful", likening it to corruption and the selling of one's journalistic conscience.
