= Telecommunications in the Democratic Republic of the Congo =

Telecommunications in the Democratic Republic of the Congo include radio, television, fixed and mobile telephones, and the Internet.

== Radio and television ==
- Radio stations:
  - Two state-owned radio stations are supplemented by more than 100 private radio stations; transmissions of at least 2 international broadcasters are available (2007);
  - 27 stations (2005);
  - 13 stations: 3 AM, 11 FM, and 2 shortwave (2001);
  - 16 stations: 3 AM, 12 FM, and 1 shortwave (1999).
- Radios: 18.0 million (1997).
- Television stations:
  - One state-owned TV broadcast station with near national coverage; more than a dozen privately owned TV stations with two having near national coverage (2007);
  - 23 stations (2005);
  - 4 stations (2001);
  - 20 stations (1999).
- Television sets: 6.5 million (1997).

Radio is the dominant medium; a handful of stations, including state-run Radio-Télévision Nationale Congolaise (RTNC), broadcast across the country. The United Nations Mission (MONUSCO) and a Swiss-based NGO, Fondation Hirondelle, operate one of country's leading stations, Radio Okapi. The network employs mostly-Congolese staff and aims to bridge political divisions. Radio France Internationale (RFI), which is widely available on FM, is the most popular news station. The BBC broadcasts on FM in Kinshasa (92.7), Lubumbashi (92.0), Kisangani (92.0), Goma (93.3) and Bukavu (102.2).

=== Radio Okapi ===
Radio Okapi was first established in February 2002 by the United Nations Mission in the Democratic of Republic of Congo (MONUC). Radio Okapi provides news, music, and political information to all corners of the Democratic Republic of Congo. The major purpose behind Radio Okapi is to provide all DRC citizens with radio services regardless of political affiliation. The FM waves Radio Okapi provided were aimed to be free of hate speech. Most importantly, Radio Okapi caters to the various different ethnicities within the DRC. This is done through the broadcasting of content in 5 of major languages spoken in the DRC. These five languages are French, Lingala, Swahili, Tshiluba, and Kikongo.

== Political uses of media ==
=== Hate speech ===
Specific media platforms in the Democratic Republic of Congo have used its platforms for the dissemination of hate speech. Media in the DRC has propagated hatred and ethnic divisions by reinforcing nationalistic sentiments. Numerous media outlets are owned by presidential candidates and their supporters. This increases the probability that news will tend to favor the political base of these presidential candidates. These presidential candidates use their media platforms to attack political opponents which include ethnically charged hate speech. The result of such propaganda is evident in recent conflicts between ethnic groups, Hema and Lendu. The conflict was fueled by hate speech on media platforms. As a result, the conflict between these ethnic groups has transformed to one of the bloodiest conflicts in the Democratic Republic of Congo.

== Telephones ==
- Calling code: +243
- International call prefix: 00
- Main lines:
  - 58,200 lines in use, 161st in the world (2012);
  - 20,000 lines in use (2000);
  - 36,000 lines in use (1995).
- Mobile cellular:
  - 19.5 million lines, 52nd in the world (2012);
  - 2.6 million lines (2005);
  - 15,000 lines (2000);
  - 10,000 lines (1995).
- Telephone system: barely adequate wire and microwave radio relay service in and between urban areas; domestic satellite system with 14 earth stations; inadequate fixed line infrastructure, state-owned operator providing less than 1 fixed-line connection per 1000 persons; given the inadequate fixed-line infrastructure, the use of mobile-cellular services has surged and mobile teledensity is roughly 20 per 100 persons (2011).
- Satellite earth stations: 1 Intelsat (Atlantic Ocean) (2011).

== Internet ==
- Top-level domain: .cd (formerly .zr).
- Internet users:
  - 1.2 million users, 110th in the world; 1.7% of the population, 202nd in the world (2012); In 2023 22.9% of the population had Internet access, which is about 23 million people.
  - 290,000 users, 132nd in the world (2008);
  - 50,000 users (2002).
- Internet hosts: 2,515 hosts, 159th in the world (2012).
- IPv4: 21,248 addresses allocated, less than 0.05% of the world total, 0.3 addresses per 1000 people (2012).
- Internet service providers: 188 ISPs (2005); 1 ISP (1999).

=== Internet cables ===
- List of terrestrial fibre optic cable projects in Africa
- West Africa Cable System (WACS), a fibre optic submarine communications cable linking countries along the west coast of Africa with the United Kingdom, was connected in early 2013.

== Internet censorship and surveillance ==
After the First Congo War (1996–1997) and Second Congo War (1998–2003), the nation transitioned to a renewed national unity under the rule of President Joseph Kabila and 4 vice presidents, all from former rebel and political opposition groups. The establishment of a democratic model required checks on corruption in public finance and natural resources, executive political parties, and hyperlocal militias and bandits. Peace agreements, in turn, did not end state violence, hence the need for absolute clarity to the public. The right to report on hostile resolutions was adopted in a 2002 resolution as a part of the eventual Inter-Congolese Dialogue. This accord declared that “independent, free, responsible and efficient media are a guarantee for public freedoms, the smooth running of democracy and social cohesion”, giving the voters direct insight into public figures, programs, and overall transparency. Article 27, 28, and Clause 29 established individual freedom of expression, moral press freedom, and the public right to information, respectively. During the time of continuing 2002 conflict, radios served as stages for peace songs and “come-home” messaging. Hosts had conversations with military and government officials, army members, and rebels to discuss the challenges of peace talks and demobilization. Censorship was lenient as long as radio personnel covered both sides.

Major exceptions to the right of free press imminently ensued. In 1996, censorship had begun to target Congo's artistic freedoms. Beyond broadcasts and news, the nation began to censor those who expressed political sentiments through music. The National Censorship Commission banned six songs that mentioned common opposition outcries relating to employment opportunities, civilian killings, corruption, and faltering human rights. If these songs are played on the radio, the artists may be fined up to $500 per song in accordance with a 1996 censorship decree. Freedom of the press was restricted for artists offending political elites or speaking against Congolese leaders and parties. For those using telecommunications as an outlet, interference was backed by such legislation. Open discussion about political corruption or unmentioned events, such as riots or uprisings against the ruling party, are avoided in news media but continuously active on pavement radio.

== Intentional shutdowns ==
The Congolese government performed a series of intentional internet shutdowns. The first was conducted in December 2011 and lasted approximately 25 days. During the 25 days, Short Message Service otherwise known as SMS was the only one affected by the shutdown. According to an article by CIPESA, "One of the reasons cited by the government for blocking communication was to prevent the spread of fake results over the internet before the electoral commission announced official results"

Unlike the first shutdown the second intentional shutdown had a broader range of impact.The second intentional shutdown occurred in January 2015. The Congolese government directed telecommunication companies within the country to halt all its services. Not only was SMS affected, but the entire internet itself. This action by the government came on the eve of political protest on a proposed electoral bill.

The most recent government shutdown occurred on December 19, 2016. This was an important date as President Joseph Kabila was supposed to step down as head of state. In order to quell, political upheaval the Congolese government ordered telecom operators to block social media in the country.

In September 2016, the government cut the signals of the Radio France Internationale (RFI) and United Nations Radio Okapi (UNRO). Later, the general and program director of the Radio-Télévision Manika de Kolwezi was arrested after intentionally broadcasting a phone interview with Katumbi, the opposition leader. The censorship of human freedoms of expression to information was condemned by the Congo's United Nations on Human Rights. Kabila was given until December 19, 2016, to step down. If he decided not to, precautionary measures were set to counter organization and public protests. The government ordered a temporary blocking of images, videos, and voiceovers on social networking sites such as Facebook, Twitter, Skype, and WhatsApp right after Kabila was to step down. Digital media was the central counter to government oversight and regulation seen in other telecommunication outlets. Media was used in lieu of radio broadcasting to avoid self-censorship, financial restraints that may affect networks, or news station shutdowns. Removing the intermediary for independent journalism and coverage prevented communication among those who wanted to organize and speak out against Kabila. Black-outs were utilized to prevent anticipated politically motivated violence. Additionally, the then Telecommunications Minister Thomas Luhaka was “not informed” of such interference by the government.

== See also ==
- Radio-Télévision Nationale Congolaise (RTNC), the state-run national broadcaster.
- Internet freedom in the Democratic Republic of the Congo.
- Media of the Democratic Republic of the Congo

== Images ==
Map of telecommunications in the Congo, 1955
