= François Kupa =

Congolese politician and businessman (1930–2002)

François Kupa Madugala

Secretary of State for Finance of the Democratic Republic of the Congo
- In office 2 August 1961 – 10 July 1964
- President: Joseph Kasa-Vubu
- Prime Minister: Cyrille Adoula

Personal details
- Born: François Kupa Madugala; 30 July 1982 (age 43) Tago, Haut-Uélé, Democratic Republic of the Congo
- Died: 2002
- Citizenship: Congolese

François Kupa Madugala (30 July 1930 – 2002) was a Congolese politician, administrator, and businessman who played a role in the early political history of the Democratic Republic of the Congo in the years following independence. He was Secretary of State for Finance in the government of Cyrille Adoula from 1961 to 1964 and later held several provincial leadership positions, including Governor of Uélé and Governor of Bandundu. Kupa is also associated with the origin of the journalistic term coupage, used in the Congolese media to describe payments given to journalists by event organizers.

== Early life, education, and political career ==
François Kupa Madugala was born on 30 July 1930 in Tago, a locality located in what is now Haut-Uélé province in the northeastern part of the Democratic Republic of the Congo. He initially pursued religious education and spent part of his early life in a seminary, before leaving ecclesiastical training to enter public service and politics.

He became a public figure during the early years of Congolese independence. In 1960, Kupa participated in the Belgo-Congolese Round Table Conference as a representative of the customary authorities of Orientale Province, which brought together Congolese leaders and Belgian officials to negotiate the country's transition to independence.

After independence, he joined the national government under Prime Minister Cyrille Adoula. Between 2 August 1961 and 10 July 1964, he was Secretary of State for Finance, a position in which he helped oversee the management of public finances during a period that was characterized by political unrest and internal conflicts. During his tenure, he issued a ministerial decree on 7 December 1962 ordering the reimbursement of salary advances that had been granted to magistrates and civil servants by the special commissioner of Équateur Province, ruling that the payments had been made illegally and ordering their repayment. After leaving the national office, Kupa continued his administrative career at the provincial level. He was the Governor of Uélé from 6 July 1965 to 20 December 1966, and later as Governor of Bandundu from 30 August 1967 to 9 August 1968.

== Association with the term "coupage" ==
François Kupa's name is associated with the origin of the term coupage, a colloquial expression used in Congolese journalism to describe payments or rewards given to journalists by event organizers whose activities they cover, which is also a practice often criticized as a form of corruption because it may compromise the neutrality of reporting. According to journalistic accounts, the term emerged in 1964 when Kupa, then Secretary of State for Finance, reportedly gave a significant sum of money to journalists after granting them an interview. The journalists were so surprised by the amount that they returned to their newsroom without their recording equipment, which they had left behind in his office. Their colleagues joked that Kupa had "cut" them (les avait coupés), which gave rise to the expression "kupage". Over time, the spelling evolved into coupage, a term that later became part of Congolese journalistic vocabulary. The practice has since influenced the handling of information in the media sector and has been cited as a factor weakening the independence of the press. According to Patrick Félix Abely, the phenomenon eventually spread across the national media and gave rise to various local expressions in different cities. In Lubumbashi, the practice is sometimes referred to as Kawama, a reference to a village about 12 kilometers from the city where a journalist, Jean-Pierre Senga Lukavu, used to collect sacks of charcoal that he sold to make ends meet. In Mbuji-Mayi, it is called Mulangi wa mala, meaning "a bottle of beer". In Bukavu, expressions such as transport, mot de la fin, and sauvetage are used, while in Goma similar practices are referred to as cachet, sombe ya batoto, makayabo, or maziwa. Similar terminology also exists elsewhere in Africa, as in Madagascar, journalists use the phrase "give me your slap", while in Gabon the term gombo is commonly used, and in Rwanda the expression free lunch, literally referring to someone who "eats everywhere", describes a journalist who accepts such payments.

== Business career ==
Kupa invested in real estate and founded a company known as APUK, through which he reportedly created employment opportunities and developed agricultural and commercial activities.

== Death and legacy ==
Kupa died in 2002. After his death, disputes reportedly materialized over the ownership of portions of his estate, particularly his real-estate holdings. Some reports mention attempts by various people to claim or contest control of his assets.

Kupa is regarded as one of the most influential historical figures of Haut-Uélé. The Kupa commune in the city of Isiro was named after him.
