= Groupe L'Avenir =

Congolese media conglomerate

- Type: Private
- Industry: Mass media
- Founded: 17 June 1993; 33 years ago
- Founder: Pius Muabilu Mbayu Mukala
- Headquarters: Gombe, Kinshasa, Democratic Republic of the Congo
- Area served: Democratic Republic of the Congo
- Key people: Pius Muabilu Mbayu Mukala (chairman and chief executive officer, until 2010); Christelle Muabilu (chief executive officer, 2010–present)
- Services: Newspaper publishing; Online news; Radio broadcasting; Television broadcasting
- Owner: Pius Muabilu Mbayu Mukala
- Website: groupelavenir-rdc.info

Groupe L'Avenir is a Congolese media conglomerate comprising a radio station, a television channel, a daily newspaper, and an online news outlet. Its headquarters are located in the Ruzizi Building at 873 Avenue du Bas-Congo in Gombe, Kinshasa. The group was founded by Pius Muabilu Mbayu Mukala, who served as its chairman and chief executive officer until he was succeeded by his daughter, Christelle Muabilu, in 2010.

== History ==
Groupe L'Avenir was founded as L'Avenir newspaper on 17 June 1993 by Pius Muabilu Mbayu Mukala, during a period of political uncertainty in Zaire. It emerged amid the crisis surrounding the democratic transition announced by President Mobutu Sese Seko on 24 April 1990. The Sovereign National Conference had been suspended, transitional institutions had been established, Prime Minister Étienne Tshisekedi had been dismissed, and Léon Kengo wa Dondo had succeeded him. According to media scholar and author Jean-Claude Muhindo Matabaro, these political developments contributed to the creation of several newspapers, including L'Avenir.

Initially published every Tuesday, L'Avenir consisted of eight pages divided into two sections. Its first offices were located on the tenth floor of the Interpol Building on Boulevard du 30 Juin in Kinshasa. The newspaper later moved to Seventh Street (7ème rue) in Limete, where it operated from the veranda of Muabilu's home. After publishing its 100th issue, it relocated to its present headquarters. In 1996, L'Avenir increased its publication schedule to twice a week, appearing on Tuesdays and Fridays. It later became a three-times-weekly newspaper, published on Mondays, Wednesdays, and Fridays.

In response to readers' requests for greater coverage of economic issues, its management launched a weekly publication titled La Bourse. In 1997, it introduced another weekly newspaper, Le Collimateur, which focused on investigative reporting and general analysis. Both publications later ceased circulation. The newspaper's operations gradually developed into a wider multimedia organization known as Groupe L'Avenir. Its television channel, Radio Télévision du Groupe L'Avenir (RTGA), began broadcasting on 1 March 1997. Following the outbreak of the Second Congo War in 1998, L'Avenir became a daily newspaper to meet the increased demand for regular news. The group later added a radio station, RTGA FM, which broadcasts in Kinshasa on 88.1 MHz. In November 1999, Groupe L'Avenir expanded into digital publishing by launching a subscription-based website. The website provided electronic editions of the group's publications and helped it reach readers beyond the printed newspaper.

In 2010, Christelle Muabilu succeeded her father as managing director of Groupe L'Avenir. In 2011, L'Avenir reduced its publication schedule from six to five issues per week because of declining weekend readership. During its early years, the newspaper did not own computers for typing and preparing documents. It therefore relied on outside service providers, including AMEKIN, a mechanical workshop based in Kinshasa. The newspaper later purchased its first Macintosh computer from AMEKIN. The computer has since been preserved as a historical item.

By 2011, Groupe L'Avenir employed approximately 270 people. That year, its printed newspaper reportedly had around 2,000 readers, which was also the approximate number of copies produced. Its online newspaper, by comparison, had approximately 30,000 users. Other reported figures indicated that the website received 30,000 visitors and had around 600,000 regular online followers, although Muhindo did not explain the reporting periods or the difference between these figures.

In 2013, Christelle Muabilu reorganized its media operations. She established a combined multimedia newsroom to improve coordination among the group's outlets. She also divided Groupe L'Avenir into five main departments: Administration and Finance, News Pool, Television Production and Programming, Radio Production and Programming, and Technical Services.

== Organization and operations ==
Groupe L'Avenir is headquartered in the Ruzizi Building at 873 Avenue du Bas-Congo in Gombe, Kinshasa. It has also maintained a representative office in Pretoria, South Africa. The group was founded by Pius Muabilu Mbayu Mukala, who served as its chairman and chief executive officer (CEO) until 2010. He was succeeded by his daughter, Christelle Muabilu, who has continued to serve as CEO. By 2011, Groupe L'Avenir reportedly employed approximately 270 people across its different media and business operations.

The group is divided into five main departments: Administration and Finance, News Pool, Television Production and Programming, Radio Production and Programming, and Technical Services. The News Pool provides reporting and editorial material for the group's different media outlets, while the production departments manage their respective radio and television programs. The Technical Services department supports broadcasting, printing, and related technical activities.

=== Media ===
The group publishes L'Avenir, a daily newspaper founded in Kinshasa on 17 June 1993. The newspaper is distributed in Kinshasa and several provinces of the Democratic Republic of the Congo. Published in tabloid format, it covers current affairs, economics, politics, society, culture, international news, entertainment, and sports. As of 2006, L'Avenir employed approximately 30 journalists. Its editorial staff included editor-in-chief Joachim Diana Gikupa, acting editorial director and sports director Denis Lubindi, proofreading editor J. Marcel Mbuyi, editor Ferdinand Katomakwisako, and editorial secretary Bomela Tondo Bo-Lisoma. Doudou Esungi Marthy coordinated the weekly L'Avenir Femme edition and contributed to the newspaper's "Health and Ecology" section with Anselme Nkinsi.

The group also operates the online news outlet L'Avenir.net and the printing company RTGA Printing. Its former publications include Le Collimateur, a weekly newspaper focused on investigative reporting and general analysis.

The group's broadcasting operations are carried out under Radio Télévision du Groupe L'Avenir (RTGA). Its commercial television channel began broadcasting on 1 March 1997. According to a 2006 profile, the television service was organized into programming, production, news, and technical departments. At that time, Serge Mulumba served as the division's managing director. In 2013, the word "World" was added to its name, and the channel became known as RTGA World. It currently broadcasts news, political, cultural, sports, and entertainment programs. Its radio station, RTGA FM, is a private general-interest station broadcasting in Kinshasa on 88.1 MHz.

=== Freight ===
As of 2006, Groupe L'Avenir operated freight businesses in the DRC and South Africa under the names RTGA Freight and RTGA Freight South Africa, respectively.

RTGA Freight worked in partnership with Wimbi Dira Airways, selling airline tickets and arranging cargo transportation within the DRC. The airline served several domestic destinations, including Gbadolite, Gemena, Isiro, Kalemie, Kananga, Kindu, Kisangani, Lubumbashi, Mbandaka, and Mbuji-Mayi. RTGA Freight South Africa was based in Pretoria and arranged passenger and cargo transportation through the same partnership. It also produced Quartier libre, a weekly television program featuring members of the Congolese community in South Africa.
