= Le Potentiel =

Le Potentiel is a Congolese daily newspaper based in Kinshasa, Democratic Republic of the Congo. It is part of the Media 7 press group, which also operates other media outlets, including Radio 7 and Télé 7. The newspaper was founded by Modeste Mutinga, a Congolese journalist and media proprietor who has been associated with the publication since its establishment. Le Potentiel has covered national politics, economics, social affairs, and major developments in the Democratic Republic of the Congo.

The paper criticized multiple DRC presidents, and Mutinga has been threatened, arrested, and jailed multiple times on charges related to his reporting. In 1992, during the Mobutu Sese Seko era, the offices of the newspaper were bombed. In 1998, Mutinga was arrested following an article covering the house arrest of the opposition leader Étienne Tshisekedi.

== See also ==
- Media of the Democratic Republic of the Congo
