= L'Avenir (Congolese newspaper) =

L'Avenir (French pronunciation: [lavniʁ], lit. 'The Future') is a daily newspaper published in Kinshasa in the Democratic Republic of the Congo. The company is part of the Groupe L'Avenir, a media group of the DRC. The content of the paper is primarily French, and includes content written in Lingala and Swahili. It was founded in 1996 as a weekly, and in 2006 became a daily paper, employing about 30 journalists.

The publisher of L'Avenir is Joachim Diana Gikupa and the editor-in-chief is Denis Lubindi.

== See also ==
- Radio Television Groupe Avenir
- Media of the Democratic Republic of the Congo
