= Social issues in the Democratic Republic of Congo =

The Democratic Republic of the Congo (DRC) is a country in central Africa.

== Poverty ==
The DRC has one of the highest incidences of poverty in the world. The DRC is #1 out of 11 top poor countries in the world (2014). At a rate of 71.34, its incidence of poverty is "extremely high", even in comparison with other central African countries. This poverty is not evenly distributed. The IMF estimates that poverty is more prevalent in rural areas (75.72%) than in urban areas (61.49%), while the provinces of Équateur, Bandundu and Sud-Kivu have a poverty incidence of over 85% compared to Kinshasa's 42%.

The DRC's high incidence of poverty is partly attributable to the ethnic conflict that spilled over from neighboring Rwanda and an ongoing civil war between government troops and rebel groups in Eastern Congo. The sustained levels of violence have caused massive infrastructural damage, internal displacement, and loss of property and lives. In 2007, the International Rescue Committee estimated that 5.4 million people had died from the war and that another 1,250 continue to die each day from war-related causes.

In order to reduce the levels of poverty in the country, the government embarked on IMF recommended reforms to improve its macroeconomic environment, initiate policies to support economic growth as well as improve its provision of basic social services. While the results have been mixed, the IMF notes in its 2010 report that Congo's economic governance has improved, over 22,000 km of roads have been completed and "significant progress" have been made in increasing primary school enrollment from 64.1% in 2004 to 84.3% in 2008 and reducing infant mortality.

== Sexual violence ==
Sexual violence has characterised much of the violence perpetuated in the DRC. Used as a tactic of war, the daily violations of women and children by armed groups have created a climate of fear and a reputation for the DRC as the world's "worst place to be a woman or a child". Women from ages "six to eighty" have become victims, and one statistic suggests that over 200,000 women may have been victimized over the past decade, while another has reported that in some regions, as many as 40 women are raped every day.

Despite the massive scale of violence against women committed, the level of assistance that victims can expect in the form of medical care or post-traumatic counseling service is minimal to the point of being non-existent. Only three practicing gynecologists serve North Kivu, a province of over 800,000 people. Most of the rape shelters in the DRC are operated by foreign or international non-governmental organizations. But despite this intervention by the international community, supply has been insufficient to meet demand.

In addition to psychological and physical trauma, rape victims bear socio-economic costs. The families of raped women are only paid a dowry price of two goats, if at all, as compared to the typical price of 20 goats. Consequently, raped women are often abandoned by their husbands whilst raped girls have difficulty marrying. In the context of the DRC's patriarchal society, where women are dependent on men – first their fathers and later husbands – for economic support, their status as rape victims inevitably affects their economic well-being.
