= Adversarial journalism =

Adversarial journalism refers to a style of journalism where the journalist adopts an oppositional and combative approach to reporting and interviewing. The goal of adversarial journalism is to reveal supposed wrongdoings of actors under investigation. Instead of being completely impartial, adversarial journalists take sides in what they believe to be true. They deliberately combine information with commentary or opinion in their writing. In particular, adversarial journalists remain relentlessly hostile and highly skeptical regarding government, big business companies, and political events, questions, institutions and personalities. Adversarial journalism is thought to be traditional in liberal democracies where journalism is regarded as a "Fourth Estate" (the fourth pillar of a democracy). It is also considered an extreme form of participant journalism or advocacy journalism. It has been contrasted with public or civic journalism.

== Characteristics ==
=== Treatment of sources and official accounts ===
The oppositional orientation of adversarial journalism shapes journalists' relationships with their sources, particularly political officials and institutional representatives. Rather than granting such sources deference, journalists scrutinise their statements, challenge their accounts and question the assumptions underlying their explanations. Zelizer and Allan associate this approach with heightened scepticism towards politicians and political institutions, reduced deference in interactions with officials and greater assertiveness in political reporting. By testing official claims against available evidence and drawing attention to inconsistencies or omissions, this scrutiny can require public officials and other powerful actors to account for their statements and decisions. In his theoretical framework of journalistic cultures, Thomas Hanitzsch conceptualizes the relationship between journalists and centres of power along a dimension of power distance, ranging from an adversarial orientation at one end, in which journalists openly challenge those in power, to a loyal orientation towards them at the other.

=== Verification and interpretation ===
Although adversarial journalism departs from conventional impartiality, its proponents maintain an attachment to factual verification and truth. Taking sides, according to Harcup, does not entail distorting facts to support a cause, but rather drawing conclusions from verified information and identifying those considered responsible for wrongdoing. This distinction separates the journalist's editorial position from the evidentiary basis of reporting. Hanitzsch's framework treats journalists' relationships with power, their degree of intervention in public affairs and their epistemological commitments as separate dimensions of journalistic culture; an adversarial orientation towards power does not, in itself, determine a journalist's approach to evidence or knowledge. This approach also relates to broader debates about transparency in journalism, in which making the origins and interpretative framing of a news account more visible to audiences has been discussed as an alternative to the ideal of detached objectivity.

The presentation of adversarial reporting may involve interpreting evidence, drawing explicit conclusions and assigning responsibility rather than limiting coverage to the reproduction of competing accounts. Harcup's description of the approach emphasises that journalists may combine verified information with commentary and opinion, making their interpretations of events more prominent in published reporting. The emphasis on drawing conclusions from evidence also distinguishes this approach, as described by its proponents, from the manipulation of information to advance a predetermined cause. Its public-interest rationale lies in enabling citizens to scrutinise the exercise of power and assess the conduct and explanations of those who make decisions affecting public life.

=== Practices in news production ===
Adversarialism may be expressed through different practices at different stages of news production, including the critical examination of official accounts and the questioning of sources. In a study of political press conferences involving the Swedish government, Göran Eriksson and Johan Östman found that journalists' interactions with political actors could be relatively cooperative even when the resulting news coverage was substantially more critical. Where adversarialism takes the form of confrontational interviewing, its intensity can vary. Steven E. Clayman and Matthew P. Fox distinguish between "hardball" questions, which advance an oppositional viewpoint vigorously, and "softball" questions, which do so more mildly. Confrontational interviewing is therefore one possible manifestation of adversarial journalism, rather than a necessary feature of the broader approach.

== Criticism ==
Critics have described adversarial journalism as excessively aggressive and antagonistic, accusing its practitioners of rudeness, arrogance and cynicism. They argue that the selective use of information and the interweaving of reporting with partisan commentary can turn adversarial journalism into propaganda. They contend that such reporting can undermine public trust in the news media and government, while diminishing the quality of public debate. Critics have also warned that the persistent hostility and cynicism of adversarial journalists towards politicians, public institutions and business could alienate the public from journalism and erode public faith in democracy. They further contend that adversarial journalism places excessive emphasis on political scandals and strategic manoeuvring at the expense of substantive policy issues.

Former executive editor of the American daily newspaper The New York Times Bill Keller argues that journalists should regard the suspension of personal opinions as both an occupational discipline and an institutional responsibility, supported by editorial scrutiny of their reporting. He maintains that aspiring to impartiality encourages journalists to test their assumptions, including their own, and to consider contrary evidence and arguments, allowing readers to reach their own conclusions. Keller further argues that publicly declaring a political predisposition may create an incentive to omit or minimise facts that contradict it, making reporting less credible to readers who do not already share that viewpoint.

== Support ==
Proponents of adversarial journalism, however, argue that it does not abandon verifying what is true. According to them, adversarial journalists do not manipulate any facts, but at the same time they are bold enough to accuse the people who they believe are worthy of blame. American independent investigative journalist I. F. Stone stated in the 1970s that "the first" of "the basic assumptions" for journalists covering politics to "operate on" is that "every government is run by liars, and nothing they say should be believed."

According to self-styled adversarial journalist Glenn Greenwald, the two-fold mission of journalism is "informing the public of accurate and vital information, and its unique ability to provide a truly adversarial check on those in power." Greenwald has described "fearless, adversarial journalism" to be necessary to "bring transparency and accountability to powerful governmental and corporate institutions." According to Greenwald, despite the institutionally objective tone promoted by big media institutions, the public hold these outlets with very low esteem. To Greenwald, journalism is inherently subjective and the pretense of objectivity or impartiality can be harmful because it promotes false equivalence and a superficially impartial journalist who hides their views can manipulate the reader who is unaware of those hidden views. For Greenwald, journalism requires fairness and rigorous adherence to facts, but at the same time, journalists must be forthcoming about their perspectives and subjective assumptions.

Regarding journalistic objectivity, I. F. Stone said in 1989 that "the conventions of the Washington press corps—its proximity to power, its glorification of official sources, its presumption of objectivity—left it vulnerable to manipulation..." According to him, "objectivity is fine if it's real. Every society has its dogmas, and a genuinely objective approach can break through them. But most of the time objectivity is just the rationale for regurgitating the conventional wisdom of the day." American sociologist Christian Smith wrote in 2010 that mainstream journalists who want to follow the norm of being "responsible, ...objective, balanced, value-free" and "politically neutral", thus avoiding "any hint of 'adversarial' or 'advocacy' journalism" focus less, in practice, on "in-depth analytical interpretation of events", depending heavily on so-called official news sources such as government spokespeople, political and business leaders and academic experts. The opposing sides of any issue presented by them are "limited to the officially acceptable views of Republican-versus-Democrat, conservative-versus-liberal, defense attorney-versus-prosecuting attorney", etc. American investigative journalist Matt Taibbi wrote in the Rolling Stone magazine in 2013 that "'Objectivity' is a fairy tale invented purely for the consumption of the credulous public....journalists can strive to be balanced and objective, but that’s all it is, striving....Try as hard as you want, a point of view will come forward in your story." He adds that "No matter how it’s presented, every report by every reporter advances someone’s point of view." In a podcast interview given to Canadian media outlet Canadaland in 2017, American foreign war correspondent and investigative journalist Jeremy Scahill said that "objectivity for the sake of objectivity often means make sure that the powerful always get their say. And sometimes Caesar shouldn’t have his say. Sometimes the truth is just true."

In an article published in Current Affairs in February 2022, British-American journalist Nathan J. Robinson writes that it is vitally important to have "a strong adversarial press that investigates government claims and checks whether they are supported by evidence." In particular, Robinson states that journalists need to be especially critical towards a government's justifications to start a war with another nation and hold them in highest scrutiny, as "war is the greatest horror human beings are capable of producing."

== History and current state ==
=== United States ===
The origin of adversarial journalism in the United States can be traced back to the investigative journalism in the late 18th century, when newspapers started doubting governmental actions and looked for information from other sources. This trend continued in the 19th century, when cheap and mass-produced tabloid-style newspapers collectively called the Penny press from the 1830s reinforced the idea that journalism could serve public interest and not just special interests of government, business, or powerful individuals. In the Progressive Era (1890s–1920s) of the United States, an intense form of adversarial journalism was practiced where journalists revealed wrongdoings and corruption within the government, business and established institutions, often through sensationalist publications. U.S. President Theodore Roosevelt referred to them in 1906 as "muckrakers".

After the Second World War, according to American political scientist Donald R. Matthews, media was deemed "overcooperative" regarding their relationship with the US Congress. According to historian Julian Zelizer, the press treated the political establishment with respect until the mid-1960s. According to American journalism academic Carl Sessions Stepp, in this "pre-Watergate, pre-Vietnam, pre-Dealey Plaza world", the journalists appear "naively trusting of government, shamelessly boosterish, unembarrassedly hokey and obliging", as they simply acted as messengers of "an unquestioned, quasi-official sense of things."

Starting in the late 1960s, and into the 1970s, adversarial journalism regained strength and interest as journalists covered the Civil Rights movement, the protests against the Vietnam War and the Watergate scandal that culminated in the resignation of U.S. President Richard Nixon. According to historian Matthew Pressman, between 1960 and 1980, "interpretation replaced transmission, and adversarialism replaced deference." According to Jill Lepore, a staff writer at The New Yorker magazine, this was partially due to the desire to offer something different than television, and partially a consequence of McCarthyism. Neo-conservative journalist Irving Kristol wrote in 1967 that while it is commendable to keep a reporter's prejudices out of a story, but when the same reporter refuses to give their judgment on that story, the truth is "emasculated".

In a paper presented in 1989, professor of media and communication Jian-Hua Zhu presented a differentiation model to show different kinds of adversarial attitudes of individual American journalists and journalistic organizations (which are bureaucratic enterprises governed by commerce and routine activities) towards powerful individuals (such as high-ranked public officials and corporate executives), organizations (such as legislating bodies, executive departments, courts, political parties and big corporations) and the "System" (i.e. the state) as a whole. According to Zhu, in the U.S., individual journalists are strongly adversarial towards powerful individuals, but moderately and mildly adversarial when it comes to powerful organizations and the System, respectively. Journalism organizations are, for Zhu, moderately adversarial to powerful individuals, mildly adversarial to powerful organizations, and not at all adversarial towards the System. In other words, adversarial journalists fight against the "bad guys" of power, but almost never criticizes the System which they view as inherently "good". Zhu noted that according to a survey published by Weaver and Wilhoit in 1988, compared to other roles such as the disseminator role and the interpretive role, the adversarial role was the least popular role among American journalists.

Contrary to the concerns from critics of adversarial journalism, currently American journalists with an adversarial journalistic propensity constitute a small minority. In a 2007 The American Journalist survey, it was found that while 82% of journalists considered the investigation of government claims as extremely important, only 18% deemed it extremely important to be adversarial toward the government. According to Bill Keller, striving for "fairness" in writing is a relatively modern norm in American journalism and not so long ago, openly opinionated journalism was much more commonplace.

== See also ==
- Advocacy journalism
- Alternative journalism
- Civic journalism
- Fourth estate
- Freedom of information
- Interpretive journalism
- Investigative journalism
- Journalistic objectivity
- Partisan journalism
- Press Freedom Index
- Right to know
- Tabloid journalism
- Watchdog journalism
