= Antenne A =

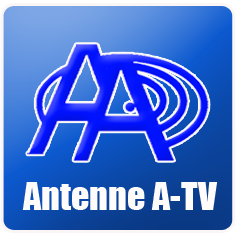
- Country: DR Congo
- Broadcast area: National
- Headquarters: Gombe, Kinshasa

Programming
- Languages: Lingala and French

Ownership
- Owner: Antenne A sprl

History
- Launched: June 13, 1991 (34 years ago)

Antenne A is the first privately owned television channel in the Democratic Republic of the Congo, with a general, apolitical, and commercial nature. Headquartered on Avenue du Livre in the Gombe commune, the channel was founded and began broadcasting in 1991.

Initially, it operated two additional stations in Mbuji-Mayi and Tshikapa, but both were forced to close due to regional instability. Antenne A predominantly airs local programming, with nearly 90% of its content tailored to Congolese audiences. The channel offers a wide array of programming across multiple genres, including music, news, talk shows, drama, sports, culture, and health. In addition to its entertainment offerings, Antenne A features educational content for children and runs commercials and public service announcements. On 24 April 1993, the channel pioneered the first-ever television lottery advertisement in the country.

== History ==
Antenne A started broadcasting in 1991, one year after Mobutu's regime changed. The channel was founded by the Franco-Israeli businessman David Zandon, with Congolese, Israeli and Belgian investors. Broadcasts started on June 13 that year using a 20 watt UHF transmitter on channel 21 in Kinshasa. Its programming was shown over two periods, 12pm to 2pm and 5pm to 10pm. Its initial programming consisted of cartoons and action films. Initially it was a "money-making" entertainment channel before becoming an independent generalist outlet.

On April 14, 1993, the channel moved from encrypted to free-to-air broadcasting and aired its first Loto broadcast on April 24. In 1994, Antenne A moves from its UHF frequency to a VHF one. The transmitter was permanently installed in May 1997, at 500W.

As of 2000, Antenne A rebroadcast parts of France 2's schedule. In 2006, Antenne A broadcast all events of Fréquence Stars. The growth of cable television in the region during the 1980s enabled approximately 89% of households in Kinshasa to access its programs by cable. On 11 December 2013, Antenne A further broadened its reach by launching via satellite on the Canal+ bouquet, as well as through cable and XDSL services. In 2015, the channel was among the first in the country to switch to digital broadcasting via the Digital Terrestrial Television (DTT) network.

Over time, Antenne A has garnered a large and loyal viewership, frequently topping audience ratings in both radio and television in Kinshasa. Its programming has diversified to include economic, cultural, social, musical, sports, and informational magazines. The channel's general director also holds the position of vice president of the Association Nationale des Entreprises Audiovisuelles Privées (ANEAP), which plays an influential role in the Congolese audiovisual sector. As part of this involvement, the general director serves on the steering committee of the French Cooperation's support for the Congolese audiovisual industry. The Institut Congolais de l'Audiovisuel (ICA), a public training center, manages aid from the French Cooperation, while also fostering connections with international partners such as the Conseil International des Radiodiffusions et Télévisions d'Expression Française (CIRTEF), which provides valuable support for the professional development of the sector.
