= Peter Matshitse =

South African soccer player

Personal information
- Date of birth: 13 December 1971 (age 54)
- Place of birth: Johannesburg, South Africa
- Height: 1.80 m (5 ft 11 in)
- Position: Defender

Senior career*
| Years | Team | Apps | (Gls) |
| – | Orlando Pirates | ? | (?) |
| – | Moroka Swallows | ? | (?) |
| – | Tembisa Classic | ? | (?) |
| – | Lehurutshe Stocks Birds | ? | (?) |
| – | Kaizer Chiefs | ? | (?) |
| – | Zulu Royals | ? | (?) |
| – | Black Leopards | ? | (?) |
| – | Jomo Cosmos | ? | (?) |
| Total | | ? | (?) |
- * Club domestic league appearances and goals

Peter Matshitse (born 13 December 1971) is a South African former professional soccer player who played as a defender for Orlando Pirates, Moroka Swallows, Tembisa Classic, Lehurutshe Stocks Birds, Kaizer Chiefs, Zulu Royals, Black Leopards and Jomo Cosmos. He was rated as one of the best defenders in the country.

After retiring as a player, Matshitse became a coach with Mothupi Birds United in January 2008.
