= .cd =

Internet country code top-level domain for the Democratic Republic of the Congo

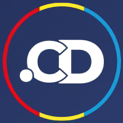
- Introduced: 20 August 1997
- TLD type: Country code top-level domain
- Status: Active
- Registry: Société Congolaise des Postes et Télécommunications
- Sponsor: Government of the Democratic Republic of the Congo
- Intended use: Entities connected with the Democratic Republic of the Congo
- Actual use: Sees some use in the Democratic Republic of the Congo, occasionally used for music websites
- Registration restrictions: None
- Structure: Registrations permitted at second level
- Dispute policies: UDRP
- DNSSEC: No
- Registry website: hosting.cd

.cd is the Internet country code top-level domain (ccTLD) for the Democratic Republic of the Congo. It was created in 1997 as a replacement for the .zr (Zaire) ccTLD, which was phased out and eventually deleted in 2001.

Except for reserved names like .com.cd, .net.cd, .org.cd, and others, anyone in the world is allowed to register a .cd domain, regardless if they have registered a company or not.

Until 2011, the registry was managed by nic.cd. It was then delegated to the Société Congolaise des Postes et Télécommunications (SCPT).

== .zr ==
.zr is the former Internet country code top-level domain (ccTLD) for Zaire. It was designated in 1996. When Zaire was renamed the Democratic Republic of the Congo in 1997, .zr was phased out and .cd took its place. In 2001, .zr was deleted.
