= Radio Television Groupe Avenir =

Congolese television network

Radio Television Groupe Avenir (RTG@) is a television network company of the Democratic Republic of the Congo. It is a member of the Groupe L'Avenir corporate group, along with the daily newspaper L'Avenir. RTG@'s offices are located in central Kinshasa's commune of La Gombe.

== Operations ==
RTG@ TV broadcasts in French and in Lingala.

RTG@ TV broadcasts on UHF channel 45 in Kinshasa, and throughout Africa on Intelsat 4 satellite television. The Ivorian television series Ma Famille is part of RTG@'s schedule.
