= Modeste Mutinga =

Congolese journalist and politician

Modeste Mutinga Mutuishayi
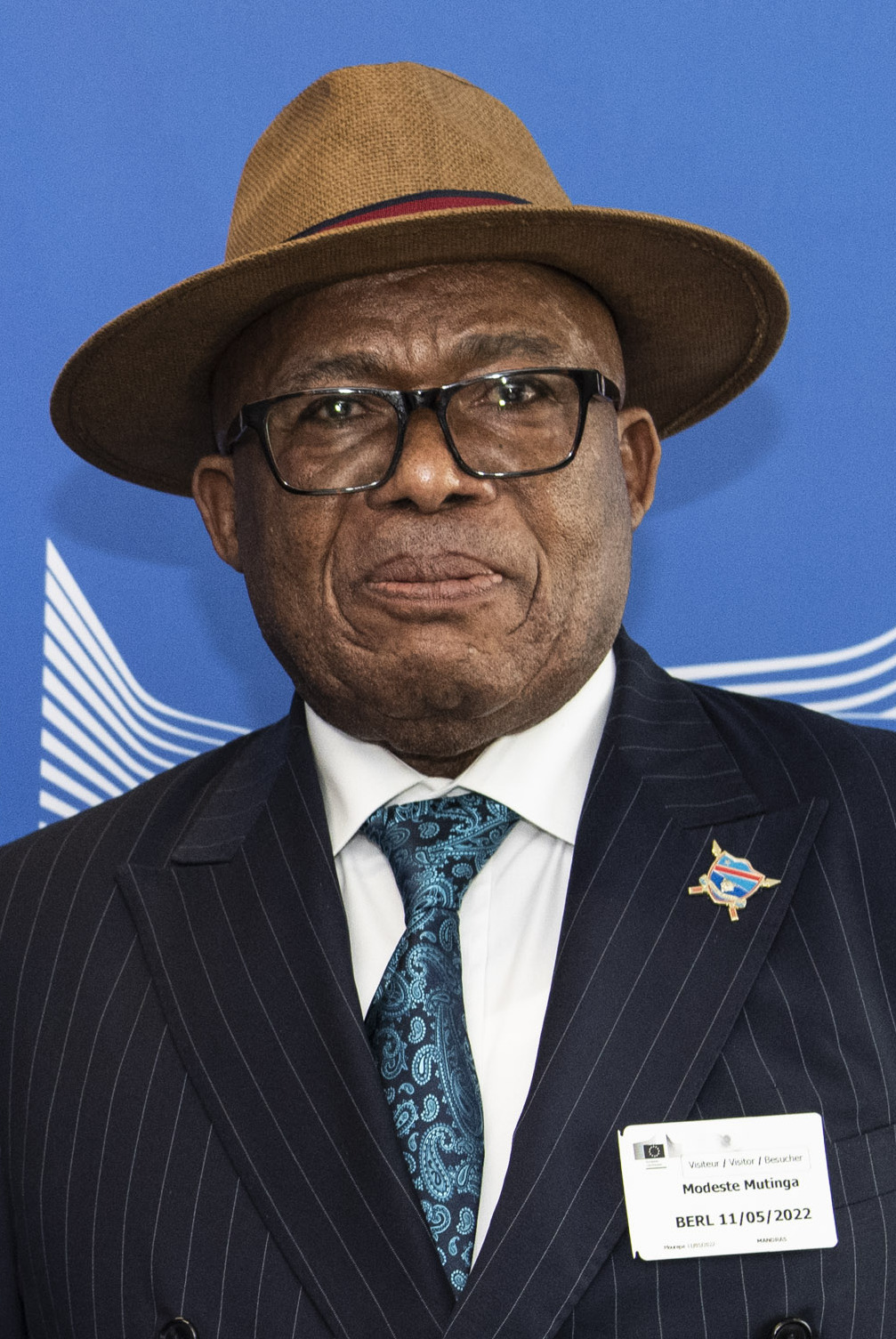
- Modeste Mutinga in 2022
- Occupations: journalist, senator
- Organization: Le Potentiel
- Political party: Alliance of the Presidential Majority
- Awards: International Press Freedom Award (2000)

Modeste Mutinga Mutuishayi, commonly known as Modeste Mutinga, is a journalist and senator of the Democratic Republic of Congo.

== Biography ==
Mutinga is the publisher of Le Potentiel, which The Committee to Protect Journalists described as "the only independent daily newspaper in the war-torn Democratic Republic of Congo". According to Mutinga, the paper has "an agenda" of promoting economic development and democracy.

Mutinga has been threatened, arrested, and jailed multiple times on charges related to his reporting. In 1992, during the Mobutu Sese Seko era, the Le Potentiel offices were bombed. In 1998, he was arrested by authorities following an article covering the house arrest of opposition leader Étienne Tshisekedi. In January 2000, he was assaulted in New York City by the advisors of DRC President Laurent-Désiré Kabila while covering a meeting of the United Nations Security Council.

In 2000, he was awarded the International Press Freedom Award of the Committee to Protect Journalists. The award citation described him as "a relentless advocate for human rights" and "an inspiration to journalists throughout Africa who continue to fight against tremendous odds for freedom of expression and better governance".

== Political career ==
From 2003 to 2006, Mutinga served as High Authority of the Media in the Transitional Government that followed the Pretoria Accord ending the Second Congo War.

He now serves as a senator in the nation's parliament as a member of the Alliance of the Presidential Majority, the party backing current president Joseph Kabila. In March 2010, he introduced legislation to attempt to regulate the "confusion" followed by the end of the Voice of Zaire's media monopoly.

Mutinga is also a member of the political bureau for Together for Change, the opposition political coalition formed by former Katanga governor Moïse Katumbi to support his presidential bid in the upcoming 2018 presidential election.
