= Kinshasa (commune) =

- Commune
- Commune de Kinshasa
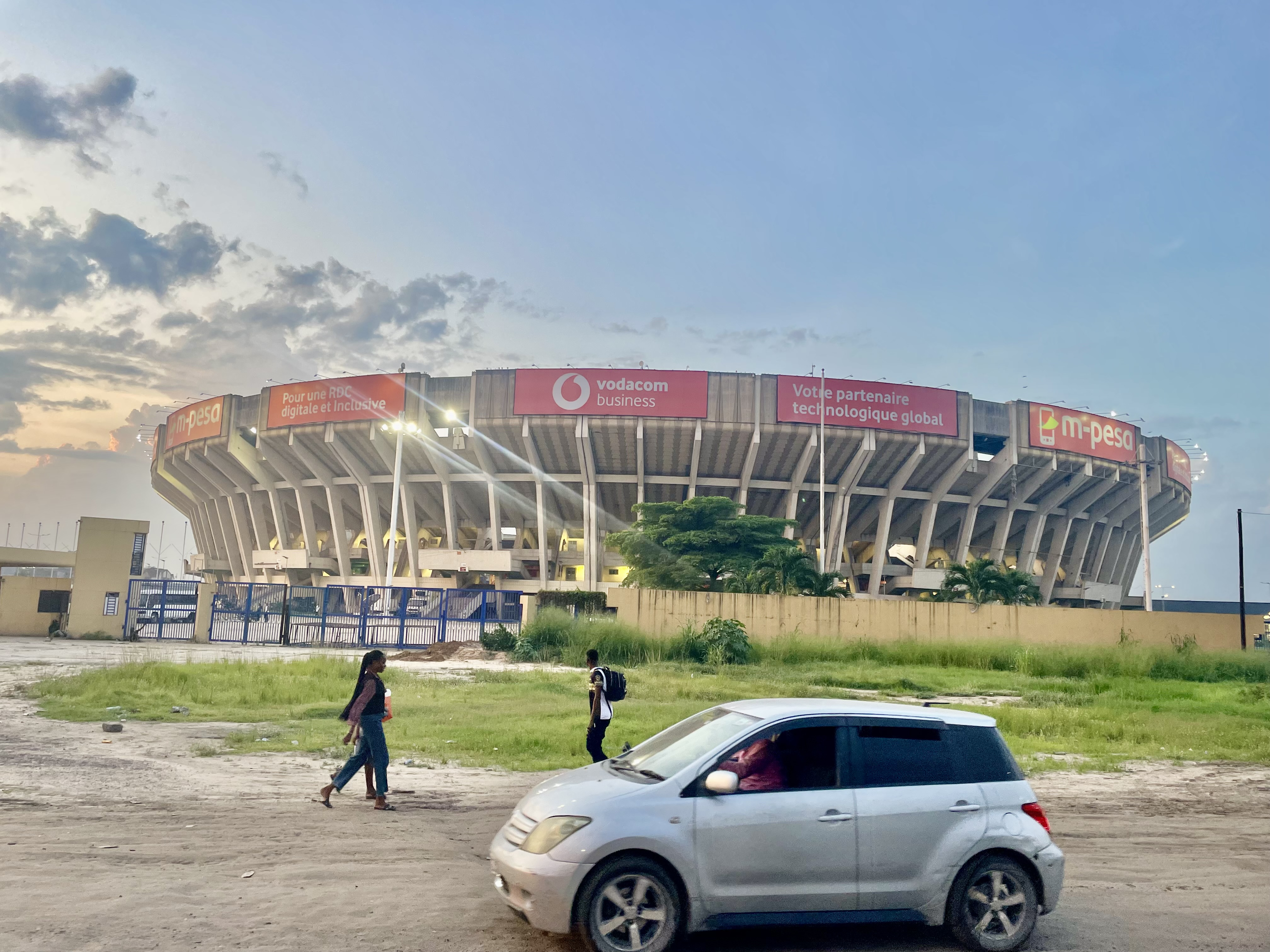
- Stade des Martyrs
- Kinshasa city-province on map of DR Congo
- Location in DR Congo
- Coordinates: 04°19′24″S 15°18′29″E
- Country: DR Congo
- City-Province: Kinshasa

Government
  - Bourgmestre: Bienvenu Mbalibi
  - Deputy bourgmestre: Prince Lekola Esoko

Area
  - Total: 2.9 km^{2} (1.1 sq mi)

Population (2015 est.)
  - Total: 453,632
  - Density: 160,000/km^{2} (410,000/sq mi)

Kinshasa is a commune of the city-province of Kinshasa, located in the Lukunga District in the western part of the Democratic Republic of the Congo. Situated in the northern section of the capital, the commune covers an area of 2.9 square kilometers and had an estimated population of 453,632 as of 2015. It is bordered to the north by Kinshasa Zoological Garden, to the south by Kalamu via Funa Avenue, to the east by Lingwala via Oil Mill Avenue, and to the west by Barumbu via Luambo Makiadi Avenue. The major thoroughfare, Boulevard du 30 Juin, and the neighboring commune of Gombe lie just to its north.

Initially developed as part of the indigenous city (cités indigènes) in the early 20th century, the Kinshasa commune was officially established by decree-law on 26 March 1957. Its current boundaries were defined by ministerial decree No. 69-0042 of 23 January 1969, and its administrative structure is governed by Law No. 082-008 of 25 February 1982, which outlines the status of the city-province of Kinshasa. The municipal headquarters is located at the intersection of Kambambare and Kasa-Vubu avenues, near Stade Cardinal Malula and Salle Mongita. The commune is divided into seven quartiers: Madimba, Ngabka, Mongala, Aketi, Djalo, Pende, and Boyoma. It hosts several significant institutions of the city of Kinshasa.

== Geography ==
=== Terrain and climate ===
The geography of the commune of Kinshasa reflects the broader geomorphological characteristics of the city-province to which it belongs. The local soil composition is predominantly sandy, with fine particles and a dark brown coloration. It exhibits high porosity and a friable consistency when dry, with a low clay content typically under 20%. The soil profile follows the AC type, comprising two mineral horizons, with the surface layer darker than the subsurface. Approximately 90% of the sand content consists of particles ranging in diameter from 250 to 500 micrometers. These soils are generally poor in organic matter and have a low degree of saturation in their absorbent complex, making them relatively infertile.

The vegetation in the commune is influenced by these soil conditions and consists primarily of savannah ecosystems, interspersed with shrubs, steppes, and low-density gallery forests. However, urban expansion has significantly reduced natural vegetation cover, with savannahs now largely confined to the hill areas and the Batéké Plateau.

The climate of Kinshasa commune is classified as AW4 under the Köppen climate classification system, indicating a humid tropical climate. The area experiences an average annual temperature of 25°C and receives approximately 1,400 mm of rainfall per year, with rain falling on about 112 days annually. The wettest months are typically November and April. The rainy season extends from mid-September to mid-May, while the dry season lasts from mid-May to mid-September. Average relative humidity stands at around 79%.

=== Administration ===
The commune was established by the decree-law of 26 March 1957. It originated as part of the indigenous township system (cités indigènes) that emerged during the early 20th century. Its present administrative boundaries were delineated by Ministerial Order No. 69-0042 of 23 January 1969, which defined the number, names, and territorial boundaries of communes in the city-province. The commune is governed under Law No. 82-008 of 25 February 1982, which establishes the legal framework for the city-province of Kinshasa.

The communal headquarters is at the intersection of Kambambare and Kasa-Vubu avenues, facing Stade Cardinal Malula and Salle Mongita. The commune is subdivided into seven quartiers: Madimba, Ngabka, Mongala, Aketi, Djalo, Pende, and Boyoma, which are further divided into avenues.

The commune has two principal governing bodies: the Municipal Council and the Municipal Executive College. The Council is the deliberative body, composed of elected municipal councillors. The Executive College implements Council decisions and manages daily administration. It comprises the bourgmestre (mayor) and deputy bourgmestre (deputy mayor), and two municipal aldermen. The bourgmestre and deputy bourgmestre may be elected from within or outside the Council and are appointed by decree of the Governor of Kinshasa within 15 days of the election results. Municipal aldermen are appointed by the bourgmestre, subject to approval, based on criteria including competence, credibility, and community representativeness.

The bourgmestre is the chief authority of the commune and heads the Municipal Executive College. The bourgmestre oversees municipal administration, maintains public order, and enforces national and provincial laws and regulations while implementing local policies. They also serve as a judicial police officer, civil status officer, and primary budgetary authority, and represent the commune in legal and external affairs. National Police units operate under the bourgmestre's authority. When the Municipal Council is not in session, the bourgmestre may, after consulting the Executive College, issue administrative and police regulations carrying penalties of up to seven days' detention or fines of up to 5,000 Congolese francs. These regulations are issued by municipal decree following deliberation by the Executive College.

Bienvenu Mbalibi is the commune's 20th bourgmestre. He took office on 5 January 2023, following his appointment by presidential decree in November 2022. His deputy is Prince Lekola Esoko.

== History ==
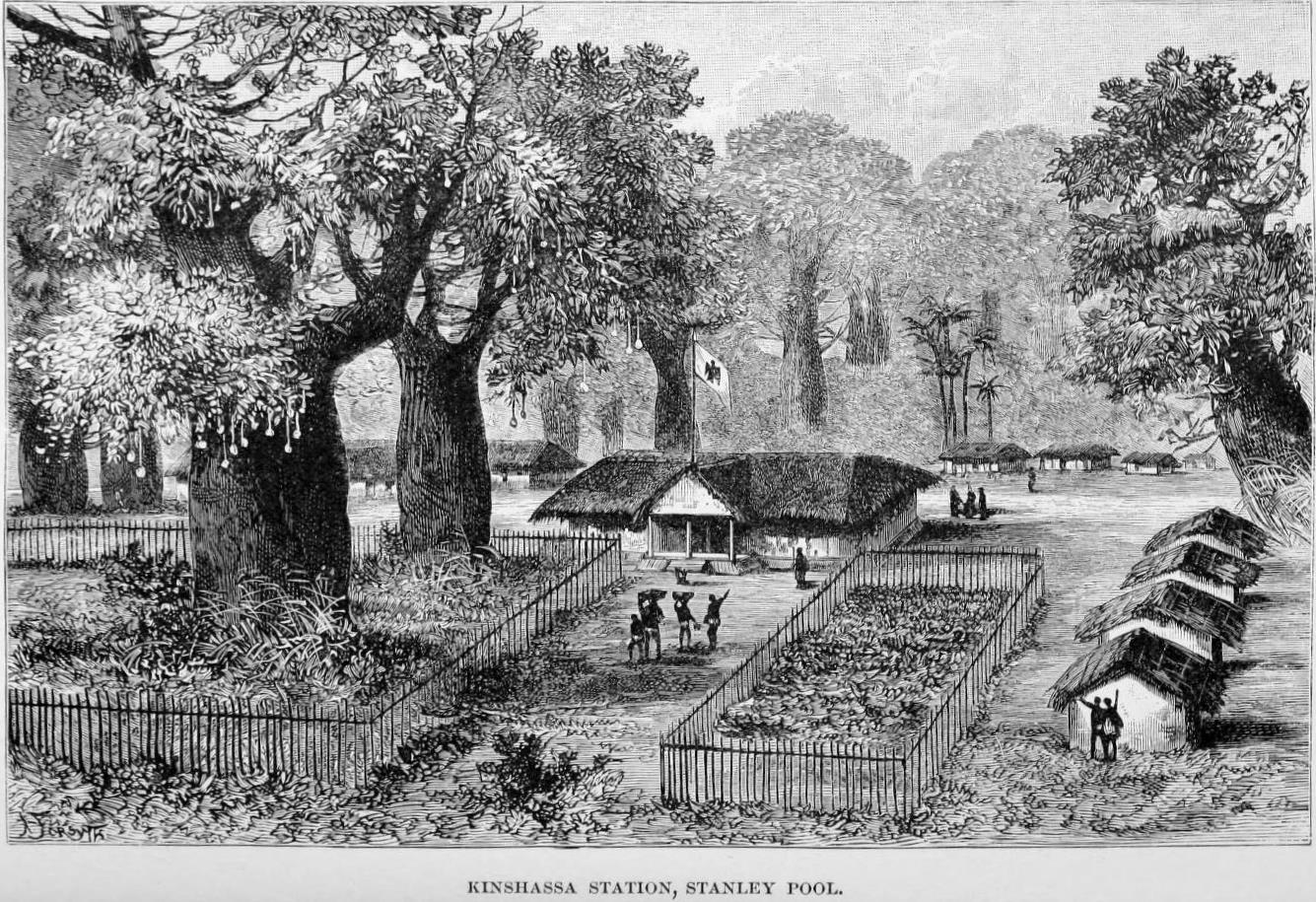
Insasa Station, by the Stanley Pool (1885)

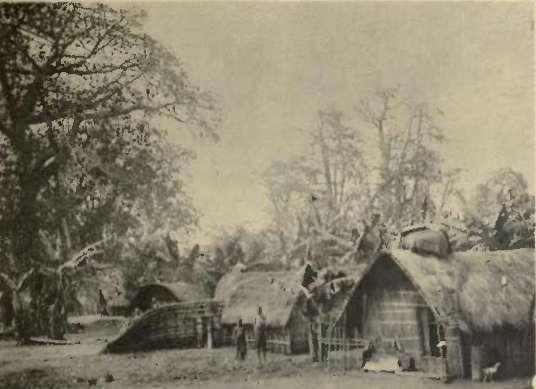
Insasa village (1912)

Archaeological evidence indicates that the site of the present-day city of Kinshasa has been inhabited for at least 40,000 years, with stone-cutting workshops and true lithic industry sites identified in the area. By the 16th century, the location had developed into a thriving regional hub, home to a major market known as Mpumbu (now Pool Malebo), which brought together several traditional settlements and ancient villages, including the village of Insasa (also known as Nshasa). It was during this period that Italian Capuchin missionaries first encountered the local leader Ngobila, marking the early stages of European interaction with the region.

The modern foundation of Kinshasa began with the third expedition of explorer Henry Morton Stanley between 1879 and 1884. During this journey, Stanley established several trading and administrative posts along the Congo River. One of these, founded in 1881 near the village of Insasa following a treaty signed with Teke chief Ntsuvila, became known as the Léopoldville Post. Initially part of Stanley Pool Station, this outpost was elevated to the status of Stanley Pool District in 1888 and further upgraded to an urban constituency in 1895. The importance of Léopoldville grew significantly with the opening of the Léopoldville–Matadi Railway in 1898, which facilitated transportation between the river and the Atlantic coast. Following the annexation of the Congo Free State by Belgium in 1908, Léopoldville became part of the newly formed Moyen-Congo District in 1910. Under the administration of Georges Moulaert, then district commissioner, efforts were made to relocate the capital of the Belgian Congo from Boma to Léopoldville, due to its strategic location on Stanley Pool (now Pool Malebo). After a series of administrative reorganizations, a royal decree issued on 1 July 1923 authorized the transfer, which was officially implemented in October 1923. The city's role as capital was formalized by Ordinance No. 58/56 of 10 August 1923. Shortly thereafter, it became the capital of the Belgian Congo and the chief town of the province of Léopoldville. A map from 1926 shows the creation of a new urban district around the capital and the incorporation of Moyen-Congo into Bas-Congo (south) and Lac Léopold II (north):

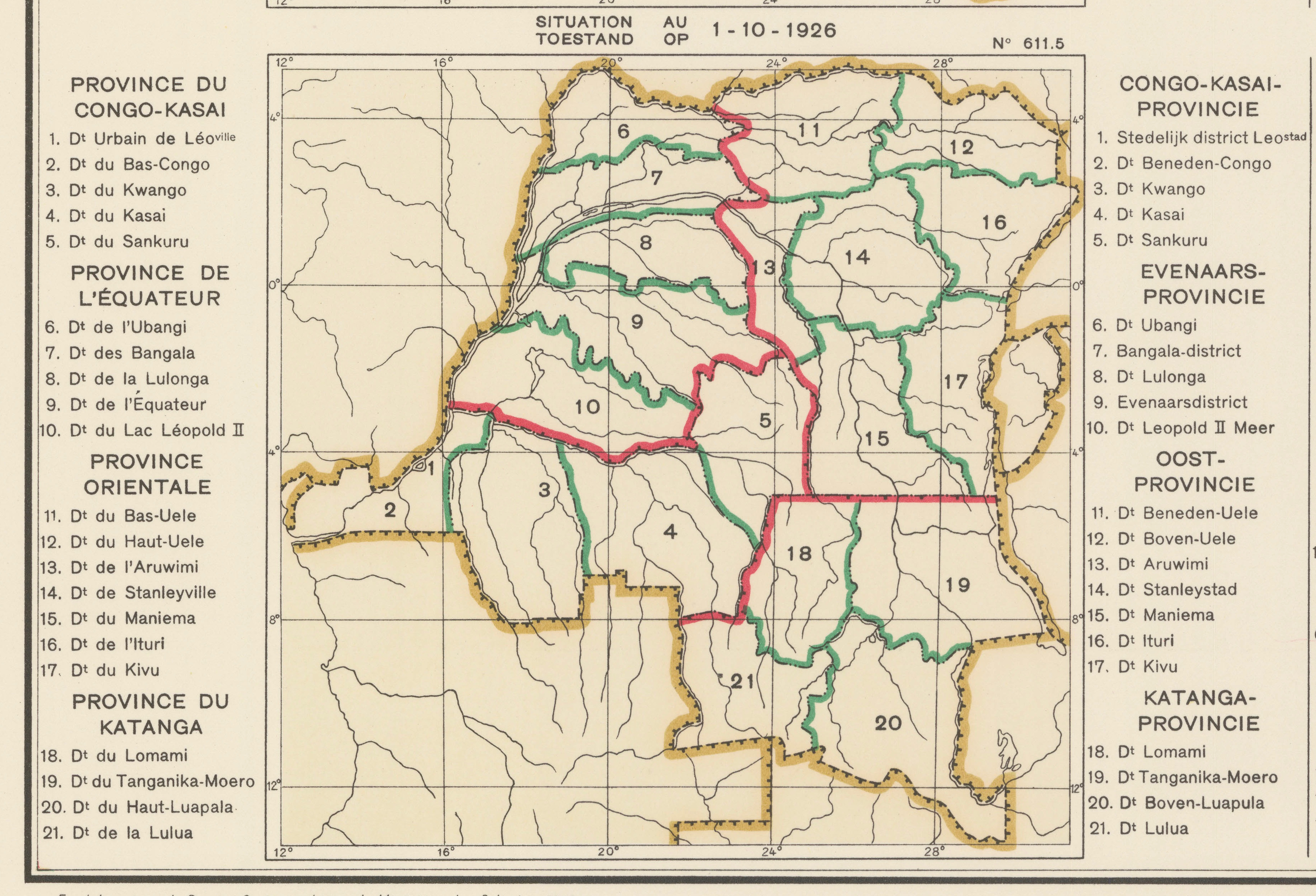
1926 provinces and districts, Moyen Congo dissolved

Léopoldville was granted civil status as a city in 1957. The city was then organized into 11 communes: Kalamu, Dendale (present-day Kasa-Vubu), Saint Jean (now Lingwala), Ngiri-Ngiri, Kintambo, Limete, Bandalungwa, Léopoldville (now Gombe), Barumbu, Kinshasa, and Ngaliema. It also included six adjunct regions: Lemba, Binza, Makala, Kimwenza, Kimbanseke, and Kingasani. Later additions to the city included the regions of Ndjili and Matete. In 1966, under President Mobutu Sese Seko's Authenticité policy, the city was renamed Kinshasa in honor of the original village of Insasa, reclaiming its indigenous identity. In 1978, Kinshasa was granted special administrative status, becoming a region (now classified as a province), with legal personality and its own institutional governance. The historian and sociologist Léon de Saint-Moulin, emphasized how colonial urban planning and policies led to the disintegration of traditional villages such as Lemba, Kintambo, Kinshasa, and Mikunga, many of which were transformed into modern communes, thereby eroding ancient cultural values and social structures. The administrative boundaries of the commune of Kinshasa were formally defined by Ministerial Order No. 69-0042 of 23 January 1969. Its governance is currently structured under Law No. 82-008 of 25 February 1982, which establishes the broader administrative and legal framework of the city-province of Kinshasa.

== Economy ==
The commune contributes significantly to the city-province's informal economy because of its location and major marketplaces. These markets distribute agricultural goods, including plantains imported from Kongo Central. Somba Zigida Market is one of the commune's main economic hubs, located at the intersection of Avenue Dima and Avenue du Plateau. In May 1989, the market hosted approximately 4,000 vendors. Somba Zigida specializes in fruits and vegetables and is often described as a "local flea market" that offers goods not readily available elsewhere in the city.

Nearby, in the adjacent commune of Kasa-Vubu, are Gambela Market (also known as Maman Apenge Market) and Masimanimba Market. Gambela Market on Gambela Avenue is one of the largest in the capital and had approximately 4,600 vendors in 1989. Masimanimba Market, near the junction of Gambela and Ethiopia avenues, also serves as a major urban parking facility. The commune's Madimba quartier surrounds the Kinshasa Central Market, one of the city-province's major marketplaces. The commune also contains major public venues such as Stade Cardinal Malula and Salle Mongita, which host sports, cultural events, and public gatherings.

== See also ==
- Communes of Kinshasa
