= Ngiri-Ngiri =

- Commune
- Commune de Ngiri-Ngiri
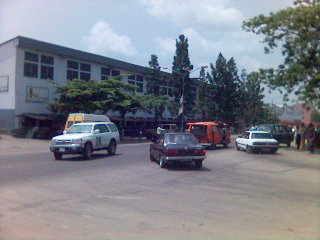
- Kasa-Vubu Avenue in Ngiri-Ngiri, with the Usine de Panification de Kinshasa (UPAK) factory located nearby
- Ngiri-Ngiri on map of Kinshasa city-province
- Location in DR Congo
- Coordinates: 4°21′27″S 15°17′54″E
- Country: DR Congo
- City-Province: Kinshasa

Area
  - Total: 3.40 km^{2} (1.31 sq mi)

Population (2015 est.)
  - Total: 481,110
  - Density: 142,000/km^{2} (366,000/sq mi)

Ngiri-Ngiri is a commune in the Funa District of Kinshasa, strategically situated in the southern part of the city. Covering an area of 3.40 square kilometers, it had a population of 99,292 in December 2008, which increased to an estimated 481,110 by 2015. The commune is bounded by Kasa-Vubu Avenue and the Kasa-Vubu commune to the north, Kwilu Street and Bumbu commune to the south, Elengesa Avenue and Kalamu commune to the east, and Liberation Avenue (formerly 24 Novembre) and Bandalungwa commune to the west.

Established in 1957 at the base of the Kalamu and Kasa-Vubu hills, Ngiri-Ngiri is administratively divided into 9 quartiers (quarters). Originally built on Non ædificandi sites prone to flooding and erosion, it is predominantly inhabited by low-income communities. The local economy is supported by agriculture, market gardening, industry, and recreational activities.

== Geography ==
Ngiri-Ngiri experiences a tropical hot and humid climate characterized by two distinct seasons: a rainy season lasting approximately eight months (from mid-September to mid-May) and a dry season. The average annual precipitation in Kinshasa is around 1,500 mm, and the average temperature ranges from 22.5 to 25 °C (72.5 to 77.0 °F). Torrential rains often result in flooding and material damage in the commune due to inadequate maintenance and cleaning of gutters and water collectors. The issue is exacerbated by water runoff from neighboring communes, including Selembao and Bumbu. Efforts to address these challenges have been made through environmental sanitation projects and the construction of gutters and collectors, notably under a partnership with Deutsche Gesellschaft für Internationale Zusammenarbeit (GIZ), a German development agency, as part of the PARIC 1 initiative. Additional infrastructure improvements, including the rehabilitation of roads and schools, have been carried out under the "Five Construction Sites of the Republic" program.

Ngiri-Ngiri is situated on clayey-sandy soil, which lacks exploitable raw materials. The dominant agricultural activity in the commune is the cultivation of legumes. It is traversed by two rivers: the Mfimi (Basoko) River along Avenue de Libération (formerly 24 November) to the west, and the Kalamu River to the east, which forms the border with the commune of Kalamu.

=== Administrative division ===
Ngiri-Ngiri is governed by municipal authorities under the oversight of Kinshasa's city administration. Leadership is provided by a mayor (Burgomaster) and a deputy mayor, both appointed by the head of state. Although reforms have proposed electing burgomasters through communal councils, this system has not yet been implemented.

The commune is administratively divided into nine quartiers (quarters), eight of which are formally managed, while one remains unofficial or "floating":

No.	Quartiers
1.	Assossa
2.	Diangenda
3.	Diomi
4.	Elengasa
5.	Khartoum
6.	Petit-Petit
7.	24 Novembre
8.	Saïo I
9.	Saïo II

== History ==
In 1945, the city of Léopoldville (now Kinshasa) extended only as far as the old estates along Kabinda Avenue. However, between 1945 and 1950, significant urban expansion occurred, resulting in the establishment of new urban areas. These developments were marked by the naming of streets after key victories achieved by the Force Publique during World War II, such as Saïo, Assossa, Gambela, and Burma. Avenue de la Victoire was named to commemorate the Allied victory in 1945.

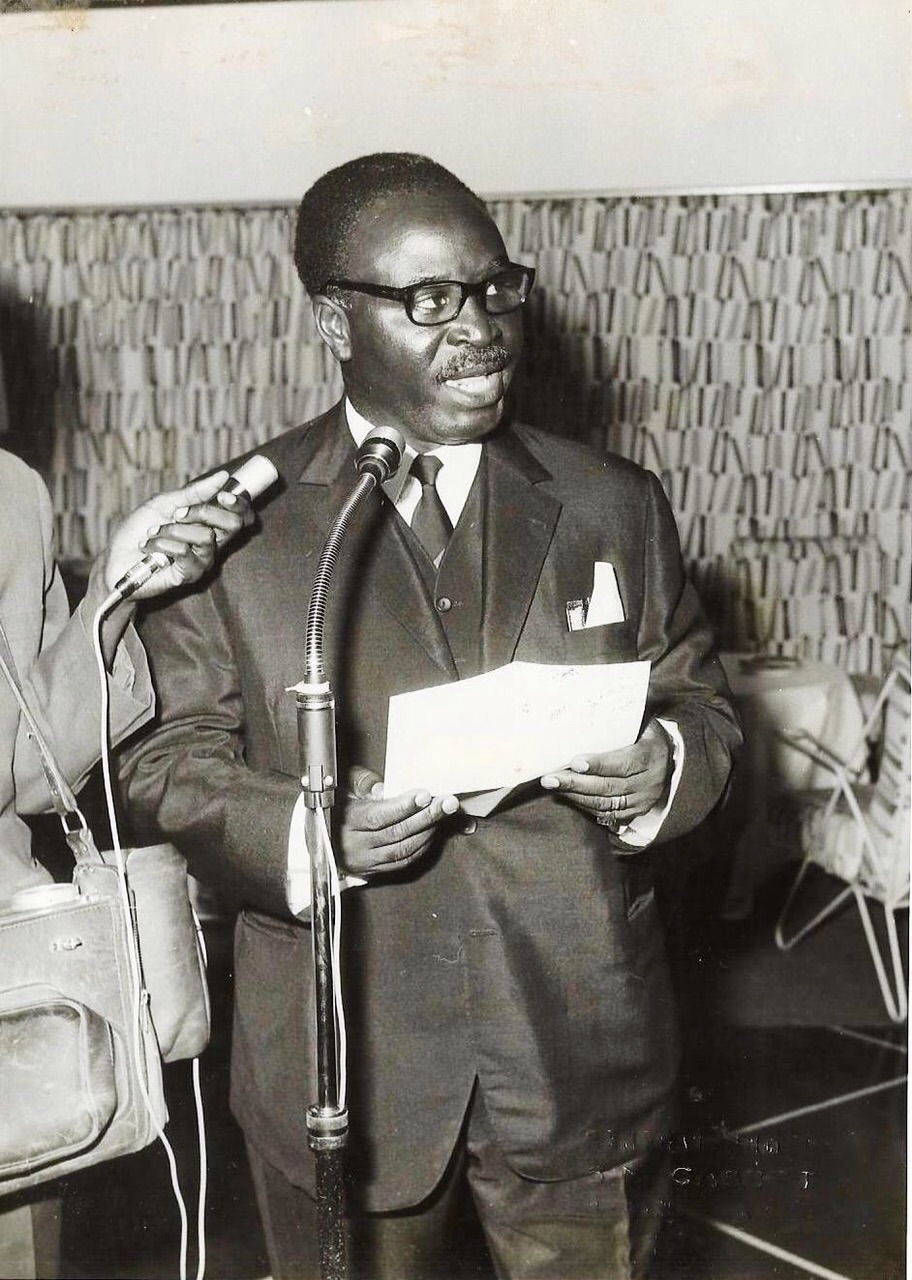
Gaston Diomi Ndongala

In the 1950s, Ngiri-Ngiri was developed as part of a broader urban planning initiative that included several planned municipalities. These municipalities, including Kasa-Vubu and Ngiri-Ngiri, were formally laid out in 1950. By 1957, Ngiri-Ngiri was officially recognized as one of the thirteen communes of Léopoldville. The first municipal elections took place in December 1957. The elections saw Bakongo candidates, appointed by colonial authorities, prevail over other ethnic groups, including those within the Liboke lya Bangala faction. The Belgian colonial administration imposed stringent restrictions on the territorial expansion of African communes like Ngiri-Ngiri, prioritizing infrastructural development in European-administered communes such as Limete, Kalina (now Gombe), and Ngaliema. These segregated enclaves, reserved for European populations, were governed by white mayors under the colonial framework. Gaston Diomi Ndongala, a native Congolese, became the first elected mayor of Ngiri-Ngiri in 1958. His leadership was followed by a succession of mayors, including Peti-Peti (1959–1963), Nsiku, Tony Malunkudi, Nkunda Mbadu, Matantu (1987–1989), and Mulamba wa Ilunga (1989–1992).

In the post-1960 era, Ngiri-Ngiri saw the construction of one of Kinshasa's first game parks on Tende Street, between Assossa and Katanga Avenues, which offered facilities for sports such as judo, karate, boxing, and table tennis, alongside a football field named Diogas, in honor of Gaston Diomi. The field was eventually replaced by Lycée Catholique Movenda and Saint Pius X Parish. During this period, the commune became home to notable cultural hubs like Mimy cinema at the intersection of Lokolenge, Saïo, and Birmanie Avenues. Ciné Toyota, previously situated at Yolo Avenue and Birmanie Avenue, has since been converted into a mosque. Meanwhile, another theater, Ciné Standard, at the crossroads of Bolafa and Katanga Avenues, now functions as a revival church.

== Demographics ==
Historical population
Year	1967	1970	1984	2003	2004
Pop.	50,930	64,272	82,303	169,087	174,843
±%	—	+26.2%	+28.1%	+105.4%	+3.4%

=== Health ===
The commune is home to various healthcare facilities. Major institutions include the Centre Hospitalier d'État de Ngiri-Ngiri, Centre Hospitalier Bolingo, Centre Hospitalier Fidji, Polyclinique de Ngiri-Ngiri, Centre Médical La Rose, Centre Médical Nsaka, Hôpital TVC (Tatete Vein Center) Médical, and Centre Hospitalier Sainte Marie. The commune also houses the Morgue de Ngiri-Ngiri, located within the Centre Hospitalier d'État de Ngiri-Ngiri. In addition to these local facilities, residents of Ngiri-Ngiri also rely on the Kintambo General Reference Hospital (Hôpital Général de Référence de Kintambo) in the neighboring Kintambo commune for specialized and advanced medical services.

=== Education ===
Ngiri-Ngiri hosts a range of prominent primary and secondary schools, along with specialized training programs. Prominent high schools and colleges include Collège Abbé Loya 1, Lycée Catholique Movenda, Collège Saint Pie X, Complexe Scolaire Sainte Agathe, and Collège Ange Raphaël. The Modern Chinese Primary School (Ecole Primaire Moderne de Chinois), located on Ngiri-Ngiri's EP III and IV site, was established via a collaboration between China and Kinshasa. The commune is also home to several institutes providing vocational and specialized education. These include the Institut Pédagogique de Ngiri-Ngiri (IPNN), Institut Technique et Social de Ngiri-Ngiri (ITS-Ngiri-Ngiri), Institut Littéraire Technique de Ngiri-Ngiri (ILTN), Institut Supérieur Technologique de Kinshasa de Ngiri-Ngiri, Institut Commercial de Ngiri-Ngiri, and Institut Monako de Ngiri-Ngiri. The Ngiri-Ngiri Athenaeum (Athénée de Ngiri-Ngiri) is also located here.

=== Religion ===
Ngiri-Ngiri is home to a diverse array of Christian denominations, sects, and other religious organizations. As of 2000, the PanAfrican News Agency reported that the commune hosted over 153 churches and sects. Prominent places of worship include the Roman Catholic parishes of Saint Pius X, founded in 1956 and part of the Saint Joseph Deanery within the Archdiocese of Kinshasa, and Sainte Agathe, established in 2003 under the same deanery. The commune is also home to two branches of the Kimbanguist Church: Église Kimbanguiste Niangara and Église Kimbanguiste Monkoto. Protestant and evangelical communities are well-represented, with institutions such as the Salvation Army (Armée du Salut), the Baptist Community of the Congo River (Communauté Baptiste du Fleuve Congo; CBFC), and the 23rd Evangelical Community of Congo (23ème Communauté Évangélique du Congo; 23ème CEC).

The commune also features other significant congregations, including FEPACO Nzambe Malamu, Église Armée de Victoire (Mission mondiale message de vie), Centre Évangélique Pentecôte Berée of Église Évangélique Bérée, Church House of Adoration (Église Maison d'Adoration), Église Évangélique Patmos, and Grace MAG. There's also a mosque that serves the commune's Muslim population.

== Economy ==
The commune relies on agriculture, market gardening, industry, and recreational activities. It is home to the Kinshasa Bread Factory (Usine de Panification de Kinshasa; UPAK), a major bread production and distribution company that serves the city. Additionally, it is the headquarters of the Amani Women's Football Club (Football Club Féminin Amani) and Club Bilenge.

The Bayaka Market (Marché Bayaka), situated at the intersection of Kasa-Vubu and Assossa avenues, serves as the central trading hub of the commune.

== Crime ==
Ngiri-Ngiri struggles with crime, particularly due to the operations of organized street gangs known locally as Kuluna. These gangs, successors to the earlier Pombas, have been a persistent issue in Kinshasa since the mid-2000s. Their criminal activities, including theft, extortion, and assault, target homes, bars, shops, boutiques, pharmacies, and public spaces. Armed with machetes, Kuluna gang members are known for their violent methods, often inflicting severe injuries or even killing victims who resist.

The rise of Kuluna gangs is closely tied to socio-economic disenfranchisement and cultural dynamics within the commune. Ngiri-Ngiri is among the areas most affected by their presence, along with nearby communes such as Ngaba, Kalamu, Matete, and Kisenso.

== Notable people ==
- Orchestre Symphonique Kimbanguiste, classical music orchestra
