= Communes of Kinshasa =

The 24 communes of Kinshasa

Abbreviations : Kal. (Kalamu), Kin. (Kinshasa), K.-V. (Kasa-Vubu), Ling. (Lingwala), Ng.-Ng. (Ngiri-Ngiri)

The city-province (ville-province in French) of Kinshasa is divided into 24 communes.

== The 24 communes of Kinshasa ==
=== Ranked by population (2015 est.) ===
Rank	Commune	District	Inhabitants	Density
1	Kimbanseke	Tshangu	2,631,205	11,066/km^{2} (28,660/sq mi)
2	Ngaliema	Lukunga	2,025,942	9,032/km^{2} (23,390/sq mi)
3	Masina	Tshangu	1,571,124	22,532/km^{2} (58,360/sq mi)
4	Limete	Mont Amba	1,330,874	15,294/km^{2} (39,610/sq mi)
5	Ndjili (N'Djili)	Tshangu	1,157,619	106,721/km^{2} (276,410/sq mi)
6	Kisenso	Mont Amba	1,157,619	69,736/km^{2} (180,620/sq mi)
7	Lemba	Mont Amba	1,120,992	47,299/km^{2} (122,500/sq mi)
8	Selembao	Funa	1,038,819	44,815/km^{2} (116,070/sq mi)
9	Kalamu	Funa	974,669	146,787/km^{2} (380,180/sq mi)
10	Bandalungwa	Funa	934,821	93,082/km^{2} (241,080/sq mi)
11	Bumbu	Funa	905,943	170,933/km^{2} (442,710/sq mi)
12	Matete	Mont Amba	854,908	175,186/km^{2} (453,730/sq mi)
13	Mont-Ngafula	Lukunga	718,197	2,001/km^{2} (5,180/sq mi)
14	Makala	Funa	698,495	124,731/km^{2} (323,050/sq mi)
15	Ngaba	Mont Amba	539,135	134,784/km^{2} (349,090/sq mi)
16	Maluku	Tshangu	494,332	62/km^{2} (160/sq mi)
17	Ngiri-Ngiri	Funa	481,110	141,503/km^{2} (366,490/sq mi)
18	Kinshasa	Lukunga	453,632	158,060/km^{2} (409,400/sq mi)
19	Kasa-Vubu	Funa	437,824	86,870/km^{2} (225,000/sq mi)
20	Barumbu	Lukunga	413,628	87,633/km^{2} (226,970/sq mi)
21	Nsele (N'Sele)	Tshangu	387,790	431/km^{2} (1,120/sq mi)
22	Kintambo	Lukunga	340,260	125,096/km^{2} (324,000/sq mi)
23	Lingwala	Lukunga	277,831	96,469/km^{2} (249,850/sq mi)
24	Gombe	Lukunga	89,080	3,037/km^{2} (7,870/sq mi)
	City-Province of Kinshasa		12,000,066	1,200/km^{2} (3,100/sq mi)

Source: Institut National de la Statistique (INS).

Kimbaseke was the most populous commune, with approximately 2.63 million inhabitants, while Gombe was the least populous, with about 89,080 inhabitants.

=== Ranked by land area (2015 est.) ===
Rank	Commune	Area (km^{2})
1	Maluku	7,948.0
2	Nsele (N'Sele)	898.8
3	Mont-Ngafula	358.9
4	Kimbanseke	237.8
5	Ngaliema	224.3
6	Masina	69.7
7	Limete	67.6
8	Gombe	29.3
9	Lemba	23.7
10	Selembao	23.2
11	Kisenso	16.6
12	Ndjili (N'Djili)	11.4
13	Bandalungwa	6.8
14	Kalamu	6.6
15	Makala	5.6
16	Bumbu	5.3
17	Kasa-Vubu	5.0
18	Matete	4.9
19	Barumbu	4.7
20	Ngaba	4.0
21	Ngiri-Ngiri	3.4
22	Kinshasa	2.9
23	Lingwala	2.9
24	Kintambo	2.7
	Total	9,965.0

Source: Institut National de la Statistique (INS).

Maluku was by far the largest commune, covering approximately 7,948 square kilometers, followed by Nsele at 898.8 square kilometers and Mont-Ngafula at 358.9 square kilometers. Kintambo was the smallest commune by land area, covering only 2.7 square kilometers.
