= Bumbu =

- Commune
- Commune de Bumbu
- Bumbu on map of Kinshasa city-province
- Location in DR Congo
- Coordinates: 04°22′26″S 15°17′51″E
- Country: DR Congo
- Province: Kinshasa

Area
  - Total: 5.30 km^{2} (2.05 sq mi)

Population (2015 est.)
  - Total: 905,943
  - Density: 171,000/km^{2} (443,000/sq mi)

Bumbu is a commune situated in the Funa District of Kinshasa. Spanning an area of 5.30 square kilometers, it is located in the hilled southern section of the city and had an estimated population of 905,943 as of 2015. Bumbu is bordered by Kwilu Street to the north, which separates it from Ngiri-Ngiri; Kimvula "Haute tension" Street to the south; Elengesa Avenue to the east, demarcating it from Makala; and Liberation Avenue to the west, bordering Selembao.

Administratively subdivided into 13 neighborhoods, Bumbu was officially constituted through ministerial decree No. 68-026 on 30 March 1962. Subsequent amendments, formalized by decree No. 69-042 on 23 January 1969, refined the boundaries and organizational framework of Kinshasa's urban communes.

== Geography ==
Bumbu is bordered by several major streets that delineate its boundaries. To the north, Kwilu Street serves as a border with Ngiri-Ngiri, with the intersection of Liberation Avenue (formerly 24 November) and Elengesa Avenue (formerly Foncobel) serving as a notable landmark. The southern boundary follows Kimvula "High voltage" Street, which intersects with the high-voltage line at Liberation Avenue. Eastward, Elengesa Avenue separates Bumbu from Makala, extending to the high-voltage line. The western border is defined by Liberation Avenue, which separates Bumbu from the commune of Selembao, running from the axis of Liberation Avenue to the intersection of Luvambanu Street and Kisibi.

Hydrologically, the Kalamu River, formerly known as Mbumbu, is the only watercourse flowing through the commune. Topographically, Bumbu is predominantly characterized by flat terrain.

=== Administrative division ===
Bumbu is governed under Kinshasa's municipal structure, with administrative authority vested in a municipal council and an executive college. Leadership is provided by a mayor (Burgomaster) and a deputy mayor, both appointed by the head of state. Although there have been discussions about electing mayors through communal councils, this reform has not yet been implemented.

The commune is administratively subdivided into 13 neighborhoods:

No.	Neighborhoods
1.	Mongala
2.	Ubangi
3.	Lokoro
4.	Maindombe
5.	Kwango
6.	Lukenie
7.	Kasai
8.	Mfimi
9.	Lieutenant Mbaki
10.	Dipiya
11.	Ntomba
12.	Mbandaka
13.	Matadi

== History ==
Bumbu was established as an urban commune by ministerial decree No. 68-026 on 30 March 1962, and its jurisdictional boundaries and status were further defined by ministerial decree No. 69-042 on 23 January 1969. Prior to its institutional recognition, the area functioned as a territorial subdivision within the suburban territory of Kimwenza, with its administrative center located in what is now Mont-Ngafula. These decrees formalized Bumbu's transition from a territorial zone to a recognized commune within the city of Kinshasa.

Over the years, Bumbu experienced various administrative changes. Initially known as Sinalco between 1963 and 1968, the area was managed by appointed administrative officials. It was subsequently renamed Bumbu in 1968, governed by communal mayors. In 1972, the commune was reclassified as a zone, overseen by zone commissioners and their assistants. Following the ascension of the Alliance des Forces Démocratiques pour la Libération du Congo (AFDL) in 1997, Bumbu was reinstated as an urban commune under the leadership of interim mayors as mandated by ministerial decree No. 97-001 on 11 June 1997. In 2002, interim governance was replaced by mayors and deputy mayors appointed under decree-law No. 101/2002 of 7 August 2002.

Currently, Bumbu operates under the governance framework established for all urban communes in Kinshasa. It is regulated by decree-laws No. 131/97 of 8 October 1997, and No. 081/98 of 2 July 1998, which revised earlier ordinances regarding the territorial, political, and administrative organization of the Democratic Republic of Congo and the status of Kinshasa.

== Demographics ==
Historical population
Year	1967	1970	1984	2003	2004
Pop.	37,560	61,366	113,968	318,396	329,234
±%	—	+63.4%	+85.7%	+179.4%	+3.4%

=== Health ===
The commune's primary state-run health institution is the Centre de Mère et Enfant de Bumbu, situated between Mafuta and Lubaki Avenues, near the town hall. In addition to this center, Bumbu is home to 12 maternity wards and 16 government-approved small health centers. Despite these resources, inadequate transportation networks isolate residents, raising the cost of goods and complicating access to medical services. The lack of accessible roads also delays the evacuation of critically ill patients to central Kinshasa for specialized care.

Sanitation in Bumbu is critically deficient, with pervasive waste accumulation along streets and in gutters. Drainage systems are often obstructed by plastic bags, bottles, sand, and organic debris. This unchecked pollution leads to stagnant water, creating ideal breeding grounds for disease-carrying mosquitoes. Consequently, malaria and typhoid fever are prevalent health challenges in the area.

==== Environmental and health challenges ====
The absence of structured waste management in Bumbu leads to increased environmental degradation and health hazards. Stagnant water, accumulating in improperly discarded waste, serves as an ideal habitat for malaria-transmitting mosquitoes. Rotting organic waste pollutes the soil and water, resulting in more cases of typhoid and other waterborne diseases. Unregulated dump sites worsen the crisis by drawing vermin and insects that carry infectious diseases. While conditions like asthma, pneumonia, and cholera are less widespread in Bumbu, the commune's sanitation challenges continue to pose a significant threat to public health.

=== Religion ===
Christianity is the most prevalently practiced religion in Bumbu, with a significant presence of Catholicism, Pentecostalism, and other Christian denominations. The commune hosts two Catholic parishes: Saint Jean-Baptiste, situated in the Matadi neighborhood, and Saint Antoine, established in 1963 on Assossa Avenue. Both parishes fall under the jurisdiction of the Archdiocese of Kinshasa. In addition to Catholicism, Bumbu also hosts a parish of the Church of Jesus Christ on Earth (Église de Jésus Christ sur la terre), a religious denomination founded by Simon Kimbangu, located in the Lieutenant Mbaki neighborhood. The commune is also home to several churches affiliated with the Church of Revival, which are part of the broader Pentecostal movement. The Baptist Community of Congo (Communauté Baptiste du Congo; CBCO) also has a church in Bumbu.

=== Education ===
Bumbu's educational institutions comprise 41 preschools, 77 primary schools, and 52 secondary schools.

== Transport ==
Bumbu faces significant transportation challenges stemming from inadequate infrastructure. The commune is landlocked, with limited and unsafe access routes, compounded by an absence of efficient urban planning. Disorganized construction practices and issues related to soil erosion also degrade the commune's transport network.

The primary route accessing Bumbu is the extension of Katanga Avenue; however, it becomes impassable at its intersection with Ngiri-Ngiri Avenue, transforming into a swampy quagmire during the rainy season. This particular stretch of road is infamous for entrapping vehicles in mud, often leaving them abandoned. In response to this situation, Bumbu has seen the emergence of local youth groups who offer assistance to stranded vehicles for a modest fee. This service has developed into a notable economic activity for the youth, who utilize implements such as shovels, hoes, and carts to facilitate the clearing of the route. Due to the deteriorated condition of this thoroughfare, taxis, buses, and other vehicles tend to bypass the area, compelling residents to traverse considerable distances to access essential services, including the health and maternity center. While the majority of Bumbu's arterial roads remain in relatively better condition, the southern parts of the commune, alongside the entryway to Assossa Avenue, which leads to the Saint Antoine de Padoue parish, remain problematic.

Assossa Avenue serves as a critical route for commercial exchanges between Bumbu, Ngiri-Ngiri, Selembao, and Kasa-Vubu, and as a supplier of food products to these areas. The section of Assossa Avenue connecting Bumbu and Ngiri-Ngiri was asphalted in May 2022 as part of the Tshilejelu project, an initiative led by President Félix Tshisekedi. This three-kilometer stretch, extending from the intersection of Ngiri-Ngiri and Assossa avenues to Manifesto Avenue (Bumbu), provides better access to Liberation Avenue.

== Notable people ==
- Shora Mbemba, singer-songwriter and dancer
- Gaspard-Hubert Lonsi Koko, essayist, novelist and political analyst
- Youssouf Mulumbu, professional footballer
