= Mont Amba District =

- Kinshasa districts and communes, Mont Amba in center
- Coordinates: 4.362758°S 15.336742°E
- Country: DR Congo
- City-Province: Kinshasa

Mont Amba is an area of the capital city of Kinshasa, Democratic Republic of the Congo, comprising five of the city-province's twenty-four administrative divisions—the communes of Kisenso, Lemba, Limete, Matete and Ngaba. It is one of the four so-called districts of Kinshasa. These were the administrative divisions of Kinshasa during much of the Mobutu years (1965-1997) and around which a number of government systems and services are still organized. For instance, Mont Amba makes up an eleven-member National Assembly constituency designated as Kinshasa III. However, these districts are not part of Congo's territorial organization.

Mont Amba takes its name from the hill in its extreme southwest on which the main campus of the University of Kinshasa is situated. Its western border rises from there to the Congo river east of the downtown district. It is separated from the Tshangu District further to the east by the Ndjili River.

Mont Amba is home to several parts of the University of Kinshasa, including the regional center for nuclear research. As of March 2011, the reactor at this center had not been operational for several years. The Mont Amba Medical Center in Lemba is a teaching hospital for the university. In June 2011 the first plastic surgery clinic in the DRC was opened at the hospital, primarily for the treatment of children who had been burned.

Limete Tower

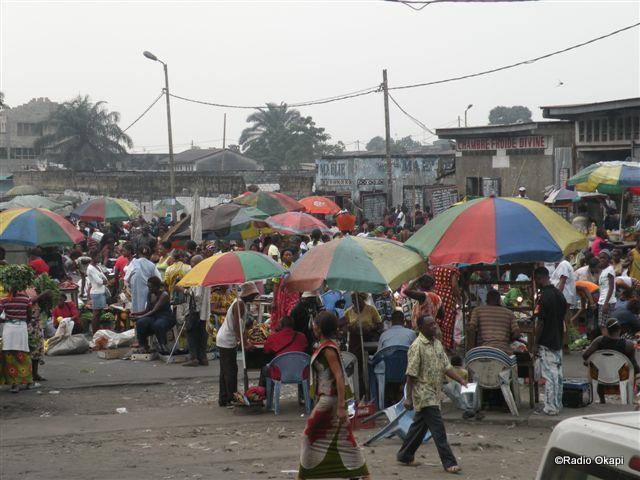
Market in Matete

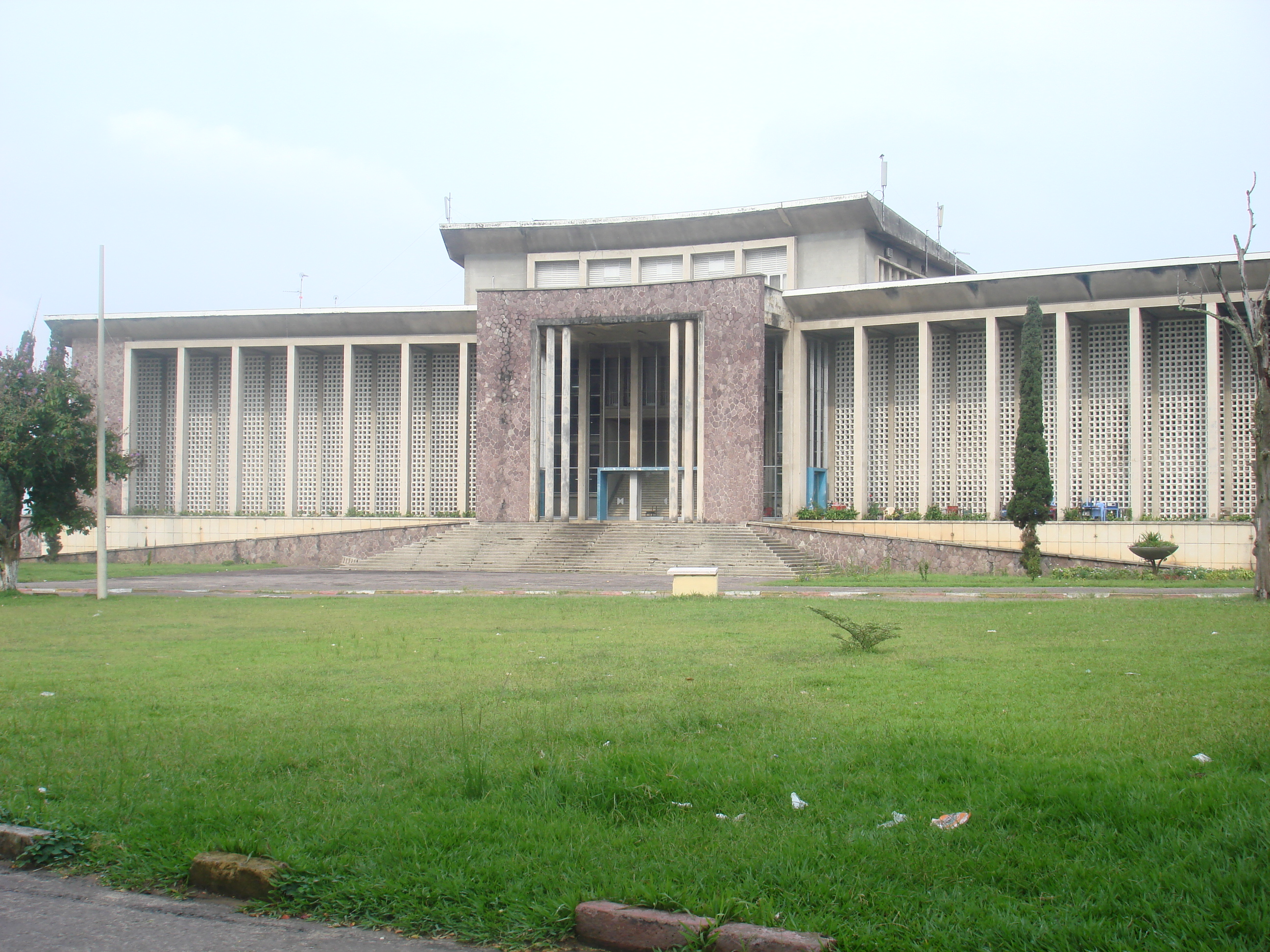
The Rectorat, main administrative building at the University of Kinshasa, in Lemba
