= Funa District =

- Kinshasa districts and communes, Funa to the west
- Coordinates: 4.3575°S 15.2971°E
- Country: DR Congo
- City-Province: Kinshasa

Funa is an area of the capital city of Kinshasa, Democratic Republic of the Congo, comprising seven of the city-province's twenty-four administrative divisions—the communes of Bandalungwa, Bumbu, Kalamu, Kasa-Vubu, Makala, Ngiri-Ngiri and Selembao. It is one of the four so-called districts of Kinshasa, which were the administrative divisions of the city during much of the Mobutu years (1965-1997) and around which a number of government systems and services are still organized. For instance, Funa makes up a twelve-member National Assembly constituency designated as Kinshasa II. However, these districts are not part of Congo's territorial organization.
