= Ngaba =

- Commune
- Commune de Ngaba
- Ngaba on map of Kinshasa city-province
- Location in DR Congo
- Coordinates: 4°22′32″S 15°19′19″E
- Country: DR Congo
- City-Province: Kinshasa

Area
  - Total: 4.0 km^{2} (1.5 sq mi)

Population (2015 est.)
  - Total: 539,135
  - Density: 130,000/km^{2} (350,000/sq mi)

Ngaba is a commune located in the Mont Amba District of Kinshasa, the capital city of the Democratic Republic of the Congo. It spans an area of 4.0 square kilometers and has an estimated population of 539,135 as of 2015.

Situated in the southern part of Kinshasa, Ngaba is a relatively recent settlement characterized by its hilly terrain. The commune is bounded by Kikwit Avenue to the north, By-pass Avenue to the south, the Kalamu River to the east, and Université Avenue to the west. It shares borders with the communes of Limete to the north, Lemba to the east and south, and Makala to the west. Administratively, Ngaba is divided into six quartiers (quarters): Baobab, Bulambemba, Luyi, Mateba, Mpila, and Mukulwa.

== Geography ==
Ngaba is defined by its distinct boundaries and topographical features. To the north, the commune is bordered by the intersection of Université Avenue and Kikwit Avenue, extending to the Yolo River. Its eastern boundary follows the Yolo River to a fork, where a straight north–south line connects to By-pass Avenue, marking the border with the Lemba commune. The southern extremity is defined by By-pass Avenue, extending westward to its intersection with Université Avenue. To the west, Ngaba's boundary follows Université Avenue back to its intersection with Kikwit Avenue.

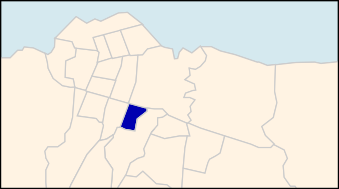
Ngaba on map of city communes

The commune's topography features a predominately large plain, complemented by a hill located in the southern part of the commune. Climatically, Ngaba is characterized by a bi-seasonal tropical climate, with a rainy season lasting from September to May and a dry season occurring from June to August.

=== Administrative division ===
Ngaba was established as a commune by Ministerial Decree No. 6836 on 30 March 1968, which introduced and named the new communes of Kinshasa. This legal framework was further substantiated by Ministerial Decree No. 69–0042 on 23 January 1969, which clarified the number, names, and boundaries of Kinshasa's urban communes. The commune's name honors a prominent Teke-Humbu chief, Ngaba, who resided near the Ngaba Roundabout, close to the Catholic parish and the small market of Makala.

Ngaba is governed by Kinshasa's municipal authorities and operates under a municipal council and an executive college. Leadership is provided by a mayor (Burgomaster; French: Bourgmestre) and a deputy mayor, both appointed by the head of state. While a reform plan calls for the election of burgomasters by communal councils, this has yet to be implemented.

The commune is administratively divided into six quartiers (quarters):

- Baobab
- Bulambemba
- Luyi
- Mateba
- Mpila
- Mukulwa

== Economy and culture ==
Ngaba's economic state mirrors the socio-economic challenges faced by its population, which is largely composed of residents from the provinces of Bandundu and Kongo Central (Kongo, Yanzi, Pende, Zombo, Yaka, Mbala, and others).

Economic activities in Ngaba are primarily subsistence-based, driven by the population's low purchasing power. Around 70% of the active population is involved in informal sector activities, including small-scale commerce such as street vending, small shops, and the sale of items like peanuts, sachet water, cigarettes, and biscuits. Other prevalent activities include market gardening, operation of small pharmacies, and technical services like sewing, carpentry, masonry, and auto repairs. These businesses are concentrated along main thoroughfares, particularly Université Avenue and Kianza Avenue, as well as in small markets throughout the commune.

Unemployment, particularly among young people, has contributed to the rise of juvenile delinquency, with organized gangs, locally known as kuluna, operating across neighborhoods. Poverty is evident through various indicators, such as inadequate housing, limited access to essential services like water, electricity, healthcare, education, transportation, and sanitation, and restricted food security.

Housing in Ngaba is predominantly composed of small, concrete block structures, often with just two rooms. Due to the lack of a public housing policy and high land prices, rental housing has become widespread, with decent housing accessible only to a privileged minority. Ownership of a well-built and fenced property, particularly in the Mbulambemba quartier, is seen as a status symbol and a source of social pride. Tree planting also contributes to the local economy, with quartiers hosting various fruit-bearing and economically valuable trees such as avocado, palm, mango, papaya, moringa, safou, soursop, orange, coconut, and coffee trees, which provide additional income sources for residents.

=== Religion ===
The predominant religions are Christianity and Animism, with hyperreligiosity evident in the proliferation of revival churches, often two or more per avenue. Community organization is notable, with residents forming mutual aid societies such as likelemba and moziki, as well as tribal support groups.

== Crime and environmental issues ==
=== Crime ===
Ngaba faces significant challenges related to crime, particularly the rise of organized street gangs, locally referred to as Kuluna. The prevalence of banditry is closely linked to the socio-economic disenfranchisement and cultural influences within the commune. Media consumption, particularly among the youth, exerts a significant influence, as televised representations that feature themes of street culture, music, and performance arts often lead young viewers to emulate the behaviors they observe.

Theatre productions (colloquially termed Maboke) such as Konzo, Isamël, Les Savants, and Paradox, as well as popular musical acts, have inspired local youth to adopt behaviors that occasionally culminate in juvenile delinquency. For instance, impressionable youth often emulate performers' flamboyant mannerisms, including obscene dancing and street slang, while others succumb to hemp smoking and gang affiliation. The formation of informal groups and gangs, such as Youpiyey and its affiliates perpetuate inter-group rivalries and cyclical violence. A deficit in parental supervision aggravates these issues, leaving many adolescents bereft of moral guidance and susceptible to criminal enterprises.

=== Environmental issues ===
Commune's hygiene standards are alarmingly low, with approximately 90% of households lacking properly constructed latrines and 10% having no toilets at all. Overcrowding exacerbates the situation, with some households reportedly accommodating more than 50 members. The lack of organized waste disposal and treatment systems leads to widespread pollution. Household waste and wastewater are often dumped indiscriminately, turning streets into makeshift garbage dumps. These dumps obstruct access to certain quartiers and pose serious health risks, particularly during the rainy season when the incidence of waterborne diseases surges. Additionally, the poverty-stricken population resides in precarious housing conditions, often in makeshift dwellings located near riverbeds or large dumpsites.
