= Makala =

- Commune
- Commune de Makala
- Makala on map of Kinshasa city-province
- Location in DR Congo
- Coordinates: 4°22′37″S 15°18′37″E
- Country: DR Congo
- City-Province: Kinshasa

Area
  - Total: 5.60 km^{2} (2.16 sq mi)

Population (2015 est.)
  - Total: 698,495
  - Density: 125,000/km^{2} (323,000/sq mi)

Makala is a commune located in the Funa District of Kinshasa, the capital city of the Democratic Republic of the Congo. Covering an area of 5.60 square kilometers, Makala is situated in Kinshasa's southern hilly region and has an estimated population of 698,495 as of 2015.

The commune is notable for housing the Makala Central Prison, strategically sited at the confluence of the Makala and Selembao communes. It is also the site of the Chemin Neuf Community's mission in the Democratic Republic of the Congo, where significant humanitarian initiatives, including the operation of primary and secondary schools and support for street children, are undertaken. Close to the Ngaba Roundabout market, a major trading post for Kongo Central's agricultural products, Makala benefits from its location along National Road No. 1, attracting residents from surrounding areas like Ngaba and Lemba.

== Etymology ==
The name "Makala" has disputed origins; some attribute it to the Humbu word meaning "cry", while others suggest it derives the Lingala word for charcoal ("makala"), associated with the Bangala people's charcoal trade near the present site of Makala Central Prison.

== Geography ==
Makala originated as a village situated at the geomorphological transition between the alluvial plain of the Congo River and the southern highlands. The alluvial plain, which spans 5 to 7 kilometers in width and has an area of approximately 100 km^{2}, lies between 300 and 320 meters above sea level. Surrounding this lowland, the southern hills, including the Ngaliema, Amba, and Ngafula heights, ascend to altitudes ranging from 350 to 675 meters, delineating the southern frontier of the city and extending towards the Batéké Plateau in the southeast. The geomorphology of these uplands, such as the Binza and Kimwenza heights, is thought to have arisen from the erosional disintegration of the plateau.

The commune of Makala is bordered by several major avenues and communes: Bay-Pass Avenue separates it from Mont-Ngufula, University Avenue separates it from Ngaba, Elengesa Avenue divides it from Ngiri-Ngiri and Selembao, and Kikwit Avenue marks the boundary with Kalamu. The Kalamu River traverses the commune, splitting it into two distinct parts. Makala 1, located north of the river, extends to University Avenue, while Makala 2 lies to the south and extends to Elengesa Avenue. Makala 2 is less densely urbanized, often afflicted by erosive processes and flooding during the rainy season, exacerbated by the river's lack of dredging.

=== Administrative division ===
Makala operates under the governance of Kinshasa's municipal authorities and is administered by a municipal council and an executive college. Leadership is provided by a mayor (Burgomaster; French: Bourgmestre) and a deputy mayor, both appointed by the head of state. Although plans for burgomaster elections by communal councils have been proposed, this reform has not yet been implemented.

Administratively, Makala is divided into 18 neighborhoods:

- Bagata
- Bahumbu
- Bolima
- Kabila
- Kisantu
- Kwango
- Lemba village
- Mabulu I
- Mabulu II
- Malala
- Mawanga
- Mmfidi
- Mikasi
- Salongo
- Selo
- Tampa
- Uele
- Wamba

=== Urbanization ===
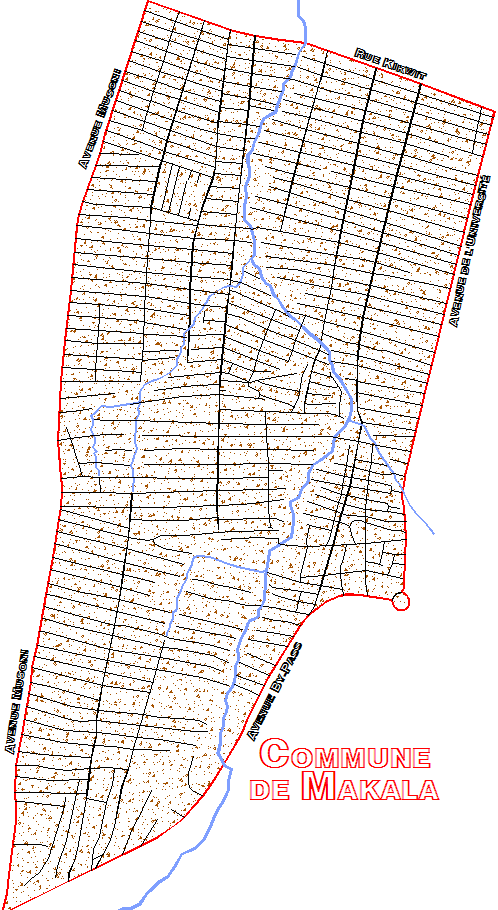
Makala Map

Urbanization in Makala began in the 1950s, and the village was incorporated into the city of Kinshasa in 1958, alongside 12 other communes. Over time, Makala became an integral part of Kinshasa's urban framework, characterized by peripheral breakpoints that serve as key, albeit sometimes poorly defined, nodes within the city's fabric. Positioned at the interface between the hills and the terraces of the plain, Makala and its neighboring commune, Bumbu, occupy areas that were previously home to older villages, including Makala's original settlement near the Bumbu River. By 1975, the Atlas of Kinshasa described Makala and similar neighborhoods, including Masina and Ngaba, as "eccentric and extension neighborhoods", a characterization indicative of its transitional role from rural origins to a burgeoning peri-urban enclave.

Makala's urban planning adopted a geometric grid system of north-south and east-west streets, which is only disrupted by natural features such as the Kalamu River. This systematic grid layout design, initially optimized for the flat alluvial terrain, was later extrapolated onto the more precipitous slopes of the southern highlands. However, this rigidly uniform layout proved inadequate for the topographical nuances of the hilly regions, precipitating significant soil erosion during the rainy seasons.

In November 2010, the provincial administration of Kinshasa initiated remedial measures to address the urban planning challenges that afflicted Makala, alongside other communes. Under the auspices of the Provincial Minister of Land Affairs, Urbanization, and Housing, Antoine Bidingi Muzingu, two key appointees were tasked with rectifying the chaotic spatial development: Menteke Nembe for housing and Aseke Ehuke for urban planning. These appointments marked a pivotal effort to mitigate the pervasive issues of unregulated construction and urban sprawl plaguing the commune for the first time. Among the notable disruptions to Makala's grid-like spatial order is the Ngaba Roundabout, situated at the commune's southeastern periphery, where it intersects with Ngaba and Lemba.

== History ==
The area now known as Makala was once part of a dense forest that encompassed the present-day communes of Ngaba, Makala, Selembao, Bumbu, Mont Ngafula, and the Binza district. Historically, the region was governed by Teke-Humbu Chief Musoni.

In 1968, Makala and its surrounding areas, previously part of the Kasangulu territory, were annexed to the city of Kinshasa and subdivided into distinct communes. Joseph Tuwanuka served as the first mayor of Makala following its formal establishment as a commune.

== Demographics ==
Historical population
Year	1967	1970	1984	2003	2004
Pop.	37,200	49,346	108,939	245,487	253,844
±%	—	+32.7%	+120.8%	+125.3%	+3.4%

=== Health ===
Makala's public health faces significant challenges, compounded by socio-economic instability and the absence of adequate medical infrastructure. The commune lacks a central medical facility, such as a hospital or polyclinic, to provide comprehensive care. Its sole public emergency center, located in the town hall, is in disrepair and falls short of addressing the population's growing needs.

The absence of effective public health governance has led to the proliferation of unregulated health centers, some of which operate without recognition by the official health zone. Access to quality healthcare is hindered by the isolation of certain neighborhoods, the remoteness of health facilities, insufficient equipment and medicines, the lack of specialized institutions, and the absence of essential services such as blood banks and consistent vaccination programs. Socio-economic pressures worsen health issues, as high youth unemployment and poverty drive organized crime (kuluna, street gangs), drug abuse (notably supu na tolo), and sexual violence. Young women face risks like prostitution, leading to early pregnancies, single parenthood, and exposure to sexually transmitted diseases like HIV/AIDS.

==== Access to water and electricity ====
The dilapidated infrastructure of the Régie de Distribution d'Eau (REGIDESO) has resulted in widespread shortages of potable water, leaving many households without reliable access. Similarly, the aging power grid managed by the Société Nationale d'Électricité (SNEL) has caused frequent outages, leaving peripheral neighborhoods in darkness.

=== Education ===
The education system in Makala faces several challenges, largely attributed to socio-economic issues such as rampant unemployment and parental poverty, the persistent non-enforcement of free primary education, and an acute dearth of publicly funded schools, which has led to the proliferation of underperforming private institutions. Additionally, the exorbitant tuition fees contrast sharply with the low incomes of many families. Other challenges include the remoteness of educational facilities, acoustic disturbances emanating from terraces and revivalist congregations, and an overarching deficit in cultural centers, public libraries, and literacy-promoting initiatives. The absence of vocational and technical training centers also perpetuates the disenfranchisement of youth from skill acquisition avenues.

Nevertheless, Makala hosts several primary and secondary schools and a notable higher education institution, the Institut Supérieur d'Enseignement Technique Médical (ISETM). This private institution was evaluated by the government as "viable", earning a score of 63.5 out of 100 in a national assessment where institutions scoring below 50 were closed. Since 2016, the Mouvement Libéral du Congo, led by Jean-Paul Muya, has been active in Makala. Constituted by alumni of the École Nationale d'Administration (ENA) in the DRC, the MCL aspires to bolster the commune's educational framework through targeted interventions and infrastructural enhancements.

=== Religion ===
Makala hosts a thriving religious culture, dominated by Catholicism and evangelical Christianity. The commune is home to five Catholic parishes, all affiliated with the Archdiocese of Kinshasa and organized under the Kin-Centre Apostolic Region. These parishes are distributed across two deaneries, Saint-Gabriel and Saint-Joseph.

==== In the Saint-Gabriel Deanery ====
- Sainte-Christine Parish – Established in 1963, this parish is particularly noted for its choir, founded in 1983, and its extensive outreach programs for street children.
- Saint-Mathias Parish – Created in 1961, the parish's current church building was consecrated in 1984 by Cardinal Joseph-Albert Malula.

In the Saint-Joseph Deanery:

- Sainte-Claire Parish – Officially created in 1990 following the consecration of its church on 15 October 1989, by Monsignor Tharcisse Tshibangu Tshishiku, Sainte-Claire is a more recent addition to the community.
- Saint-Clément Parish – One of the older parishes in Makala, it was established in 1960, with its first church constructed in 1965.

In addition to the Catholic community, Makala also hosts the evangelical church Église Évangélique La Belle Porte, which has been undergoing a spiritual revival since 1984.
