= Tshangu District =

- Kinshasa districts and communes, Tshangu to the east
- Coordinates: 4.420352°S 15.385494°E
- Country: DR Congo
- City-Province: Kinshasa

Tshangu is an area of the capital city of Kinshasa, Democratic Republic of the Congo, comprising five of the city-province's twenty-four administrative divisions—the communes of Kimbanseke, Maluku, Masina, Ndjili and Nsele. It is one of the four so-called districts of Kinshasa. These were the administrative divisions of Kinshasa during much of the Mobutu years (1965-1997) and around which a number of government systems and services are still organized. For instance, Tshangu makes up an eighteen-member National Assembly constituency designated as Kinshasa IV. However, these districts are not part of Congo's territorial organization.

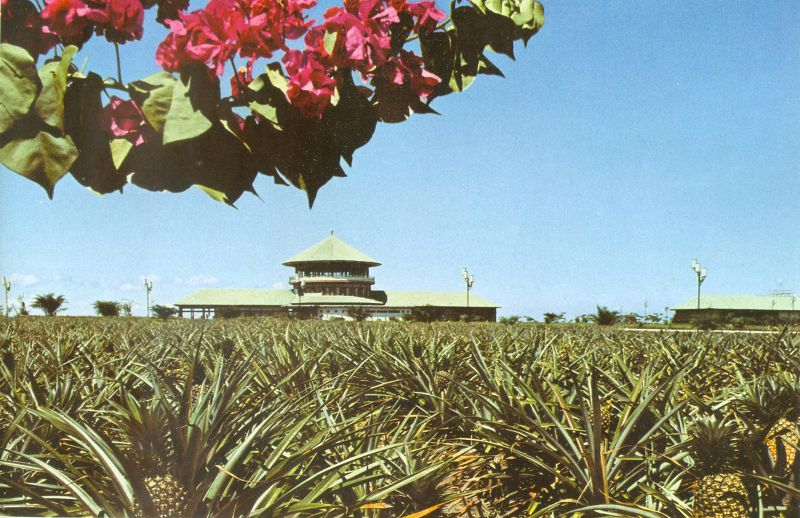
Nsele in 1974 - pinneapples
