= Masina, Kinshasa =

Masina
- Commune
- Commune de Masina
- Nickname: Chine Populaire
- Masina on map of Kinshasa city-province
- Location in DR Congo
- Coordinates: 4°21′47″S 15°23′42″E
- Country: DR Congo
- City-Province: Kinshasa

Area
  - Total: 69.7 km^{2} (26.9 sq mi)

Population (2004 est.)
  - Total: 485,167
  - Density: 6,960/km^{2} (18,000/sq mi)

Masina is a municipality (commune) in the Tshangu District of Kinshasa, the capital city of the Democratic Republic of the Congo.

It is bordered by the Pool Malebo in the north and Boulevard Lumbumba to the south.

Masina shelters within it the Marché de la Liberté "M’Zee Laurent-Désiré Kabila”, one of the largest markets of Kinshasa, which was built under the presidency of Laurent-Désiré Kabila to repay the inhabitants of the district of Tshangu who had resisted the rebels in August 1998.

The area is known by the nickname "Chine Populaire" ("People's China").

== Geography ==
Masina, together with the communes of Ndjili and Kimbanseke, belong to the district of Tshangu 20 km east of central Kinshasa.

Most of the municipality is occupied by a wetland bordering the Pool Malebo, which explains the low population density relative of the municipality. The urban area, stretching along Boulevard Lumumba, however, reaches population densities comparable to those of other municipalities in the heart of Kinshasa (about 50,000 inhabitants per km^{2}).
