= Maluku, Kinshasa =

Maluku
- Commune
- Commune de Maluku
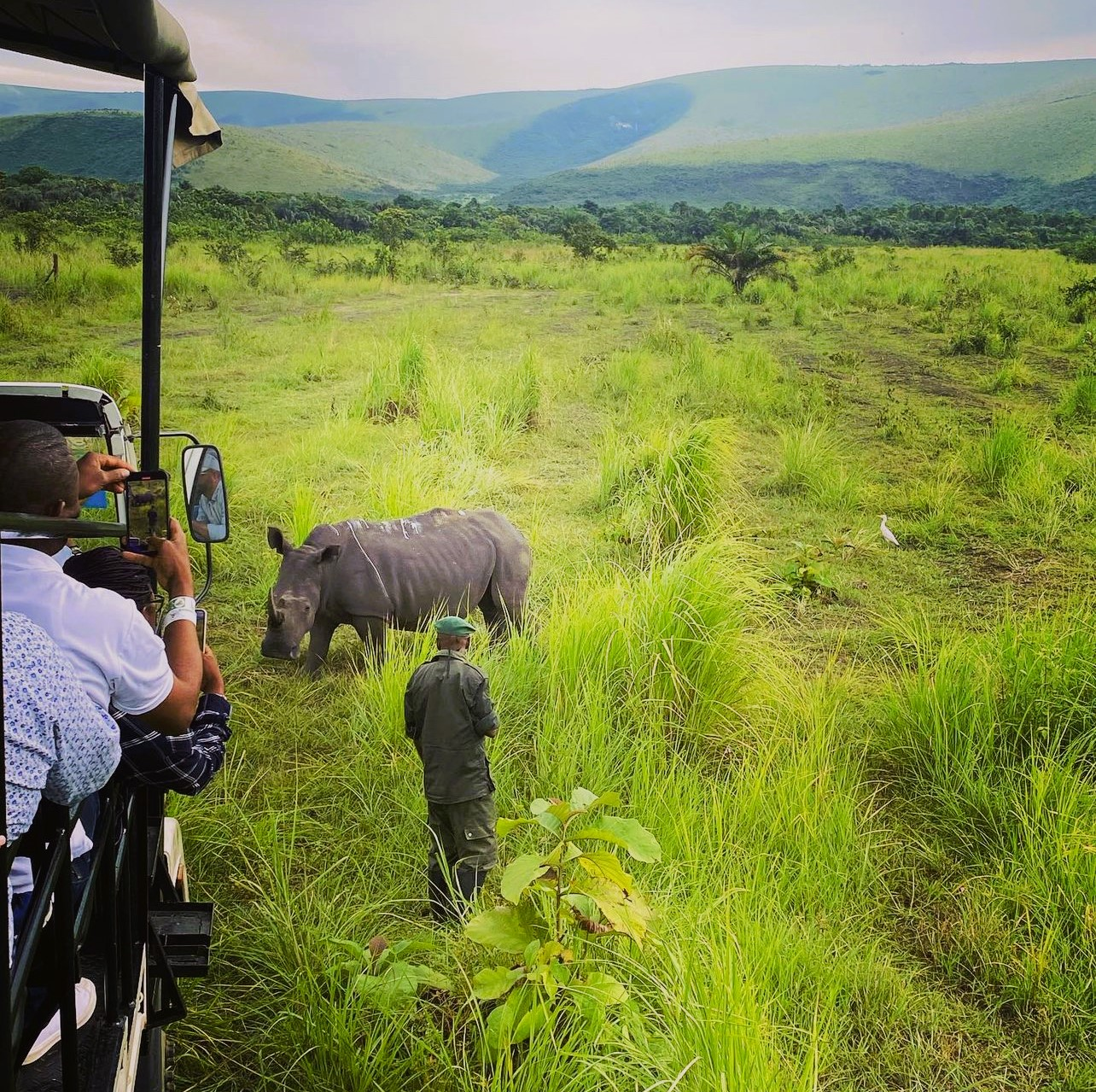
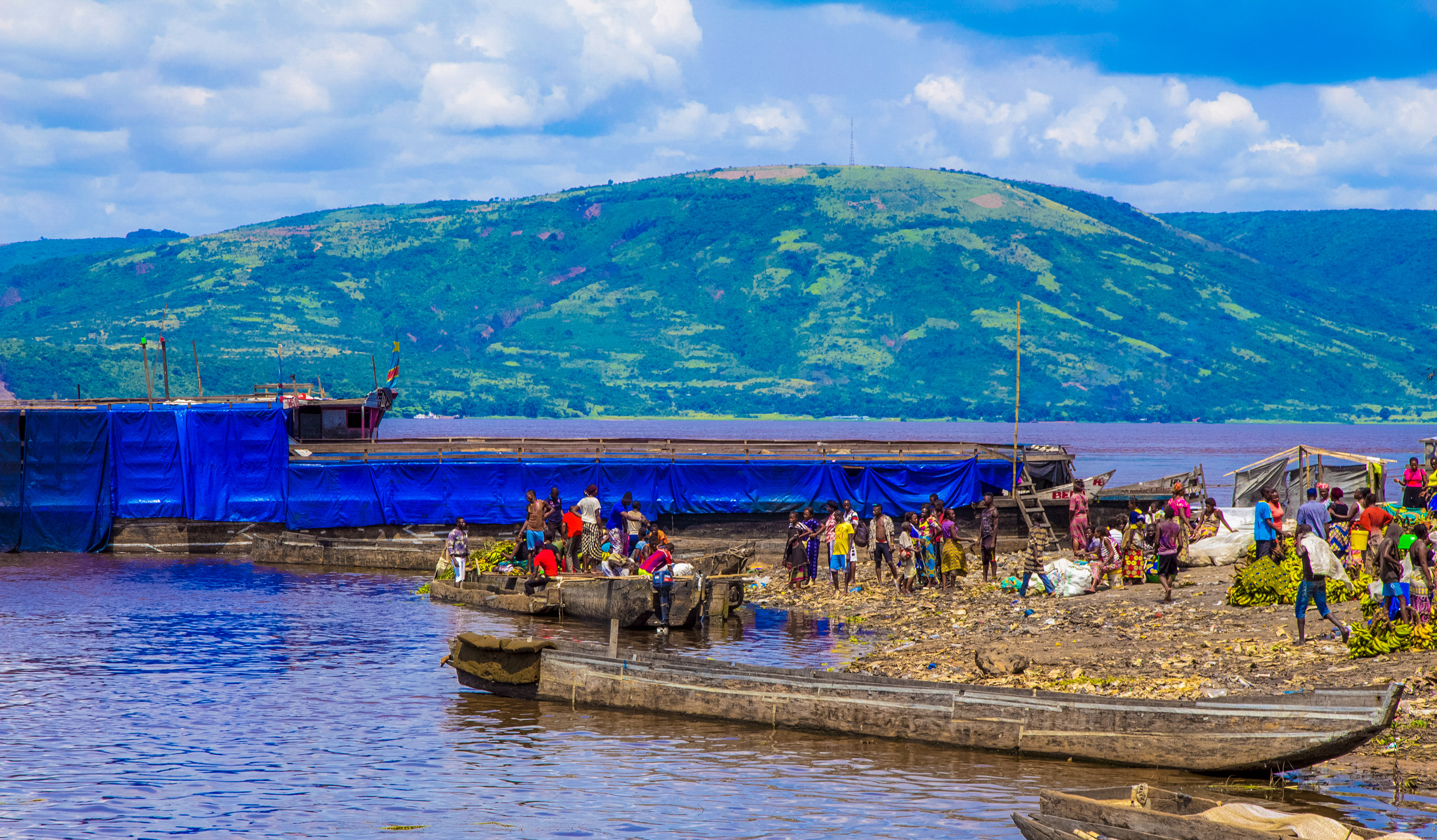
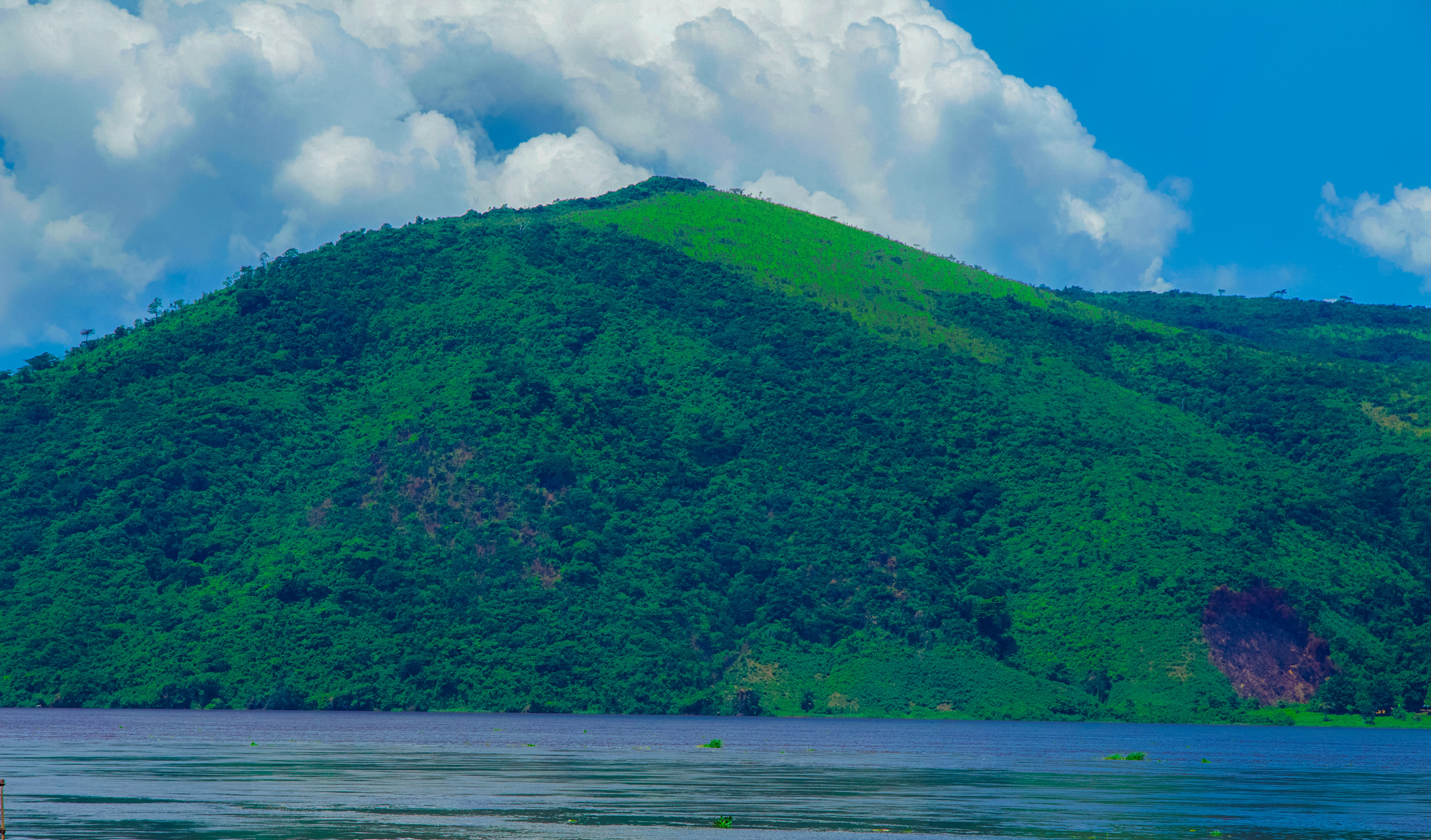
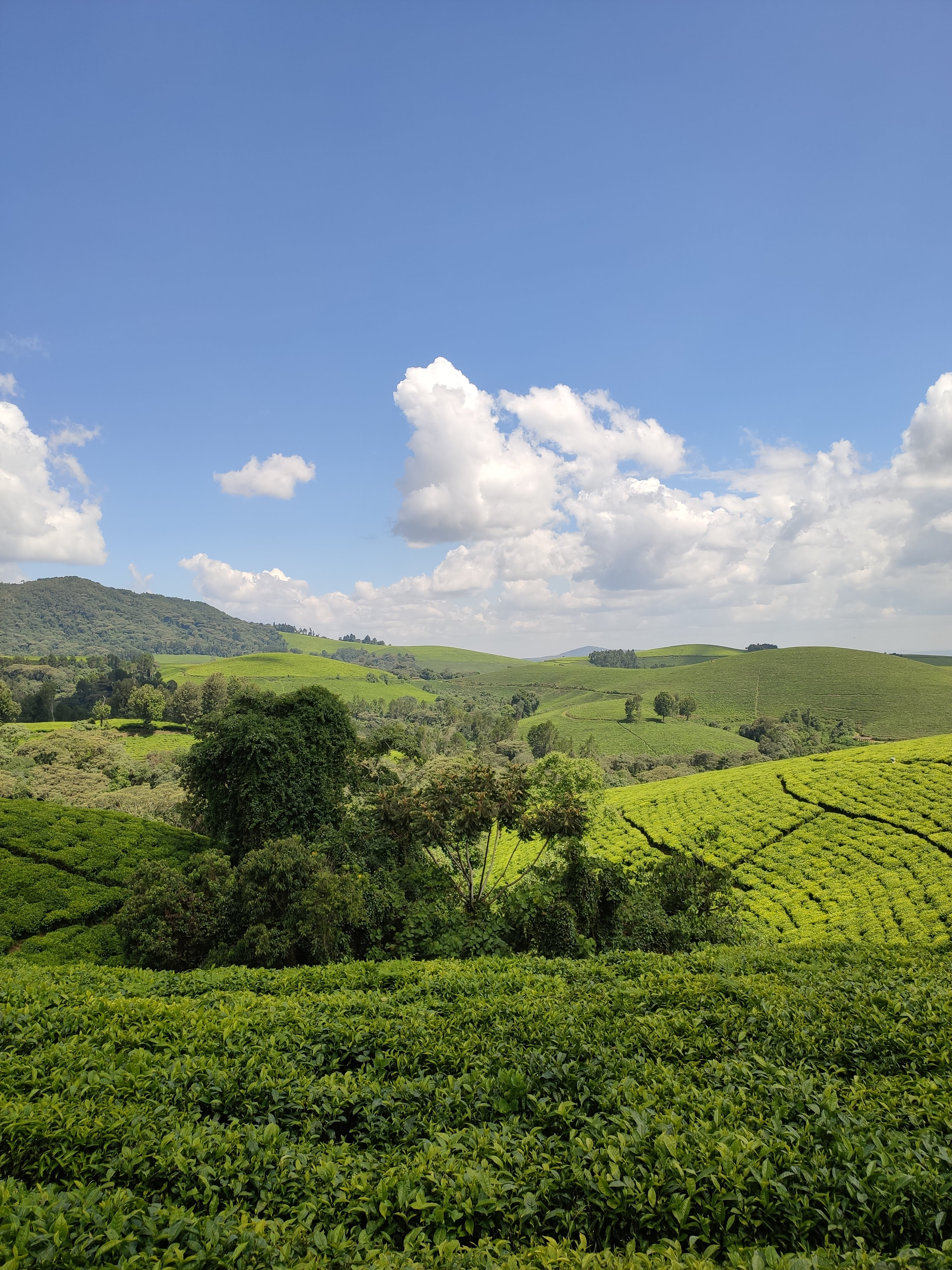
- Maluku on map of Kinshasa city-province
- Location in DR Congo
- Coordinates: 4°27′41″S 16°04′43″E
- Country: DR Congo
- City-Province: Kinshasa

Area
  - Total: 7,948.8 km^{2} (3,069.0 sq mi)

Population (2004 est.)
  - Total: 179,648
  - Density: 22.601/km^{2} (58.535/sq mi)

Maluku is one of the 24 communes that are the administrative divisions of Kinshasa, the capital city of the Democratic Republic of the Congo. This eastern rural commune accounts for 79% of the land area of the city-province, but only 4% of its population.

The Nsele Wildlife Reserve, located within the commune, provides a protected area for wildlife, including various species of primates, birds, African bush elephants, hippopotamus, giraffes, rhinos, lions, zebras, giant pangolins and other animals.
