= Matete =

- Commune
- Commune de Matete
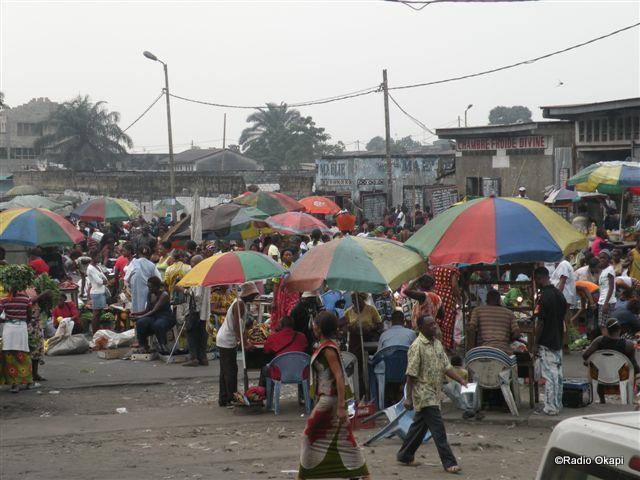
- Matete Market
- Matete on map of Kinshasa city-province
- Location in DR Congo
- Coordinates: 4°23′20″S 15°21′6″E
- Country: DR Congo
- City-Province: Kinshasa

Government
  - Burgomaster: Jules Mukumbi
  - PD: Joseph Malungeni Makengo

Area
  - Total: 4.80 km^{2} (1.85 sq mi)

Population (2015 est.)
  - Total: 854,908
  - Density: 178,000/km^{2} (461,000/sq mi)

Matete is one of the 24 communes of Kinshasa, the capital city of the Democratic Republic of the Congo. Situated in the Mont Amba District in the southern part of Kinshasa, Matete spans an area of 4.80 square kilometers and had an estimated population of 854,908 as of 2015. It shares borders with the communes of Lemba and Limete to the north, Kisenso to the south, N'djili to the east, and Lemba to the west.

The commune hosts the Marché de Matete, Kinshasa's third-largest shopping center, which serves as a key economic hub. As a decentralized administrative entity, Matete receives state subsidies and taxes collected from the market.

== Location ==
Matete is located south of Boulevard Lumumba (RN1) from the Matete River, just east of the Limete Tower interchange, to the Ndjili River further east. The two rivers are the western and eastern boundaries of the commune. In the west the commune extends south to the level of Rue Frontière and in the east down to the level of Mbamba Kilenda street.

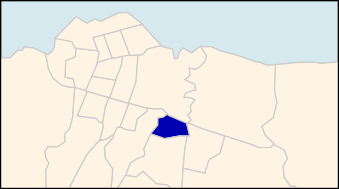
Matete on map of city communes

Matete's neighboring communes going clockwise from the south are: Kisenso, Lemba, Limete, and Ndjili.

== Government ==
The administration of Matete is led by an unelected government appointed burgomaster (French: bourgmestre). As of 2023 the burgomaster is Jules Mukumbi. The reform of having burgomasters elected by communal councils awaits the inaugural election of these councils.

=== Electoral district ===
With 134,452 on its voter rolls Matete is an electoral district for both the election of a nine-member communal council and that of a deputy of the Provincial Assembly of Kinshasa. The council election is by open list. For the National Assembly Matete is part of the Kinshasa III district (Mont Amba).

Nationwide communal council elections were scheduled for 22 September 2019 but did not take place. In December of that year President Tshisekedi declared that these elections would be held sometime in 2020.

The Provincial Assembly election was held as part of the general elections on 30 December 2018. Joseph Malungeni Makengo (MLC) is the deputy representing Matete in the new legislature.

=== Administrative divisions ===
In 2014 the numerous neighborhoods of Matete were divided among the following 13 quarters (French: quartiers): (Note: In addition to this administrative meaning, quartier can also simply mean a neighborhood of which Matete has 39–54 depending on the source.)

- Dondo
- Loeka
- Lubefu
- Lukunga
- Lumumba
- Lunionzo
- Malemba
- Maziba
- Mbomb'Ipoku
- Sankuru
- Sumbuka
- Totaka
- Vivi

Each of these is managed by a quarter chief.

== History ==
Matete is intrinsically linked to its namesake, the Matete River, which originates from Mont Amba. Initially established in 1953 as an annexed territory of Léopoldville (modern-day Kinshasa), the commune was governed by a customary chief from the Bantu-speaking Humbu ethnic group, specifically Chief Molo.

In 1954, Matete was formally designated as a suburban territory of Léopoldville through Decree No. 221/611, promulgated on 27 December 1954, by the Governor of the Province of Léopoldville. At the time, the territory fell under the jurisdiction of the district commissioner of Moyen-Congo (Middle Congo), who acted as the representative of the colonial administration. A year later, on 26 December 1955, Ntetu Joseph was appointed head of the suburban territory of Matete by decision No. 269/001/ccd.

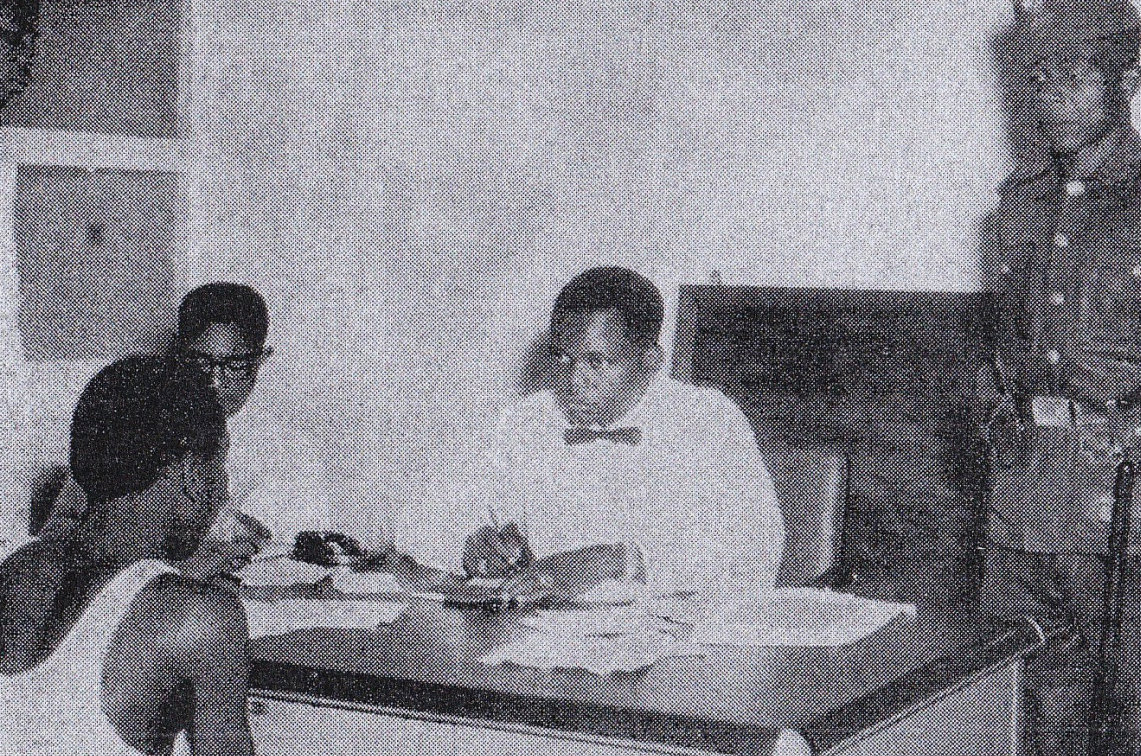
Joseph Mbungu, mayor of Matete, interviews individuals suspected of involvement in the Léopoldville riots, ca. January 1959

Matete's significance grew with the issuance of Order No. 338 on 28 March 1956, which recognized the area as an important center due to the construction of 6,000 housing units by Pierre Vigny's company. This rapid expansion led to Matete being elevated to the status of an urban commune within Léopoldville in 1959. Following the first municipal elections held on 2 February 1953, Mbungu Jean became the first elected Mayor of Matete.

In the post-colonial era, Matete was restructured under Decree-Law No. 098/081 of 2 July 1998, which established it as a decentralized territorial and administrative entity with legal personality.

== Health ==
The Matete urban health zone is one of the 35 health zones (zones de santé, ZS) within the city province of Kinshasa, and borders the health zones of Kisenso, Lemba, Kingabwa, and Ndjili. The zone is subdivided into 13 health areas: Dondo, Loeka, Lukunga, Lumumba, Lunionzo, Malemba, Maziba, Mbomb'ipoko, Sankuru, Sumbuka, Totaka, and Vivi. It encompasses 93 health structures, of which 46 actively collaborate with the health zone and submit monthly reports to the Bureau Central de Zone de Santé (BCZS) through the Système National d'Information Sanitaire (SNIS). Among these health facilities, there are three state-run establishments, including two health centers and one Hôpital Général de Référence (General Reference Hospital). The remaining structures consist of two Catholic-approved facilities, two Protestant-approved facilities, and several private establishments.

The primary health issues in the Matete health zone include malaria, acute respiratory infections, malnutrition, diarrhea, measles, and gastroenteritis. The health zone reflects an urban-rural lifestyle and is home to a diverse mix of ethnic groups, including the Bangala, Baswahili, Baluba, and Bakongo. Lingala is the most widely spoken language in the area. The commune also has a variety of religious communities, including Catholic, Protestant, Kimbanguist, Salvation Army, and Revival Churches.

Educational infrastructure in the health zone includes 42 primary schools, 22 private secondary schools, and 15 Catholic schools. Additionally, the zone is served by 10 official schools, 3 Kimbanguist schools, and 1 Salvation Army school. The region also boasts two Medical Technical Institutes (Instituts Techniques Médicaux; ITMs) and a Presbyterian Higher Institute of Medical Techniques (Institut Supérieur des Techniques Médicales; ISTM).

== Notable people ==
- Edingwe Moto Na Ngenge, professional wrestler
- Kembo Uba Kembo, professional football player
- Marc Mbombo, athlete and Taekwondo practitioner
- Félix Wazekwa, singer-songwriter, author, and filmmaker
- Moise Mbiye, gospel singer-songwriter
- Gaz Fabilouss, rapper, producer, and record executive
- Fabregas Le Métis Noirs, singer-songwriter
