= Limete =

- Commune
- Commune de Limete
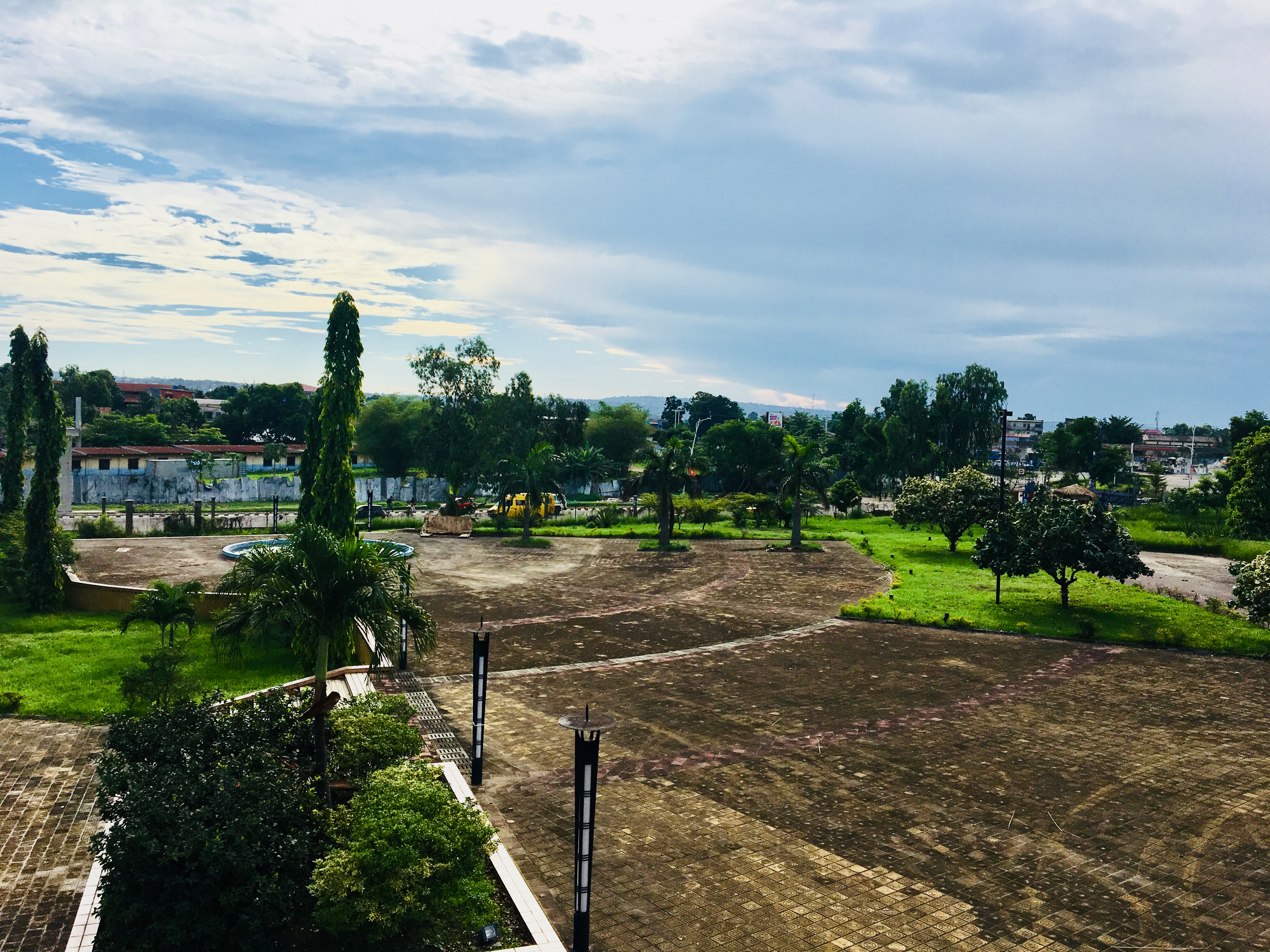
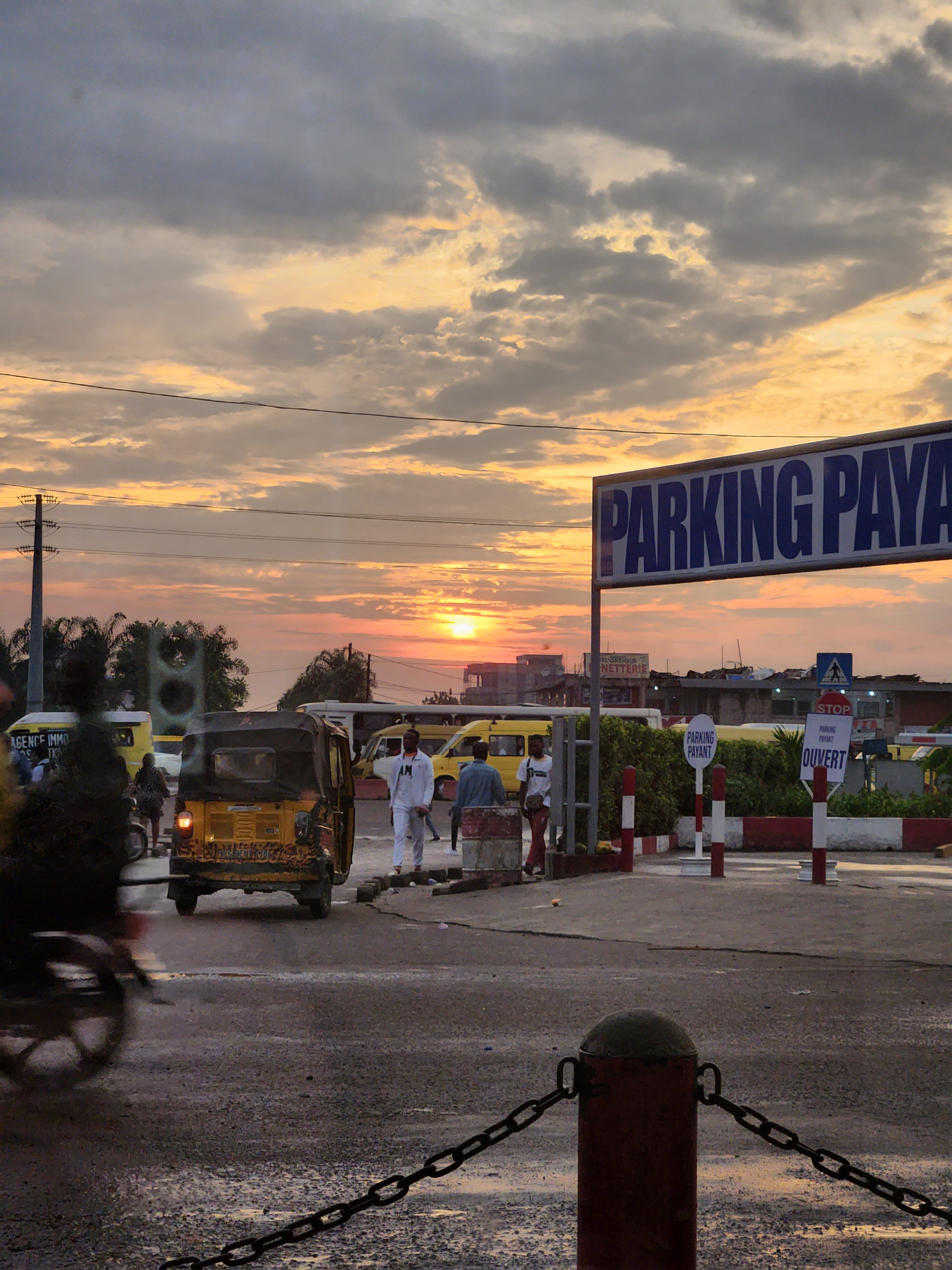
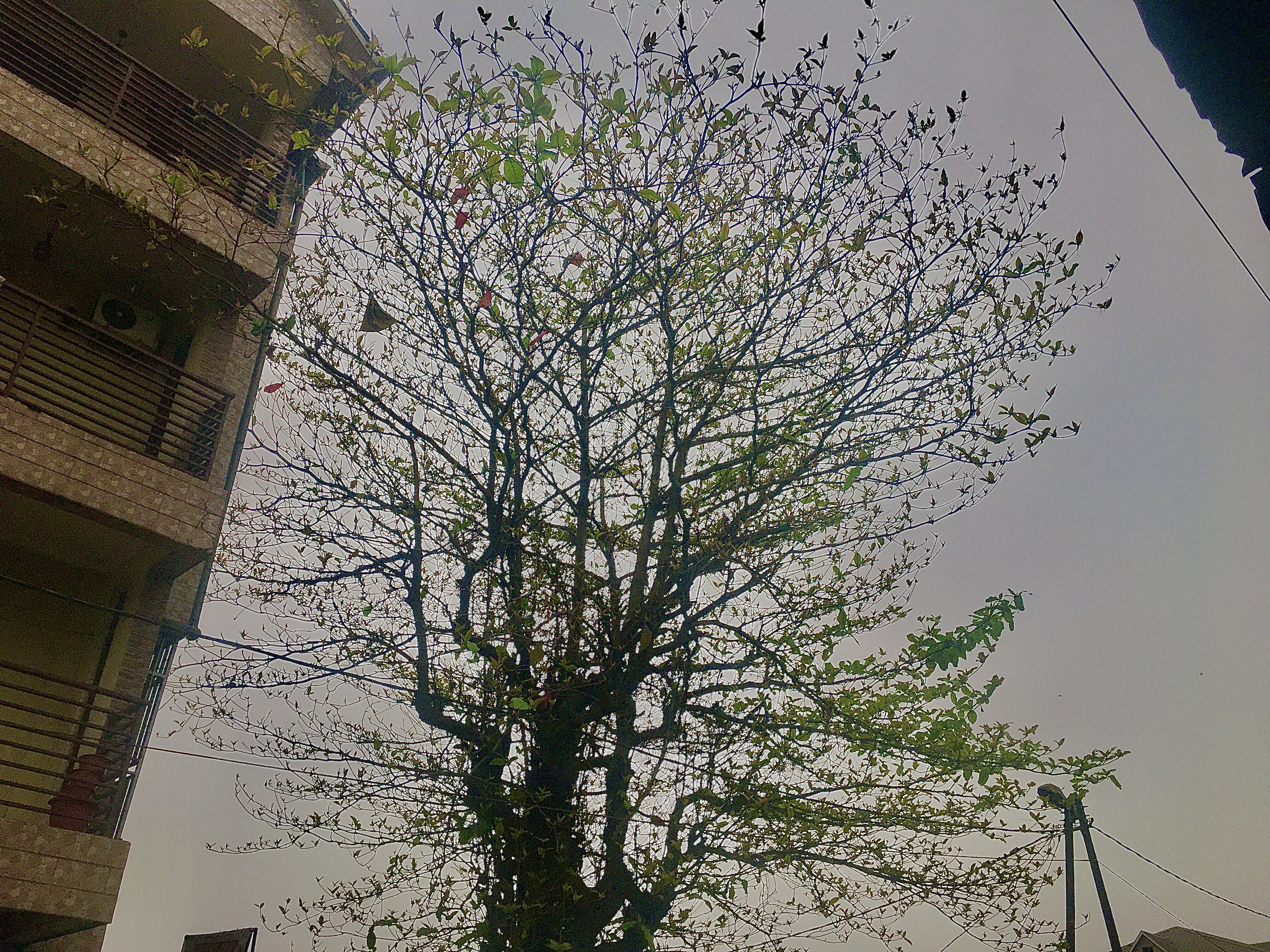
- Limete on map of Kinshasa city-province
- Location in DR Congo
- Coordinates: 4°21′0″S 15°21′4″E
- Country: DR Congo
- City-Province: Kinshasa

Government
  - Burgomaster: Nathalie Alamba
  - PDs: Therese Masengo Muabuanga; Jean Désiré Mbonzi Wa Mbonzi; Gerard Mulumba Kongolo Wa Kongolo

Area
  - Total: 67.6 km^{2} (26.1 sq mi)

Population (2018 est.)
  - Total: 1,321,274
  - Density: 19,500/km^{2} (50,600/sq mi)

Limete is one of the 24 communes of Kinshasa, located in the eastern part of the city between Pool Malebo along its southwestern shoreline and Boulevard Lumumba. At its creation, the commune covered 23.78 square kilometers and later expanded to 67.60 square kilometers following Ordinance-Law No. 68-018 of 2 December 1968. It is bordered by Barumbu to the north, Matete and Lemba to the south, Masina to the east, and Kalamu and Makala to the west. Limete had an estimated population of 375,726 people as of 2014, including 372,261 nationals and 3,465 foreigners. By 2018, the population had increased to 1,321,274, including 1,315,041 nationals and 6,233 foreigners.

The commune is administratively divided into 14 quarters (quartiers). French serves as the official administrative language, while Lingala is the predominant national language in daily communication. The main ethnic groups include Luba, Mongo, Kongo, Suku, Teke, Tetela, and Yaka.

== Geography ==
Limete lies on a sandy and marshy plain interspersed with patches of woodland. The commune is located south of the Pool Malebo between the mouths of the Funa and Ndjili rivers. The eastern boundary is the Ndjili going south down to Boulevard Lumumba (RN1). The western boundary from the north follows the Funa, Boulevard Lumumba, and Avenue de L'Université down to Avenue Kikwit. From there the southern boundary rejoins Boulevard Lumumba to the east via Avenue Sefu and the Limete Tower interchange.

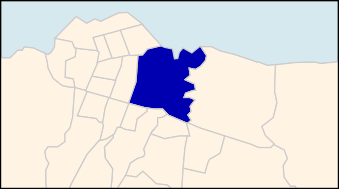
Limete on map of city communes

Limete has a tropical climate with notable rainfall, with precipitation occurring fairly consistently throughout the year. The Kingabwa area, situated along the Congo River, has distinctive climatic conditions due to its proximity to the river. Like Kinshasa and the rest of the Democratic Republic of the Congo, Limete experiences two main seasons: a dry season and a rainy season.

Hydrographically, Limete is intersected or bordered by several waterways, most notably the Funa River, Congo River, Matete River, N'djili River, and Yolo River. Five of its quartiers, like Kingabwa, Mbamu, Nzadi, Ndanu, and Salongo, lie within the N'djili River basin and therefore often experience flooding, with Kingabwa being the most exposed and facing the highest level of flood risk.

== Demographics ==
=== Population ===
Limete is home to a diverse and heterogeneous population composed of nationals and foreigners from various ethnic and national backgrounds. The principal ethnic groups include the Luba, Mongo, Kongo, Suku, Teke, Tetela, and Yaka. French is used as the official language of administration, while Lingala serves as the main national language of daily communication. Other national languages are also spoken within the commune.

In 2013, the total population was 250,183, with nationals making up 248,402 (99.3%) and foreigners 1,781 (0.7%). In 2014, the population was estimated at 375,726, including 372,261 nationals and 3,465 foreigners. By 2018, according to municipal records, the population had risen to 1,321,274, including 1,315,041 nationals and 6,233 foreigners.

== History ==
During the colonial era, the capital of the Belgian Congo was known as Léopoldville (now Kinshasa). As independence drew nearer, the city underwent rapid expansion driven by a growing rural exodus, with large numbers of people leaving the countryside for the capital. At the same time, increasing political pressure for independence weakened colonial authority, which gradually lost its ability to regulate this population movement as effectively as before. Léopoldville consequently experienced a sharp rise in population, which prompted colonial administrators to look for ways to ease the strain on what had become a highly centralized system of governance.

The colonial administration adopted a policy of expanding the city's administrative structure and that of other fast-growing urban areas to bring governance closer to the population through a more efficient and responsive system. As part of this reform, several communes were established in major cities to decentralize administration and respond to the growing desire among Congolese to manage their own national affairs. Limete was created in this context in 1958 through a decree-law issued by Governor-General Durkheim, who represented the King of Belgium in the colony. The king remained in Belgium, while the Governor-General operated from the colonial capital. Like other communes in Kinshasa, Limete is governed under Decree-Laws No. 131/97 of 8 October 1997 and No. 081/98 of 2 July 1998, which revised earlier ordinances concerning the country's territorial administration and the status of Kinshasa.

== Government ==
The administration of Limete is led by an unelected government appointed burgomaster (French: bourgmestre). As of 2023 the burgomaster is Nathalie Alamba. The reform of having burgomasters elected by communal councils awaits the inaugural election of these councils.

=== Electoral district ===
With 295,768 on its voter rolls Limete is an electoral district for both the election of a thirteen-member communal council and that of three deputies of the Provincial Assembly of Kinshasa. Both elections are by open list. For the National Assembly Limete is part of the Kinshasa III district (Mont Amba).

Nationwide communal council elections were scheduled for 22 September 2019 but did not take place. In December of that year President Tshisekedi declared that these elections would be held sometime in 2020.

The Provincial Assembly election was held as part of the general elections on 30 December 2018. Therese Masengo Muabuanga (UDPS/Tshisekedi), Jean Désiré Mbonzi Wa Mbonzi (MLC), and Gerard Mulumba Kongolo Wa Kongolo (UDPS/Tshisekedi) are the deputies representing Limete in the new legislature.

=== Administrative divisions ===
In 2014 Limete was divided into the following 14 quarters (French: quartiers):

- Agricole
- Industriel
- Kingabwa
- Masiala (Général Masiala)
- Mateba
- Mayulu
- Mbamu
- Mfumu-Mvula
- Mombele
- Mososo
- Ndanu
- Nzadi
- Residentiel
- Salongo

== Economy ==
It has an agro-industrial vocation and hosts several industries, most of which are located in the Industriel and Kingabwa quartiers. Many of the port facilities of the city-province of Kinshasa are also found in Limete.

Limete features several notable attractions, such as the Limete Interchange (L'échangeur de Limete) and the Kinshasa International Fair (Foire internationale de Kinshasa; FIKIN), whose main entrance is situated on the Lemba side.
