= Kimbanseke =

- Commune
- Commune de Kimbanseke
- Kinshasa city-province on map of DR Congo
- Location in DR Congo
- Coordinates: 4°26′31″S 15°23′42″E
- Country: DR Congo
- City-Province: Kinshasa

Area
  - Total: 237.78 km^{2} (91.81 sq mi)

Population (2004 est.)
  - Total: 946,372
  - Density: 3,980.0/km^{2} (10,308/sq mi)
- Website: www.kimbanseke.cd

Kimbanseke is a municipality (commune) in the Tshangu district of Kinshasa, the capital city of the Democratic Republic of the Congo.

It is situated in the southeast of Kinshasa. Settlement in this hilled area is relatively new.
