= Kisenso =

- Commune
- Commune de Kisenso
- Kisenso on map of Kinshasa city-province
- Location in DR Congo
- Coordinates: 4°24′34″S 15°20′33″E
- Country: DR Congo
- City-Province: Kinshasa

Area
  - Total: 16.6 km^{2} (6.4 sq mi)

Population (2004 est.)
  - Total: 386,151
  - Density: 23,300/km^{2} (60,200/sq mi)

Kisenso (Lingala: Kinsénso) is a municipality (commune) in the Mont Amba district of Kinshasa, the capital city of the Democratic Republic of the Congo.

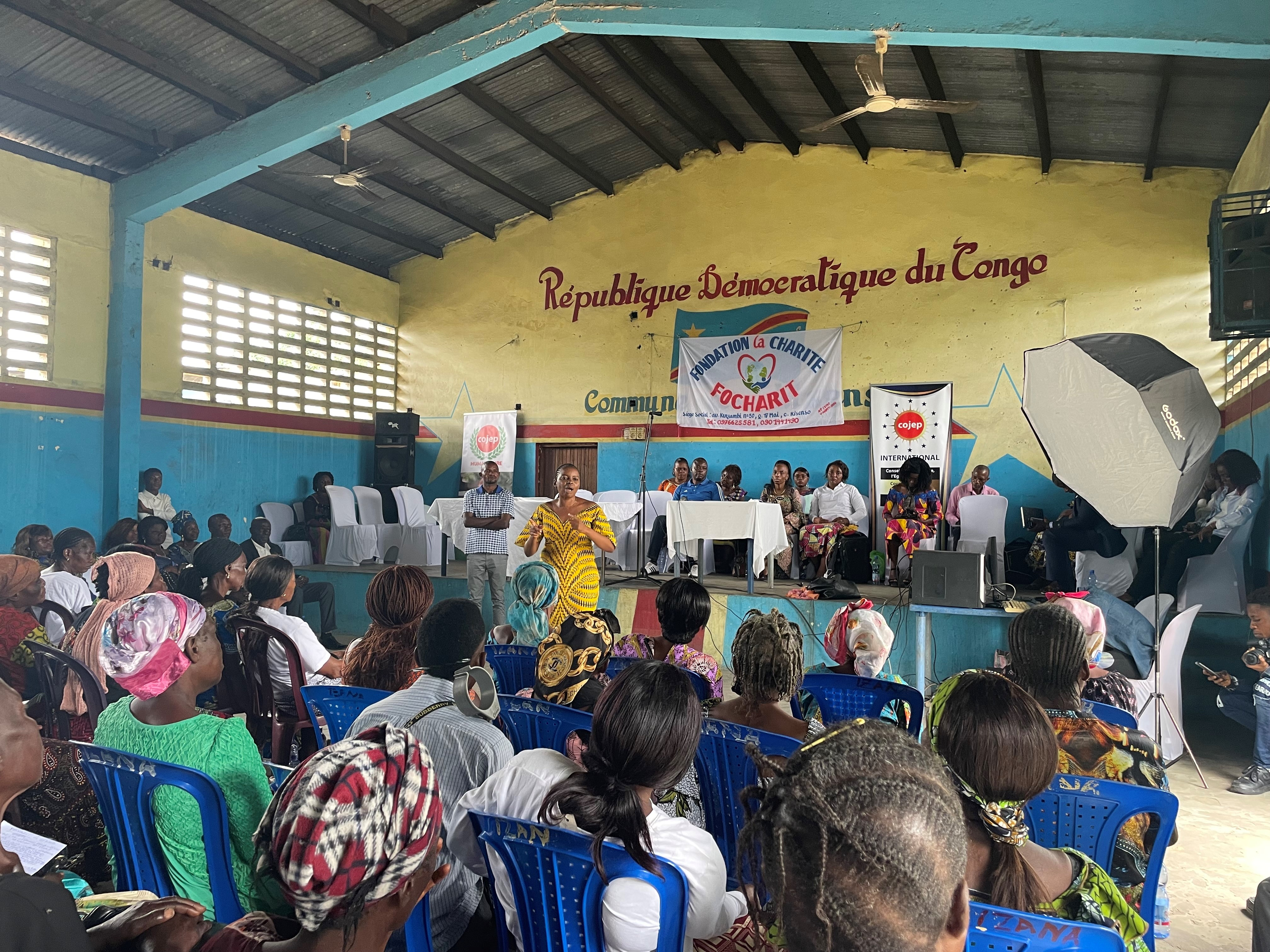
Women in peace building, Ki(n)senso, March 2022
