= Selembao =

- Commune
- Commune de Selembao
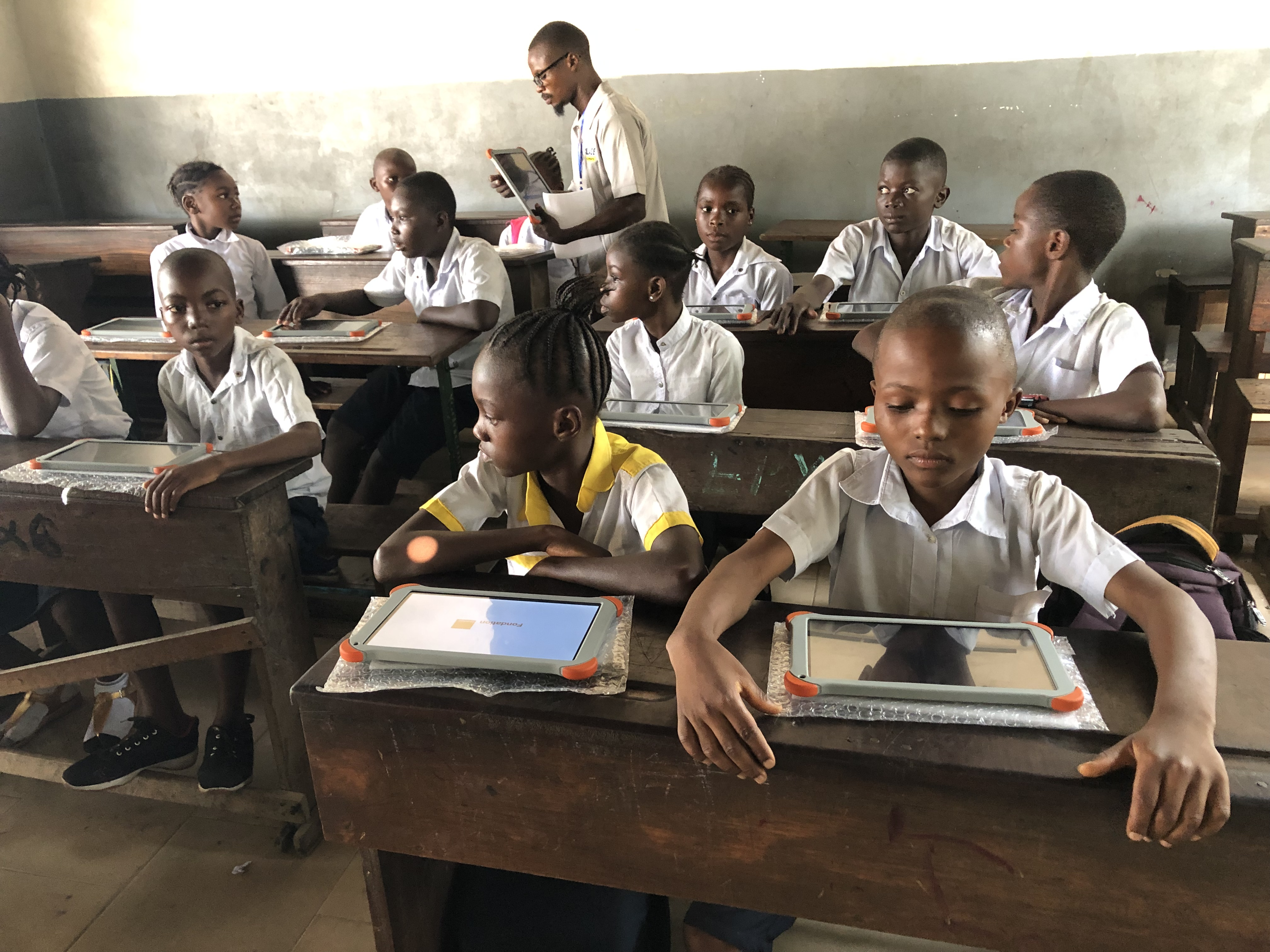
- Students in a classroom in Selembao
- Selembao on map of Kinshasa city-province
- Location in DR Congo
- Coordinates: 4°22′15″S 15°17′12″E
- Country: DR Congo
- City-Province: Kinshasa

Area
  - Total: 23.2 km^{2} (9.0 sq mi)

Population (2015 est.)
  - Total: 1,038,819
  - Density: 44,800/km^{2} (116,000/sq mi)

Selembao is one of the 24 communes that are the administrative divisions of Kinshasa, the capital city of the Democratic Republic of the Congo. Covering over 23.2 square kilometers and with an estimated population of 1,038,819 as of 2015, it is bordered to the north by the communes of Bandalungwa and Bumbu, to the northeast by Bumbu, to the south by Mont Ngafula, to the east by Makala, and to the west by Ngaliema.

Administratively divided into 18 quartiers, Selembao's urban development is largely unplanned, with most areas lacking basic infrastructure such as transportation networks, electricity, water systems, and adequate drainage. While some southern quartiers, like Cité Verte, benefit from structured roadways and functional sewer networks, the preponderance of the commune remains underdeveloped. The degradation of key infrastructure and the formation of erosional ravines have led to significant challenges, including the silting of rivers, damage to homes, and loss of lives, with approximately 150 fatalities reported between 1970 and 2010 due to these issues. Intensive urban agriculture, small-scale livestock husbandry, and micro-enterprises are Selembao's most significant revenue-generating and economic sectors.

Selembao has undergone substantial demographic expansion, with an average annual growth rate of 5% between 1984 and 2004, exerting immense pressure on housing availability. Consequently, urbanization has encroached into steep valleys and other marginal lands, filling previously undeveloped spaces.

== Geography ==
=== Relief ===
The commune's topography is predominantly rugged, with numerous steep slopes defining quartiers such as Inga, Madiata, and Nkingu. The northern section, however, serves as an extension of the Bandalungwa commune and features a relatively gentler slope. Erosion poses a significant environmental challenge in Selembao, manifesting in the collapse of streets into ravines, destabilization of building foundations, and exposure of previously buried infrastructure, including REGIDESO water pipes and electric poles elevated nearly two meters above the ground.

=== Hydrology ===
The Bumbu River serves as the primary watercourse in Selembao. Originating at an altitude of approximately 345 meters, the river spans a length of 11 kilometers before merging with the Funa River in the Kalamu commune. With an average flow rate of 15 meters per second, the Bumbu River is fed by 24 tributaries, some of which are seasonal. Its hydrological characteristics reflect those of tropical rivers in the southern hemisphere, with distinct periods of flooding and low water levels. During the rainy season, the river's valley becomes marshy, indicating a water table near the surface. However, the river's main channel lacks a clear definition, and its course is often shaped by sediment deposition during heavy rains.

=== Vegetation ===
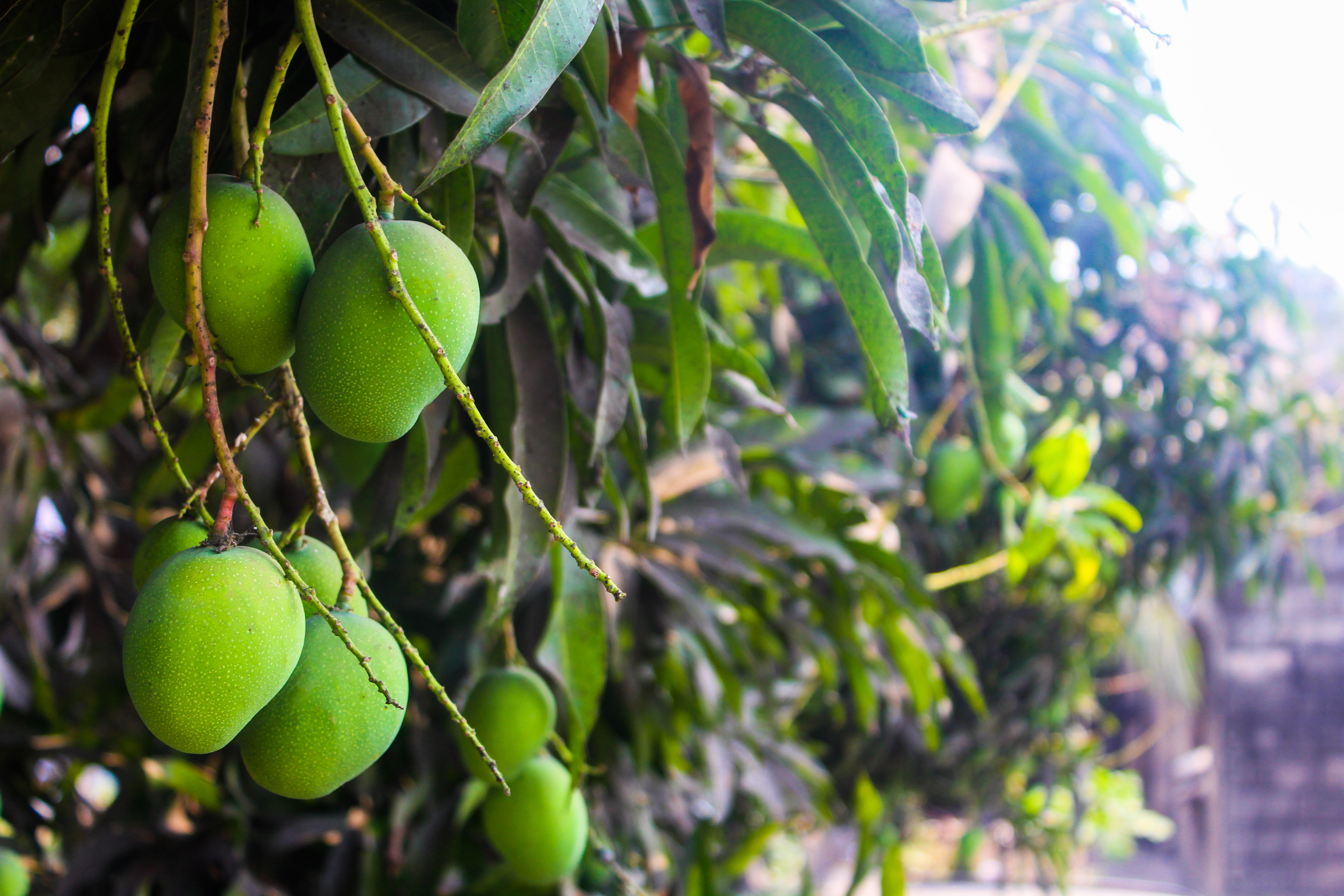
A mango tree in Selembao

Urbanization has profoundly altered Selembao's vegetation, leading to the near-total eradication of its indigenous plant cover. Historically, Kinshasa's vegetation reflected characteristics of the Guinean forest and Zambezian savannah, as described by researchers like Fluriot J. and Van Caillié Xavier. These ecosystems, influenced by the Benguela current, were capable of mitigating erosion. However, rapid urban expansion has replaced much of the native flora with secondary growth and open savannah. Remnants of natural vegetation, such as the shrub and herbaceous layers, persist in steep, less accessible areas like the slopes near the Bumbu River source. Notable species include Syzygium macrocarpum, Hymenocardia acida, Annona carysophyllas, and Strychnos pungens, along with grasses like Hyparrhenia, Sporobolus, Rhynchelytrum, and Digitaria.

=== Geology ===
Geologically, Selembao lies within the hilly terrain of Kinshasa, underlain by formations described by Van Caillié Xavier. These layers, from top to bottom, include reworked sandy deposits, kaolinitic clayey sands, polymorphic sandstones, soft white or pink sandstones, and altered sandstone schists belonging to the Inkisi series. The commune's soils are predominantly composed of fine sands with a minimal silt fraction.

=== Administrative division ===
Established as an autonomous commune by Ordinance-Law No. 68-24 of 20 January 1968, Selembao's administrative framework was further defined by ministerial decree No. 69/042 of 23 January 1969. Governed under Decree-Law No. 081 of 2 July 1998, with amendments in 2001, the commune is subdivided into 18 quartiers (quarters), which are further divided into avenues. These quartiers operate as administrative units without autonomous legal standing.

==== Quartiers ====
- Badiandingi
- Cité Verte
- Inga
- Kalunga
- Konde
- Ndobe
- Lubudi
- Madiata
- Nkingu
- Molende
- Konde
- Muana-Tunu
- Ngafani
- Mbala
- Herady
- Liberation
- Nkulu
- Pululu-Mbambu

== History ==
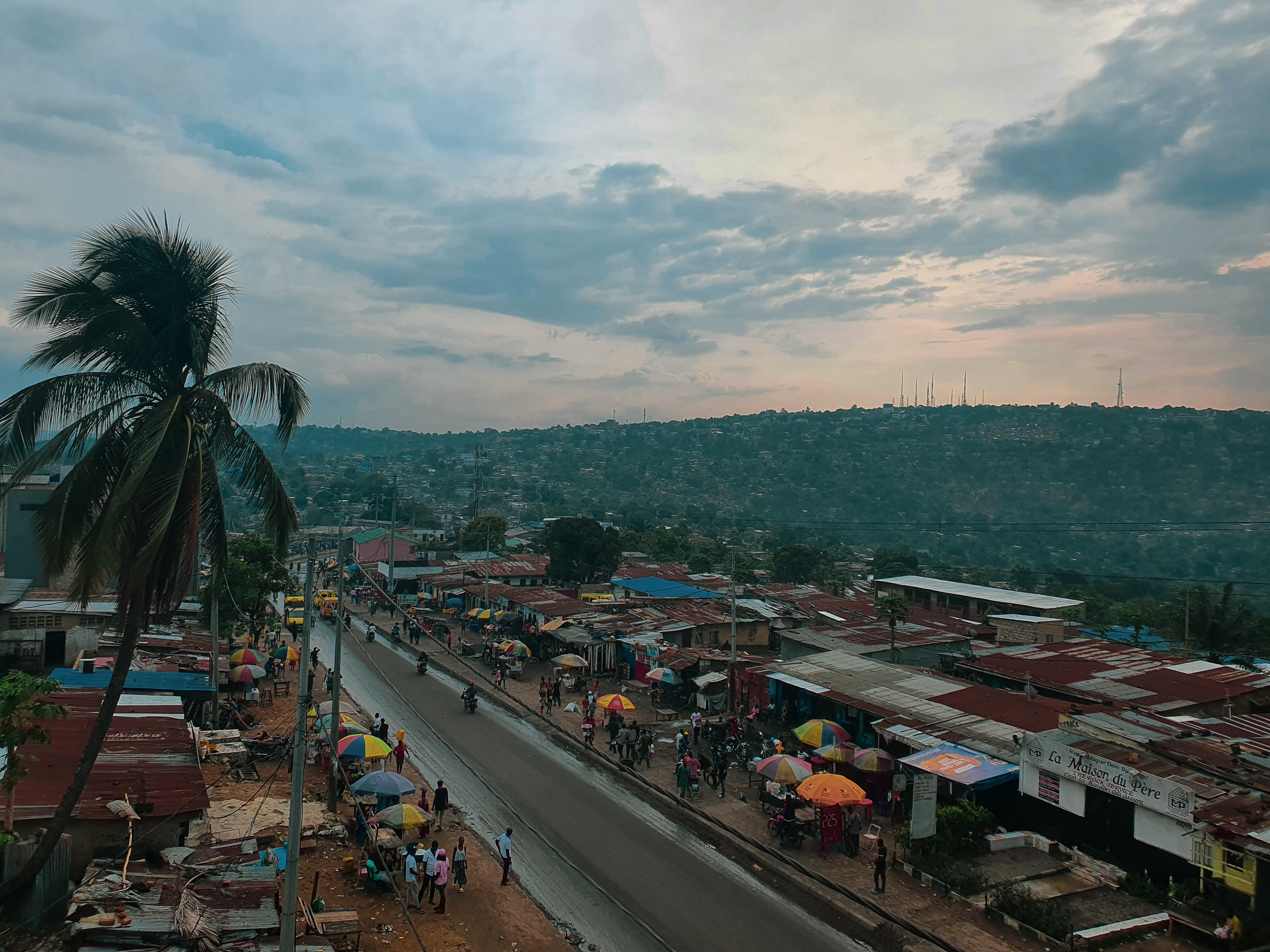
A roadside view of Selembao on National Road No. 1 (RN1)

The name Selembao originates from Selembao, a member of the Humbu ethnic group from the village of Ngombe near Lutendele in what is now the commune of Mont Ngafula. Known for his insolence and energetic disposition, Selembao was a celebrated fisherman. In the 19th century, he left his family and village to settle on the banks of the Nzadi River, now the Congo River, near the site of the present-day Centre Congolais du Commerce International (C.C.I.C.) building. Here, he founded a village called Nkulu and was later joined by fellow villagers, including his grandson Lingwala Ngambo, to whom he allocated land near the present-day locations of CHANIMetal and UTEXAFRICA. The community faced a major setback when an epidemic of sleeping sickness, caused by tsetse flies, devastated Nkulu, claiming many lives. In response, Selembao's associate, Ngafula Jean, relocated to land owned by his father-in-law, Molio Antio. Persistent outbreaks forced further relocations; Lingwala Ngambo moved north to an area now part of Bandalungwa, while Selembao resettled his Nkulu village farther south. Despite these challenges, Selembao remained a central figure, and European explorers seeking him eventually found him with his brother-in-law Ngafula Jean. Selembao died in 1920 at the age of 120. He was interred in the original site of his Nkulu village, where the C.C.I.C. building now stands.

=== Transition to an autonomous commune ===
Initially classified as an annexed administrative zone under the jurisdiction of Kimwenza, part of the Bas-Congo Province, Selembao gained autonomous status in 1968. Ordinance Law No. 68-24 of 20 January 1968, reorganized the city of Kinshasa, establishing Selembao as an independent commune. This administrative change was formalized by ministerial decree No. 69/042 of 23 January 1969, which defined the names and boundaries of Kinshasa's communes.

== Demographics ==
Selembao is a densely populated commune, characterized by significant population growth over recent years. The population was recorded at 216,484 in 2007, increased to 442,981 by 2011, and was estimated at approximately 1,038,819 in 2015, making it one of the most densely communes within the city.

Historical population
| Year | 1967 | 1970 | 1984 | 2003 | 2004 |
| Pop. | 55,150 | 46,908 | 126,589 | 324,534 | 335,581 |
| ±% | — | −14.9% | +169.9% | +156.4% | +3.4% |

=== Health ===
Health services in Selembao are organized under the Urban Health Zone of Selembao (Zone de Santé Urbaine de Selembao), which operates within the framework of the national primary health care policy. The zone's mission is to ensure geographic and economic accessibility to medical care for the entire population. Oversight is provided by a Chief Medical Officer (Médecin Chef de Zone), supported by a multidisciplinary Health Zone Management Team (Equipe Cadre de la Zone de Santé) responsible for areas such as administration, immunization programs, community mobilization, pharmaceutical management, sanitation, and nutrition.

The health infrastructure in Selembao includes 145 health facilities, although only 42 are officially recognized by the Health Zone's Central Office. The public sector comprises two main facilities: the Makala General Referral Hospital (Hôpital Général de Référence de Makala) and the Kitokimosi Maternity Referral Health Center (Centre de Santé Maternité de Référence Kitokimosi). In addition to public institutions, the commune is served by numerous health centers operated by private entities and religious organizations.

== Environmental problems ==
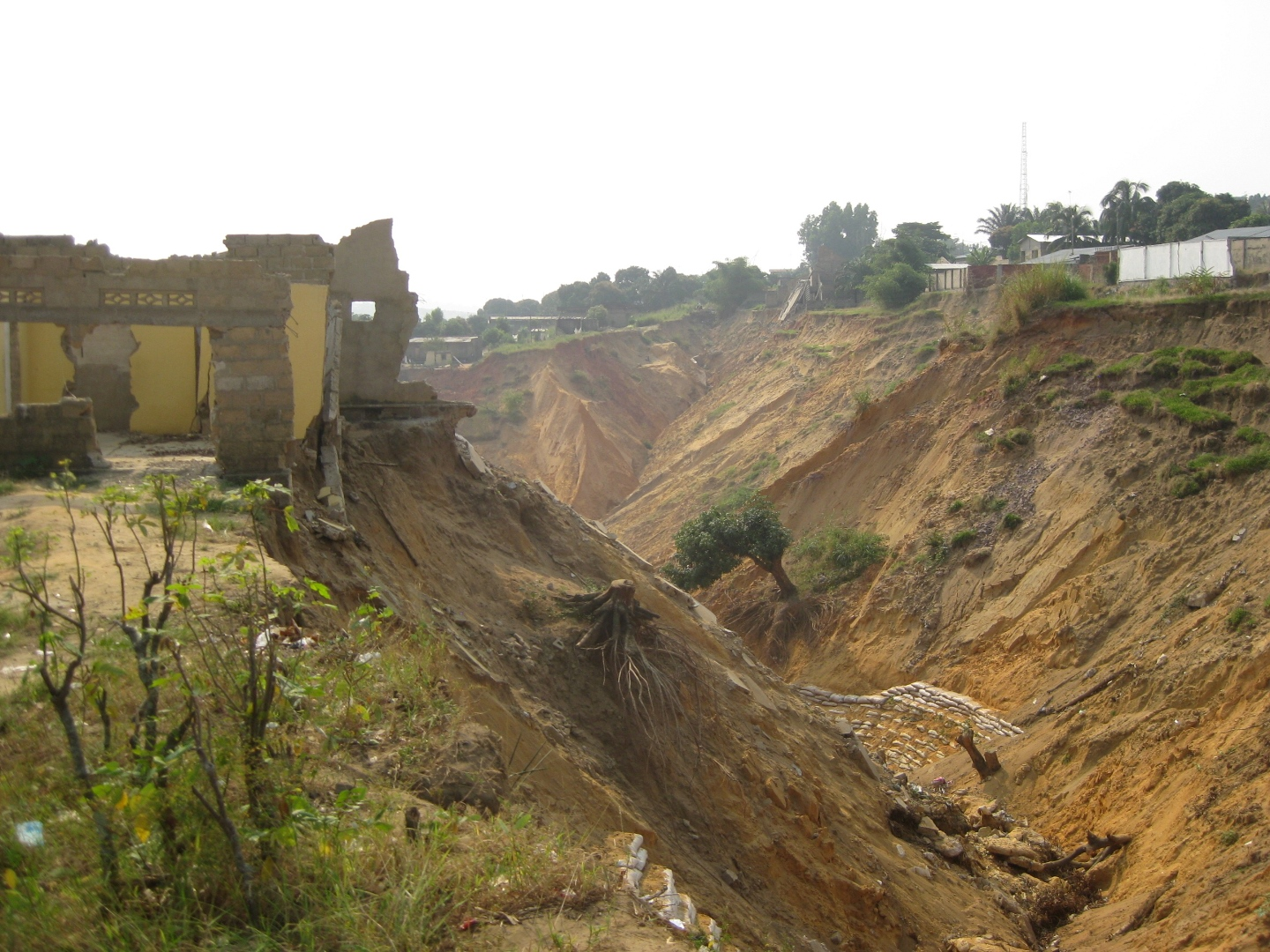
Erosion in neighboring Mont Ngafula commune

Selembao faces significant environmental issues, most notably the widespread advance of gully erosion that has significantly reshaped its urban terrain. The interaction of steep slopes, heavy seasonal rainfall, insufficient drainage networks, and inadequate maintenance has enabled the rapid expansion of ravines throughout many residential quartiers.

A significant share of gullies, around 30%, originates from the failure of retention basins such as those in Nkingu, Gemena, and Lusanga. In these areas, a lack of basin maintenance causes rainwater to overflow, scour foundation soils, and eventually collapse the structures, turning adjoining streets into deeply incised ravines. The most widespread form of ravine formation, accounting for about 40% of cases, is linked to the absence of effective drainage systems in areas such as Conseil-Urbain 1, Conseil-Urbain 2, Matondo, and Mbodi, where stormwater consistently follows the steepest natural gradients during rainfall, carving progressively deeper channels into unprotected street surfaces. This process often produces secondary gullies branching off from the main erosion paths. Another 10 percent of ravines, including the Nsuangi and Citoyen ravines, formed as a result of leaks along REGIDESO drinking-water pipelines, where high-pressure water escapes into the soil, first forming narrow channels that deepen with successive rains into permanent gullies. The remaining 20% of ravines develop following the rupture or collapse of undersized drainage gutters, as in the Conseil-Urbain 3 area, where insufficient canalization capacity leads to structural failure and localized erosion. These processes have altered portions of Selembao's built environment, threatening homes and utilities, interrupting mobility, and contributing to greater sediment loads downstream. While certain ravines, particularly in Gemena and Lusanga, have stabilized through vegetation growth, others, such as those in Nkingu and Nsuangi, remain active and continue to extend.

One of the most prominent examples of erosion is the Selembao Drive Ravine (drève de Selembao), which began forming in 1990 and extends approximately 1,300 meters in length, with an average width of 60 meters and a depth reaching 12 meters. According to a 2008 report by Fils Makanzu Imwangana of the University of Kinshasa, the ravine had resulted in the deaths of six people and the destruction of 71 residential structures. Though substantial in scale, the erosion at Selembao Drive has since been partially mitigated through civil engineering interventions funded by the World Bank. Prior to these efforts, the ravine posed a serious threat to a well-planned and affluent residential quartiers, as well as to the integrity of National Road No. 1 (RN1).

=== Active ravines ===
- Nkingu Ravine: With steep, vegetation-free slopes, the Nkingu ravine remains active. It spans 654 meters in length, 64 meters in width, and 25 meters in depth, and has evacuated over 619,117 cubic meters of material during its 29-year history.
- Nsuangi Ravine: Although some vegetation exists on its slopes, this ravine remains active due to continuous erosive processes.
- Conseil-Urbain 1 and Conseil-Urbain 2: These ravines originated from leaks in the water supply pipelines running along the streets of these areas. Initially, high-pressure, high-flow water leaks eroded the soil, forming gutters that were subsequently enlarged by rainfall. Over time, these gutters deepened into ravines, compromising affected streets and surrounding infrastructure. The progressing erosion jeopardizes nearby residential properties, with exposed electrical cables as the ground continues to erode.
- Conseil-Urbain 3 Ravine: This ravine primarily developed as a result of the failure of an undersized drainage gutter. Although some slopes have been colonized by vegetation, their coverage remains inconsistent. The outlet slope displays signs of ongoing erosion, though at a decelerated rate in comparison to fully active ravines.

=== Stable ravines ===
- Gemena and Lusanga Ravines: These ravines have slopes covered with bamboo and fruit trees, which have stabilized the erosive processes, classifying them as stable.

=== Unstable ravines ===
- Citizen Ravine: Despite having vegetated slopes, the instability of its structure has led to its classification as an unstable ravine.
