= Kasa-Vubu, Kinshasa =

Kasa-Vubu
- Commune
- Commune de Kasa-Vubu
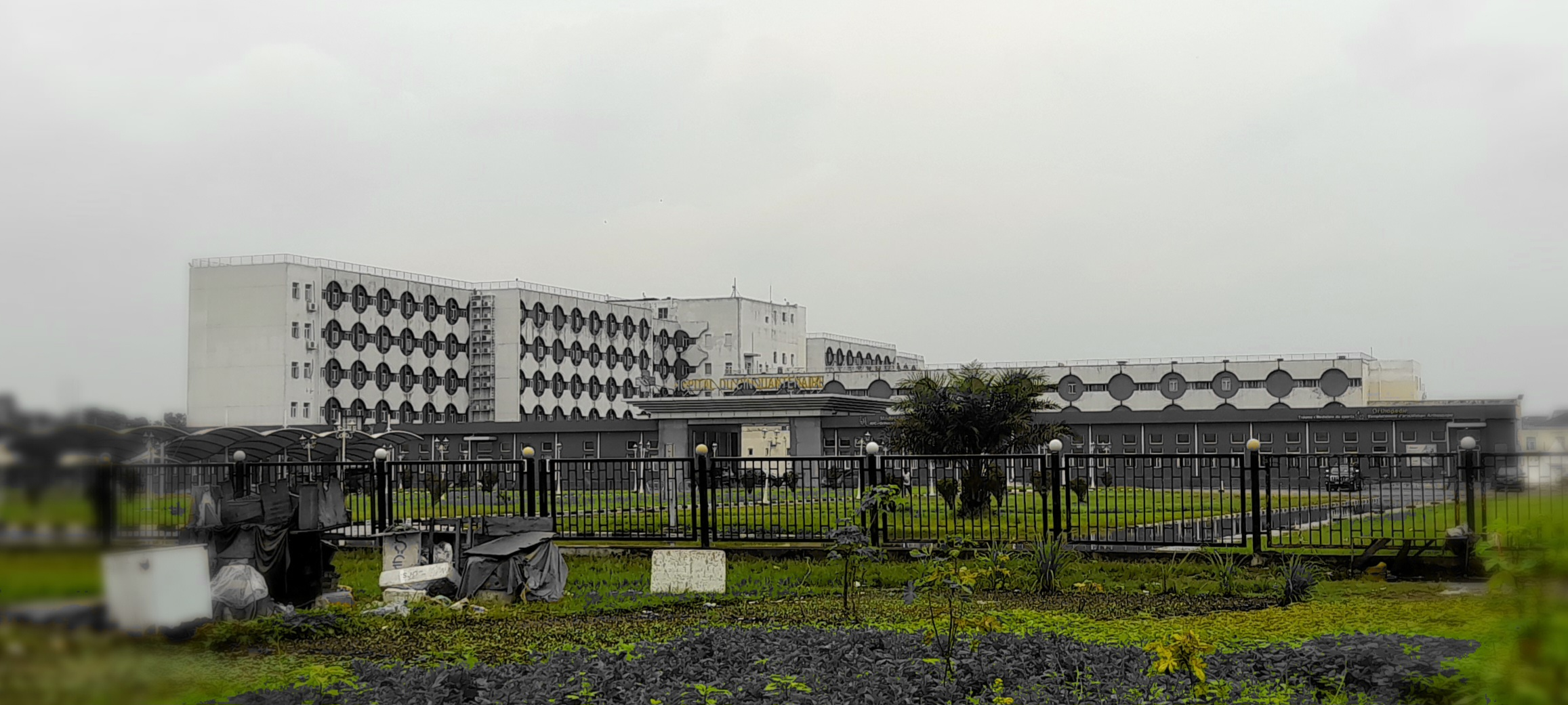
- Hôpital du Cinquantenaire
- Kasa-Vubu on map of Kinshasa city-province
- Location in DR Congo
- Coordinates: 04°20′33″S 015°18′19″E
- Country: DR Congo
- City-Province: Kinshasa

Area
  - Total: 5.05 km^{2} (1.95 sq mi)

Population (2004 est.)
  - Total: 157,320
  - Density: 31,200/km^{2} (80,700/sq mi)

Kasa-Vubu is a municipality (commune) in the Funa district of Kinshasa, the capital city of the Democratic Republic of the Congo.

Along with Kalamu, it forms the historical African heart of Kinshasa. Formerly known as Dendale, the town's name derives from the first president of the Congo after independence, Joseph Kasa-Vubu, who was elected mayor of the commune in 1957.

== Demographics ==
Historical population
| Year | 1967 | 1970 | 1984 | 2003 | 2004 |
| Pop. | 56,540 | 67,525 | 74,888 | 152,141 | 157,320 |
| ±% | — | +19.4% | +10.9% | +103.2% | +3.4% |
