= Nsele =

Nsele N'Sele
- Commune
- Commune de Nsele
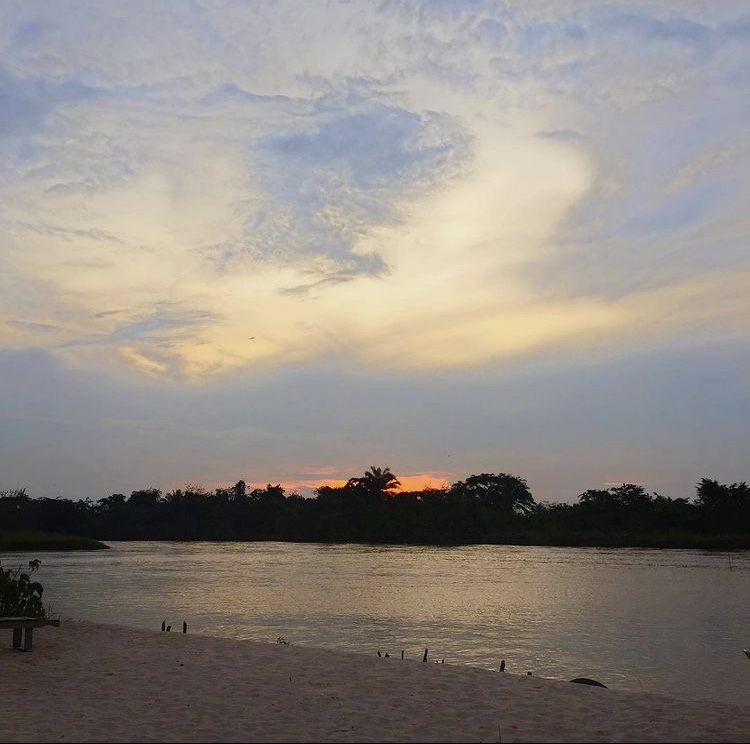
- Enka Beach in Nsele
- Nsele on map of Kinshasa city-province
- Location in DR Congo
- Coordinates: 4°22′28″S 15°29′41″E
- Country: DR Congo
- City-Province: Kinshasa

Area
  - Total: 898.8 km^{2} (347.0 sq mi)

Population (2015 est.)
  - Total: 387,790
  - Density: 431.5/km^{2} (1,117/sq mi)

Nsele or N'Sele is a commune in the Tshangu District of Kinshasa. It is located east of Kinshasa's city center on Pool Malebo and covers an area of 898,8 square kilometers, making it the second-largest commune by land area in the city. It is bounded by the Tshuenge River to the north, by Kongo Central to the south, by Maluku to the east, and by N'djili International Airport to the west. Its population was estimated at 317,916 in 2013 and 387,790 in 2015.

The commune has undergone urban development over the past several years. It is named after the Nsele River and lies within an alluvial plain, extending across the Mangengenge Plateau.

== Geography ==
=== Terrain ===
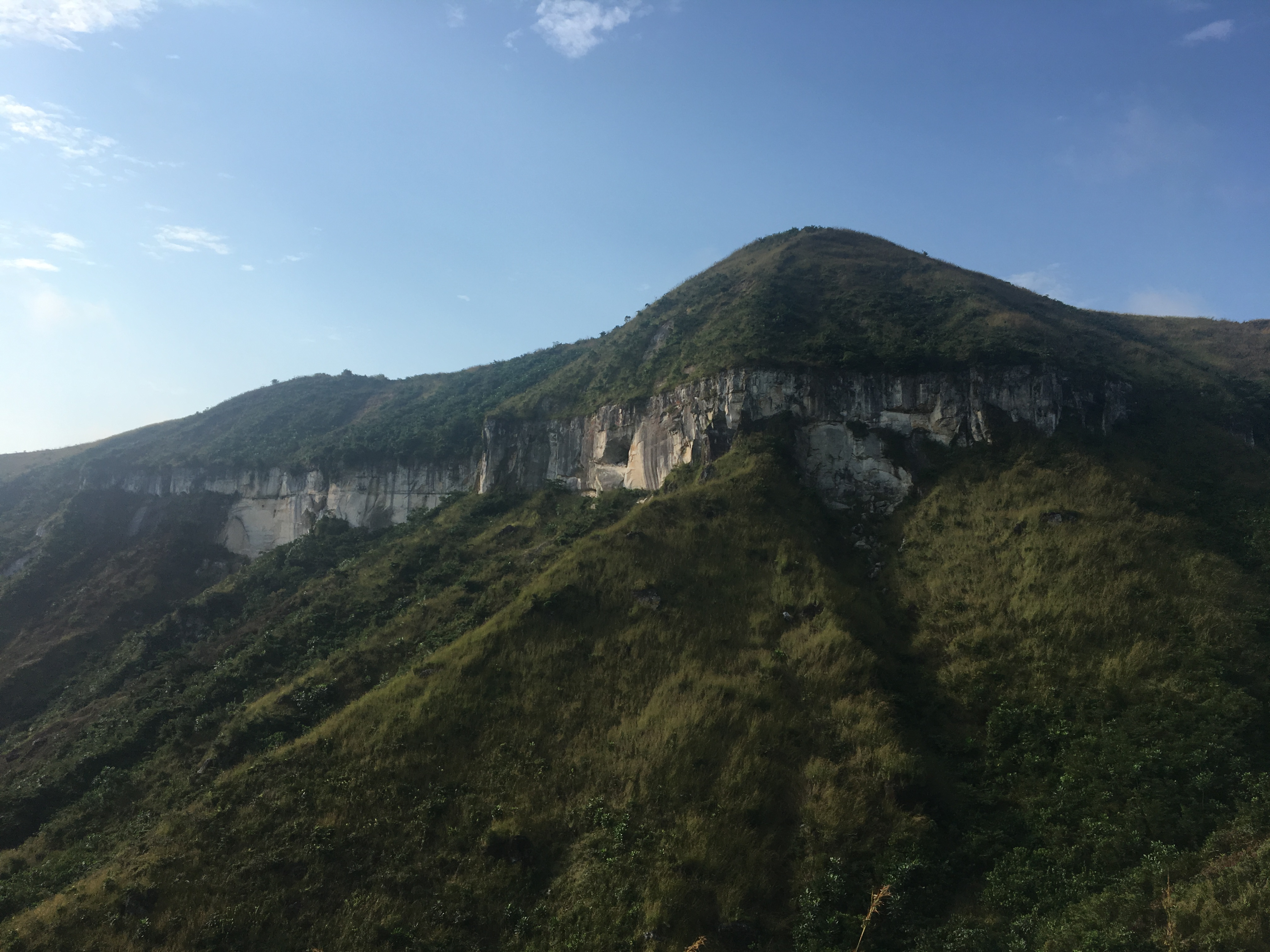
A view of Mount Mangengenge

Nsele lies within an alluvial plain and extends across the Mangengenge Plateau, which is characterized by isolated hills separated by escarpments. Its soils are predominantly clayey-sandy, consisting of fine yellow and brown clay-rich sand, alongside sandy soils created by the deposition and movement of sediments through rainfall, as well as moist sandy soils found in areas with higher levels of soil moisture. According to Congolese researcher Tridon Yangongo Mufubo, no officially recognized mineral deposits or other exploitable natural resources have been identified in the commune's subsoil.

The vegetation is dominated primarily by savanna and fragmented forest patches, many of which have been degraded by harmful human activities, particularly the excessive production of charcoal.

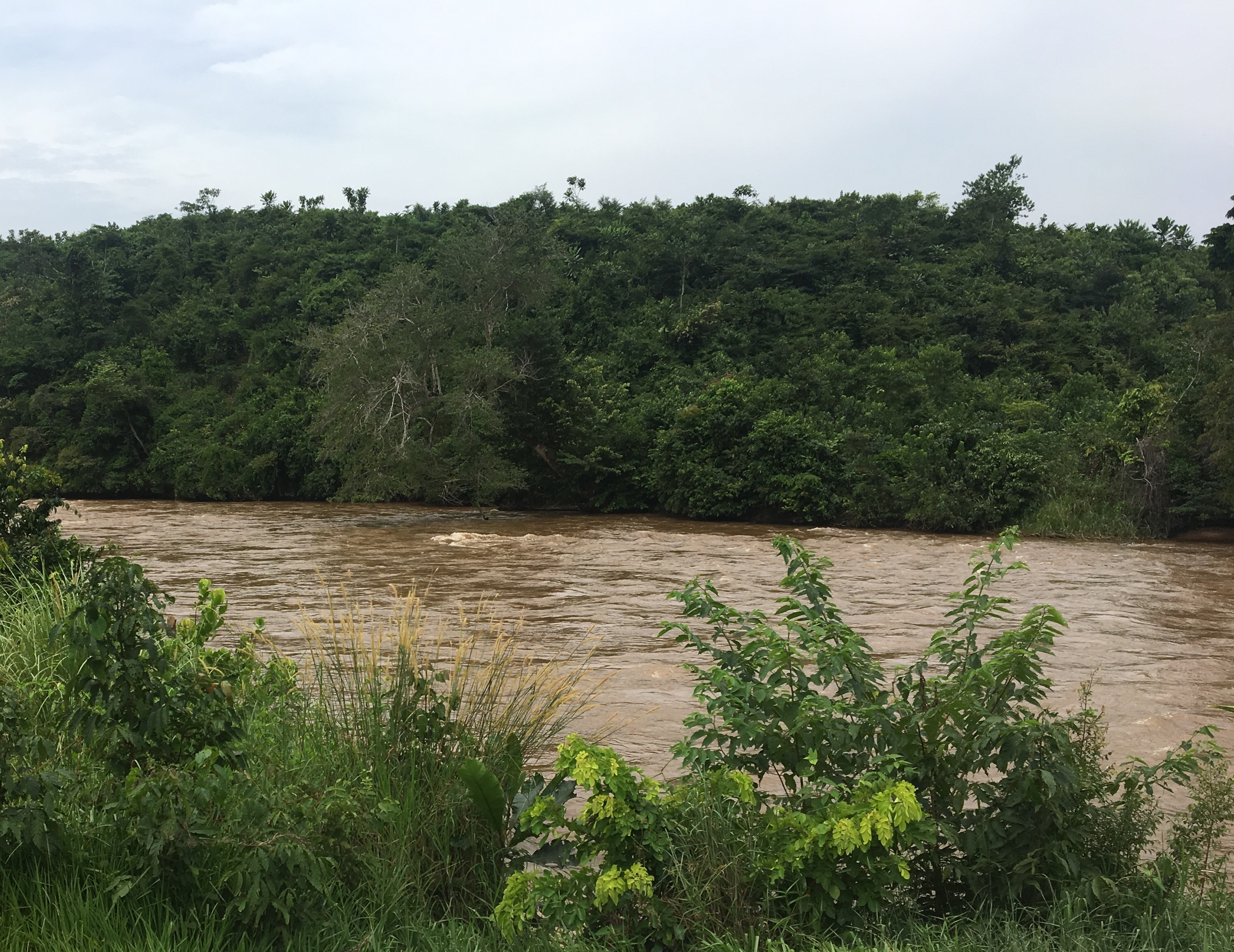
The Nsele River

The Nsele River is the commune's principal watercourse and the source of its name. The commune is also drained by numerous streams and rivers flowing into the Congo River, including the Bilala, Bibwa, Ingulu, Mpieme, Likana, Mfusu, Nka, Mahili, Tshuenge, Mango, and Dingi-Dingi rivers. The Dingi-Dingi River is a tributary of the Ndjili River.

Several lakes are located within the commune, including Ngainke, Inye, Mansia, Ngalu, Boo (Blue Lake), Green Lake, and others.

=== Administration ===
Nsele is administered by a mayor and a deputy mayor, supported by several municipal departments. These include offices responsible for civil registration, population administration, housing, environmental management, social affairs, and the promotion of small and medium-sized enterprises, as well as branches of the Agence Nationale de Renseignements (ANR) and the general migration directorate. Policing and security fall under the territorial police.

List of mayors since the creation of the commune:

- 1968–1977: Boniface Iyaka Yoka Duku
- 1977–1982: Ngamunata Alu Mayal
- 1982–1988: Marcel Mutiene Ngamaba
- 1988–1989: Kamboko Mangendji Gugu
- 1989–March 1993: Roger Ngamika Mbumu
- March 1993–July 1993: Jean Paul Mambu Mbumu
- July 1993–June 1997: Roger Ngamika Mbumu
- 1997–1999: Ikene Mfumakana
- 1999–2000: Embulu Mpara
- 2000–2002: Roger Ngamika Mbumu
- 2002–2005: Indondo W'Indo Monene
- 2005: Augustin Nkama Indi

The commune is divided into 36 quartiers (quarters), which are further subdivided into 918 avenues. While these quartiers serve as functional units for governance and service delivery, they lack independent legal status.

Quartiers
Badara I
Badara II
Bahumbu I
Bahumbu II
Bel Air
Bibwa
Buma
Dingi Dingi
D.I.C./Lau
Domaine
Fleuve
Kindobo
Kinkole
Kirimi
Maba I
Maba II
Mangengenge
Mikala I
Mikala II
Mikonga I
Mikonga II
Mikonga III
Mibu I
Mibu II
Mikombe
Mpasa I
Mpasa II
Munke
Munziami
Ngamaba
Ngapama
Ngina I
Ngina II
Pêcheurs (Fishermen)
Sicotra
Singa Inga

Source: Rapport annuel, Bureau statistique, 2013

== Demographics ==
=== Population ===
Nsele's population increased steadily over several decades, rising from 24,096 inhabitants in 1970 to 28,963 in 1984, 136,290 in 2003, 140,929 in 2004, 255,128 in 2007, 317,916 in 2013, and 387,790 in 2015. This growth has been attributed to natural increase and migration into the commune.

Historical population
Year	1970	1984	2003	2004
Pop.	24,096	28,963	136,290	140,929
±%	—	+20.2%	+370.6%	+3.4%

2013 population distribution by quartiers (2013):

Quartiers	Population	Percentage
Badara I	6,354	2.0
Badara II	9,357	2.9
Bahumbu I	10,345	3.3
Bahumbu II	10,057	3.2
Bel Air	5,727	1.8
Bibwa	8,001	2.5
Buma	4,819	1.5
Dingidingi	6,248	2.0
D.I.C./Lau	2,556	0.8
Domaine	7,689	2.4
Fleuve	8,040	2.5
Kindobo	5,925	1.9
Kinkole	78,876	24.8
Kirimi	18,942	6.0
Maba I	1,579	0.5
Maba II	1,588	0.5
Mangengenge	1,237	0.4
Mikala I	2,305	0.7
Mikala II	2,046	0.6
Mikonga I	28,895	9.1
Mikonga II	11,708	3.7
Mikonga III	7,520	2.4
Mibu I	3,691	1.2
Mibu II	5,539	1.7
Mikombe	5,214	1.6
Mpasa I	8,957	2.8
Mpasa II	9,202	2.9
Munke	1,121	0.4
Munziami	1,281	0.4
Ngamaba	10,148	3.2
Ngapama	9,124	2.9
Ngina I	2,374	0.7
Ngina II	4,621	1.5
Pêcheurs (Fishermen)	13,144	4.1
Sicotra	2,004	0.6
Singa Inga	1,682	0.5
Total	317,916	100.0

Of the estimated 317,916 residents in 2013, 317,229 were Congolese citizens, while 687 were foreign nationals:

Age group	Congolese population			Foreign population			Grand total	Percentage
	Male	Female	Total	Male	Female	Total		
0–4 years	23,596	23,859	47,455	64	65	129	47,584	14.9
5–9 years	20,914	20,914	41,828	32	44	76	41,904	13.2
10–14 years	20,212	21,358	41,570	37	52	89	41,659	13.1
15–19 years	20,962	22,597	43,559	39	54	93	43,652	13.7
Subtotal	85,684	88,528	174,412	172	215	387	174,799	54.9
20–24 years	10,785	10,955	21,740	20	23	43	21,783	6.8
25–29 years	8,152	9,562	17,714	15	20	35	17,746	5.5
30–34 years	7,511	8,249	15,760	10	17	27	15,787	4.9
35–39 years	6,876	7,823	14,699	16	20	36	14,735	4.6
40–44 years	6,345	6,609	12,954	15	23	38	12,992	4.3
45–49 years	5,714	5,890	11,604	16	11	27	11,631	3.6
50–54 years	5,411	6,065	11,476	12	14	26	11,502	3.6
55–59 years	5,266	4,554	9,820	21	16	37	9,857	3.3
60–64 years	3,848	4,309	8,157	5	–	5	8,162	2.5
65–69 years	2,654	4,328	6,782	5	10	15	6,797	1.8
70–74 years	2,390	2,681	5,071	3	4	7	5,078	1.5
Subtotal	64,952	69,825	134,779	138	158	296	135,070	42.4
75–79 years	1,411	1,785	3,196	2	2	4	3,200	1.0
80–84 years	1,304	1,757	3,061	1	–	1	3,062	0.9
85–89 years*	660	799	1,459	–	–	–	1,459	0.5
90 years and over	244	280	524	–	–	–	524	0.3
Subtotal	3,619	4,621	8,240	2	2	4	8,244	2.7
Grand total	154,245	162,984	317,229	312	375	687	317,916	100.0

The commune had a relatively young population, with 54.9% of residents aged 0–19 years, 42.4% between 20 and 74 years, and 2.7% aged 75 years or older. Females constitute the majority of the commune's population, and birth records indicate that girls slightly outnumber boys among newborns.

Nsele is home to a multiethnic population dominated by Teke-Humbu, Ngala, Yaka, Mbala, Yanzi, Songye, Kongo, and others.

=== Health ===
The Nsele Health Zone (zone de santé de Nsele) is a decentralized health district in eastern Kinshasa within the Maluku Health District (district sanitaire de Maluku), serving most of the commune. The health zone covers an area of 1,408 square kilometers and had a population of 126,735 in 2014, distributed across its 15 health areas.

== History ==
In 1929, Léopoldville became the administrative center after taking over from Boma following the implementation of the Royal Decree of 1 July 1923, countersigned by the Minister of the Colonies, Louis Franc. Once the transfer was finalized, a new government quartier was created between Kinshasa, which was becoming a busy commercial center, and Léopoldville-West, an older settlement. The new quartier was named Kalina, now called Gombe, and served as the colonial administrative center. Before this, Léopoldville was considered an "urban district" that included only Kintambo and what is now Gombe, which had grown around Ngaliema Bay. The communes of Kinshasa, Barumbu, and Lingwala were later established. During the 1930s, these communes were mainly home to workers from Chanic, Filtisaf, and UTEXAFRICA.

In 1941, Legislative Ordinance No. 293/AIMO, passed on 25 June officially granted Léopoldville city status. It also created an Urban Committee to manage the city, which covered about 5,000 hectares and had a population of around 53,000 people. Kinshasa became the capital of the colony, the capital of the Congo-Kasaï province and the Moyen Congo district. The city was divided into two zones. The urban zone included Léo II, Léo-Ouest, Kalina, Léo-I (also called Léo-Est), and Ndolo, while the southern part was set aside as the indigenous zone. After forced labor ended in 1945, many Africans moved from rural areas into the city, which caused the population to grow quickly. Bakongo became the largest ethnic group in Léopoldville.

In the 1950s, the planned cités of Lemba, Matete, and part of N'djili were built to house workers from the Limete Industrial Zone. In 1954, the city opened the colony's first university, Lovanium University, now called the University of Kinshasa. By 1957, Léopoldville had 11 communes and six annexed zones. The communes were Kalamu, Dendale (now Kasa-Vubu), Saint-Jean (now Lingwala), Ngiri-Ngiri, Kintambo, Limete, Bandalungwa, Léopoldville (now Gombe), Barumbu, Kinshasa, and Ngaliema. The annexed zones included Lemba, Binza, Makala, Kimwenza, Kimbanseke, and Kingasani, with N'djili and Matete added later. In 1966, the city officially changed its name from Léopoldville to Kinshasa. Two years later, in 1968, it was granted the status of a region, and the number of communes increased to 24. The new communes were Nsele, Bumbu, Kimbanseke, Kisenso, Makala, Maluku, Masina, Mont Ngafula, Ngaba, and Selembao.

== Economy ==
The commune's economy is based primarily on fishing, agriculture, and livestock farming. The principal agricultural products include food crops, market garden crops, and perennial crops. Several agricultural and horticultural production centers are located in the commune, including Tshuenge, Dingi-Dingi, N'djili-Brasserie, Kinkole, and others. Fishing is practiced mainly in the Kinkole quartier, which is also known for its maboké, a traditional fish dish slow-cooked in leaves.

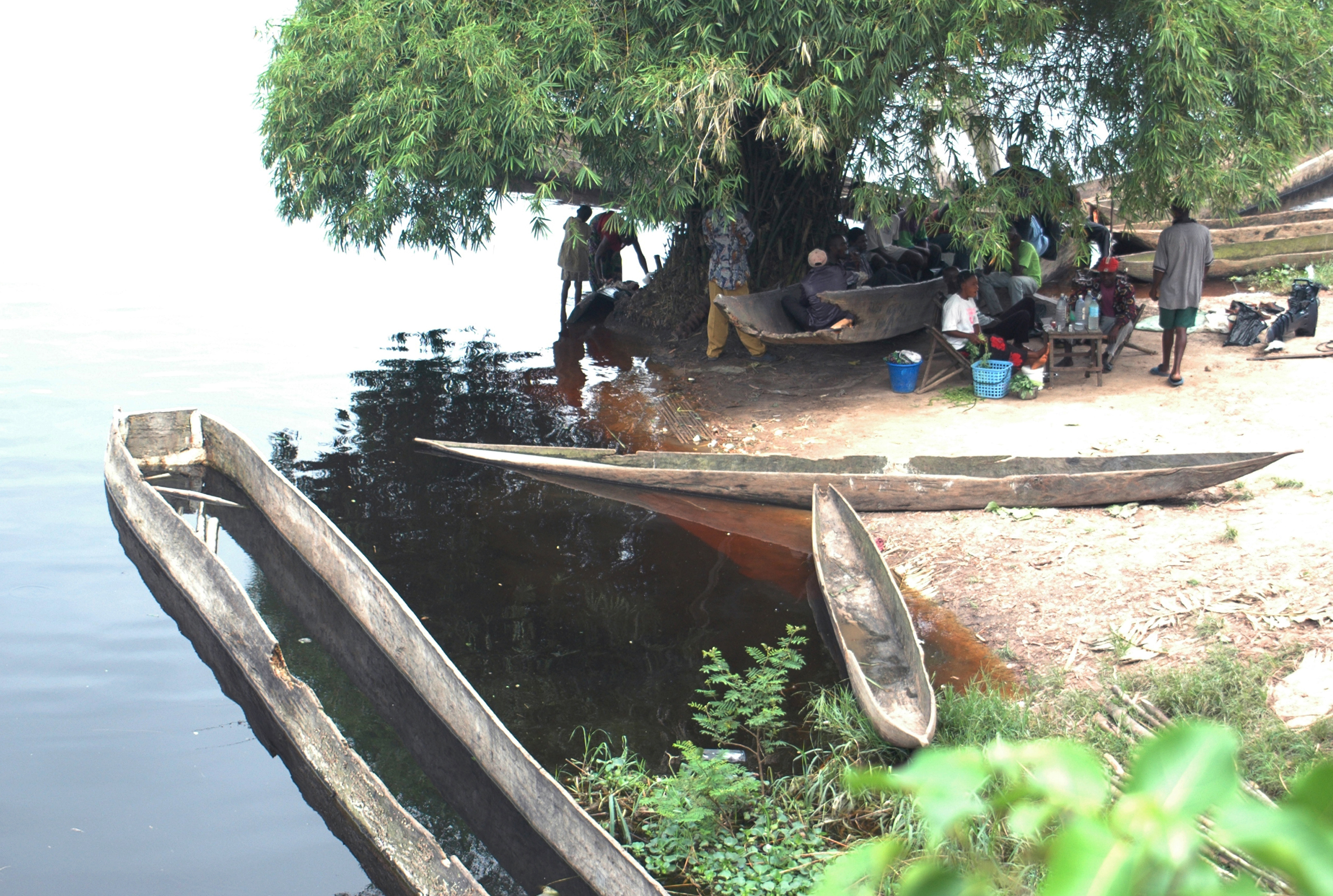
A view of the population living next the Congo River in Kinkole, Nsele

The commune is also home to several tourist attractions, including the parc naturel de la Nsele (known as Domaine de la Nsele), the Garden of Eden (Le Jardin d'Eden), Safari Beach, Enka Beach, Nganda Yala, and other recreational sites.

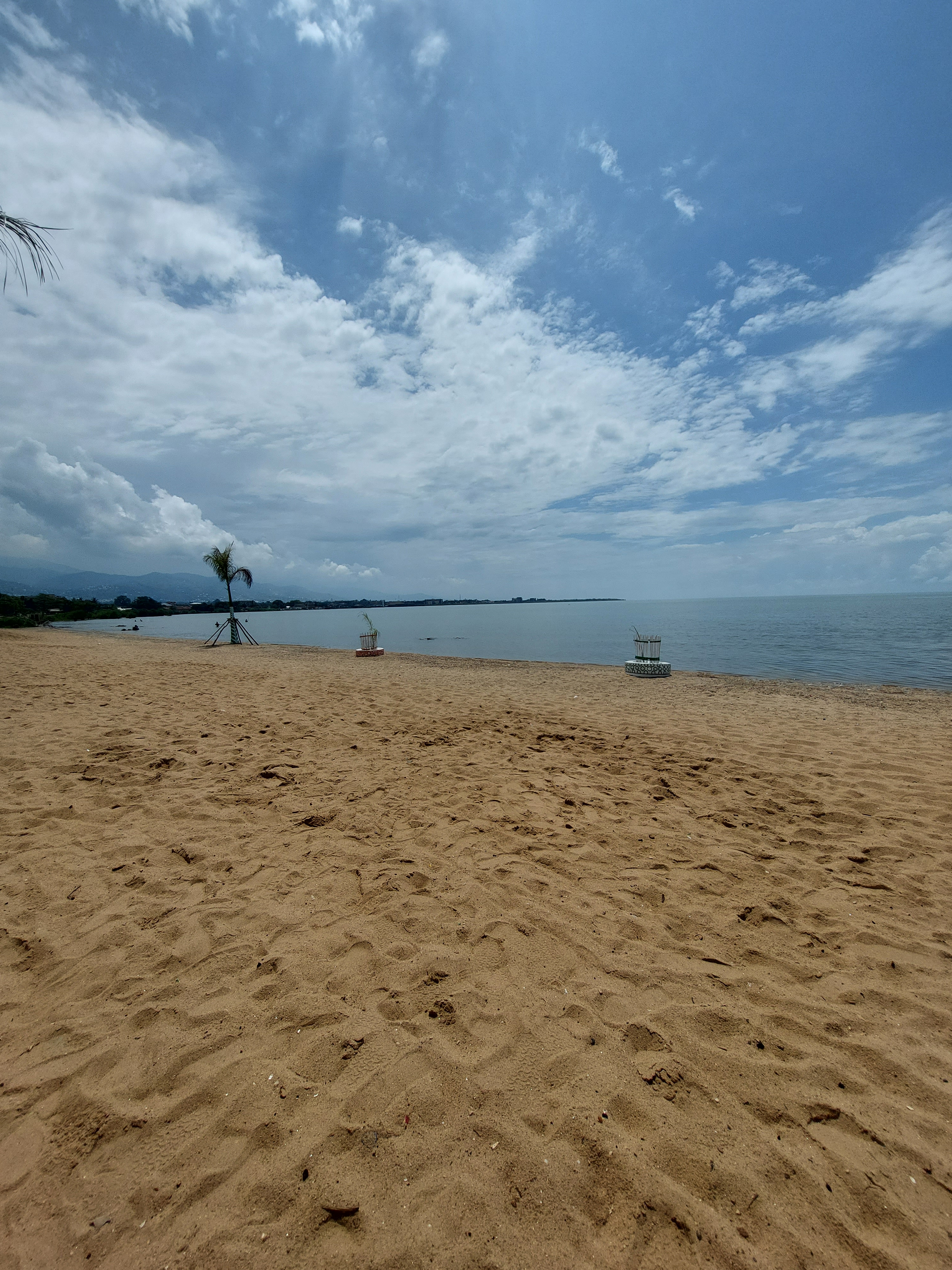
Enka Beach

== Infrastructure ==
=== Transport, sanitation, and housing ===
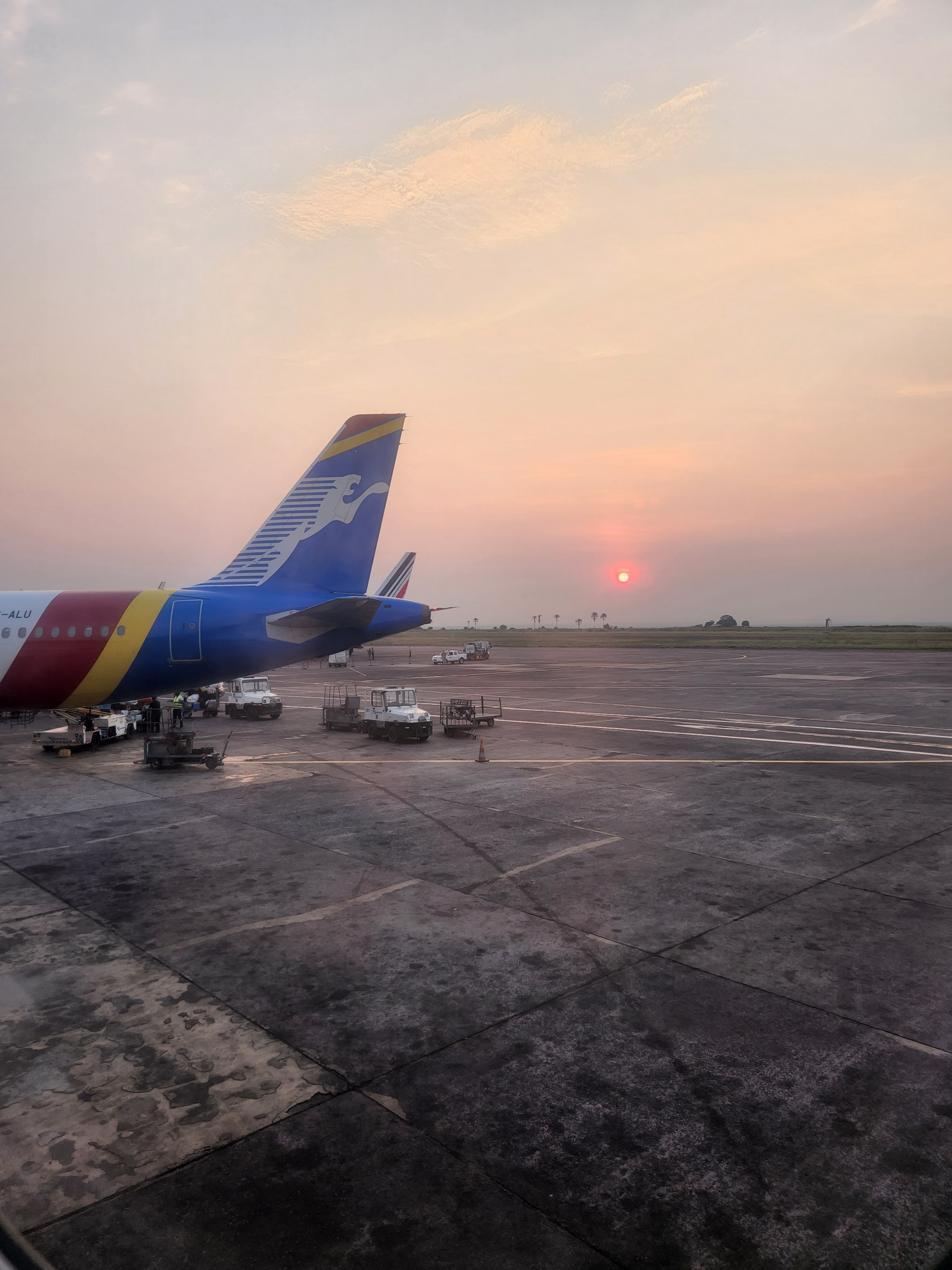
N'djili International Airport

The commune is home to N'djili International Airport, the country's principal international airport. Although several roads are well planned and paved, with drainage channels for domestic wastewater and stormwater, the drains are generally undersized. Wastewater and rainwater often remain on the streets.

A 2013 survey of 222 households by Tridon Yangongo Mufubo found that 86.4% occupied plots with bare earth, compared with 6.8% with lawns, 5.9% with cemented compounds, and 0.9% with tiled yards. Owner-occupied or family-owned housing accounted for 65.3% of surveyed households, while 34.7% were tenants. The survey identified three principal housing types: progressive (incremental) housing (74.3%), temporary or precarious housing (23.4%), and villas (2.3%).
