= Mont Ngafula =

- Commune
- Commune de Mont Ngafula
- Mont Ngafula on map of Kinshasa city-province
- Location in DR Congo
- Coordinates: 04°25′29″S 15°17′44″E
- Country: DR Congo
- City-Province: Kinshasa

Area
  - Total: 358.92 km^{2} (138.58 sq mi)

Population (2015 est.)
  - Total: 718,197
  - Density: 2,001.0/km^{2} (5,182.6/sq mi)

Mont Ngafula, or Mont-Ngafula, is a commune in the Lukunga District of Kinshasa, in the western part of the Democratic Republic of the Congo. By surface area, Mont Ngafula is the third-largest commune in Kinshasa's city-province. It is located in the city's hilly southern area and is intersected by the Lukaya River valley in its southern portion. The boundary with the Ngaliema commune is defined by the Lukunga River. Mont Ngafula shares borders with the Makala commune to the north, the Kongo Central Province to the south, the Lemba and Kisenso communes to the east, and the Selembao commune to the west. It has an estimated population of 718,197 (2015).

Residence in the area is relatively new; in the 1970s, it became home to a small number of upper and middle-class business executives, politicians and other relatively affluent people. However, many of the extravagant compounds commissioned remain incomplete due to the drastic economic decline that characterized the latter portion of the Mobutu era.

Mont Ngafula is home to several notable landmarks, including the Loyola University of Congo and the antiquated Catholic mission Sainte Marie de Kimwenza. It also houses Kimbondo Pediatric Hospital and the cultural and religious center Mater Dei. The Mont Ngafula municipal building is located at Mobutu Avenue. Lycée Kimwenza and Elisabeth International Bilingual School are regional prominent schools, while the Faculty of Agronomic and Veterinary Science is the most significant research center for agricultural and veterinary technical education. Lake Ma-Vallée, Joli Camp Site, Mission de Kimwenza, Lola ya Bonobo and Petites Chutes de la Lukaya are the region's most prominent and significant tourist destinations.

== Etymology ==
The name Mont Ngafula derived from two elements: Mont, which translates to "hill", and Ngafula, the surname of the Humbu village chief (Kapita) who formerly led the area when it was a Humbu village. In essence, the name means "Ngafula's Hill".

== Geography ==
=== Location ===
The Mont Ngafula is geographically bordered by Makala commune to the north, Kongo Central Province to the south, the communes of Lemba and Kisenso to the east, and Selembao commune to the west. The commune's terrain is characterized by a series of hills and deeply incised valleys, often transected by rivers or affected by erosion, creating a landscape that poses challenges for the development of urban infrastructure. However, the humid valleys provide fertile grounds for agricultural activities, which are widespread in the area.

=== Hydrology and vegetation ===
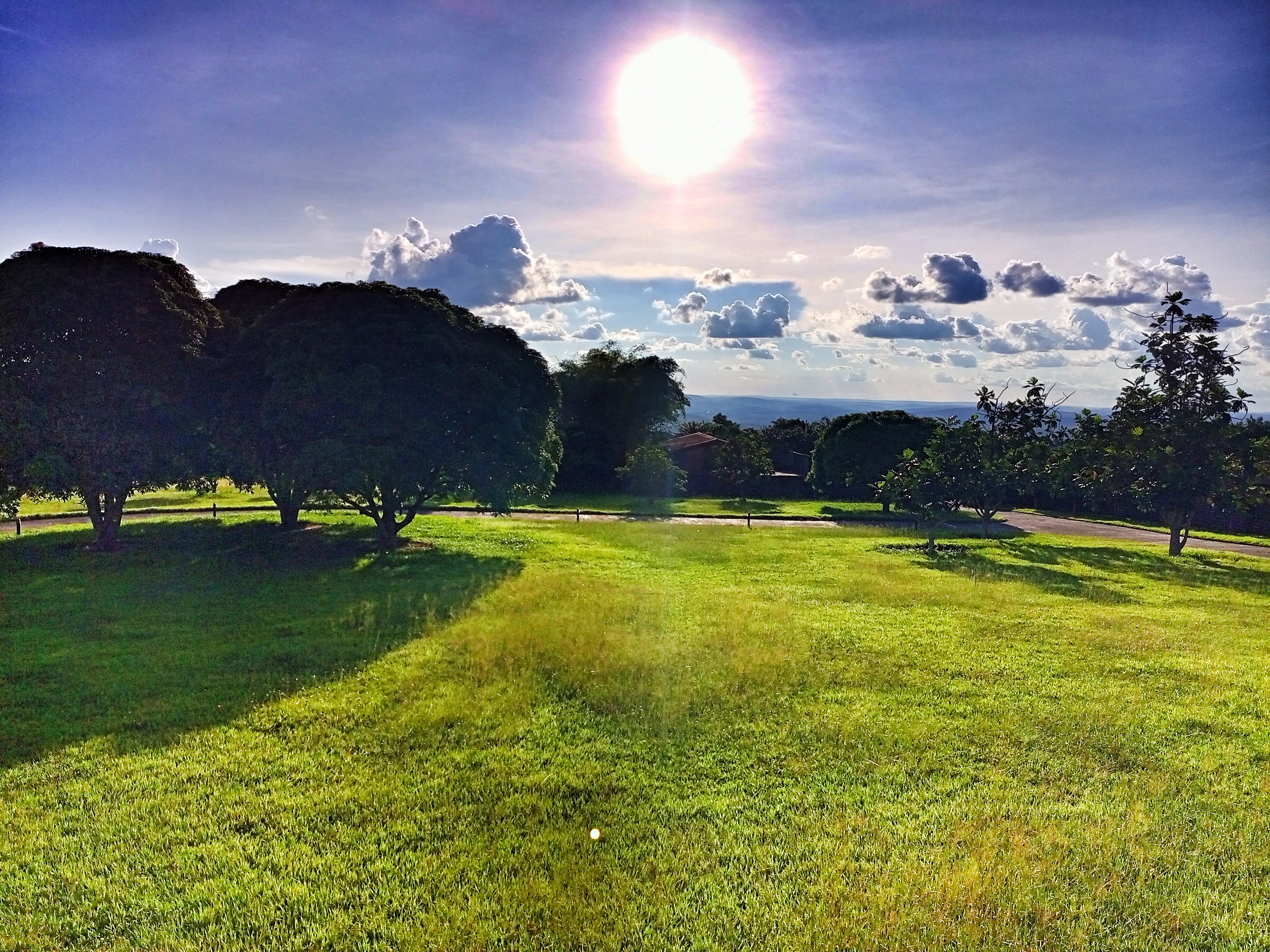
Sunset view in Kimbondo

Mont Ngafula is bounded by two significant rivers: the Lukaya River to the south and the Ndjili River to the east. Along the riverbanks, particularly between Kinsuka and the mouth of the Inkisi River, there are gallery forests and seasonally flooded woodlands. In certain areas, such as Notre-Dame de l'Assomption, patches of dense, evergreen humid forests persist. Similar dense forest formations are found near Kimwenza school and the Lac Ma Vallée area, with the woody vegetation in these zones remaining largely natural, although the influence of human activity is evident through the presence of exotic species like Terminalia superba, Eucalyptus, Senna siamea, and Millettia laurentii. Aquatic and semi-aquatic plants dominate the wetlands, with species such as Echinochloa, Vossia cuspidata, Cyperus, Nymphaea, and Eichhornia thriving in the marshy depressions. On the plateaus and hills, tall grasses such as Hyparrhenia diplandra, Loudetia simplex, and Megathyrsus maximus are common, though they are often affected by seasonal bushfires during the dry period.

=== Geology and climate ===
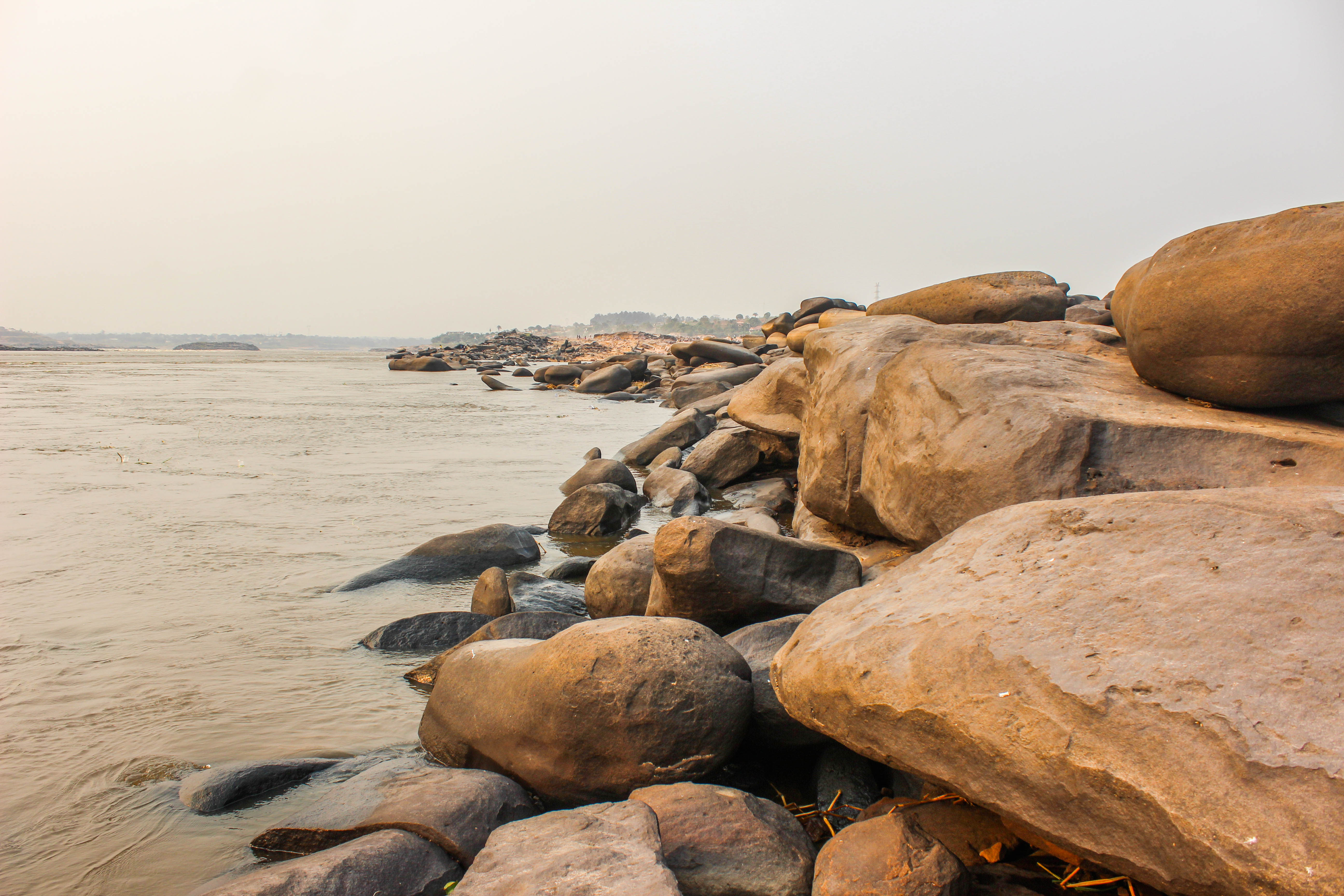
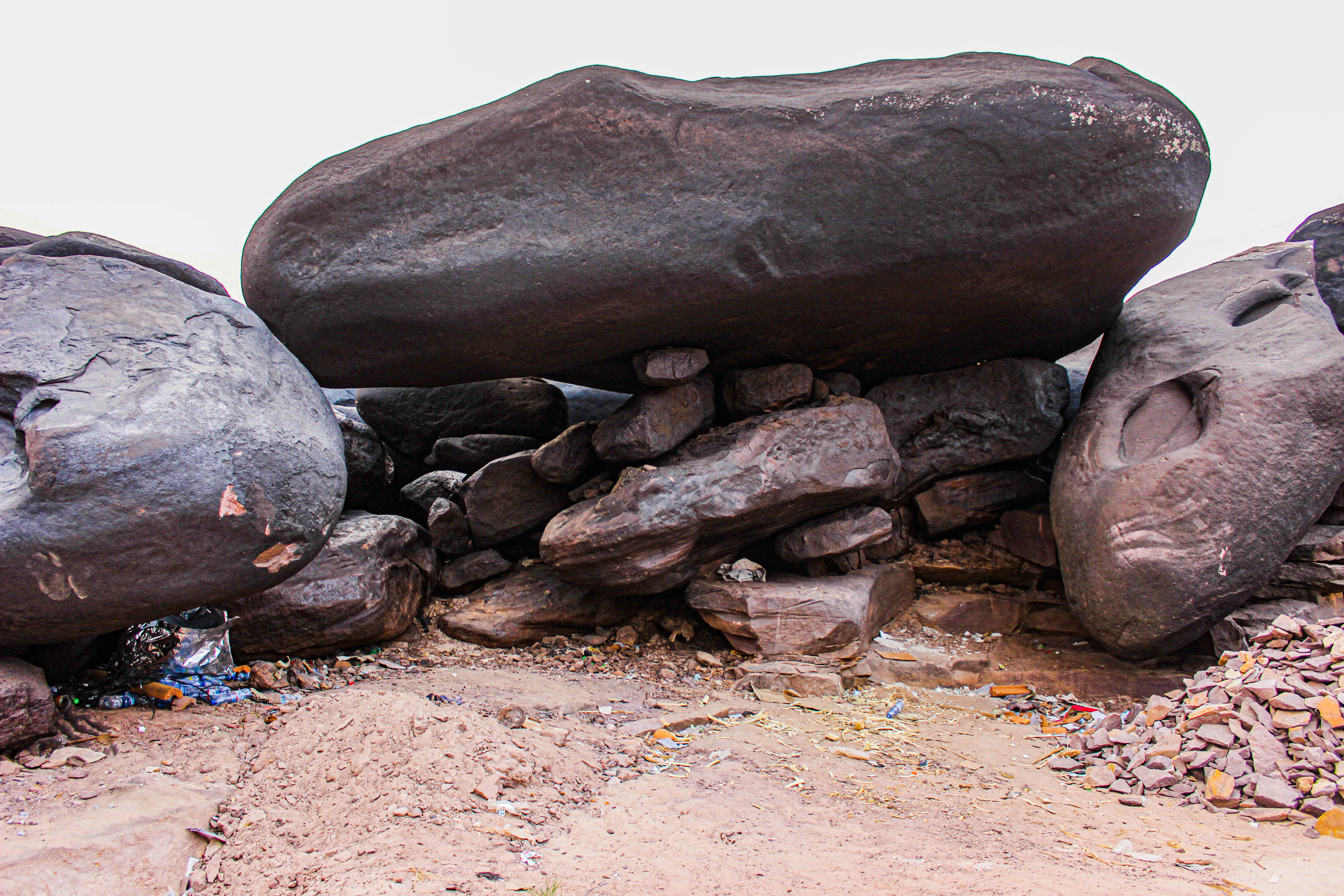
Boulders along the Congo River at Mbudi Nature, located in the Mbudi neighborhood.

The soil in Mont Ngafula is of the AC profile, with a sandy texture and low clay content. The upper organic horizon is distinct from the underlying parent rock due to its darker coloration, a feature indicative of the region's soil composition.

Climatically, Mont Ngafula falls within the AW4 climate category according to the Köppen classification, signifying a tropical humid climate. The region experiences a pronounced dry season from May to August or June to September, while the rainy season spans from late September to late May, lasting approximately eight months. The area receives an average annual rainfall of 1483.5 mm, with November being the wettest month, averaging 268.1 mm of precipitation. Temperatures remain moderate throughout the year, with an annual average below 25°C. The hottest month is March, with an average of 24.74°C, while the coolest is July, averaging 22.06°C. Relative humidity averages 79%, peaking at 84% in November and May, and dropping to a low of 71% in September.

=== Administrative division ===
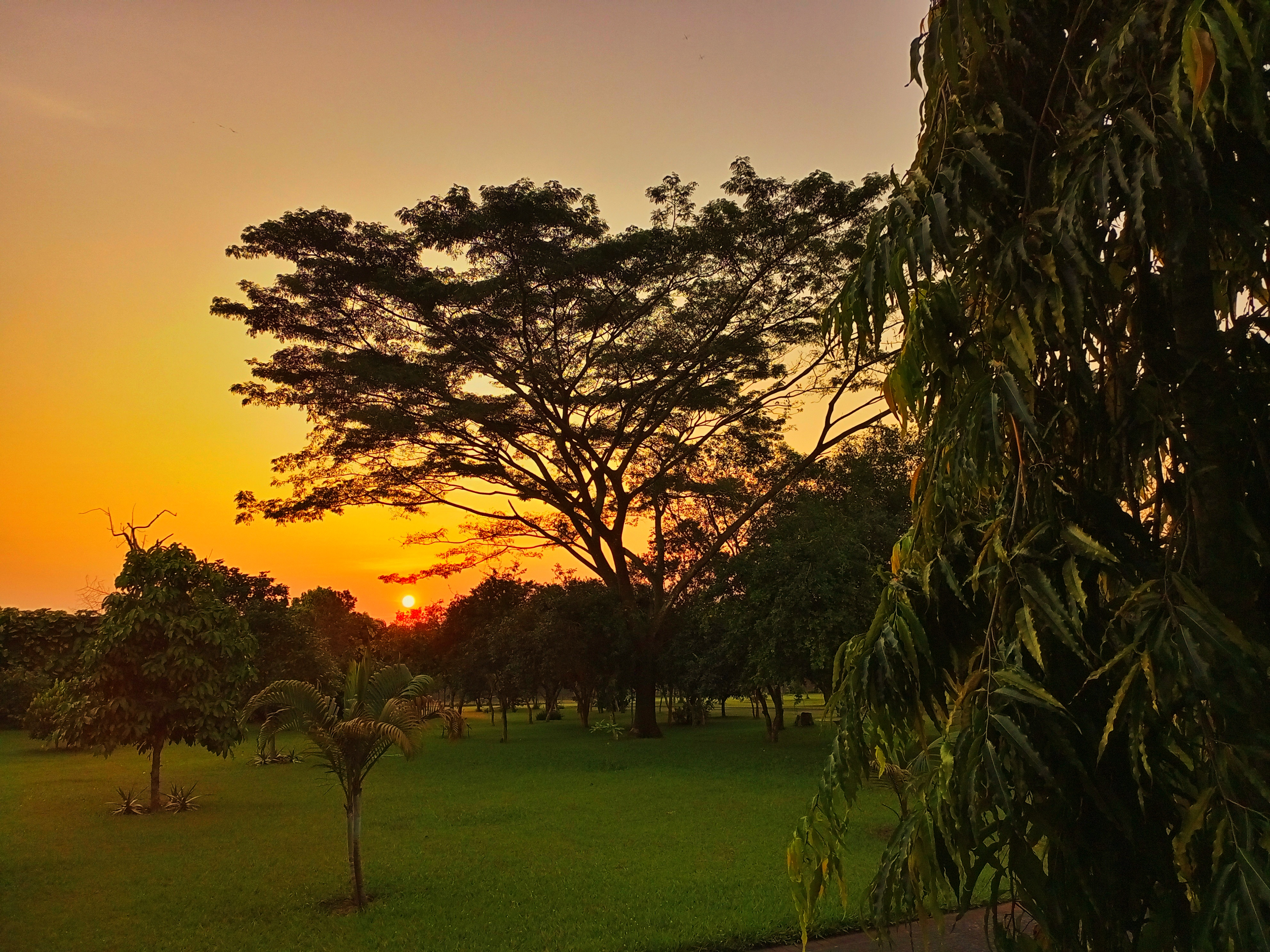
Kimbondo

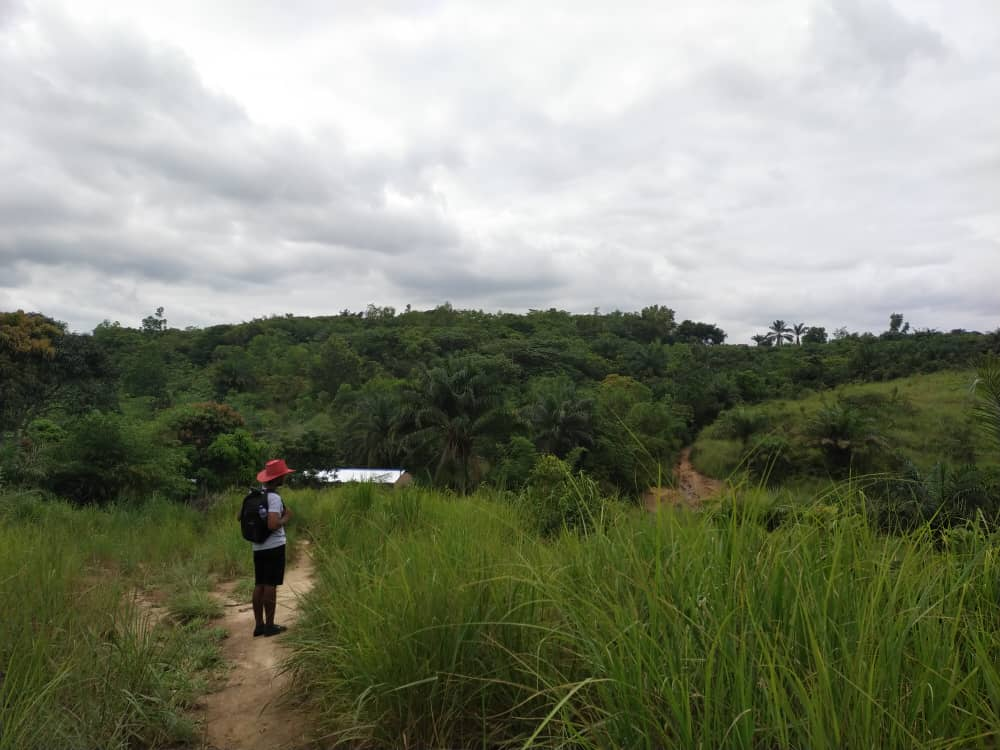
Kimwenza

Pursuant to statutory provisions, both the city and the commune are recognized as decentralized administrative entities, each endowed with legal personality, whereas neighborhoods within them function as administrative subdivisions devoid of legal personality or autonomous representation (Article II, Ordinance Law No. 82-006).

Mont Ngafula is administratively subdivided into 20 neighborhoods:

- Mbudi
- Kimbondo
- Kimbuta
- Kimwenza
- Kimbuala
- Kindele
- Lutendele
- Mama Mobutu
- Mama Yemo
- Masanga-Mbila
- Musangu-Télécom
- Mazamba
- Matadi-Kibala
- Matadi-Mayo
- Mitendi
- Ndjili-Kilambu
- Ngansele
- Plateau 1
- Plateau 2
- Vunda-Manenga

The Mont Ngafula municipal administration operates from its headquarters on Mobutu Avenue.

== History ==
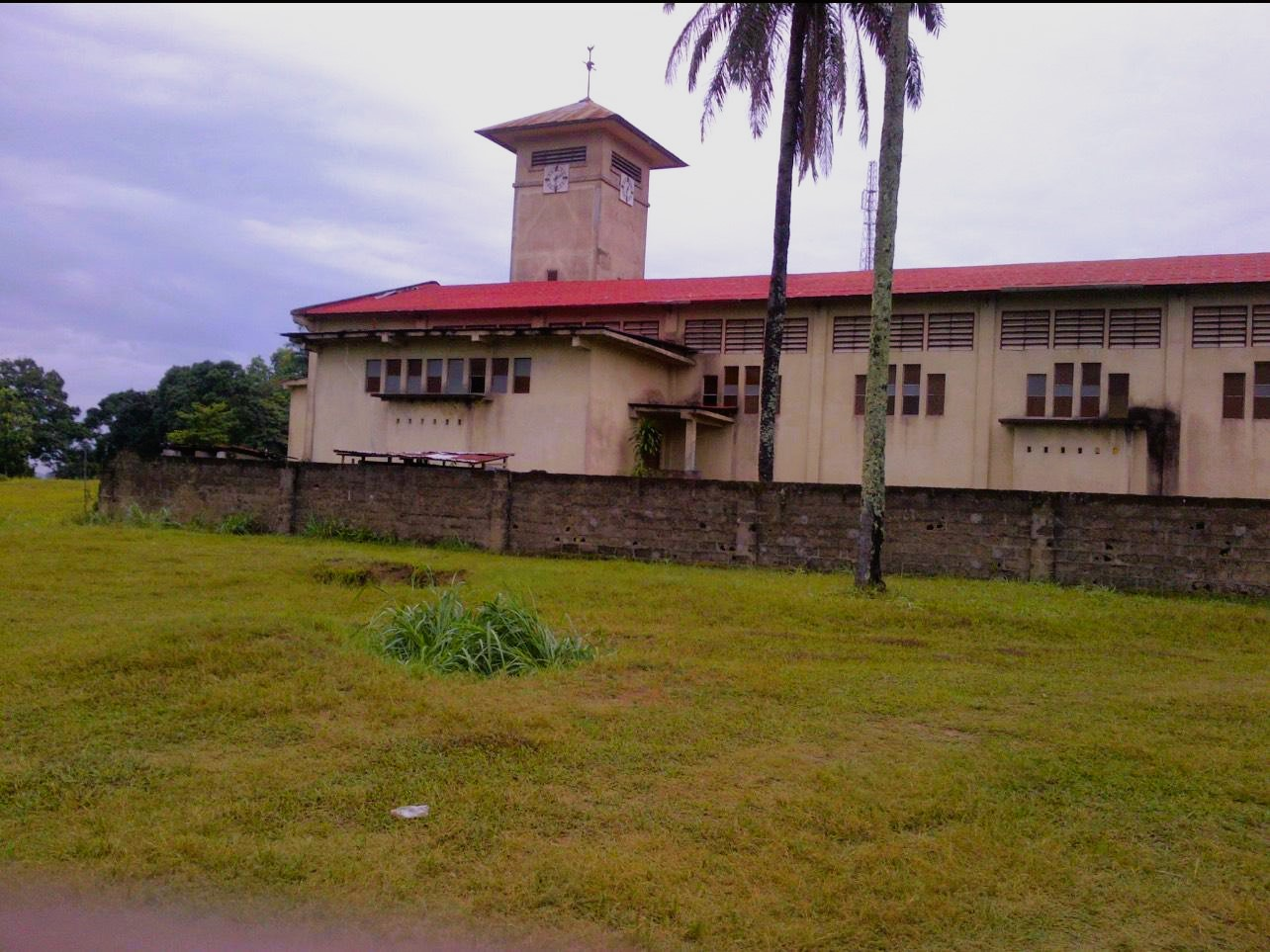
Sainte Marie de Kimwenza is one of the earliest Roman Catholic parish churches established in Kinshasa

Historically, Mont Ngafula was a large village inhabited by Humbu people in a suburban area. Prior to the Democratic Republic of the Congo's independence on 30 June 1960, the region experienced significant immigration from the Teke people, primarily from the southwestern regions of what is now the Republic of Congo. The Lari people, although a smaller group, also settled in the area alongside the Teke.

Mont Ngafula transitioned from a rural village to an official annexed zone under the decree-law of 13 October 1959, which outlined the organization of cities and communes. Articles 117 to 123 of this decree formalized its detachment from Kasangulu Territory, to which it previously belonged, and its annexation to the city of Kinshasa. This marked the first stage in Mont Ngafula's integration into Kinshasa's urban structure. By 10 April 1967, the annexed area was granted a special status as a suburban commune through Ordinance Law No. 67-117, which further solidified its political and administrative significance.

On 20 January 1968, Mont Ngafula was elevated to the status of an urban commune by Presidential Ordinance No. 008-24, which officially recognized Mont Ngafula as one of Kinshasa's urban communes. A year later, on 23 January 1969, Decree No. 69-0042 from the Ministry of the Interior finalized its status by including it among the 24 officially recognized communes of Kinshasa.

== Demographics ==
Historical population
Year	1967	1970	1984	2003	2004
Pop.	2,040	29,811	52,820	252,412	261,004
±%	—	+1361.3%	+77.2%	+377.9%	+3.4%

== Economy ==
Mont Ngafula's economy is predominantly agricultural. A significant portion of the population engages in crop cultivation, particularly market gardening practiced in the valleys of local rivers such as the Lukaya and on the slopes and terraces of the surrounding hills. These activities produce a variety of food crops that supply local households and municipal markets in Kinshasa. In the more peripheral areas, near the borders of the Kasangulu Territory, additional fields yield cassava, maize, chives, beans, and other staples for family consumption or commercial sale.

Livestock rearing is also widely practiced and serves as another critical component of the local economy. In the Mitendi quarter, for instance, Elo Farm, Mvumba Farm, and Fondal Farm are major agricultural sites focusing on poultry, pig farming, and market gardening.

Farm	Activities
Elo Farm	Poultry, pig farming, market gardening
Mvumba Farm	Pig farming, market gardening
Fondal Farm	Poultry, market gardening

The commune also hosts several local markets, known locally as Wenze. Alongside these markets, a wide range of informal micro-commerce activities operate throughout the commune. Goods and services are sold from residential plots, along streets and avenues, and through small commercial structures such as kiosks, shops, terraces, and pharmacies. Additional economic activities include building-material depots, hardware stores, carpentry and plumbing workshops, garages, and quados (mechanical workshops). Busy sidewalks and intersections, often informally occupied, serve as de facto trading hubs frequented by pedestrians, drivers, cyclists, and motorcyclists. Vendors typically sell small quantities of daily necessities, including tomatoes, onions, salt, roasted peanuts, bananas, and sweets.

The hospitality sector is expanding, with several hotels established in the commune, while limited public services, including fuel stations located along National Road No. 1, support mobility and commerce. Mont Ngafula has long maintained a tourism-oriented profile. The commune hosts several of Kinshasa's most significant recreational and ecotourism sites, including Lac Ma-Vallée, Joli Camp Site, the Kimwenza Mission, Lola ya Bonobo, and the Petites Chutes de la Lukaya.

The commune is also home to several notable institutions and landmarks. These include the Loyola University of Congo, the historic Sainte Marie de Kimwenza Catholic mission, Kimbondo Pediatric Hospital, and the Mater Dei cultural and religious center. Prominent educational institutions such as Lycée Kimwenza and Elisabeth International Bilingual School serve the area, while the Faculty of Agronomic and Veterinary Science is the commune's most important center for agricultural and veterinary technical training and research.

== See also ==
- Claudine André
