= Ndjili =

Ndjili may refer to:

- Ndjili, Kinshasa, also known as N'djili or N'Djili, a commune of Kinshasa in the Democratic Republic of the Congo
- Ndjili River, a river that runs through Kinshasa
- N'djili Airport, also known as Kinshasa International Airport
