= Loyola University of Congo =

Jesuit university in Congo

- Université Loyola du Congo (French)
- Motto: Ite inflammate omnia. (Latin)
- Motto in English: Go set all afire.
- Type: Private Roman Catholic Research Non-profit Coeducational Higher education institution
- Established: 2016; 10 years ago
- Founders: Society of Jesus
- Religious affiliation: Roman Catholic (Jesuit)
- Academic affiliations: ICAM
- President: Fr. Ferdinand Muhigirwa Rusembuka, SJ
- Location: Kimwenza, Mont Ngafula, Kinshasa, Congo; 4°27′13″S 15°17′21″E
- Website: loyola.cd

Loyola University of Congo, also referred to by its acronym ULC, is a private Roman Catholic higher education institution run by the Central Africa Province of the Society of Jesus in Kinshasa, the capital city of the Democratic Republic of the Congo. It was founded by the Jesuits in 2016. The Jesuits have pursued educational efforts in Kinshasa since 1954, and have named the university after the founder of the Jesuits, Ignatius of Loyola.

== History ==
Loyola University of Congo was born out of the merger of the Agroveterinary Higher Institute (ISAV) and the Faculty of Philosophy St. Peter Canisius, both located in Kimwenza, Kinshasa. Loyola University inherited the infrastructures of these institutions. ULC organized departments of philosophy, agronomic and veterinary sciences, science and technology, social sciences and managements science, and business administration. ISAV has changed its name to Faculty of Agronomic and Veterinary Science (FSAV).

== Programs ==
FSAV does research in agriculture, veterinary, and sustainable development, where sustainability involves anthropological, social, and economic factors. It offers programs at the bachelors and masters levels. Since 2016 it has worked in conjunction with the National Institute for Professional Preparation to enhance the food processing industry.

In September 2017 Loyola announced a partnership with the French Institut catholique d'arts et métiers (ICAM) for collaboration in the training of engineers for industry.

== See also ==
- List of Jesuit sites
