= Sainte Marie de Kimwenza =

Coordinates: 4°27′21″S 15°17′14″E

Saint Mary of Kimwenza
- French: Sainte Marie de Kimwenza
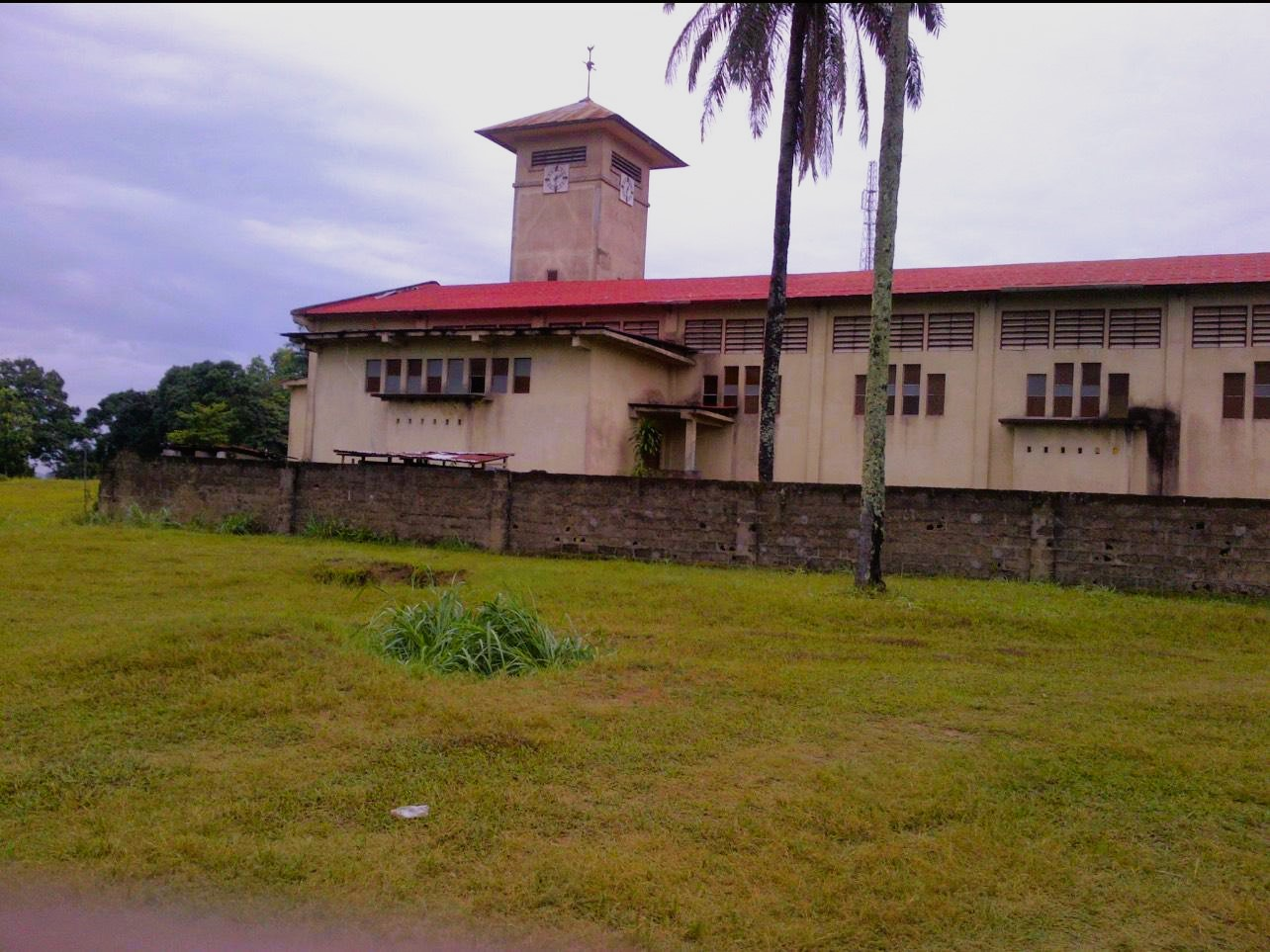
- Sainte Marie de Kimwenza in 2012
- Saint Mary of Kimwenza
- Location: Kimwenza, Mont Ngafula, Kinshasa
- Country: Democratic Republic of the Congo
- Denomination: Catholic

History
- Status: Parish Church
- Dedication: Mary Magdalene

Architecture
- Functional status: Active
- Years built: 1954; 72 years ago

The Sainte Marie de Kimwenza (meaning "Saint Mary of Kimwenza") is a Roman Catholic parish church located in the Mont Ngafula commune of the Lukunga District in Kinshasa within the western region of the Democratic Republic of the Congo (DRC). Established in 1954, the mission was initially founded by the Jesuits in 1893, and in 1894, the Sisters of Notre Dame de Namur established a girls' school. The Faculty of Agronomic and Veterinary Science has obtained all necessary official authorizations for its operation, including the acquisition of land opposite the church after a long discernment process.

== History ==
In 1893, Father Émile Van Hencxthoven, a Jesuit priest, arrived in the western part of the Kwango Mission by the end of May. He later settled in the school colony of Kimwenza, which was then baptized as the "Sainte-Marie colony." Following his settlement, he proposed a stratagem to establish twin missionary outposts along the Kwango Mission's demarcated terrain, seeking to fortify against incursions by Protestant missionaries. This proposal materialized with the founding of the Kisantu station in November 1893, a mere four months hence. Kisantu burgeoned into a strategic center for evangelical pursuits within the Kwango Mission after the abandonment of Kimwenza in 1896 and its formal closure in 1901 through a concordat with the State.

The Jesuit apostolate gained considerable influence from Kisantu, becoming a focal point for their missionary efforts. In 1895, Father Van Hencxthoven introduced the concept of secondary outposts, denominated as "chapel farms," which transformed over time into influential hubs for environmental transformation.

In 1954, a cadre of Belgian Jesuit fathers started the construction of the Saint Marie parish in Kimwenza. The construction was completed later that year.
