= Mater Dei Parish =

Religion
- Affiliation: Catholic Church
- Province: Diocese of Kisantu
- Rite: Roman Rite
- Status: Active

Location
- Location: Kimbondo, Mont Ngafula, Lukunga District
- Country: Democratic Republic of the Congo
- Interactive map of Mater Dei Parish

Architecture
- Type: Parish church
- Established: 1980; 46 years ago

Mater Dei Parish (French: Paroisse Mater Dei), also known simply as Mater Dei, is a Roman Catholic parish church located in the Kimbondo neighborhood of the Mont Ngafula commune, within the Lukunga District in Kinshasa, situated in the western region of the Democratic Republic of the Congo (DRC). It is part of the Italian Institute of Consolata Missionaries with primary hubs in Ngudia-Baka, Nsabuka, and Mitendi, along with sub-parochial outposts in Télécoms, Kimbanseke, and Masina Sans Fil. The parish commemorates its patronal feast on May 8, a tradition dating back to 1980 when Pope John Paul II made his inaugural visit to Zaire.

== History ==
The Consolata Missionaries began their mission in then-Zaire (now Democratic Republic of the Congo) in the Orientale Province (now Haut-Uélé Province) in 1972. The founding members of this mission included Fathers Tiziano Basso, Piero Manca, and Enrico Casali. They started their journey in Kinshasa, where they met with other members arriving from Brussels. Guided by Father Noé Cereda, they explored the city before splitting into groups. Giovanni Venturini, Richard Larose, and Brother Alberto Donizetti headed North to Diocese of Doruma–Dungu, while Casali Enrico, Tiziano Basso, and Pietro Manca, accompanied by an African bishop, made their way to the Diocese of Wamba. The terrain oscillated from the luxuriant equatorial wooded expanse of Wamba to the arboreal and savannah near Doruma.

The mission aimed to perpetuate the work in the Diocese of Wamba, known as the "Martyr" diocese of Zaire, where missionaries and their bishop had sacrificed their lives. Due to a shortage of personnel, the fathers took over the stewardship of the Wamba parish, aided by Father Enrico's proficiency in Swahili. In Doruma, linguistic challenges and the presence of fellow clergy augmented the intricacy of the mission. A month into their venture, they received a visit from the Vice Superior General, Fr. Guido Motter, hailing from South Africa, who validated their roles and engaged in discourse concerning their dedication to the Zairian mission. As the Consolata Missionaries solidified their foothold in the region, they actively assorted parishes and social initiatives. Notably, within Kinshasa, the establishment of Mater Dei Parish in Mont-Ngafula in the early 1980s precipitated the proliferation of sub-parochial entities.
