= Pediatric Foundation of Kimbondo =

- French: Fondation Pédiatrique de Kimbondo
- Mama Koko Orphanage
- Formation: 1989; 37 years ago
- Founder: Laura Perna and El Padre Hugo Ríos Diaz
- Type: Nonprofit
- Headquarters: Kimbondo, Mont Ngafula
- Location: Kinshasa, Democratic Republic of the Congo
- Origins: Congolese
- Methods: Aid
- Official language: French and English
- Owner: El Padre Hugo Ríos Diaz
- Leader: El Padre Hugo Ríos Diaz
- Website: http://hubforkimbondo.it/index.php/en/

The Pediatric Foundation of Kimbondo (meaning "Fondation Pédiatrique de Kimbondo"), colloquially known as Mama Koko Orphanage or Pédiatrie de Kimbondo and denoted by the acronym FPK, is a non-profit organization that provides free housing, medical care, sustenance, and education for sick, abandoned, and orphaned children. It is strategically located in the Kimbondo neighborhood of the Mont Ngafula commune, 35 km from Downtown Kinshasa in the western region of the Democratic Republic of the Congo.

== Description ==
The FPK is a healthcare organization with pavilions for assorted medical disciplines such as "general medicine, cardiology, pulmonary and skeletal tuberculosis, laboratory diagnostics, ultrasound, radiology, and [blood] transfusion". Additionally, it encompasses domiciles dedicated to the reception of abandoned and orphaned children. Approximately 60 people, predominantly parents with their children, solicit outpatient medical aid at FPK. The facility offers 200 beds for prolonged care, catering to patients with tuberculosis or cardiovascular diseases. It is the most prominent general hospital within the Mont Ngafula II health zone. The orphanage hosts nearly 500 children and adolescents.

== History ==
Established in 1989 by Laura Perna, a retired Italian university professor, and Chilean father, El Padre Hugo Ríos Diaz from the Claretian missionary, the organization began with a small free pharmacy and food assistance for needy children and families. Overcoming challenges and with donations from friends and small associations, Hugo and Perna transformed the pharmacy into a fully-fledged orphanage-hospital, locally named "Mama Koko Orphanage" in homage to Perna. In 2002, the orphanage gained legal personification and recognition as the Pediatric Foundation of Kimbondo (Fondation Pédiatrique de Kimbondo; FPK) in adherence to Congolese jurisprudence. Authorization for medical training was granted in 2000, and FPK received approval for its societal and eleemosynary operations in 2001.

=== Donations ===
Donations, such as two cargo containers from Ms. Hettinger in March 2005 and a substantial rice donation from the Italian governmental entity in May 2005, supported the hospital. In 2008, the Aid to Disadvantaged Children in Africa (AEDA) from Finland furnished the hospital with sacs of rice, sugar, and dairy products. Elikia Na Biso, a Congolese-Swedish non-profit entity, supplied disabled equipment in November 2012. In April 2014, the Swedish NGO Elikya delivered a copious consignment of medical equipment, notably consisting of a fully-equipped surgical theater, an assemblage of approximately one hundred wheelchairs, reclining chairs, and an additional 500 items tailored for people with disabilities. In December 2017, FPK inaugurated a 100-kilowatt photovoltaic installation funded by the Terna Group and numerous other corporate benefactors, valued at over £500 thousand.

== Services ==
Over time, FPK expanded its area and services, featuring four main areas. These include the hospital, which offers 200 long-term accommodations for children with tuberculosis or cardiovascular diseases. It also has shelter houses accommodating approximately 500 abandoned or orphaned kids. The institution boasts the Saint Claret School, constructed in 2009, offering free education from daycare to high school level for the little hospital guests and underprivileged children in the Mont Ngafula commune. The Pediatric Foundation of Kimbondo also manages a 900-hectare agricultural area, divided into crop production (500 hectares) and an animal farm (400 hectares), providing food for children in the hospital, school, and shelter. The river dividing the area supports the cultivation of crops, including corn, manioc, ananas, beans, sweet potatoes, as well as an experimental area for Artemisia production. Additionally, there are accommodations for farmworkers and structures for processing manioc into flour.
