= Lukaya River =

River in Democratic Republic of the Congo

Coordinates: 4.49472°S 15.2822°E

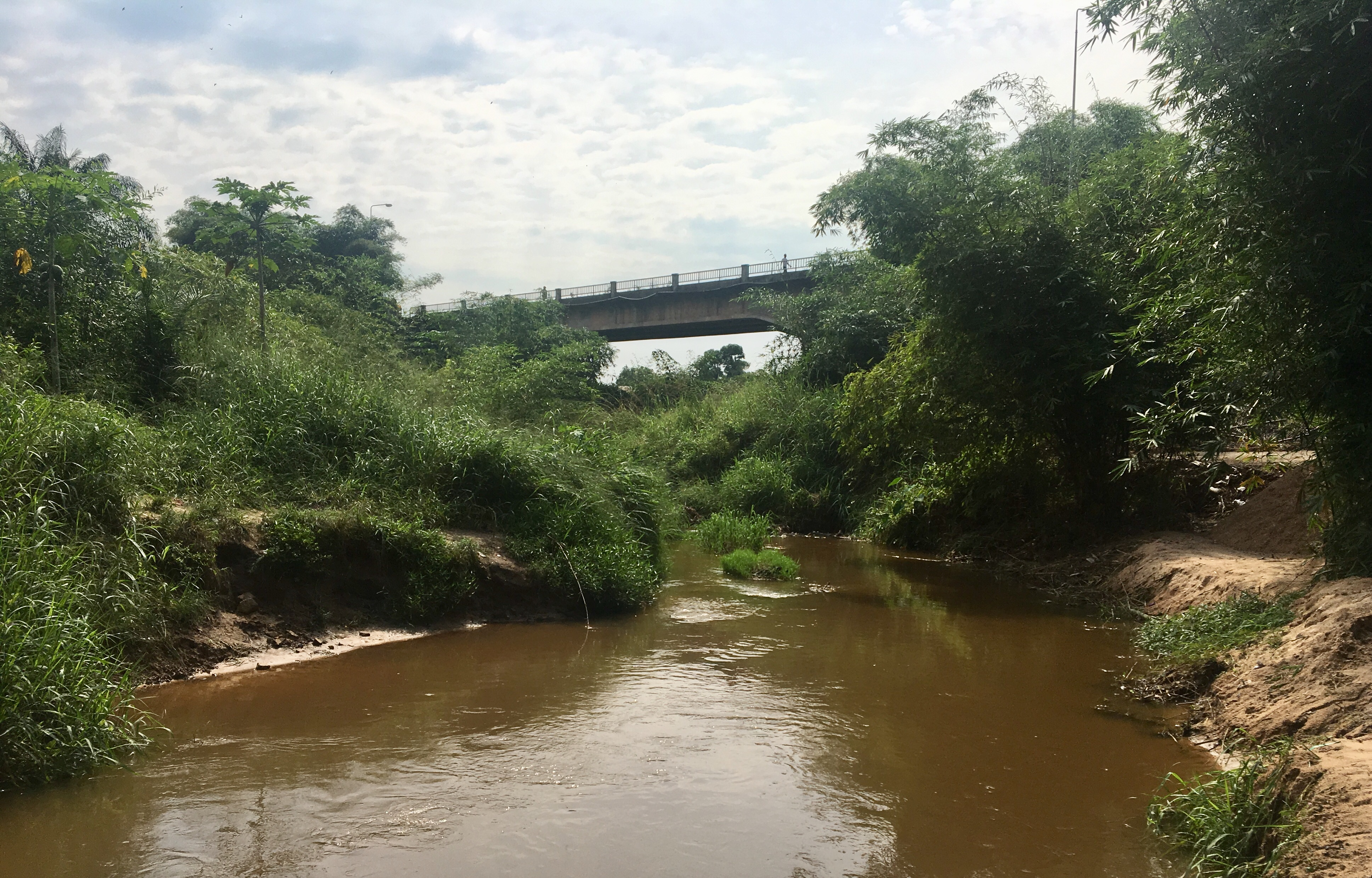
The river

The Lukaya (French: Rivière Loukaïa) is a river in the Democratic Republic of the Congo. Its source is located in the Crystal Mountains (Montagnes de Cristal), from which it runs eastward through Bas-Congo, then runs into the banks of the Ndjili River. The rail line from Matadi to Kinshasa runs along the river valley for a time, passing to the south and then to the east of Kinshasa. At one point the river was the namesake of a district in the Congo Free State.

Just to the south of Kinshasa, a small cascade on the river, the Petites Chutes de la Lukaya, is a gathering place for several tourist activities including the lake formed by the river valley, beaches and waterfalls, and the Lola Ya Bonobo Sanctuary of Kinshasa. This is located in the Mont Ngafula neighborhood, which the river runs through.

Given its proximity to Kinshasa, the Lukaya river basin has presented a flood risk for nearby communities. To counter some of the effects of flooding, UN Environment has implemented several agroforestry programs in the area. UN Environment programs have additionally improved drinking water quality by using catchment systems on the Lukaya river.

In April 2025, the Ndjili River, and its tributary, the Lukaya burst their banks after heavy rains. The flooding of the rivers led to the deaths of at least 70 people.
