= Petites Chutes de la Lukaya =

Coordinates: 4.48571°S 15.267083°E

The Petites Chutes de la Lukaya (French; "Small falls of the Lukaya") is a set of small waterfalls on the Lukaya River. They are just south of Kinshasa, the capital city of the Democratic Republic of the Congo. They are about 1 metre (3.3 ft) high.

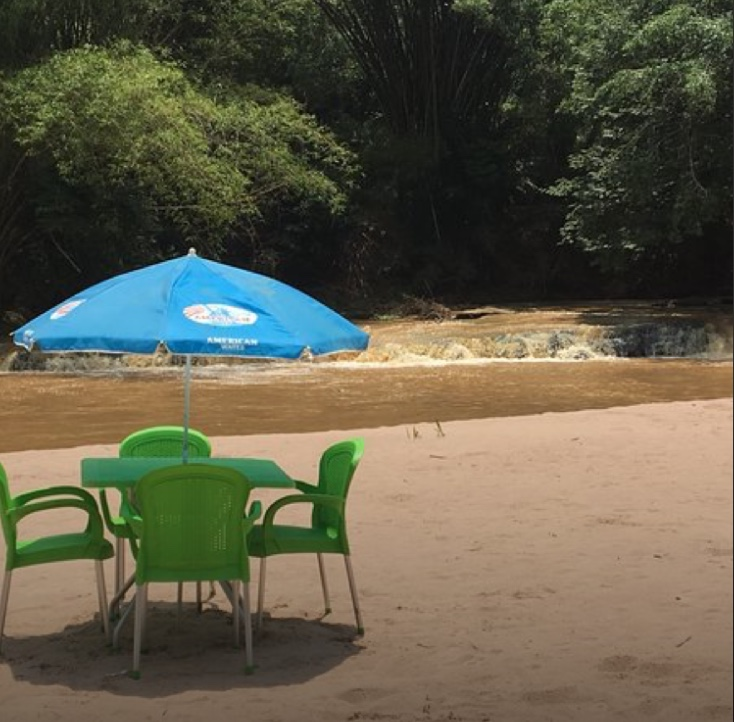
Petites chutes de la Lukaya.

During the colonial era, Jesuits who settled on the Ndjili River in June 1893 at Kimbangu, in what is now Masina, were the first Catholic missionaries in the area. Within a month of their arrival, they moved away from the unhealthy, swampy conditions that they found there to relocate to Kimwenza, near the Petites Chutes de la Lukaya.

The low waterfalls empty into a small lake with a sandy beach. They are an attraction to tourists who come to swim, or eat at the nearby restaurant. The Lola ya Bonobo sanctuary for endangered bonobos, which is adjacent to the falls, is also of interest to tourists. The sanctuary was founded by Claudine André of the NGO The Friends of Bonobos in Congo, in 1994, and has been located at the Petites Chutes de la Lukaya since 2002.
