= Faculty of Agronomic and Veterinary Science =

DR Congo development center

Coordinates: 4°27′13.15″S 15°17′21.11″E

- Merged into: Loyola University of Congo at its founding in 2016
- Established: 1994; 32 years ago
- Location: Kimwenza, Kinshasa, Democratic Republic of Congo
- Director: Ghislain T. Matadi
- Affiliations: Jesuit, Catholic

The Faculty of Agronomic and Veterinary Science (FSAV) at Loyola University of Congo dates back to Agro-Veterinary Higher Institute founded by the Society of Jesus in Kinshasa in 1994. The purpose of its founding was to further ecologically sound and sustainable food development in the central African region.

== History ==
With the founding of Loyola University of Congo in 2016, ISAV was one of the two initial faculties in the new university, and was given its present name. FSAV does research in agriculture, veterinary science, and sustainable development, where sustainability involves anthropological, social, and economic factors.

== Programs ==
- licentiate in agro-veterinary science. Masters programs are offered in agricultural forestry, food production, and agribusiness. The doctoral program takes 8 years.
- CERED is a program of FSAV which includes researchers, students, and local communities, in pursuit of a Jesuit vision for the world today.
