= Lola ya Bonobo =

Bonobo sanctuary in the Democratic Republic of the Congo

Coordinates: 04°29′13″S 15°16′05″E

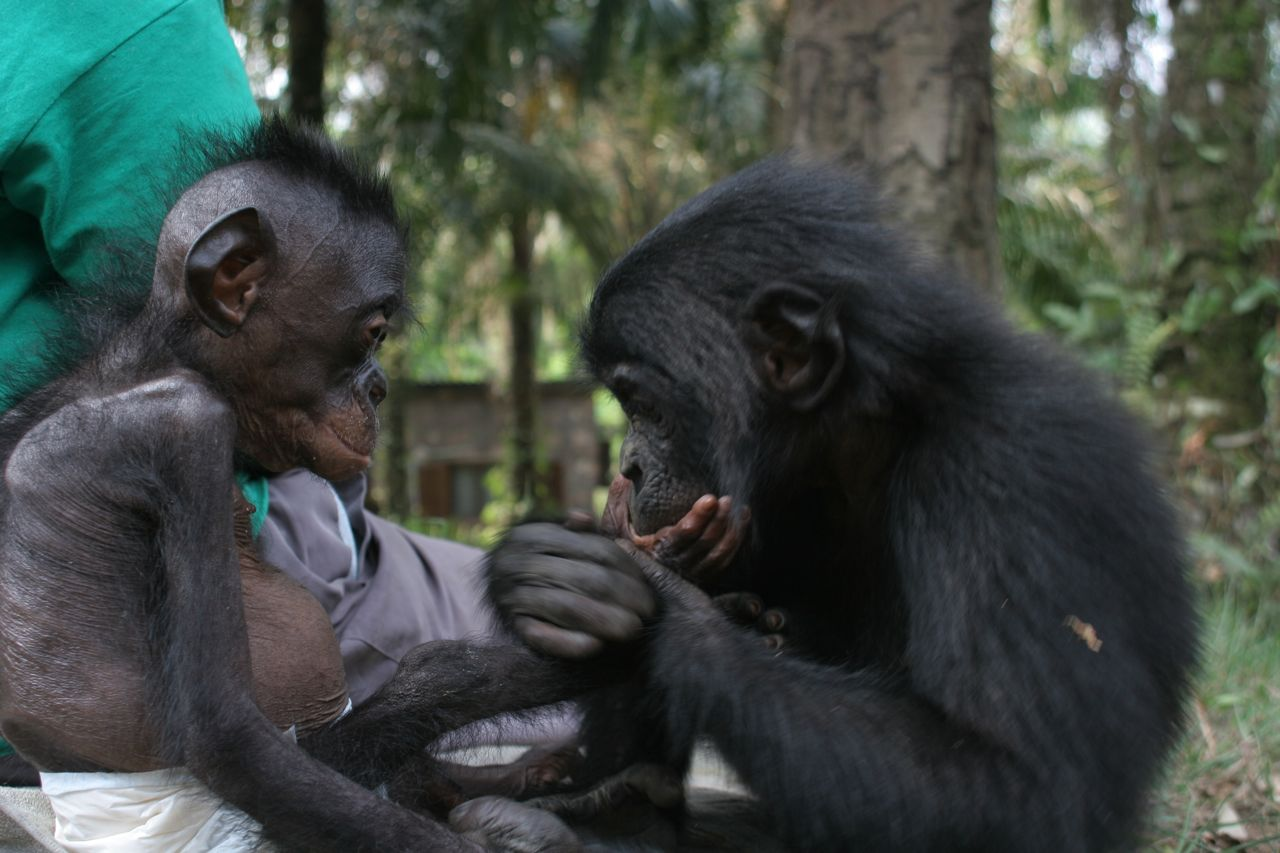
A new orphan called Lomela at Lola ya Bonobo is comforted by another bonobo.

Lola ya Bonobo is the world's only sanctuary for orphaned bonobos. Originally founded by Claudine André in 1994, since 2002 the sanctuary has been located just south of the suburb of Kimwenza at the Petites Chutes de la Lukaya, Kinshasa, in the Democratic Republic of the Congo.

Lola ya Bonobo means 'heaven for bonobos' in Lingala, a primary language of Democratic Republic of the Congo. Lola ya Bonobo is home to about 60 bonobos who live in 30 hectares of primary forest.

Lola ya Bonobo is a member of the Pan African Sanctuary Alliance.

Typically, bonobos arrive as young infants. The bushmeat trade in the Congo area sees hundreds of endangered bonobos killed each year for meat. The infants are sold as pets. When confiscated by government authorities, these young bonobos are taken to Lola ya Bonobo. They start a new life at the sanctuary with close care from a substitute human mother in quarantine. After being medically cleared and ready, they are integrated into a peer group ( in the nursery). Once they have matured sufficiently, they leave the care of substitute human mothers, and are integrated into one of the large, mixed-age social groups. These social groups are divided among several enclosures which allow them to receive care and nourishment from the team at the sanctuary, while allowing them to explore the forest and bond with each other.

Although the bonobos are captive, they live in an environment similar to the wild. They can forage among dozens of edible plants and fruiting trees, compete for mating opportunities, and learn to avoid dangers such as stepping on venomous snakes just as they would in the wild. As a result, the bonobos at the Lola ya Bonobo sanctuary, living in their forested microcosm, show all the naturally occurring behaviors observed in wild bonobos (in fact, they display some behaviors such as tool use that have not been observed in the wild).

The sanctuary plays a key role in the protection of wild bonobos because it makes possible the enforcement of domestic and international conservation laws aimed at preventing the trade in live bonobos. The sanctuary also acts as a mouthpiece for conservation efforts in DRC by educating thousands of Congolese visitors each year about the value of Congo's natural history, in particular the bonobo – their unique Congolese inheritance.

== Ekolo ya Bonobo ==
Ekolo ya Bonobo Community Reserve, which means "land of the bonobos" in Lingala, is a 117,000 acre provincial-level Protected Area in Equateur Province, 666 km from Kinshasa.

Ekolo ya Bonobo is a seasonally flooded swamp forest containing peatland and is partly contained within the Cuvette Central which is valued for carbon sequestration as well as biodiversity. It is the only protected area that is co-managed by a DRC-based nonprofit, Les Amis Des Bonobos du Congo, in partnership with local communities; Ilonga Poo, Baenga, and Lisafa.

Orphaned bonobos who have been rehabilitated at Lola ya Bonobo sanctuary are rewilded back to their natural habitat, along with their offspring.

At Ekolo, which is in Congo rainforest, bonobos are able to run free and forage as well as live together in their chosen social groups. Because Illegal wildlife trafficking and bushmeat trade continue to run rampant in Congo, forest- guards patrol the reserve daily for the safety of the bonobos and protection of the reserve.

Friends of Bonobos of Congo has completed two bonobo rewildings so far. The first took place in 2008 when 11 rehabilitated bonobos were released to Ekolo ya Bonobo, along with their offspring. The second rewilding was completed in 2022 when 14 bonobos were released to the reserve. Before being rewilded, bonobos are quarantined to prevent introduction of illness to wild populations, and provided ample time to acclimate to the freedom of the rainforest.

Including babies born to the rewilded population, about 30 known bonobos were living in Ekolo in 2023.

In June 2023, Ekolo ya Bonobo experienced a wave of unrest during which some members of a local community group that had been a partner on the project murdered 4 bonobos and set fire to installations belonging to the Friends of Bonobos of Congo conservation organization in the area around Basankusu.

== Education programs ==
Friends of Bonobos of the Congo run programs for Congolese adults and children to visit the sanctuary and learn more about Congolese biodiversity, bonobos, threats to conservation, and how to prevent bonobo extinction. A third-party study found improvement in children's attitudes toward bonobos and wildlife conservation after the launch of this initiative. Friends of Bonobos of the Congo also has education programs that target provinces where bushmeat trade is rampant. As a result of these awareness programs, educated Congolese will often alert the staff when bonobos are captured and held locally in cages or are being sold in markets.

== Visitor program ==
Lola ya Bonobo offers sanctuary tours and overnight stays in eco-lodges.

== Research conducted ==
1. Potential zoonotic pathogens hosted by endangered bonobos
2. Avoidance of Contaminated Food Correlates With Low Protozoan Infection in Bonobos
3. The Conservation Value of Lola ya Bonobo Sanctuary
4. EAZA Best Practice Guidelines - Bonobo (Pan paniscus)
5. Implicit Measures Help Demonstrate the Value of Conservation Education in the Democratic Republic of the Congo
6. The Effects of War on Bonobos and Other Nonhuman Primates in the Democratic Republic of the Congo
7. Multi-Modal Use of a Socially Directed Call in Bonobos
8. Bonobos Share with Strangers
9. Bonobo population dynamics: Past patterns and future predictions for the Lola ya Bonobo population using demographic modelling
10. Bonobos at the "Lola Ya Bonobo" Sanctuary in the Democratic Republic of the Congo
11. An Innovative Model for Detecting Interspecies Disease Transmission and Novel Pathogen Detection at Lola Ya Bonobo Sanctuary, Democratic Republic of Congo
12. Bonobos Share With Strangers Before Acquaintances
13. Flexible signalling strategies by victims mediate post-conflict interactions in bonobos
14. Assessing conservation attitudes and behaviors of Congolese children neighboring the world's first bonobo (Pan paniscus) release site
15. Bonobos Exhibit Delayed Development of Social Behavior and Cognition Relative to Chimpanzees
16. Psychological health of orphan bonobos and chimpanzees in African sanctuaries
17. Bonobos respond prosocially toward members of other groups
18. Social games between bonobos and humans: Evidence for shared intentionality?
19. On the Diversity of Malaria Parasites in African Apes and the Origin of Plasmodium falciparum from Bonobos.
20. Bonobos have a more human-like second-to-fourth finger length ratio (2D:4D) than chimpanzees: a hypothesized indication of lower prenatal androgens
21. Tolerance allows bonobos to outperform chimpanzees in a cooperative task

== Films ==
1. Bonobos: Back to the wild
2. The story of Lola ya Bonobo
3. Things You Probably Didn't Know About Cute Bonobos
4. Sex and Fruit: The Sweet Life of Bonobos
5. Lola Ya Bonobo - Le paradis des bonobos
6. Save the bonobos!
7. The Mamas of Lola ya Bonobo
8. The world's first bonobo release!
9. Bonobos
10. En RDC, cette réserve est un sanctuaire pour les bonobos
11. CUTE! Ticklish Bonobo Can't Stop Laughing

== Friends of Bonobos ==
Friends of Bonobos is a US 501(c)(3) charity that supports Lola ya Bonobo sanctuary and all the activities of its parent organization, Amis des Bonobos du Congo. It was founded by Claudine André and Dominique Morel. Friends of Bonobos also raises awareness for bonobos globally. Friends of Bonobos is located in Durham, North Carolina.
