= Claudine André =

Belgian conservationist (born 1946)

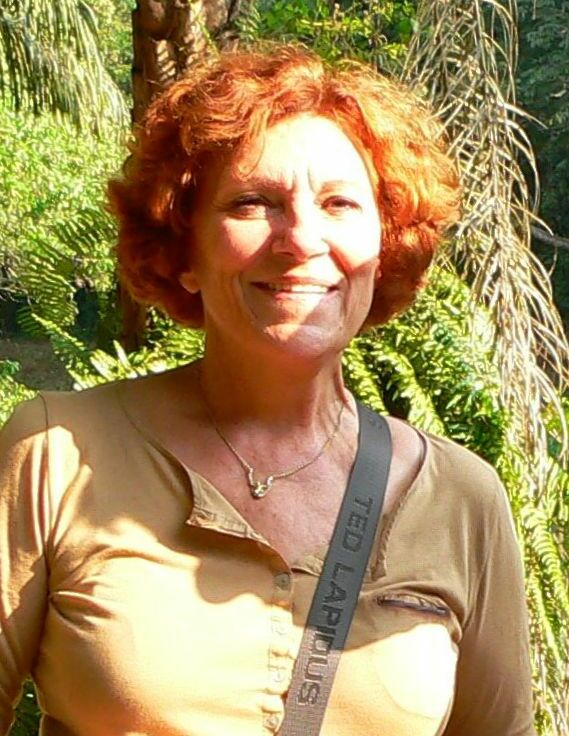
- Claudine André at Lola ya Bonobo, Kinshasa, 2012
- Born: 6 November 1946 (age 79); La Hestre, Hainaut, Belgium
- Known for: Study of bonobos, conservation, animal welfare
- Awards: Prince Laurent Prize (Belgium), National Order of Merit (France), Badham-Evans Award for Women's Commitment to Wildlife (Twycross Zoo, England)
- Scientific career
- Workplaces: Lola ya Bonobo, Kinshasa, Congo

Claudine André (born 6 November 1946), is a Belgian conservationist. She founded Lola ya bonobo in 1994, which is a bonobo sanctuary, just south of Kinshasa, at Mont Ngafula, in the Lukaya Valley, Democratic Republic of Congo.

The aim of the sanctuary is to collect young bonobos, most having been orphaned due to the actions of poachers, and eventually reintroduce them into a forest reserve. During the same year, Claudine André started the Friends of Animals in the Congo, of which she is still president.

== Early life ==
André was born in Hainaut Province, Belgium, and arrived in Congo as a child, with her father, who was a veterinary surgeon, and has lived there ever since. She ran an art boutique, sourcing and selling rare art works. She married Victor and has five children.

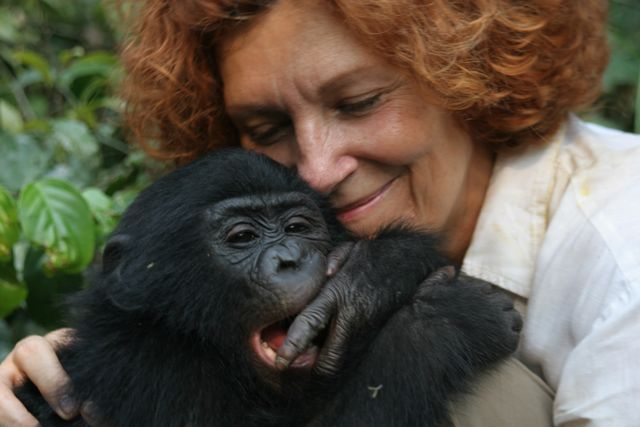
André with a bonobo

When war disrupted daily life in Kinshasa, the capital city of the Democratic Republic of Congo, in the 1990s, André worked as a volunteer in Kinshasa Zoo, because the animals had been neglected and were starving. Elsewhere in the country, people were finding traditional food production difficult, because of the war, and turned instead to bushmeat to feed themselves and their families. This in turn led to orphaned bonobos turning up for sale on the streets of Kinshasa - and it was from this situation that André started Lola ya bonobo.

== Bibliography ==
- Claudine André, Une tendresse sauvage, Calmann-Lévy, Paris, 2006. ISBN 2-7021-3594-3
- Claudine André, Lola ya Bonobo : Le paradis des Bonobos - République Démocratique du Congo, Éditions Oka, Paris, 2010. ISBN 978-2-9537298-0-1

== See also ==
- Lola ya Bonobo
- List of animal rights activists
