= Ndjili, Kinshasa =

Ndjili N'Djili
- Commune
- Commune de Ndjili
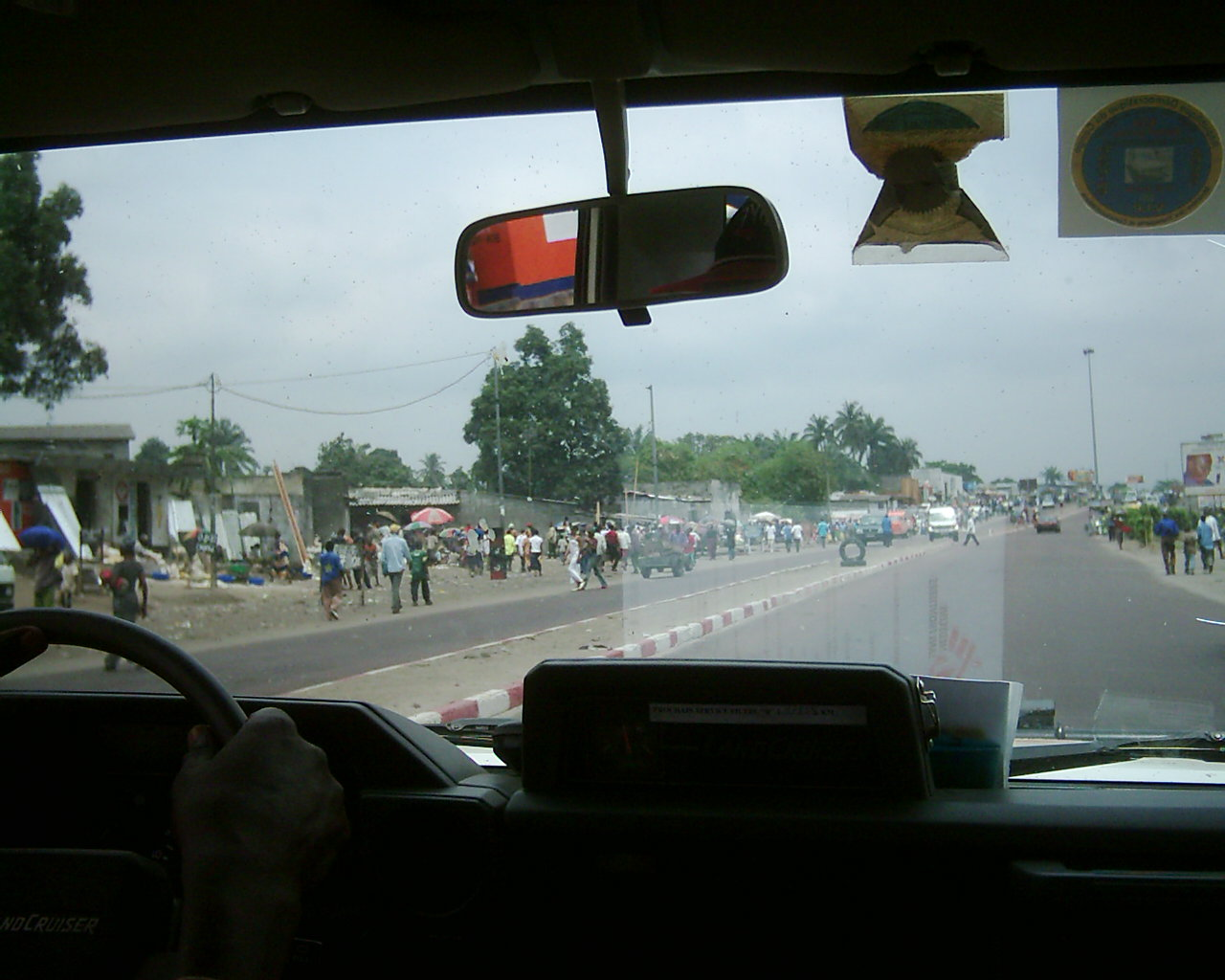
- A view of Lumumba Boulevard in Ndjili
- Ndjili on map of Kinshasa city-province
- Location in DR Congo
- Coordinates: 4°24′32″S 15°22′39″E
- Country: DR Congo
- City-Province: Kinshasa

Area
  - Total: 11.4 km^{2} (4.4 sq mi)
- Elevation: 327 m (1,073 ft)

Population (2015 est.)
  - Total: 1,157,619
  - Density: 102,000/km^{2} (263,000/sq mi)

Ndjili (also spelled N'Djili) is a commune in the Tshangu District of Kinshasa. Named after the Ndjili River, which forms its western boundary, the commune covers an area of approximately 11.4 square kilometers and had an estimated population of 1,157,619 as of 2015, making it the fifth-most populous commune. Ndjili is connected to the city center by Lumumba Boulevard, a major 13-kilometer-long highway.

Officially established by ministerial decree no. 69/0042 on 23 January 1969, the commune's boundaries are demarcated by prominent natural and infrastructural features: Lumumba Boulevard to the north (bordering Masina), the Nsanga River to the east (bordering Kimbanseke), President Mobutu Avenue and Kumbi Street to the south, and the Ndjili River to the west (bordering Kisenso and Matete).

Administratively, the commune is divided into 13 quartiers (quarters), of which six are urbanized in accordance with planning standards, while the remainder are informal settlements. Each quartier is further subdivided into avenues. Ndjili's economy is largely informal and centered around markets, workshops, tailoring houses, and small-scale agriculture, with vegetable distribution supported by the Union des Coopératives des Maraîchers de Kinshasa (UCOOPMAKIN), established in 1953. Though not industrial, the commune is renowned for its skilled auto mechanics, popularly referred to as bana N'djili. It also hosts branches of the Peace Court of Kinshasa, the High Court Prosecutor's Office, and the Kinshasa High Court.

== Geography ==
=== Terrain ===
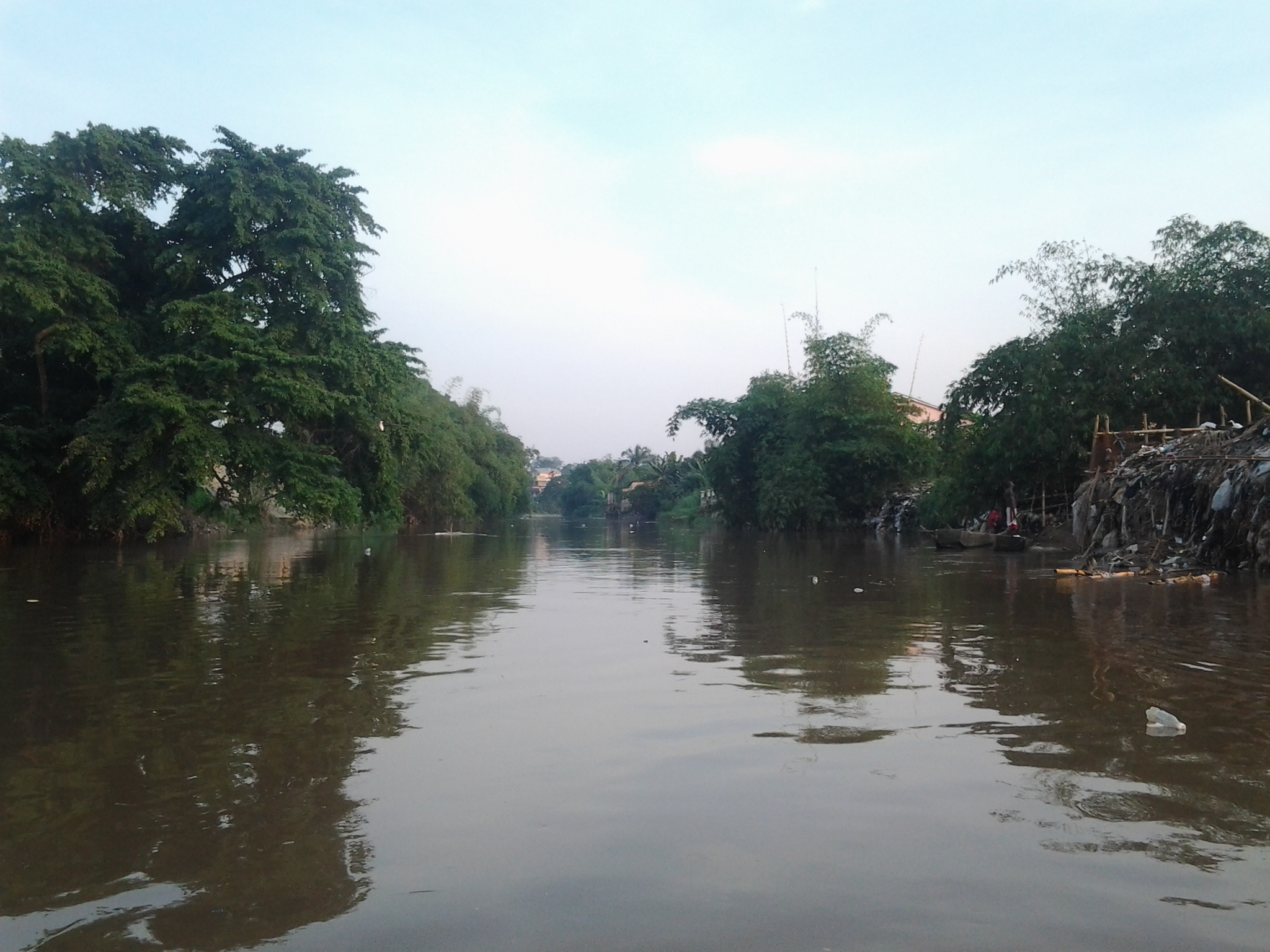
The Ndjili River flowing through a lush, vegetated landscape

Ndjili is situated in the eastern part of Kinshasa and functions as a key point of attraction within the city's southern zone. Geographically, the commune is delineated by prominent natural and infrastructural boundaries: to the north, it is bordered by Lumumba Boulevard, which separates it from Masina; to the east, the Nsanga River forms the boundary with Kimbanseke; to the south, the Kumbi axis leads to the intersection of Avenue Président Mobutu and Rue Kulbi, extending to the Ndjili River; and to the west, the Ndjili River demarcates its limit with Kimbanseke and Matete.

The terrain of Ndjili is predominantly sandy, with notable geotechnical characteristics observed at the site of the former Centre de Commercialisation des Produits Maraîchers (CECOMAF), now known as Union des Coopératives des Maraîchers de Kinshasa (UCOOPMAKIN). The local clayey soil exhibits a high natural moisture content (over 15%) and a clay fraction of 17%, with a plasticity index of 12. The material has a compressive strength (Rc28) of 3.81 MPa, a flexural strength (Rf28) of 1.01, and a density of 1,677 kg/m³, making it significant in local construction and agricultural activities.

=== Government ===
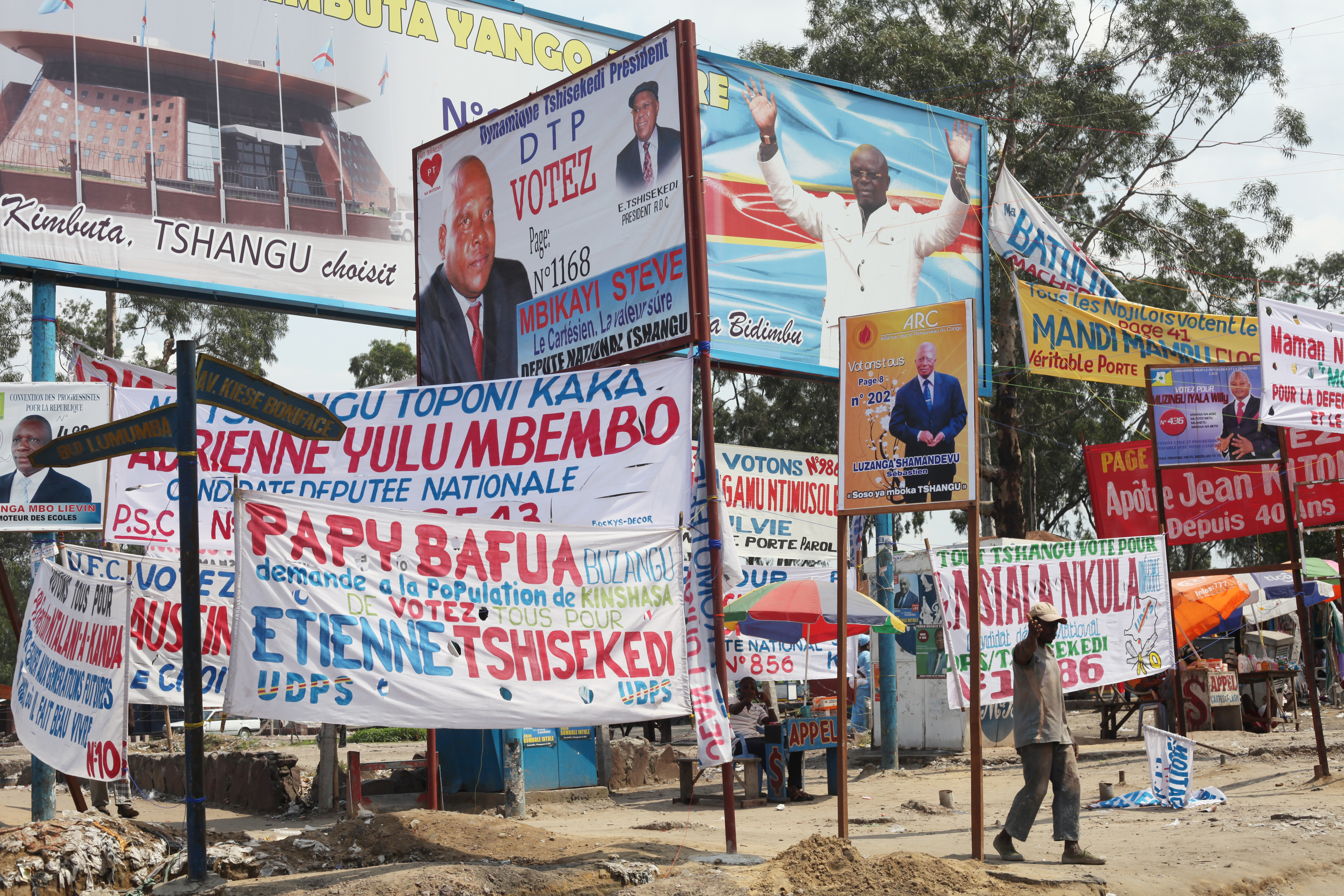
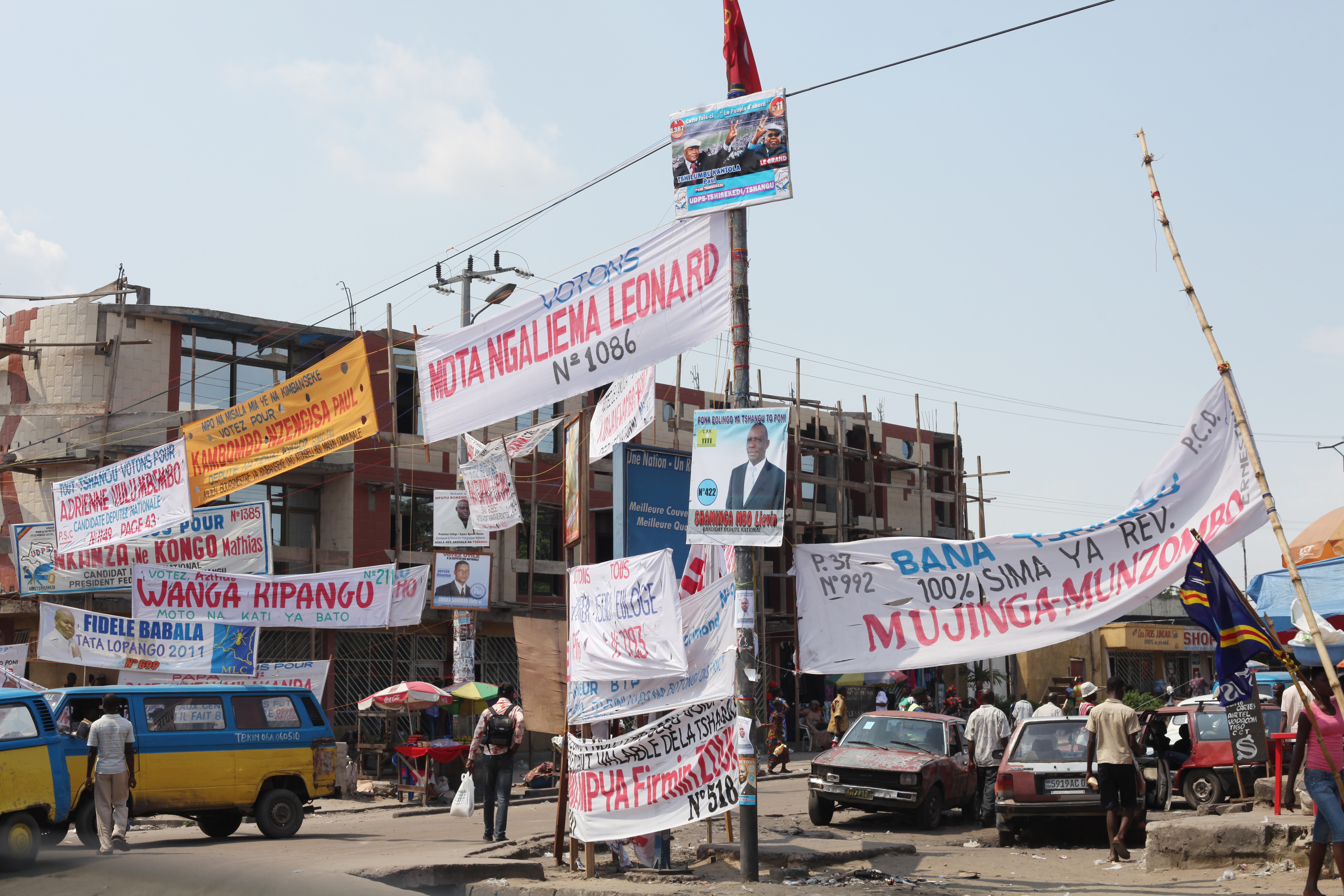
Political campaign posters and banners densely displayed in Ndjili in the lead-up to the 2011 general elections, prominently expressing support for Étienne Tshisekedi and the Union for Democracy and Social Progress (UDPS).

Ndjili is governed through a dual structure comprising the Municipal Council and the Municipal Executive College. The Municipal Council serves as the commune's legislative body and consists of elected councilors, while the Executive College is responsible for the day-to-day administration and the implementation of council decisions. The Executive College includes the Mayor, Deputy Mayor, and two Municipal Aldermen. The Mayor, appointed by decree of the Governor of Kinshasa following municipal elections, acts as the chief executive, judicial police officer, and civil status registrar. The Mayor also exercises budgetary authority and has command over local units of the National Police.

In situations requiring immediate action, the Mayor may, in consultation with the Executive College, issue municipal regulations enforceable by fines or short-term detention. These decrees serve to maintain public order and ensure the effective governance of the commune.

Ndjili is subdivided into 13 quartiers (quarters), of which seven meet formal urban planning standards, while six are considered non-urbanized or informal settlements.

Quartiers
1.	Quartier 1
2.	Quartier 2 (also known as Bilombe)
3.	Quartier 3
4.	Quartier 4
5.	Quartier 5
6.	Quartier 6
7.	Quartier 7
8.	Quartier 8
9.	Quartier 9
10.	Quartier 10
11.	Quartier 11
12.	Quartier 12
13.	Quartier 13

== History ==
Ndjili is one of the older communes in Kinshasa that were part of a structured urban planning initiative during the Belgian colonial era, alongside communes such as Bandalungwa, Lemba, and Matete. Originally under the jurisdiction of Kasangulu Territory, Ndjili was officially recognized as an annexed urban zone by royal decree on 26 May 1957. Its territorial boundaries were formally established by Decree No. 69/0042 of 23 January 1969, issued by the Minister of Internal and Customary Affairs. At its inception, the commune was designed to accommodate seven quartiers; today, it comprises thirteen.

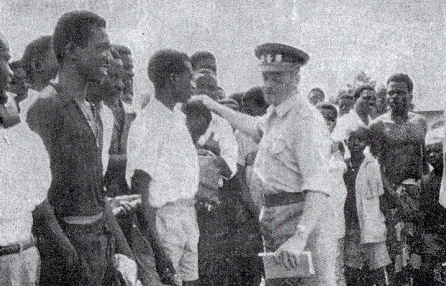
General Émile Janssens engaging with Ndjili residents in 1959 during a comprehensive tour of Léopoldville communes in the aftermath of the Léopoldville riots

Ndjili's early settlement included Bantu-speaking Humbu and Teke communities, particularly those from the village of Kimbangu—now known as PETRO-CONGO—under the leadership of a traditional chief named Ngangwele. The rapid population growth of Léopoldville (now Kinshasa) during the colonial period prompted the Belgian administration to establish new subdivisions to ease overcrowding in central communes such as Barumbu, Kinshasa, Kintambo, and Saint Jean (now Lingwala). Early efforts resulted in the development of new areas like Dendale (now Kasa-Vubu), Ngiri-Ngiri, and Kalamu.

Despite these efforts, urban congestion persisted, prompting the colonial government around 1952–53 to create an additional indigenous settlement called the Centre Extra Coutumier of Ndjili (C.E.C.), named after the adjacent Ndjili River. The site was initially developed with 6,000 residential plots, with housing allocated under strict eligibility criteria: residents had to hold valid permits, be married with at least three children, and have a clean record. These policies earned Ndjili the nickname Mboka ya Tata na Bana—meaning "town of fathers with children"—and led to a large migration from central Kinshasa communes, which were facing a severe housing shortage.

== Infrastructure ==
Ndjili hosts several important public institutions, including branches of the Peace Court of Kinshasa, the High Court Prosecutor's Office, and the Kinshasa High Court. The administrative headquarters, along with the local police station, post office, and a municipal market, are located in Quartier 7. Nearby, across Lumumba Boulevard in Masina, stands the Marché de la Liberté, a modern commercial complex.

Other key neighborhoods include Quartier 6, home to Wenzé ya 6 market, Saint Martin Cathedral, the Salvation Army's Bomoyi Health Center, and CADECO (formerly CADEZA). Quartier 2, known as Bilombe, and adjacent Quartier 3 are notable for vegetable farming activities, especially through centers like MAC and CECOMAF (Centre de Commercialisation des Produits Maraîchers), now operating as UCOOPMAKIN (Union des Coopératives des Maraîchères de Kinshasa).

== Economy ==
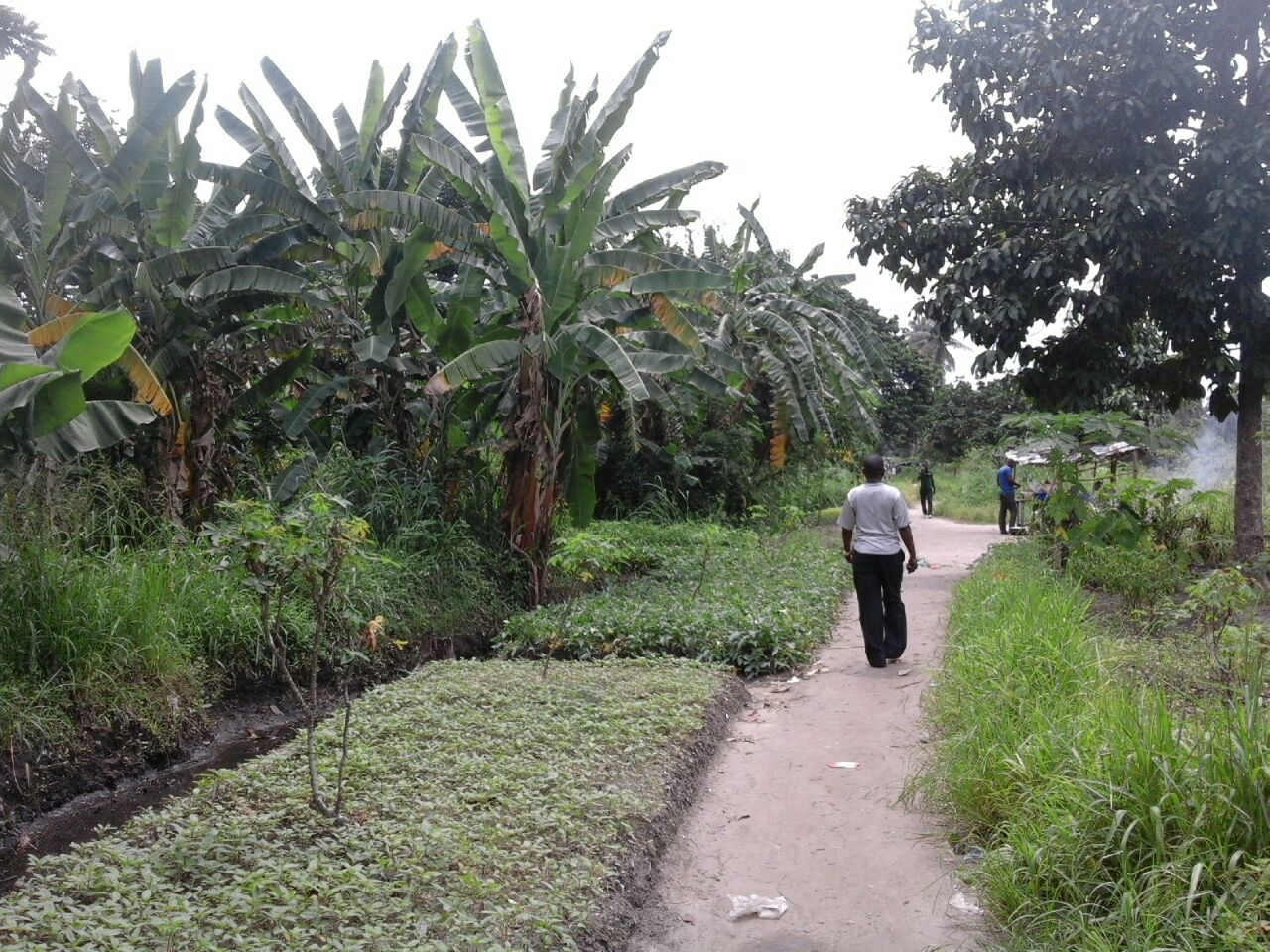
Lush green vegetation and clusters of banana trees in Ndjili

The commune's economy is predominantly informal, with livelihoods centered around market trade, artisanal workshops, tailoring houses, small-scale agriculture, and services. Despite its urban character, the commune maintains significant agricultural activity, especially in its eastern and central sectors, where the presence of the Ndjili, Nsanga, and Lukasi rivers support crop cultivation and horticulture. A notable agricultural zone is Bilombe, which, along with Quartier 3, hosts some of the commune's most active vegetable farming centers. The Union des Coopératives des Maraîchers de Kinshasa (UCOOPMAKIN), formerly the Centre de Commercialisation des Produits Maraîchers (CECOMAF), is headquartered in Bilombe. CECOMAF was established in 1953 by Mr. Devordeker, before the official creation of the commune, drawing resources from the MAC in Quartier 8 and a market gardening center located along the Ndjili River. It played a central role in the supply of fresh produce such as vegetables, fruits, and cassava to the commune and surrounding areas. After its destruction during the 1991 looting amid unrest in Zaire, the center underwent rehabilitation and was officially re-inaugurated as UCOOPMAKIN by President Joseph Kabila on 4 June 2002. The area's tropical climate and fertile soil also support the growth of fruit trees, including mango, avocado, banana, lemon, and apple varieties. However, environmental challenges such as erosion—particularly in Districts 8 and 9—pose ongoing threats to both infrastructure and agricultural land, often exacerbated by inadequate drainage and blocked gutters. The commune also benefits from the activities of the Association Agricole pour le Développement (AGAD), which has been engaged in community-based agricultural development since its establishment in 2007. AGAD implements programs aimed at boosting food production and promoting sustainable farming practices in the region.

While the commune is not formally designated as an industrial zone, it has garnered citywide acclaim for its adept auto-repair mechanics—colloquially referred to as bana Ndjili—who are reputed for their technical prowess in restoring automobiles to near-original condition. Additional economic activity includes the operation of various informal markets, including Wenzé ya 6 in Quartier 6 and a municipal market in Quartier 7, as well as small businesses such as tailoring shops and local cold rooms.

== Demographics ==
As of a 2015 demographic estimate, the commune of Ndjili had a population of approximately 1,157,619 inhabitants.

Historical population
Year	1967	1970	1985	2003	2004
Pop.	80,000	102,881	157,010	427,583	442,138
±%	—	+28.6%	+52.6%	+172.3%	+3.4%

=== Health ===
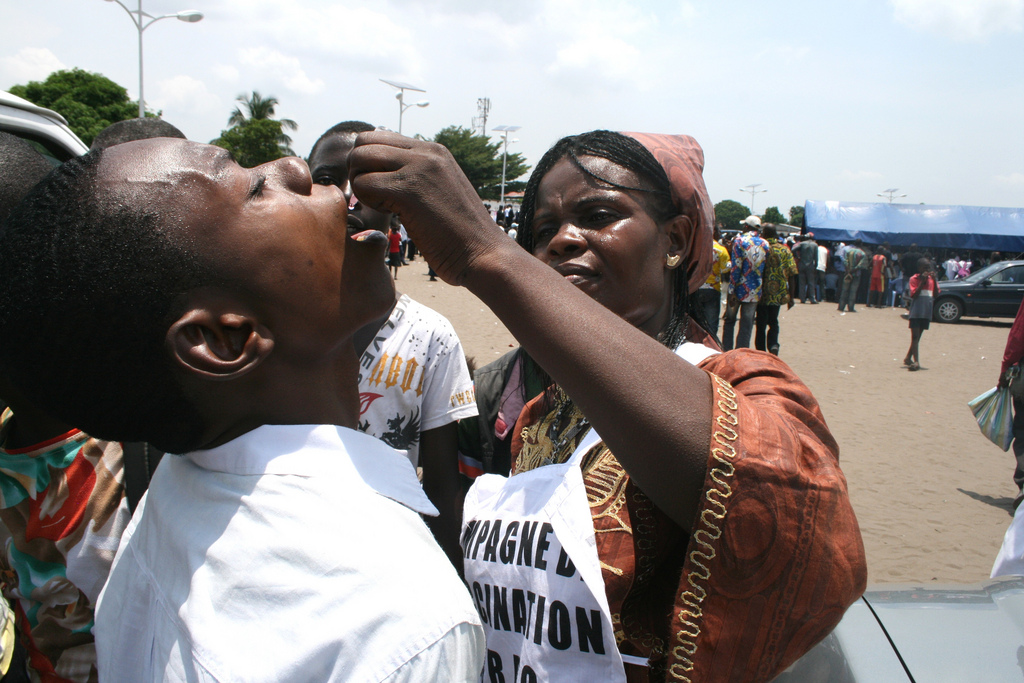
A health worker administers an oral polio vaccine to a young boy in a public outdoor setting in Ndjili as part of a USAID-supported polio eradication initiative in the DRC.

Healthcare provision in Ndjili falls under the jurisdiction of the Zone de Santé Urbaine de Ndjili (Urban Health Zone of Ndjili), which operates in alignment with the Democratic Republic of the Congo's national policy on primary healthcare. The zone aims to promote equitable access to medical services, both geographically and economically, for all residents. Governance is entrusted to a Médecin Chef de Zone (Chief Medical Officer), supported by a multidisciplinary Equipe Cadre de la Zone de Santé (Health Zone Management Team), which oversees functions such as administration, immunization campaigns, pharmaceutical logistics, community outreach, sanitation, and nutritional programs.

The health zone comprises 13 designated health areas, 11 of which are currently operational. Key healthcare institutions is the Hôpital Général de Référence de Ndjili (Ndjili General Referral Hospital) and Hôpital De l'Amitié Sino-Congolaise (Sino-Congolese Friendship Hospital), a hospital established through DRC–China relations. The Ndjili General Referral Hospital is structured in a pavilion style, with three pavilions housing various departments and services. Pavilion 1 includes the central reception, movement and statistics units, internal medicine, intensive care, adult and pediatric emergencies, laboratory services (including blood banking), radiology, physiotherapy, and laundry facilities. Pavilion 2 contains the operating room, pediatrics, anesthesiology, delivery and maternity wards, dentistry, hospital management offices, budget control, the central cash desk, treasury, pharmacy, internship programs, and care coordination units. Pavilion 3 is dedicated to surgical services, gynecology-obstetrics, maternity care, technical services such as maintenance and electricity, the community health program (CPN), pharmaceutical depot, morgue, and hygiene facilities.

=== Education ===
The educational infrastructure is extensive, encompassing early childhood, primary, and secondary levels. During the 2003–2004 academic year, the commune was served by sixty-two nursery schools, which collectively housed ninety-four classrooms and enrolled a total of 2,451 boys and 1,281 girls. These nurseries employed an equal number of male and female instructors, each numbering ninety-eight. The primary education system comprised three hundred twenty-six schools, with a total of 2,812 classrooms, serving 108,792 boys and 54,644 girls. These schools were staffed by a substantial teaching workforce of 28,757 male and 1,042 female teachers. The secondary education sector included two hundred twenty-five schools, offering 2,227 classrooms and educating 57,400 boys and 28,757 girls. The teaching staff at this level consisted of 3,084 male and 321 female educators.

Despite the generally extensive educational infrastructure, some schools such as EP Kwilu and EP Kamina in Quartier 1, EP Sumbi in Quartier 3, EP Likasi in Quartier 6, and EP Yanda in Quartier 13 have been reported to be in a state of deterioration. Despite such constraints, Ndjili hosts several notable secondary institutions, including Collège Bonsomi (specializing in mathematical physics, biochemistry, and pedagogy), the Institut Technique Industriel de Ndjili (ITI-Ndjili), the Institut Pédagogique Lemfu situated in Quartier 6, the Lycée Sainte Germaine (formerly the Lycée du 27 Octobre in N'Djili), the Institut Biochimie, Insitut technique Agricole de Ndjili, Institut Makinette, and the Lycée Professionnel Bomengo, which emphasizes vocational education such as tailoring. Additional skill-building opportunities are provided through local trade centers (centres de métiers), while the non-governmental organization Oasis N'djili has supported educational efforts by establishing two public libraries in 2003.

== Transport ==
It is served by a station on the Matadi-Kinshasa Railway. An agreement was made with Belgium in 2007 to upgrade this line.

== See also ==
- List of railway stations in the Democratic Republic of the Congo
