= Kimwenza =

- Location within Democratic Republic of the Congo
- Coordinates: 4°27′32″S 15°17′19″E

Kimwenza is a neighborhood in the Democratic Republic of the Congo in the Mont Ngafula commune in the south of the capital, Kinshasa.

== Location ==
Kimwenza is on a plateau above the main city of Kinshasa. It is near to the Petites Chutes de la Lukaya. It is a station on the Matadi–Kinshasa Railway, built between 1890 and 1898 to connect Matadi with Kinshasa, bypassing the unnavigable Livingstone Falls.

== Religious establishments ==
In June 1893, Jesuits settled on the Ndjili River in what is now Masina. They were the first Catholic missionaries in the area. Within a month they moved away from the unhealthy, swampy conditions that they found, to Kimwenza. The Saint Mary's mission, founded in July 1893, included a school to train African boys destined for the army or the priesthood. The Jesuits felt it was essential for nuns to come and work with the local women and children, believing that Christianity would only take root if the women of the family were believers. The Sisters of Our Lady of Namur set up a school there, in 1894.

By 1900, the Jesuit priests were educating 100 boys, and the nuns had 169 girls. While the priests always saw one of their goals as being to educate trainee priests, the sisters were at first only concerned with teaching Christianity to future wives and mothers. In the early 1920s, local women also began to ask to join the sisters. The mission was the origin for numerous religious houses and schools. The Lycée de Kimwenza is now one of the best regarded schools of the city. The Soeurs Clarisses had a convent at Kimwenza. During the troubles of 1996, it was ransacked by Rwandan soldiers.

== University ==
In October 1951 the Kisantu University was moved to Kimwenza. The new location had the advantage of being closer to Leopoldville. However, a site further north about 300 hectares (740 acres) in size on the crest called Mont Amba had the advantage of being even closer to the city, and in April 1952 the governor general Eugène Jungers ceded ownership of the site to the university. In July 1954 the university was placed under the direction of the Jesuits of the Catholic University of Louvain, and named Lovanium University. While the Jesuits aimed to educate an African elite, the Belgian colonial administration was hostile to this goal, and it was only in 1956 that they recognized the university. After independence it was to become the University of Kinshasa.

== Lola ya Bonobo sanctuary ==
Since 2002, the Lola ya Bonobo sanctuary, founded by Claudine André, has been located just south of Kimwenza at the Petites Chutes de la Lukaya. Bonobos are an endangered species which only exist in the Democratic Republic of Congo in the wild. They are the great ape most closely related to humans, and even more intelligent than chimpanzees.

Lola ya Bonobo means 'paradise for bonobos' in Lingala, the main language of Kinshasa. In 2012, Lola ya Bonobo was home to 60 bonobos who live in 30 hectares of primary forest.

Typically, bonobos arrive as young infants. The bushmeat trade in Congo sees hundreds of bonobos killed each year for meat and the infants are sold as pets. When confiscated, these infant bonobos are taken to Lola ya Bonobo. They begin life at the sanctuary with close care from a substitute human mother, but are usually quickly ready to be integrated into a peer group, and shortly afterwards into one of the large mixed-age social groups.

== Sources ==
- Burke, Joan F. (2001). These Catholic sisters are all mamas!: towards the inculturation of the sisterhood in Africa : an ethnographic study. BRILL. ISBN 90-04-11930-2.
- Kamatenda, Djungu-Simba (2001). La fin des haricots: chronique congolaise. Editions L'Harmattan. ISBN 2-7475-0364-X.
- Mpey-Nka, Richard Ngub'Usim (2010). Pour la refondation de l'Université de Kinshasa et du Congo: faut-il recréer un Lovanium?. Editions L'Harmattan. ISBN 978-2-296-12045-7.
- Mboka, Mwana (January 29, 2011). "Kinshasa Then and Now".
- Muketa, Jacques Fumunzanza (2008). Kinshasa. Editions L'Harmattan. p. 284. ISBN 978-2-296-07658-7.
- Ntima, Kavenadiambuko Ngemba (1999). La Methode D'Evangelisation Des Redemptoristes Belges Au Bas-Congo, 1899-1919. Gregorian&Biblical BookShop. ISBN 88-7652-829-6.
