= National Road 1 (Democratic Republic of the Congo) =

Road in the Democratic Republic of the Congo

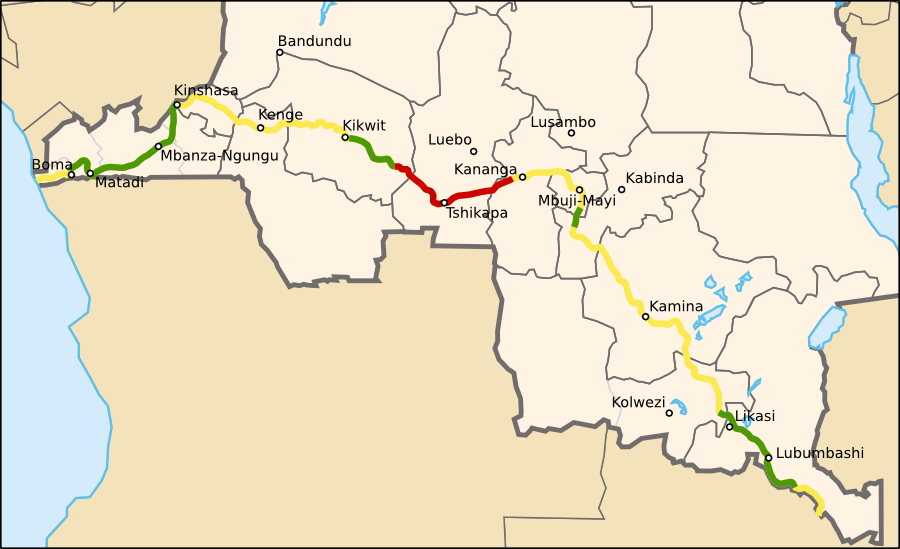

Route information
- Length: 3,130 km (1,940 mi)

Major junctions
- West end: Moanda on the Atlantic Ocean
- East end: T3 at the Kasumbalesa border with Zambia

Location
- Country: Democratic Republic of the Congo
- Provinces: Kongo Central, Kinshasa, Kwango, Kwilu, Kasaï, Kasaï-Central, Kasaï-Oriental, Lomami, Haut-Lomami, Lualaba, Haut-Katanga
- Major cities: Kinshasa, Kananga, Mbuji-Mayi, Lubumbashi

Highway system
- Transport in the Democratic Republic of the Congo

National Road No. 1 is a major highway in the Democratic Republic of the Congo. It runs from the western port of Banana though the cities of Kinshasa, Kananga, Mbuji-Mayi, Lubumbashi, and ends at Kasumbalesa in the southeast of the country where it connects with the T3 road in Zambia. The road contains the Matadi Bridge, the largest bridge in the country, which spans the Congo River.

Route (east to west)
Place	Province
Moanda	Kongo Central
Boma	Kongo Central
Kinzau-Mvuete	Kongo Central
Matadi	Kongo Central
Kenge	Kongo Central
Kimpese	Kongo Central
Lukala	Kongo Central
Mbanza-Ngungu	Kongo Central
Kisantu	Kongo Central
Kasangulu	Kongo Central
Kinshasa	Kinshasa
Kenge	Kwango
Masi-Manimba	Kwilu
Kikwit	Kwilu
Kilembe	Kwilu
Tshikapa	Kasaï
Bulungu	Kasaï-Central
Kananga	Kasaï-Central
Mbuji-Mayi	Kasaï-Oriental
Mwene-Ditu	Lomami
Luputa	Lomami
Lusuku	Lomami
Kaniama	Haut-Lomami
Kamina	Haut-Lomami
Mulungwishi	Haut-Katanga
Lwambo	Haut-Katanga
Likasi	Haut-Katanga
Lubumbashi	Haut-Katanga
Kasumbalesa	Haut-Katanga

== Rebuilding ==
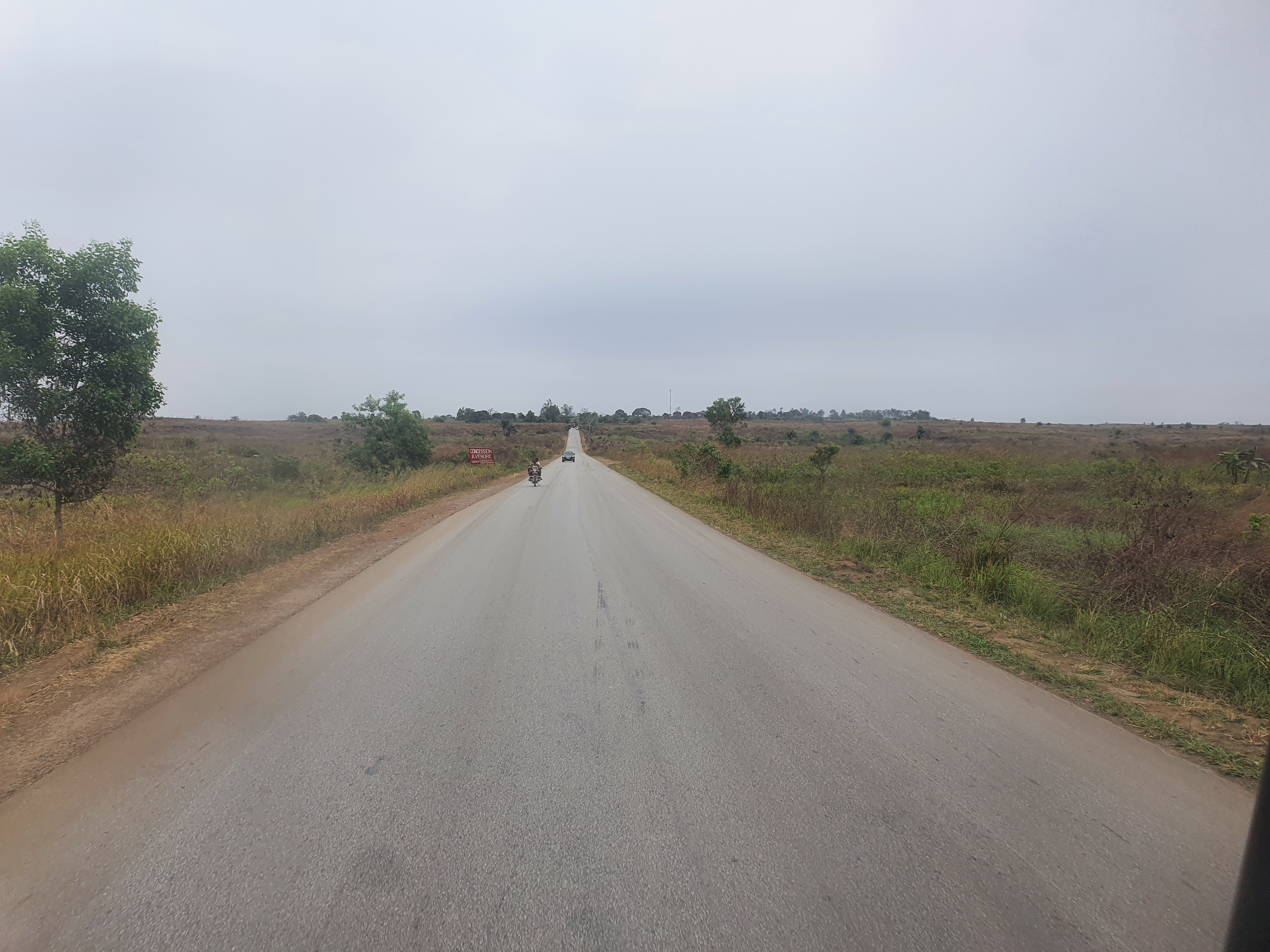
National Road No. 1 as seen in 2025

In 2008, following the Sicomines minerals for infrastructure deal, the DRC awarded a no bid contract to China Railway rebuild several sections of the N1 and collect tolls. According to banking data made public by the Congo Hold-Up leaks, some of the toll revenue was redirected to the relatives and entourage of then president Joseph Kabila.

In 2019, the African Development Bank provided a XUA 50,570,000 loan to rehabilitate the section between Kinshasa and Batshamba, which was completed in 2021. In 2022, the ADB approved another $250 million for the section between Mbuji-Mayi and Kananga.

== See also ==
- National Road 2 (Democratic Republic of the Congo)
