= Boulevard du 30 Juin =

Coordinates: 4.3028°S 15.3117°E

- Boulevard of June 30th
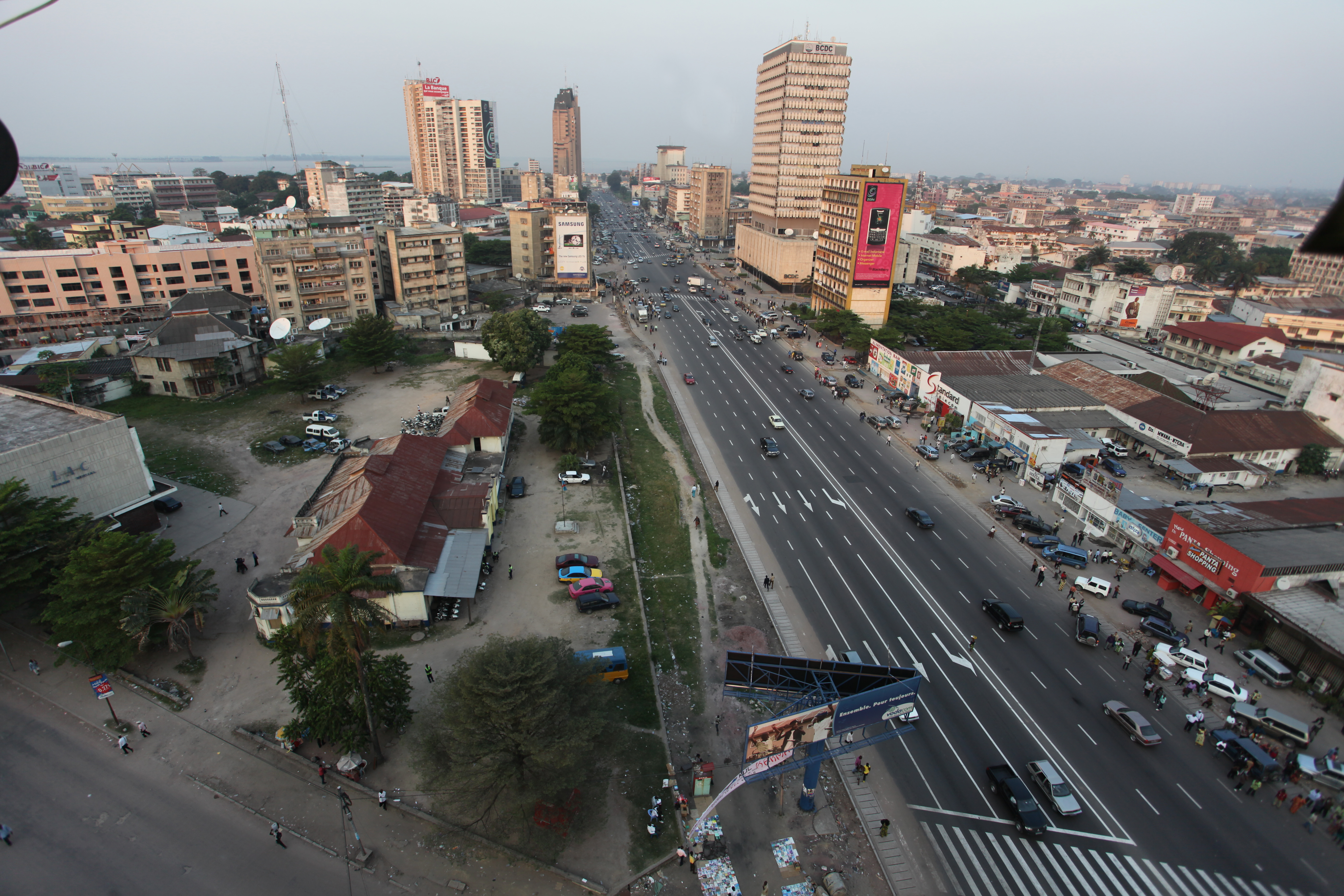
- The Boulevard du 30 Juin, downtown Kinshasa
- Interactive map of Boulevard du 30 Juin
- Former name: Boulevard Albert 1er
- Owner: City of Kinshasa
- Length: 5 km (3.1 mi)
- Location: Kinshasa, Democratic Republic of the Congo

Construction
- Construction start: 1912

The Boulevard du 30 Juin ("Boulevard of June 30th") is a major 5‑km street in Kinshasa, Democratic Republic of the Congo (DRC). It is the city center's main transport artery, connecting the southern area of La Gombe with Kintambo and the Ngaliema to the west.

== History ==
Kinshasa's urban history began with the Belgian Congo settlement of Léopoldville, founded by Henry Morton Stanley in 1881 in the Kintambo-Ngaliema area west of the present-day city center. A second settlement later developed a few kilometers upstream around Chief Ntsuvila's village of Nshasha, in the present-day Kinshasa and Gombe communes. The need to connect these two settlements eventually led to the establishment of the Matadi–Kinshasa Railway in 1898.

In 1912, District Commissioner Georges Moulaert proposed the consolidation of the administrative areas of the Léopoldville commune, Kalina (now Gombe), and Ndolo, which then resulted in the construction of a road linking Léopoldville and the Léopoldville commune. As the colony's commercial center, the Léopoldville commune grew rapidly and surpassed Léopoldville, leading to the relocation of the port to Kinshasa and accelerating the area's development. This development paved the way for the creation of a new boulevard following the reconstruction of the Matadi–Kinshasa Railway in 1923.

In 1939, the vision of a grand boulevard gained momentum, with a monument honoring King Albert I of Belgium unveiled on the new Place de la Gare (now Place de l'Indépendance). World War II temporarily altered these plans, but by 1942, the boulevard had extended to Avenue du Port (the intersection at the current Grand Poste). Following the war, key sections of the boulevard were paved, which supported the emergence of public transit for African workers.

In the early 1950s, urban planning efforts sought to give Léopoldville an imperial character, with the boulevard as a central feature. By 1953, the boulevard had extended five kilometers to Kalina and included notable buildings such as the Sabena offices, designed by Claude Laurens; the Royal residential-commercial building, constructed by FORESCOM contractor Henri Trenteseaux; and a Le Corbusier-inspired apartment complex for civil servants. After independence, the boulevard's development slowed, but it was symbolically renamed Boulevard du 30 Juin on 30 June 1963 to commemorate the Democratic Republic of Congo's independence from Belgium on 30 June 1960.

== Road network ==
Boulevard du 30 Juin connects Kintambo and Kinshasa commune. From Kintambo, the road passes through Ngaliema before continuing as Matadi Road (National Route 1) toward Kongo Central. From Kinshasa commune, Boulevard Lumumba extends east toward Kwango and central DR Congo via Nsele and Maluku. Two major roads connect these two outbound routes from the city. They are Pierre Mulele Avenue (formerly 24 Novembre Avenue), which links Boulevard du 30 Juin with Matadi Road in Ngaliema, and University Avenue, which runs from Limete through Mont-Amba, the University of Kinshasa, and Mont-Ngafula before meeting Matadi Road at the southern city limits. Together, these roads form an informal ring road.

== Rehabilitation ==
=== Road rehabilitation ===
In 2006, President Joseph Kabila Kabange inaugurated the commencement of rehabilitation and modernization work on Route Des Poids-Lourds, Limete 14eme Rue, Boulevard du 30 Juin, and Boulevard Lumumba. Kinshasa's governor, Kimbembe Mazunga, affirmed that Kinshasa's Town Hall settled all associated bills with its own funds. He emphasized that the Town Hall's financing covers costs related to sanitizing Boulevard du 30 juin and rehabilitating Route Des Poids-Lourds (from Pont Matete to Kinshasa Central Station), Boulevard Lumumba (from Limete Tower to Funa), and Boulevard Sendwe (from Avenue de la Funa to Kasa-Vubu Avenue). These projects were executed by the Compagnie Nationale Chinoise de Travaux de Ponts et Chaussées (CNCTPC). Parenthetically, the city's governor stated that Bokassa Avenue, where several issues have arisen, will undergo complete rehabilitation shortly, with the necessary means already available. By February 2011, Boulevard du 30 Juin and Boulevard Triomphal were fully rehabilitated and widened.

=== LED lighting rehabilitation ===
On 25 August 2020, Kinshasa's governor, Gentiny Ngobila Mbala, initiated rehabilitation work for public lighting on key Kinshasa arteries, including Boulevard du 30 Juin, Boulevard Lumumba, Avenue Colonel Mondjiba, Avenue de la Justice, and Avenue des Batetela. He projected a 14-day duration to replace conventional lights with energy-efficient LED lights. A total of 620 300-Watt LED bulbs were mounted on 320 metal poles along Boulevard du 30 Juin to Kintambo Magasin. Each pole housed two luminaires: one facing the road and the other the sidewalk. As of 16 December 2022, numerous streets throughout Kinshasa, even in economically disadvantaged urban areas, had been illuminated through rehabilitation efforts.

== Government and infrastructure ==
Numerous national government offices are conveniently situated or have significant business presences on Boulevard du 30 Juin:

- Ministry of Transport and Channels of Communication
- Independent National Electoral Commission
- Ministry of Employment
- Ministry of Finance
- Ministry of Health
- Ministry of Land Affairs
- Central Bank of the Congo
- Direction General of Migration
- Permanent Office of Investigations of Aviation Accidents and Incidents
- MONUSCO
- REGIDESO
- Kinshasa Central Station
- Kinshasa General Hospital
- Hôtel du Gouvernement
- Gécamines Building
- National Social Security Fund

== Gallery ==
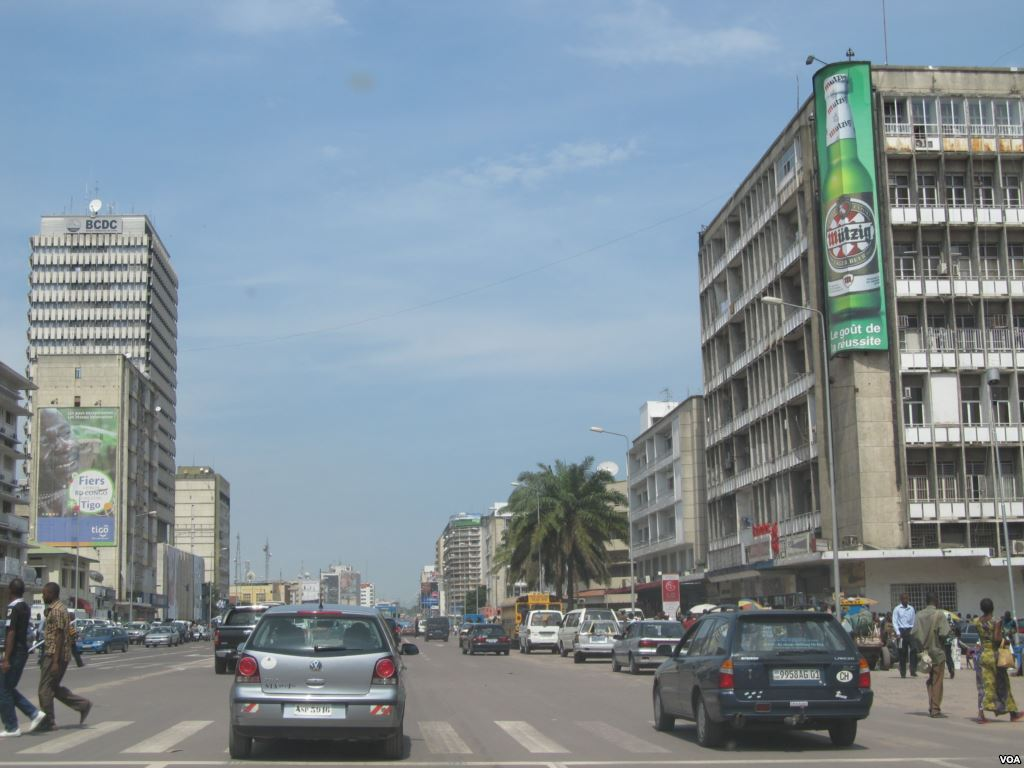
2013

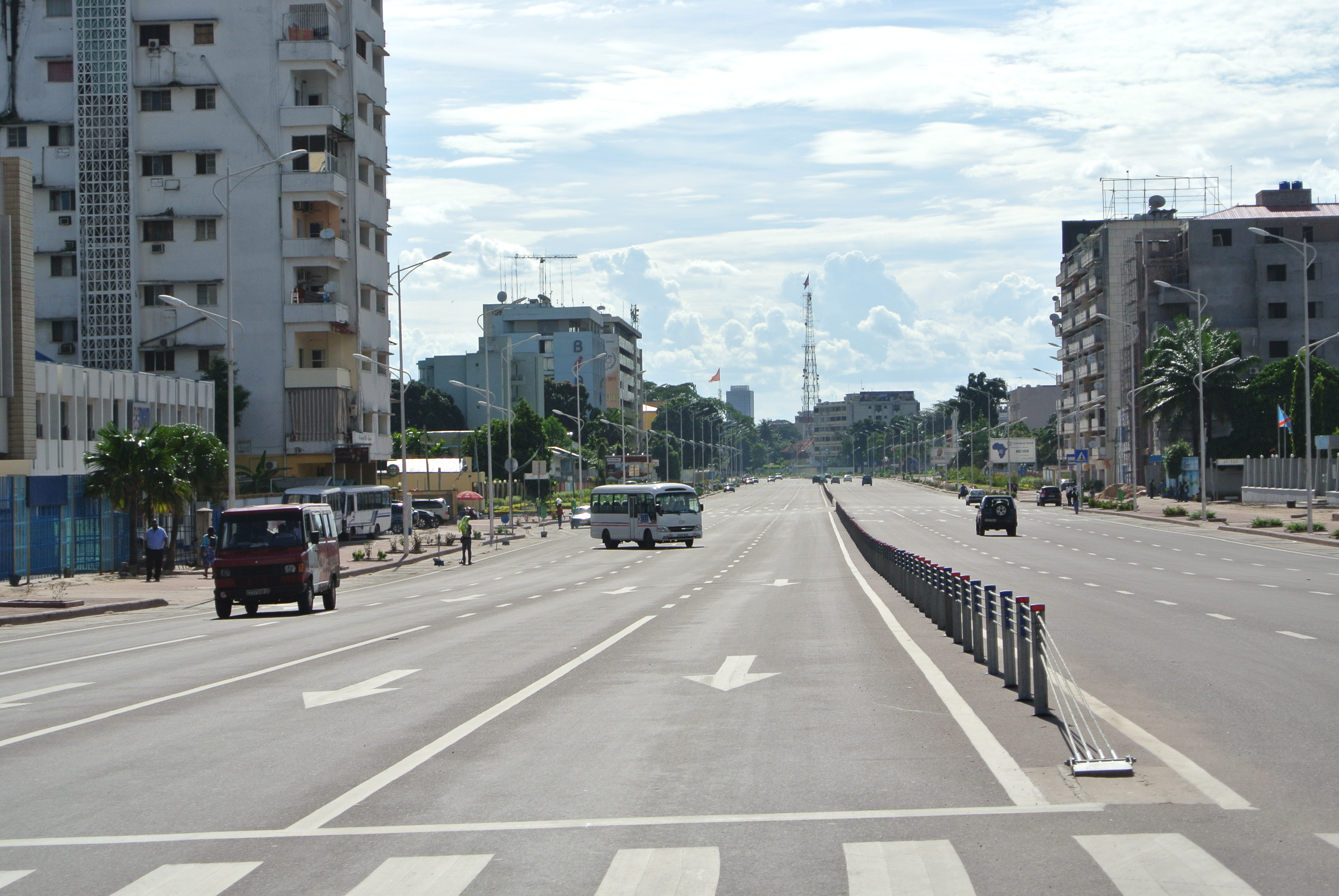

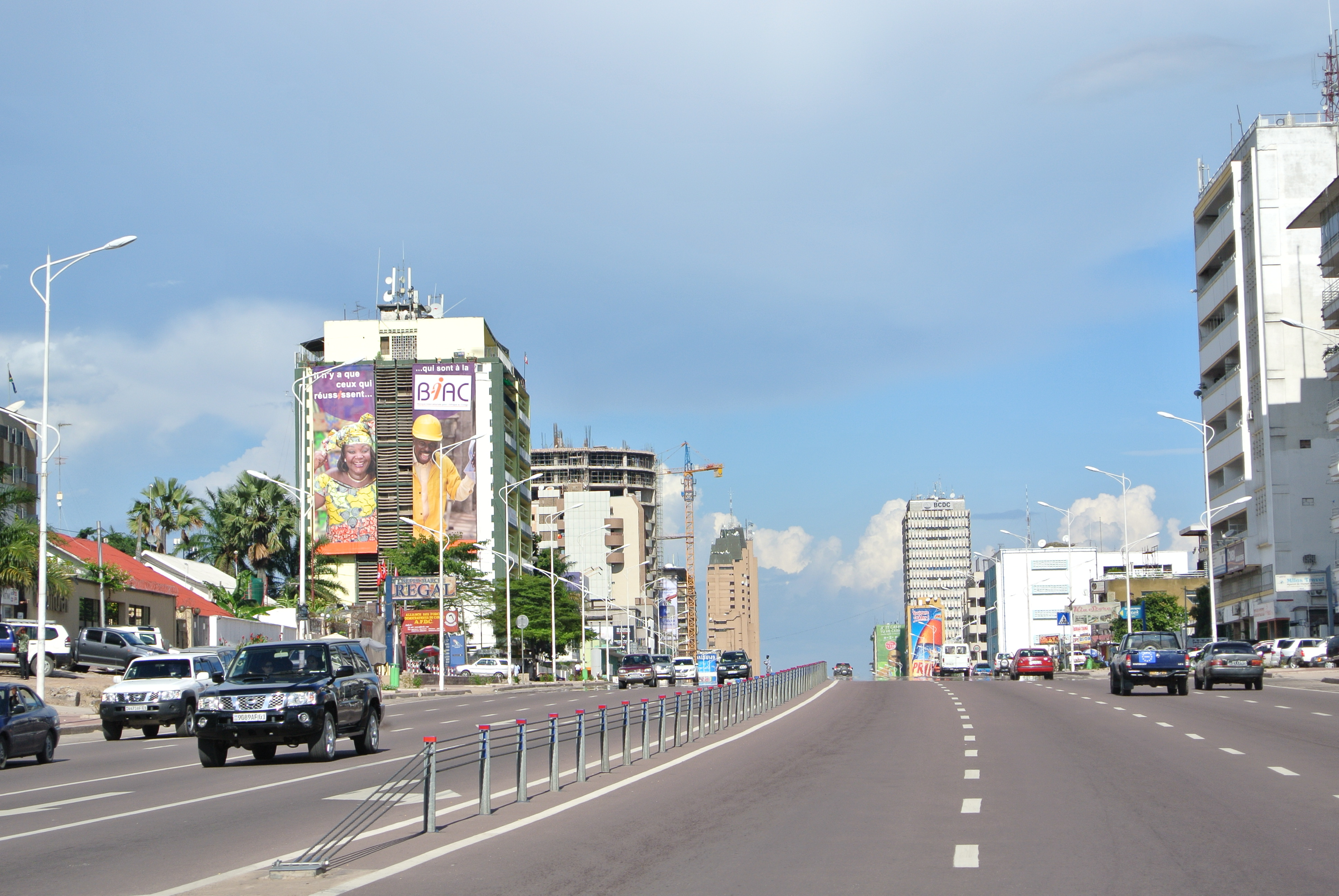

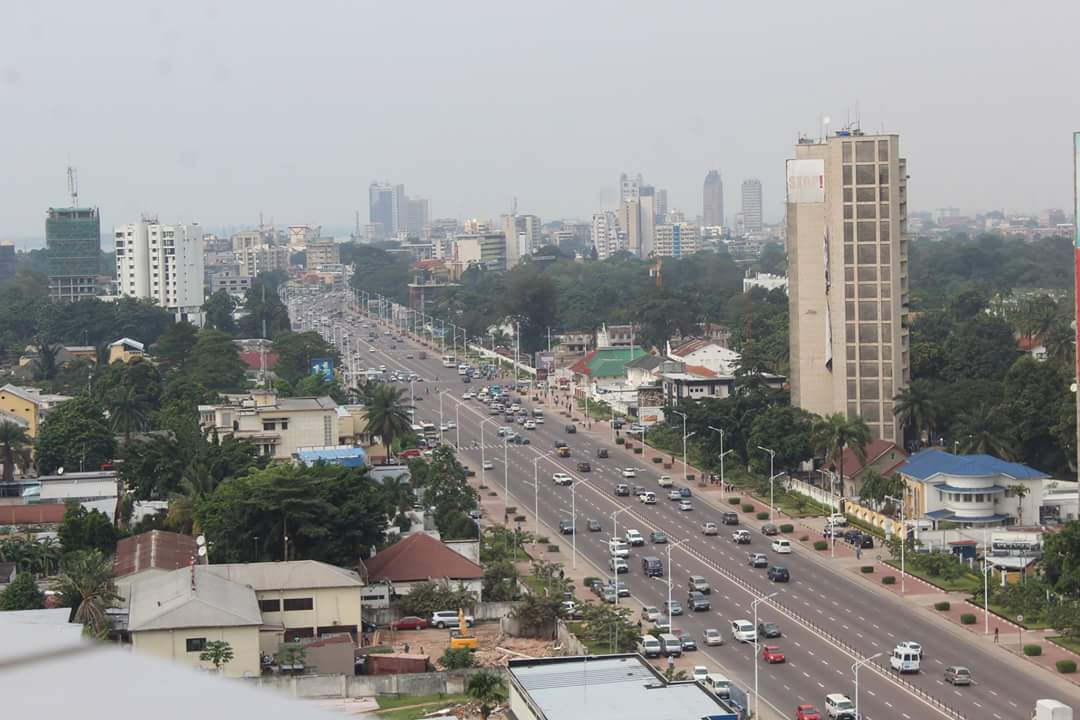

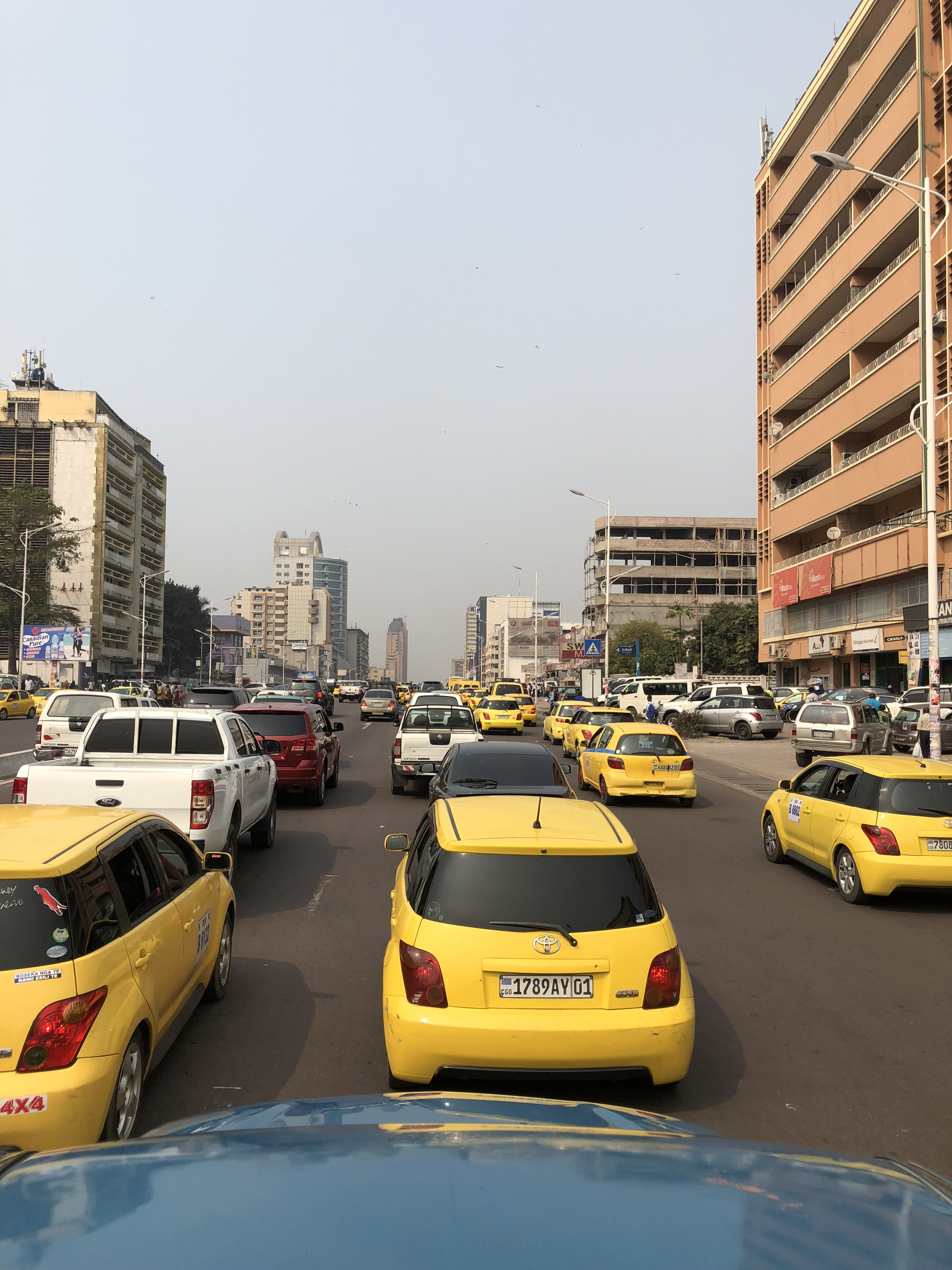

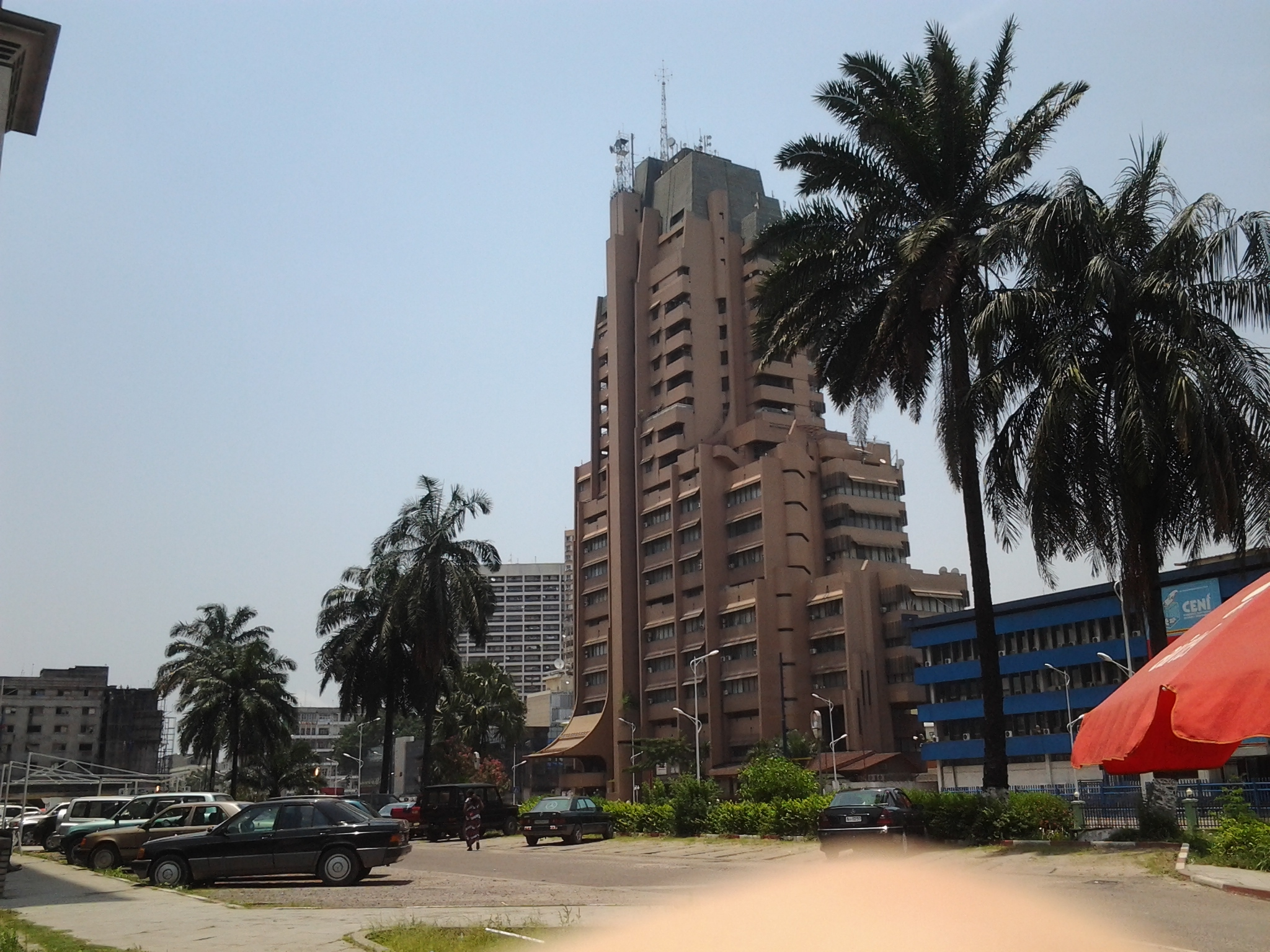

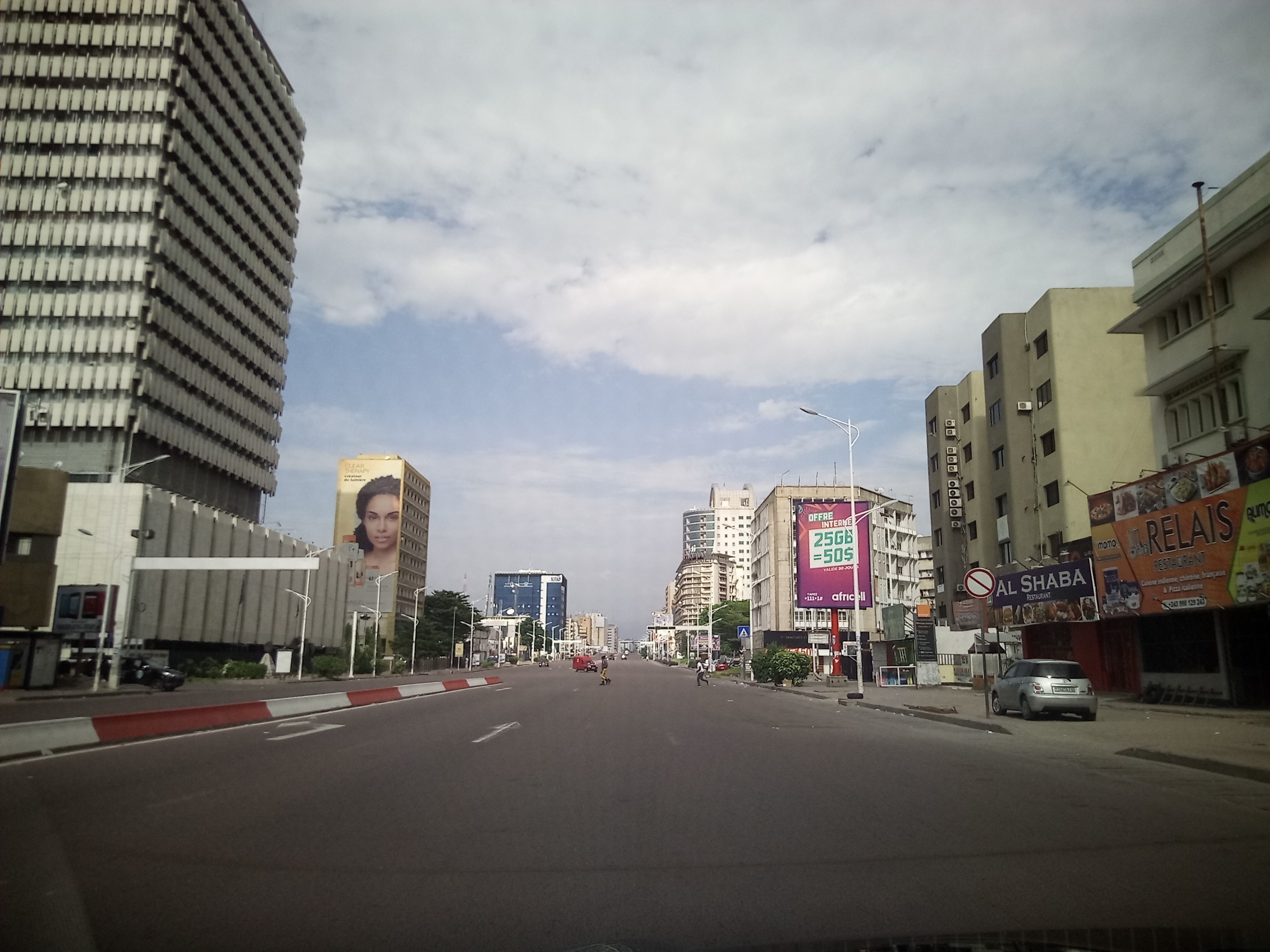

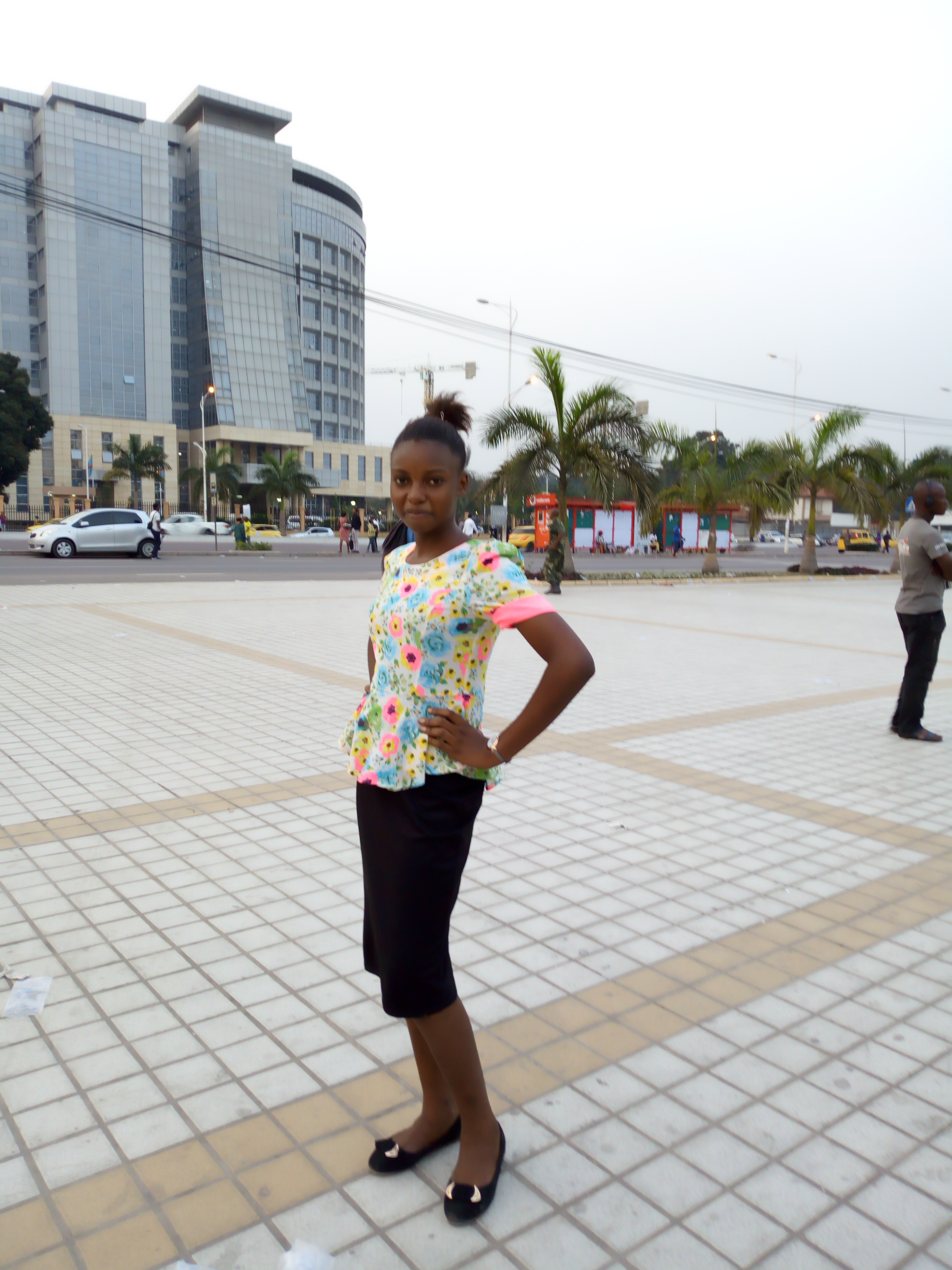

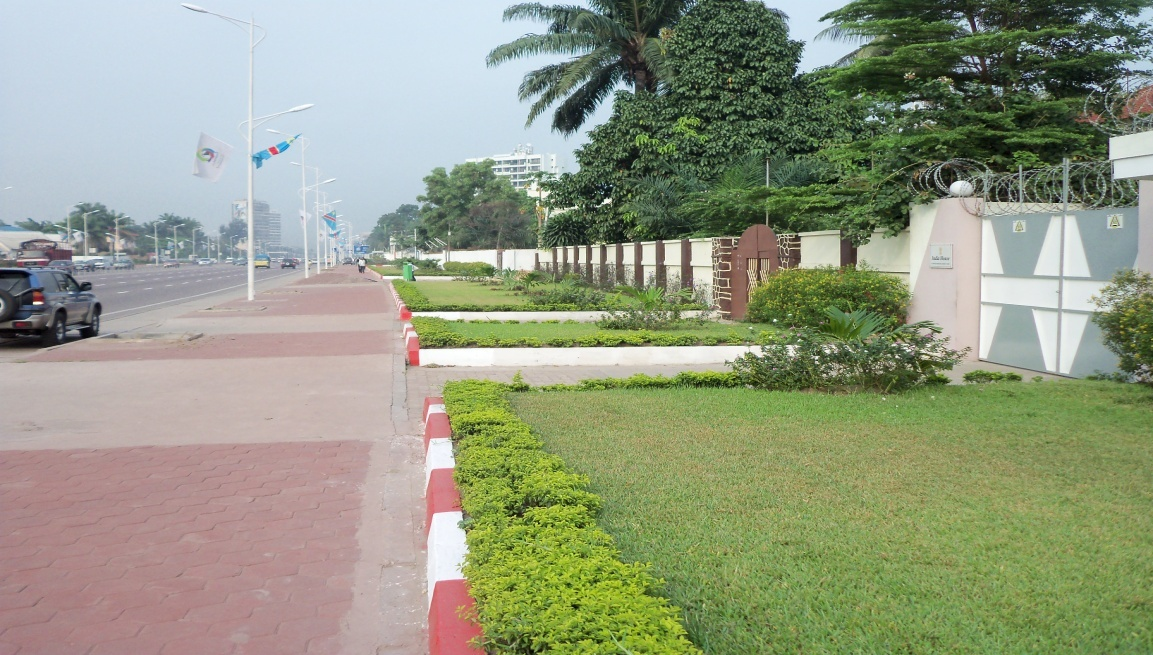

== See also ==
- Trans-African Highway network
