= List of railway stations in the Democratic Republic of the Congo =

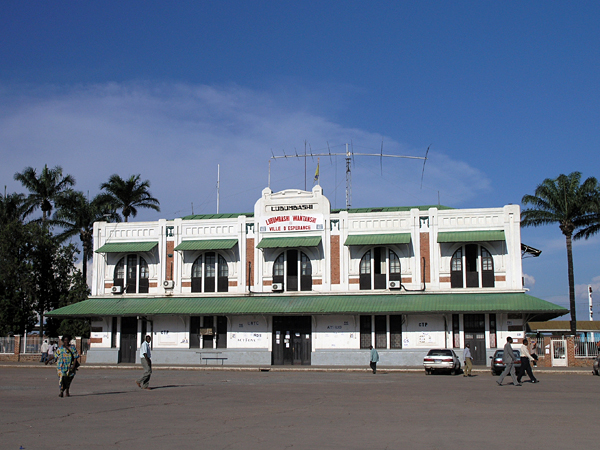
Central Railway Station, Lubumbashi

Railway stations in the Democratic Republic of Congo (DR Congo) include:

== Maps ==
- UN Map West
- UN Map East
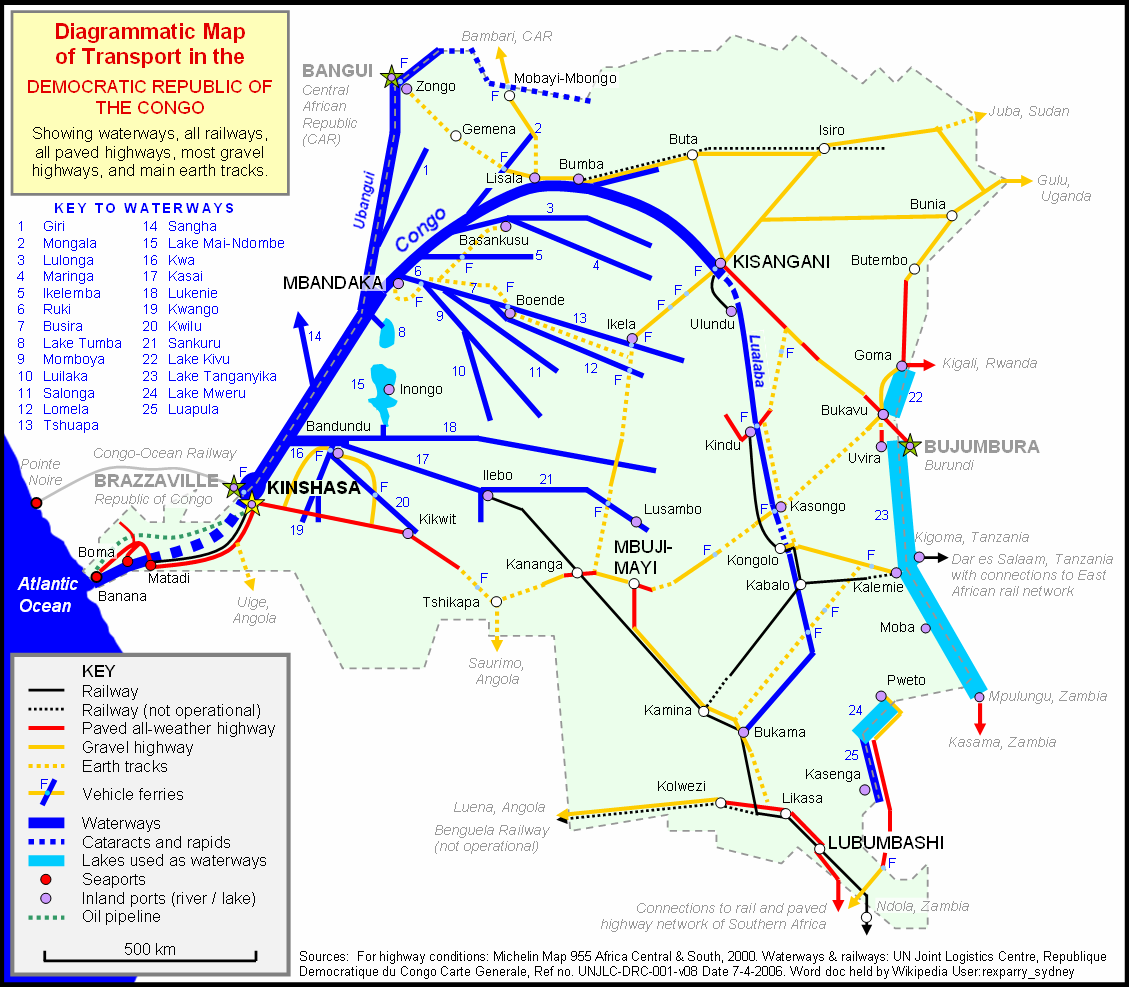

== Stations served by passenger trains ==
| Station name | Route(s) |
|---|---|
| Aketi | Aketi – Bumba; Aketi – Isiro |
| Andoma (Liénart) | Aketi – Isiro |
| Bangu | Kinshasa Est – Matadi |
| Bukama | Ilebo – Lubumbashi; Kabalo – Lubumbashi |
| Bumba | Aketi – Bumba |
| Demba | Ilebo – Lubumbashi |
| Dibaya | Ilebo – Lubumbashi |
| Dilolo | Dilolo – Lubumbashi |
| Dulia | Aketi – Isiro |
| Guba | Dilolo – Lubumbashi; Ilebo – Lubumbashi; Kabalo – Lubumbashi |
| Ilebo | Ilebo – Lubumbashi |
| Isiro | Aketi – Isiro |
| Kabalo | Kabalo – Kindu; Kabalo – Lubumbashi |
| Kabongo | Kabalo – Lubumbashi |
| Kaloko | Kabalo – Lubumbashi |
| Kamina | Ilebo – Lubumbashi; Kabalo – Lubumbashi |
| Kananga | Ilebo – Lubumbashi |
| Kaniama | Ilebo – Lubumbashi |
| Kasaji | Dilolo – Lubumbashi |
| Kasese | Kisangani Gare – Ubundu |
| Katutu | Kabalo – Lubumbashi |
| Kazangulu | Kinshasa Est – Matadi |
| Kibamba | Kabalo – Kindu |
| Kibombo | Kabalo – Kindu |
| Kilembo | Kinshasa Est – Matadi |
| Kilomètre 82 | Kisangani Gare – Ubundu |
| Kimiala | Kinshasa Est – Matadi |
| Kindu | Kabalo – Kindu |
| Kinshasa Est | Kinshasa Est – Matadi |
| Kisangani Gare | Kisangani Gare – Ubundu |
| Kisantu | Kinshasa Est – Matadi |
| Kolwezi | Dilolo – Lubumbashi |
| Komba | Aketi – Isiro |
| Kongolo | Kabalo – Kindu |
| Kuyi | Kinshasa Est – Matadi |
| Likasi | Dilolo – Lubumbashi; Ilebo – Lubumbashi; Kabalo – Lubumbashi |
| Likeri | Kabalo – Kindu |
| Lubudi | Ilebo – Lubumbashi; Kabalo – Lubumbashi |
| Lubumbashi | Dilolo – Lubumbashi; Ilebo – Lubumbashi; Kabalo – Lubumbashi; Lubumbashi – Sakania |
| Lufu | Kinshasa Est – Matadi |
| Luishia | Dilolo – Lubumbashi; Ilebo – Lubumbashi; Kabalo – Lubumbashi |
| Luputa | Ilebo – Lubumbashi |
| Madimba | Kinshasa Est – Matadi |
| Malanga | Kinshasa Est – Matadi |
| Malela | Kabalo – Kindu |
| Malonga | Dilolo – Lubumbashi |
| Matadi | Kinshasa Est – Matadi |
| Mokambo | Lubumbashi – Sakania |
| Mutshatsha | Dilolo – Lubumbashi |
| Mweka | Ilebo – Lubumbashi |
| Mwene Ditu | Ilebo – Lubumbashi |
| Ngwena | Kabalo – Lubumbashi |
| Nsongo | Kinshasa Est – Matadi |
| Sakania | Lubumbashi – Sakania |
| Samba | Kabalo – Kindu |
| Songololo | Kinshasa Est – Matadi |
| Tenke | Dilolo – Lubumbashi; Ilebo – Lubumbashi; Kabalo – Lubumbashi |
| Ubundu | Kisangani Gare – Ubundu |
| Zobia | Aketi – Isiro |
| Zofu | Kabalo – Lubumbashi |

== Stations served by rail ==
=== Existing ===
==== Matadi–Kinshasa Railway ====
- Ango-Ango
- Matadi
- Mpozo
- Kenge
- Songololo
- Mbanza-Ngungu
- Kimpese
- Lukala- cement works
- Kintoni
- Kwilu Ngongo
- Kisuntu
- Inkisi a.k.a. Kisantu
- Matete
- Madimba
- Kindamba
  - Dembo
- Kasangulu
- (start of suburban area)
- Mont Ngafula
- Kinsenso
- Matete
- Ndjili
- (Democratic Republic of the Congo) Limete - Kinshasa - national capital; (river port railhead)
- (Democratic Republic of the Congo) (Republic of the Congo) (proposed road-rail bridge on border.)
- (Republic of the Congo) Brazzaville

- Barumbu
- La Gombe
- Kitambo
- Ngaliema
- (local line to west)

- (local line to east)
- Limbe
- Masina
- Kinshasa Airport

==== Inland lines ====
- Ilebo - (river port railhead)
- Bakwa-Kasanga
- Mweka
- Demba
- Kananga (was Luluabourg)
- Kamwandu
- Kazumba
- Mwene Ditu
- Lusuku
- Kamina - junction to north
- Tenke - junction to Angola
- Likasi
- Lubumbashi
- (Democratic Republic of the Congo) Sakania
- (border)
- (Zambia) Ndola

- Tenke - junction
- Kakopa
- Mutshatsha
- Kasaji
  - (Democratic Republic of the Congo) Divuma
- (Angolan Border)
- (Angola) Luau

- Kamina - junction
- Kabongo
- Musono
- Kabalo - junction to east
- Kongolo - river bridge
- Kindu - (river port railhead)

- Kabalo - junction to east
- Kazumba
- Kalemie - inland port on Lake Tanganyika

- Benaleka - major accident

=== Vicicongo line ===
600 mm (1 ft 11 5/8 in)

- Bumba (Congo river port)
- Aketi
- Buta
- Likati
- Isiro
- Mungbere - terminus
  - Bondo - branch
  - Titule - branch

=== Portage ===
1000mm gauge portage railway bypassing Stanley Falls

- Kisangani (Congo River port)
- Ubundu (upper Congo River port)

=== Proposed ===
- Kinshasa - national capital; (river port railhead)
- (river ferry to be replaced by 1015 km long railway)
- Ilebo - (river port railhead)

- (Republic of the Congo) (Democratic Republic of the Congo) Brazzaville-Kinshasa Bridge

=== Closed ===
==== Mayumbe Railways (CFVM) ====
610 mm (2 ft)

- Boma - port
- Tshela - terminus

==== Kivu Railways (CEFAKI) ====
1,067 mm (3 ft 6 in)

- Uvira - port
- Kamanyola - connection to coach service to Bukavu (rail never finished; part of the Cape to Cairo Railway)

== Tunnels ==
- Lubumbashi
- Matadi (270 m)

== See also ==
- Rail transport in DRC
- Transport in DRC
- Railway stations in Angola
- Railway stations in Congo
- Matadi-Kinshasa Railway
