= Fiafed =

FIAFED (French: Filles d'aujourd'hui, Femmes de demain; "Girls of today, women of tomorrow"), founded June 16, 2000 by Irène Maloba Kayembe, is a non-governmental organization based in the Democratic Republic of the Congo. The organisation's goals consist of bringing free education, affordable health care and job training to thousands of families living in several remote villages in the Democratic Republic of the Congo.

== Existing Projects ==
FIAFED built a primary school, C.S. Les Huit Colombes, in the remote village of Bungu Bungu in Katanga. Prior to building the school in this village of 5,000, 80% of the children did not attend school. This new school had a deep impact on the whole population because it represented a hope for a better future for the families. Since opening in 2005,C.S. Les Huit Colombes has had approximately 2,500 children attending. For the 2008-2009 session, the school had an impressive record of 630 students. The 2009-2010 and 2010-2011 school years had a big drop in enrollments because of the global economic crisis as more than 300 students decided to quit school to work in plantations to help their laid-off parents. Even though tuition was free, the students simply could not afford to not be working.

A health center was also built in Bungu Bungu with the considerable help from Katanga's current governor, Mr. Moise Katumbi. Thousand of lives have been improved have improved through the public health programs initiated by Irène Maloba Kayembe. Le Centre de Santé Moise Katumbi Chapwe was created to help the local villagers gain easy access to affordable health care. This center is equipped with ten beds, one pharmacy, one lab, two bathrooms and two showers. The staff is composed of one doctor, one pharmacist, two nurses and a housekeeper.

In 2009, FIAFED completed the construction of its maternity unit, La Maternité Robert Levi in Bungu Bungu. This is a groundbreaking event for this community, especially for the women, who need never again give birth inside huts or under a tree. Now these strong mothers will take advantage of a great maternity center as do other women around the Katanga province.

In 2010, FIAFED opened its second primary school in the province of Katanga: E.P. Princèsse Onda Onda Numbi. Several prominent business leaders contributed to FIAFED's efforts including Governor Moise Katumbi of Katanga who donated 100 brand new desks made exclusively for the school and Albert Yuma President of the Chamber of Commerce and Executive Director at TEXAF who donated 100 new school uniforms to the organization. This is the first modern school ever built in the village of Djino.

== Training Disadvantaged Women ==
Job training is an important activity inside FIAFED. With the help of experienced FIAFED and IMEXIN staff members, teen mothers, single mothers, widows and other disadvantaged women have enrolled in this free six-month program to get intensive training on computer applications, empowering them to become financially independent. Under the leadership of Irène Maloba Kayembe, FIAFED also offers a free cutting and sewing program to women in Kinshasa, the capital city, in its headquarters in Kintambo teaching how to cut, assemble, and finish all kinds of clothing. In addition to providing women with new skills, this successful program is designed to leave them a margin of creativity crucial to a good self-image and confidence.
