= Kilembe =

Kilembe, may refer to

- Kilembe, DR Congo, a community in Kwilu District, Bandundu Province, Democratic Republic of the Congo (DRC).
- Kilembe, Uganda, a community in Kasese District, Western Region, Uganda.
