= Benaleka train accident =

2007 train derailment in the Democratic Republic of the Congo

Coordinates: 5°07′41″S 22°10′18″E

Details
- Date: August 1, 2007; 23:00
- Location: Benaleka
- Country: Democratic Republic of Congo
- Line: Ilebo to Kananga
- Operator: Congo Railroad Company
- Incident type: Runaway derailment
- Cause: Brake failure

Statistics
- Trains: 1
- Deaths: 100
- Injured: 128

The Benaleka train accident occurred on August 1, 2007 near Benaleka in the Democratic Republic of Congo, killing at least 100 people and seriously injuring 128 more.

The train crashed in a remote location 220 kilometres (140 mi) northwest of Kananga in West Kasai province at 11 p.m. local time. The crash was caused by the failure of the train's brakes. Eight cars derailed; many of those killed had been riding on the roofs and were trapped underneath. The driver was able to detach the locomotive and go for help. Many of the injured were carried by bicycle or even on the backs of others to the nearest hospital, six miles away.

It is one of the deadliest rail incidents on the African continent.
