= Kindamba, Democratic Republic of the Congo =

Coordinates: 04°45′01″S 15°08′22″E

Kindamba is a town in the Bas-Congo province of the Democratic Republic of the Congo, situated to the southwest of the capital, Kinshasa.

== Transport ==
It is served by a station on the Matadi-Kinshasa Railway.

== See also ==
- Railway stations in DRCongo
