= Kasanga (disambiguation) =

Kasanga may refer to:

== Language ==
- Kasanga language (cassanga), Haal, or Gu-haaca, a Senegambian language traditionally spoken in a few villages of Guinea-Bissau

== Place names ==
- Kasanga, a town in Rukwa Region, on the shore of Lake Tanganyika, Tanzania

== Patronyme ==
- Jackson Kasanga Mulwa (1942–2015), Kenyan judge and politician

== See also ==
- Bakwa-Kasanga
