= USRA =

USRA may refer to:

- Undergraduate Student Research Award of the Natural Sciences and Engineering Research Council (NSERC USRA), a prestigious research award for top Canadian undergraduate researchers
- União dos Sindicatos Revolucionarios de Angola (Union of Revolutionary Trade Unions of Angola)
- United Slot Racers Association, a slot racing organizations
- United States Racquetball Association, former name of USA Racquetball
- United States Railroad Administration (1917–1920), the nationalized rail system during World War I
  - USRA standard locomotives built by this administration
- United States Railway Association (1974–1987), the corporation that oversaw the creation of Conrail
- Universities Space Research Association, a Washington, D.C.–based nonprofit corporation under the auspices of the National Academy of Sciences
