= Kintoni =

Town in the Democratic Republic of the Congo

Coordinates: 04°43′50″S 15°04′35″E

Kintoni is a town in the Bas-Congo province of the Democratic Republic of the Congo.

== Transport ==
It is served by a station on the Matadi-Kinshasa Railway.

== See also ==
- Railway stations in DRCongo
