= Gare de l'Est, Kinshasa =

Railway station in Kinshasa, Congo

Gare de l'Est
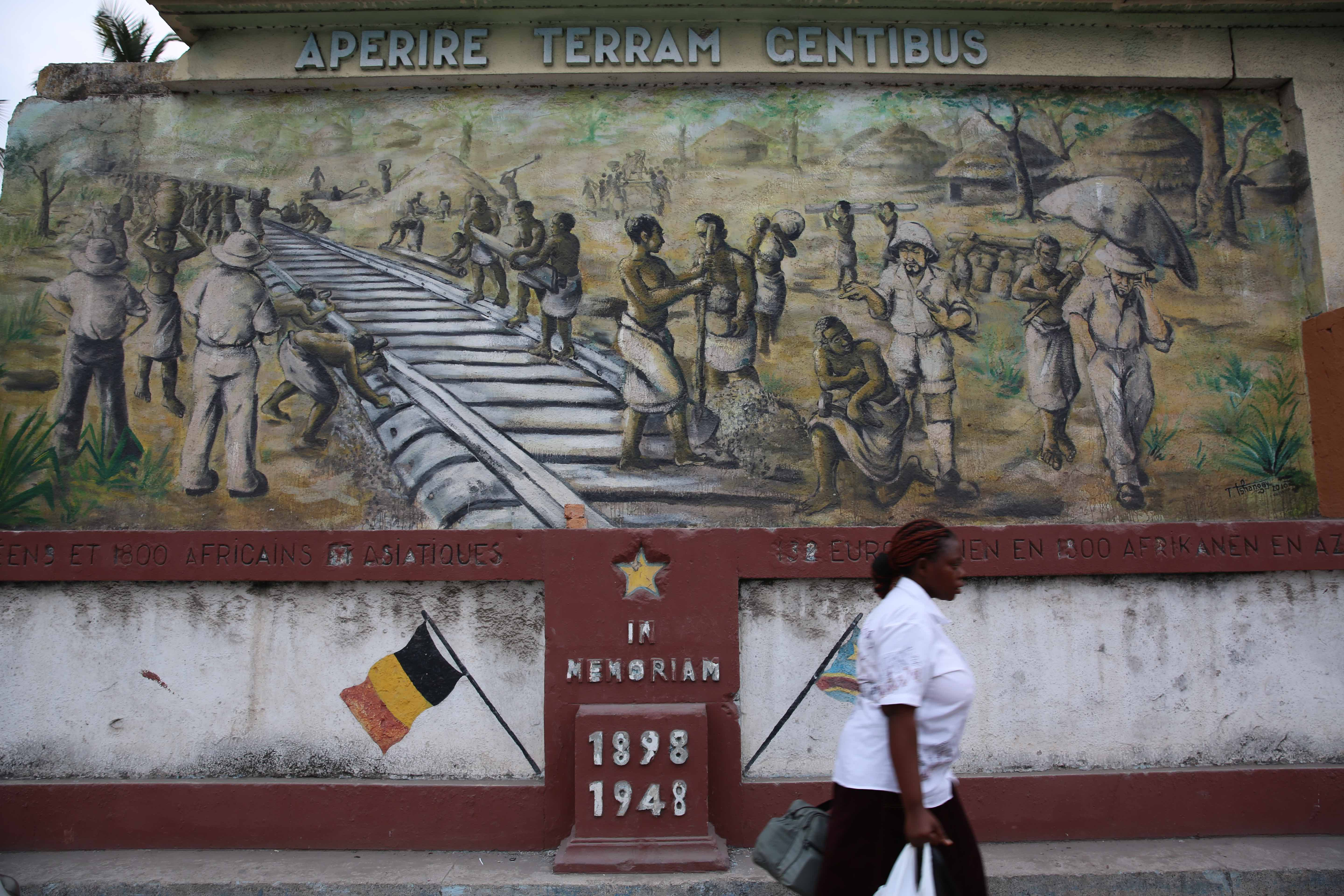
- A memorial at the station remembering those who died during the construction of the railroad

General information
- Location: Boulevard du 30 Juin, Gombe, Kinshasa; Democratic Republic of the Congo
- System: Terminus
- Owner: SCTP
- Line: Matadi-Kinshasa Railway

History
- Opened: 1932
- Former names: Léopoldville Est
Location

The Gare de l'Est, also known as Kinshasa Est or Kinshasa Central Station (French: Gare centrale de Kinshasa), is a central railway station situated in the Gombe commune of Kinshasa, Democratic Republic of the Congo. Positioned along the Matadi–Kinshasa Railway line, it functions as a pivotal transshipment point connecting the railway and the river. Managed by the Société Commerciale des Transports et des Ports (SCTP), the station stands near Ngobila Beach at the Port of Kinshasa, fostering maritime links with Brazzaville, and is conveniently located close to SCTP buildings and the Ministry of Transport and Channels of Communication.

The Matadi-Kinshasa Railway line traverses through the city, tracing the path of the Ndjili River and, further upstream, the Lukaya River. This route circumvents the historic city from its eastern and southern flanks, ultimately reaching Kinshasa's central station. A deserted former track extends beyond Ngaliema Bay. Additionally, a route leads southeast from the central station to the Ndjili International Airport.

== History ==
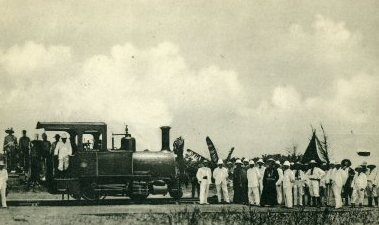
The arrival of the first locomotive in Léopoldville (now Kinshasa), Congo Free State, ca. 1898

Prior to the inauguration of the Congo-Ocean Railway, which links Pointe-Noire with Brazzaville, the primary station serving Léopoldville (now Kinshasa) and Brazzaville was Kintambo (baptized Kintambo Magasin). Following the gauge conversion from 750 mm to 1,067 mm on the Matadi-Kinshasa Railway (Chemin de Fer Matadi-Kinshasa; CFMK) and the relocation of the tracks between Ndolo and Kintambo from the middle of Boulevard Albert 1er (now Boulevard Du 30 Juin) to their current position in 1932, a new station was erected at Pool Malebo: "Léopoldville Est." The former Kintambo station was redesignated as "Léopoldville Ouest." Following the nation's independence from Belgium and the city's renaming to Kinshasa during Mobutu Sese Seko's Authenticité campaign, "Léopoldville Est" was rechristened as Kinshasa Est or Gare de Kinshasa.

== Rehabilitation ==
=== 2015 ===
In October 2015, the Société Commerciale des Transports et des Ports (SCTP) rehabilitated the Matadi–Kinshasa Railway line with a budget of $10.7 million released by the former prime minister Matata Ponyo Mapon. The project aimed to rehabilitate the speed, safety, and comfort of the railroad track. The director of SCTP, Jean Kimbembe Mazunga, mentioned that the former state of the track posed a risk to public safety and caused significant material damage. Many stations, including Kinshasa Central Station, Matete Train Station, and Kimwenza Central Station, were rehabilitated, and the average speed was improved to 55 km/h, reducing the average travel time between Matadi and Kinshasa to 6.5 hours.

=== 2021–2022 ===
On September 14, 2021, the Ministry of Transport and Channels of Communication, Chérubin Okende Senga, announced the rehabilitation of the Matadi–Kinshasa Railway line between Kinshasa and Matadi after visiting the Kimwenza Central Station line. On April 18, 2022, he later announced the rehabilitation of the Matadi–Kinshasa Railway line from the Kinshasa Central Station to N'Djili International Airport, which would be built by a delegation of experts from the Japanese International Cooperation Agency (JICA). The Resident Representative of JICA in the DRC, Kazunao Shibata, led the delegation and indicated that the pre-feasibility study mission aims to strengthen the Kinshasa Railway.

== See also ==
- Matadi–Kinshasa Railway
- Congo-Ocean Railway
- Société Commerciale des Transports et des Ports
- Ministry of Transport and Channels of Communication
- Jean Kimbembe Mazunga
- Chérubin Okende Senga
