= Kenge, Kongo Central =

Town in the Democratic Republic of the Congo

Kenge is a town in the Kongo Central province in the Democratic Republic of the Congo located in Songololo Territory, in the western part of the province. The town is situated at an elevation of approximately 241 metres and is recorded as a populated place in geographic databases. OpenStreetMap and geographic gazetteers place Kenge at approximately 5°46′S 13°39′E.

== Transportation ==
Kenge is served by a station on the national railway system.

== See also ==
- Railway stations in DRCongo
