= Kasangulu =

- Interactive map of Kasangulu
- Location in Democratic Republic of the Congo
- Coordinates: 4°35′28″S 15°10′13″E
- Country: Democratic Republic of the Congo
- Province: Kongo Central

Kasangulu is a town and territory in the Kongo Central province of the Democratic Republic of the Congo. The town had an estimated population of 32,035 as of 2018.

== History ==
On 10 August 1998, during Operation Kitona in the Second Congo War, Kasangulu was the site of a battle, and DRC state radio claimed that 18 Rwandan soldiers were killed by Congolese troops.

== Transport ==
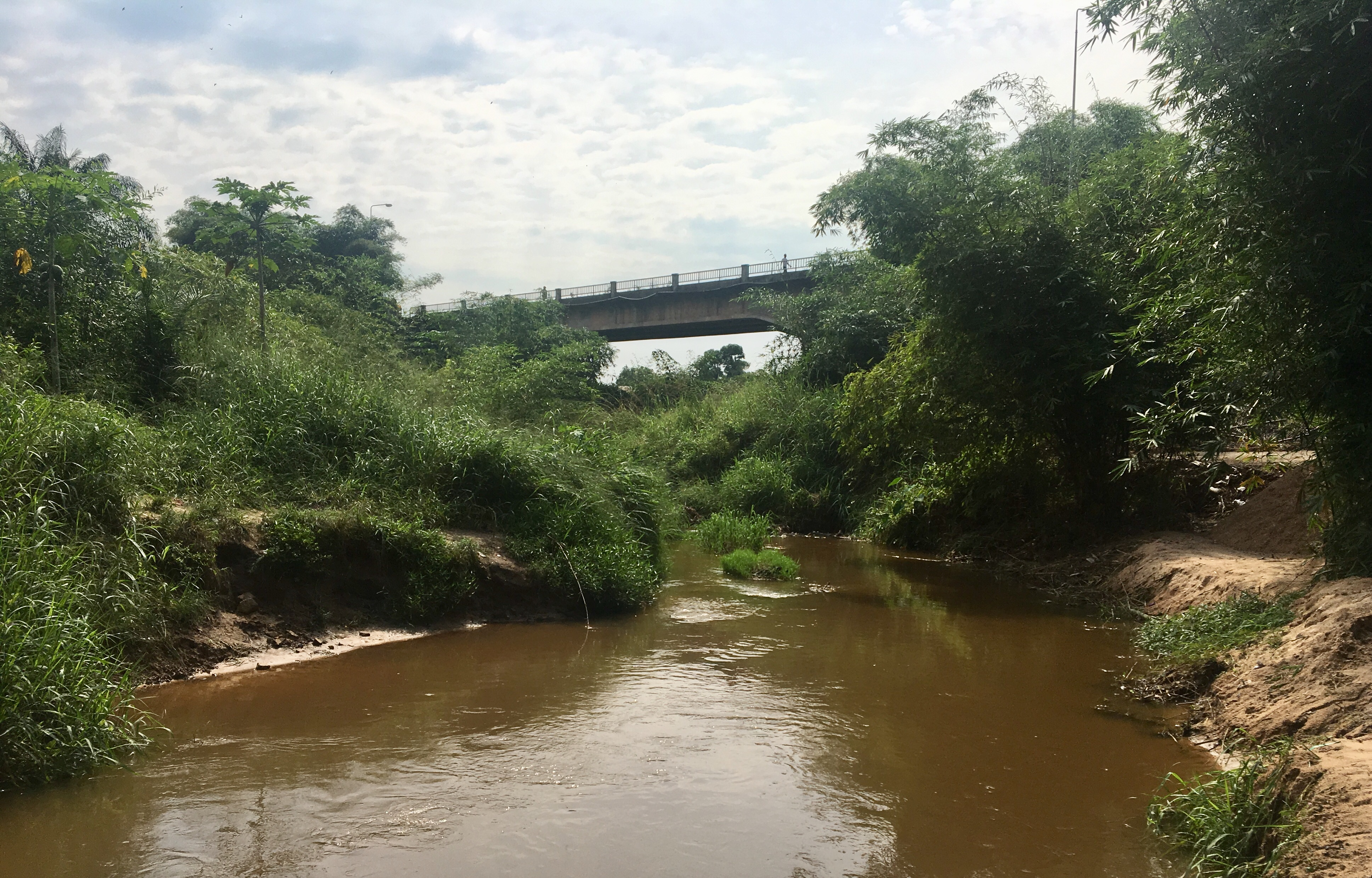
The Lukaya bridge, allowing National Road 1 to cross the Lukaya River in Kasangulu.

Kasangulu is located along transportation routes between Kinshasa and the Atlantic seaport of Matadi. The town is on National Road 1, the highway that connects Kongo Central to Kinshasa. It is also served by a train station on the Matadi–Kinshasa Railway, which has daily passenger service between Kasangulu and Kinshasa.

== See also ==
- Railway stations in DR Congo
