= National Social Security Fund (Democratic Republic of the Congo) =

Public social security institution in the DR Congo

- Caisse nationale de sécurité sociale (French)
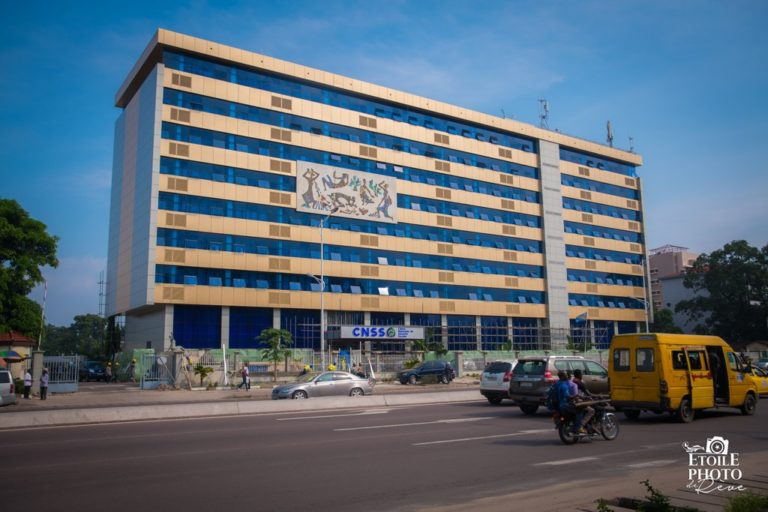
- The CNSS headquarters in Gombe, Kinshasa

Public social security institution overview
- Formed: 14 July 2018
- Preceding public social security institution: Institut National de Sécurité Sociale (INSS)
- Jurisdiction: Government of the Democratic Republic of the Congo
- Headquarters: Boulevard du 30 Juin, Gombe, Kinshasa, Democratic Republic of the Congo
- Employees: More than 307,000 active insured workers
- Annual budget: ▲US$314 million (2021); US$204 million (previous period)
- Public social security institution executives: Charles Mudiay Kazadi, Director general; Didier Kipopa Omeonga, Deputy director general; Paul Babangu Wababu, Chairman of the board of directors
- Parent department: Ministry of Public Health, Hygiene and Social Welfare
- Website: cnss.cd

The National Social Security Fund (French: Caisse nationale de sécurité sociale, abbreviated CNSS) is a public institution that manages the general social security system in the Democratic Republic of the Congo. Its headquarters are located on Boulevard du 30 Juin in Gombe, Kinshasa. The CNSS was created by Decree No. 18/027 on 14 July 2018, and it succeeded the National Social Security Institute (Institut national de sécurité sociale; INSS), which had been in charge of social security since 1961.

The main role of the CNSS is to provide social security benefits to eligible workers and their dependents in three main areas: occupational risks, family benefits, and pensions. The CNSS also collects contributions, pays benefits, manages pension claims, and helps prevent accidents and diseases in the workplace.

The institution was created following the introduction of Law No. 16-009 on 15 July 2016, which brought changes to the country's social security system. These changes increased the number of people covered, added new family benefits, made family allowances available across the country, and revised provisions for retirement, disability, and benefits for surviving family members.

== History ==
=== Background and establishment of the INSS ===
Before a single national social security institution was created, social protection in the Democratic Republic of the Congo was managed through different systems for different groups of workers. During the colonial period, workers were covered by separate arrangements, and the benefits they received depended on their jobs and the risks covered by each system. After independence, the Congolese government began working toward bringing these systems together. This led to the Decree-Law of 29 June 1961, which created the National Social Security Institute (Institut national de sécurité sociale; INSS) to manage the country's general social security scheme.

The INSS was in charge of registering employers and workers, collecting contributions, and providing benefits to eligible members. The system introduced in 1961 aimed to end racial discrimination in social security, keep the system financially stable, and make its administration easier. It also used a pay-as-you-go financing system, where money collected from currently employed workers was used to pay benefits to pensioners and other eligible people. The system covered three main areas. The first was occupational risks, which included accidents and diseases caused by work. The second was pensions, which covered retirement, disability, and support for surviving family members. The third was family allowances, which helped families with dependent children.

=== Reform of the general social security scheme and establishment of the CNSS ===
The reform that led to the creation of the CNSS was coordinated by the Public Enterprise Reform Steering Committee (Comité de pilotage de la réforme des entreprises publiques, COPIREP). The main law behind the reform was Law No. 16-009, adopted on 15 July 2016, which introduced updated rules for the general social security system. The law became effective on 15 July 2018. With 134 articles arranged into ten chapters, the law changed the groups of people covered, the benefits they could receive, and the requirements for qualifying for those benefits. It also aimed to extend coverage to all parts of the country, add prenatal and maternity benefits, and revise pension rules. It also widened the range of workers and other people who could benefit from the system.

The change from the INSS to the CNSS was officially established by Decree No. 18/027 of 14 July 2018, which set out the creation, organization, and operation of the National Social Security Fund. The decree established the CNSS as a public institution focused on technical and social matters. It also gave the institution legal status and the freedom to manage its own affairs, while keeping it under state supervision. The CNSS then took over the INSS' role in managing the general social security system. This transfer included the former institution's property, rights, claims, debts, contracts, existing commitments, and agreements.

== Organization ==
=== Board of directors ===
The board of directors is in charge of guiding the institution, setting its policies, supervising its work, and making major decisions. It sets the institution's general policies, decides on its work plans, approves its budget, and reviews its yearly financial statements. It also approves the staff structure and personnel rules through a resolution, based on a proposal from the general management. These are then sent to the Minister of Public Health, Hygiene and Social Welfare for approval.

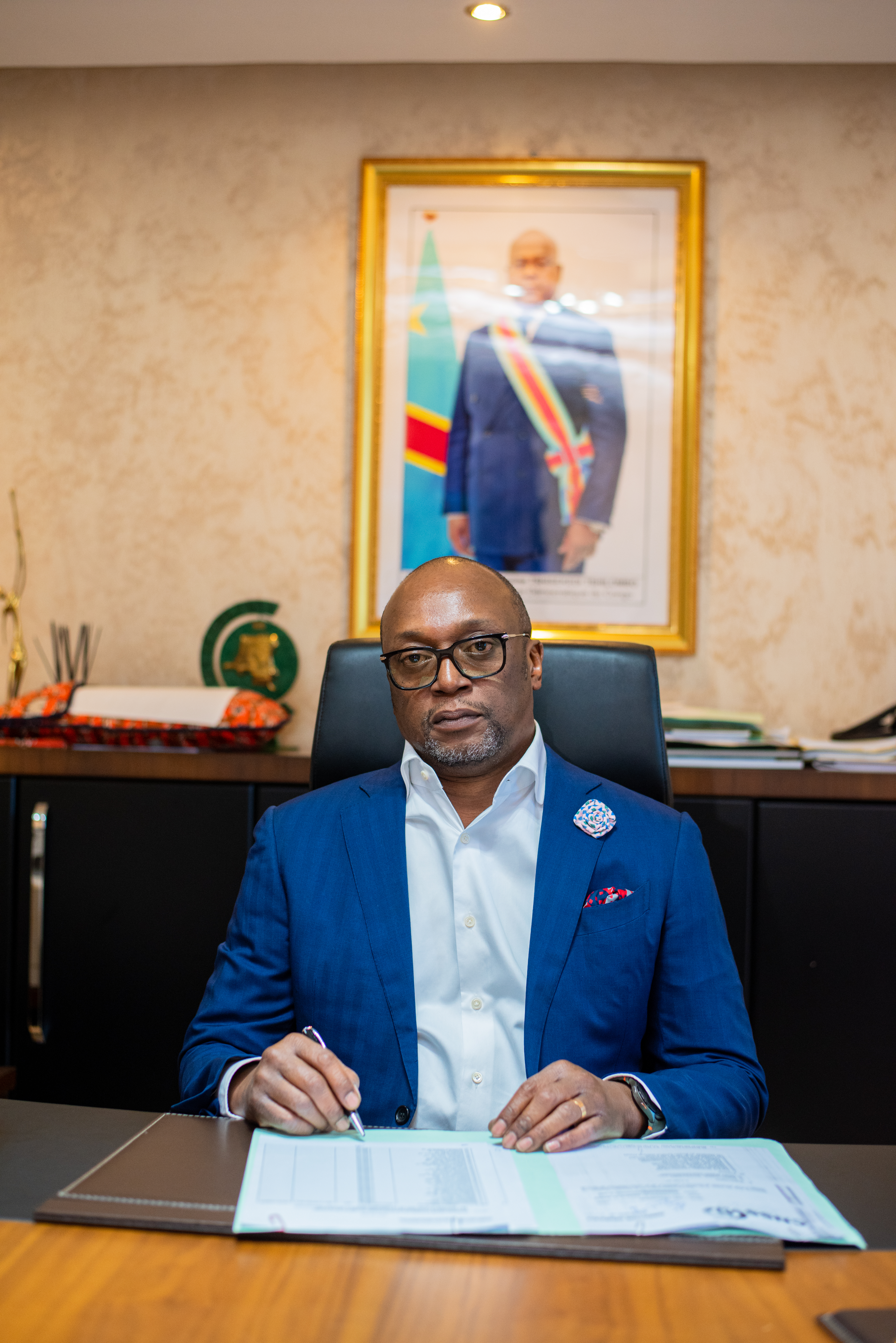
Charles Mudiay Kazadi has served as the director general of the CNSS since 2022.

The board consists of two state representatives, one representative from employers' professional organizations, and one representative from workers' professional organizations. One of the two state representatives is selected as director general through an agreement among the three groups. The president of the republic then officially appoints this person by ordinance. The appointment, removal, and possible dismissal of board members are also carried out by ordinance of the president of the republic, following consultation with the Council of Ministers. Members serve for three years and may be reappointed for one additional term. Their membership may end if they resign, die, or no longer meet the requirements for the position. In such cases, another person is appointed to replace them.

As for the chairperson, the board members elect one of their own for a one-year term, excluding the director general from this role. The position rotates among the eligible members. The board also holds ordinary meetings every three months, and the chairperson is responsible for calling these meetings.

Charles Mudiay Kazadi has served as director general since 30 December 2022, while Didier Kipopa Omeonga is the deputy director general. Paul Babangu Wababu became chairman of the board of directors on 10 February 2025.

=== General management ===
General management is the executive and administrative body, whose main role is to carry out the decisions made by the board of directors and manage the institution's daily activities. Its responsibilities include putting the board's decisions into action, managing the approved budget, preparing financial reports, and supervising and coordinating all departments and services. It also represents the CNSS when dealing with outside parties and takes the necessary steps to ensure that the institution runs properly.

General management is led by a director general, who is assisted by a deputy director general. The director general is selected from the two state representatives serving on the board of directors, based on an agreement reached by the social partners. This agreement must be recorded in official minutes. Afterward, the appointment is made official by an order of the president of the republic, following a government proposal that has been discussed by the Council of Ministers. The director general may also be dismissed through the same official process.

The deputy director general is also appointed by an order of the president of the republic. If the director general is absent or unable to work, the deputy director general takes the interim responsibilities. However, if the deputy is also unavailable, the Minister of Public Health, Hygiene and Social Welfare appoints an acting director after receiving a proposal from the board of directors. In legal matters, the director general handles cases involving the CNSS, whether the institution is making a claim or defending itself. If the director general cannot do so, these duties are carried out by the deputy director general or another officially authorized person.

=== The board of statutory auditors ===
The board of statutory auditors monitors the financial operations and makes sure they are properly managed. It has two members chosen from different professional bodies, and both must have the necessary technical skills and experience in social security. Their appointments are made through a decree of the Prime Minister after the Council of Ministers has discussed the matter and the Minister of Public Health, Hygiene and Social Welfare has made a proposal.

The members hold office for five years, with no possibility of renewal. However, they may be dismissed if they engage in misconduct while carrying out their work. They must also perform their duties together rather than make decisions separately.

=== Services ===
CNSS' administrative services
One secretariat for the statutory bodies
One secretariat for the director general
One coordination office for management centers
Eleven central directorates
Thirteen provincial directorates
Five urban directorates
Eighteen district offices
Sixteen branch offices
Nineteen contribution collection centers

== Benefits ==
=== Occupational risks ===
==== Occupational accidents ====
An occupational accident is an incident that happens to a worker during their work or in connection with their job, regardless of what caused it or whether the worker was at fault. It can also include accidents that occur while travelling between the worker's home, or the place where they normally have their meals, and their workplace or the place where they collect their salary. However, the journey must be directly related to work and must not be interrupted or changed for personal reasons. Similarly, accidents that happen during journeys paid for by the employer under the applicable rules, or funded by another party with the employer's consent, may also be recognized as occupational accidents.

To receive benefits for occupational risks, a worker must have employment covered by the general social security system, be registered with the CNSS, and have suffered a work-related accident or contracted a work-related disease. Employers must notify the CNSS of occupational accidents within 60 days and occupational diseases within 120 days. If the employer fails to make the report or is unable to submit it, the injured worker or their eligible dependents may report the accident or disease within two years.

==== Occupational diseases, prevention, and benefits in kind ====
An occupational disease is an illness that appears on the official list of work-related diseases and develops under the conditions stated in that list. However, an illness that is not on the list may still be considered work-related if it is proven that the person's usual work was the main and direct cause of the illness and that it leads to permanent disability or death.

The CNSS is also responsible for creating and carrying out programs to prevent workplace accidents and work-related diseases. These programs aim to inform employers and insured workers about workplace hazards, encourage them to take safety measures, and help create safer working conditions.

Benefits in kind cover medical care and other services required after a work-related accident or illness. These benefits may include medical and surgical treatment, medical examinations, X-rays, laboratory tests, medicines, hospital care, and dental treatment. They may also cover transport to medical facilities and, when necessary, transport back to the worker's home. The CNSS may also provide, maintain, and replace artificial limbs and other orthopedic equipment.

The law also provides support for physical recovery, rehabilitation, and job training or reassignment for people affected by occupational accidents or diseases. These services aim to reduce the effects of the injury or illness where possible and help workers return to their jobs.

==== Cash benefits ====
Cash benefits under the occupational risks branch include daily payments for workers who are temporarily unable to work, a lump-sum allowance or pension for those with permanent disabilities, funeral expenses, pensions for surviving family members, and expenses related to functional rehabilitation or vocational reassignment. Daily allowances help workers cover their lost income while they are unable to work. For permanent disabilities, the insured person may receive a pension or a lump-sum payment, depending on the level of disability and the conditions set by law. Funeral expenses are paid to the person who covered the costs of the insured worker's funeral, according to the limits and rules set by law. If a work-related accident or disease causes the worker's death, eligible surviving family members may receive benefits under the law.

=== Family ===
The family benefits branch covers three main types of support: prenatal allowances, maternity allowances, and family allowances. However, people must be registered with the CNSS, pay the required contributions, complete the required period of insurance, and meet the residence rules. A month is usually counted toward the insurance period when the person has worked at least 15 days or 120 hours within that month.

Prenatal allowances are provided to encourage regular medical check-ups during pregnancy and help protect the health of both the mother and the child. An insured female worker or the wife of an insured male worker may receive this benefit if all the conditions are met. The pregnancy must first be declared to the CNSS within the first three months using Form F1. The CNSS then gives the beneficiary a pregnancy and maternity booklet. During the pregnancy, she must provide medical certificates confirming that she attended check-ups in the third, sixth, and eighth months. If she does not complete one of these examinations, she will lose the part of the allowance related to that period. The benefit covers all nine months of pregnancy and is paid in three separate instalments once the required medical certificates are provided.

Maternity allowances are meant to encourage women to give birth under proper medical care. They are available to insured female workers and the wives of insured male workers who meet the required conditions. To receive the allowance, the beneficiary must give birth to a child who is born alive and under medical supervision. She must also submit Form F6 along with the required medical certificate, Form F5. If twins or more children are born, each child is counted separately when calculating the allowance.

Daily maternity benefits help insured female workers cover the income they lose while on maternity leave. To qualify, the woman must stop working and take maternity leave, have been registered with the CNSS at least 12 months before the expected delivery date, and submit Form F6 with all the required documents. Maternity leave lasts 14 weeks, including six weeks before childbirth and eight weeks after childbirth. However, this period may be extended by up to 21 days if the mother develops an illness related to childbirth. The CNSS pays these benefits directly, unless a ministerial order provides for a different payment method.

Family allowances are paid to eligible workers for each child who depends on them financially. To receive these benefits, the worker must be covered by the social security system, and their employer must have registered them and paid the required contributions. The worker must also meet the rules related to work attendance or the required insurance period. The worker must then submit information about their family situation to the CNSS and report any changes when they occur. They are also required to provide the documents listed in Article 53 of Law No. 16-009 and renew them each year. These allowances can be received from the child's birth until they turn 25, provided that they are still studying and meet the conditions set by law. However, family allowances are usually stopped when the worker ends their professional activity. This rule has some exceptions, which are explained in Articles 37, 38, and 71 of the law. Employers are also allowed to provide additional family allowances on top of the benefits required by law.

=== Pension ===
The pensions branch helps protect insured people from losing their income because of retirement, disability, or the death of an insured person. The benefits provided include retirement pensions, old-age allowances, disability pensions, survivors' pensions, and survivors' lump-sum allowances.

An insured person can generally qualify for a retirement pension at the age of 60 if they have completed at least 180 months of insurance coverage and stopped all paid employment. While 60 is the age at which a worker can apply for retirement, 65 is considered the compulsory retirement age under the rules discussed. If a person has not completed the required 180 months, they may be allowed to pay for the missing contribution periods, depending on the applicable rules. This payment can cover up to five years, or 60 months, and is based on the person's most recent salary. The retirement pension is calculated at 40% of the average monthly salary for 180 months of insurance coverage. For every additional 12 months of coverage, another 2% is added, up to a maximum of 60%. To apply, the insured person must complete Form PR and submit their payslips for the last 60 months, a certificate showing the end of their employment, and a copy of their identity card.

An insured person who reaches the age of 60, stops working, and has fewer than 180 months of insurance may qualify for a lump-sum old-age allowance if they meet the other legal conditions. This payment is meant for people who do not have enough contribution months to receive a regular retirement pension.

An insured person who is at least 55 years old may apply for early retirement voluntarily or because their physical or mental health has worsened too early. In general, the person must have completed at least 180 months of insurance coverage and stopped all paid employment. The pension is calculated using the same rules as a regular retirement pension. However, if the person chooses to retire early voluntarily, the pension is reduced by 5% for each year they retire before the normal retirement age.

A disability pension may be given to an insured person who becomes disabled before turning 60 because of an accident or illness that is not related to their work. In most cases, the person must have completed at least 36 months of insurance coverage during the 60 months before the disability occurred. However, this requirement may be waived if the disability results from a non-work-related accident and the person was working in a job covered by the social security scheme and registered with the CNSS at the time. To apply for a disability pension, the person must complete Form PI1 and attach a medical certificate prepared using Form PI2. They must also provide documents showing their work history and declared salary.

Survivors' benefits are meant to provide financial support to eligible family members after an insured person dies. A survivors' pension may be paid if the deceased person was receiving an old-age pension, disability pension, or early retirement pension. It may also be provided if the person had already met the conditions for receiving a retirement or disability pension before their death, or had completed at least 180 months of insurance coverage. The people who may qualify for these benefits include the surviving spouse and eligible dependent children. In general, the spouse qualifies if the marriage took place at least six months before the insured person's death. However, exceptions may apply if the couple had a child, the widow is pregnant, or the death was caused by an accident, depending on the law. Eligible children include biological and adopted children, children under guardianship, and children whom the deceased person was legally required to support. Children who are studying may continue receiving benefits until the age of 25, as long as they meet the required conditions. The application must be completed using Form PS and submitted with the necessary documents, such as the marriage certificate and the children's birth certificates. For families whose deceased member had contributed for at least 12 months but less than 180 months, a one-time survivors' allowance may be available. Also, a surviving spouse who remarries may qualify for a separate lump-sum payment.
