= Mpozo =

Town in the Democratic Republic of the Congo

Coordinates: 05°50′00″S 13°30′00″E

Mpozo is a town in the Bas-Congo province of the Democratic Republic of the Congo near the border with Angola.

== Transport ==
The town is served by a railway station on the national network.

== See also ==
- Railway stations in DRCongo
