= Lukala Airport =

Airport in Democratic Republic of the Congo

- IATA: none; ICAO: FZAP

Summary
- Airport type: Public
- Serves: Lukala
- Elevation AMSL: 1,312 ft / 400 m
- Coordinates: 5°29′55″S 14°31′45″E

Map
- Location of the airport in Democratic Republic of the Congo

Runways
Direction	Length		Surface
Direction	m	ft	Surface
08/26	960	3,150	Gravel
- Sources: Google Maps GCM

Lukala Airport (ICAO: FZAP) is an airport serving the town of Lukala in Kongo Central Province, Democratic Republic of the Congo.

== See also ==
- Transport in the Democratic Republic of the Congo
- List of airports in the Democratic Republic of the Congo
