= Ango-Ango =

Town in Bas-Congo, Democratic Republic of the Congo

Coordinates: 05°51′00″S 13°27′00″E

Ango Ango is a town in the Bas-Congo province of the Democratic Republic of the Congo. It is located on the Eastern bank of the River Congo downstream from Matadi, South of the Chaudron d'Enfer. The port is used for the discharging of petroleum, other dangerous cargo, and for ships not powerful enough to negotiate the Chaudron d'Enfer.

== Transport ==
It is the terminus of a branch line of the national railway system.

It is a port for ship and cargo.

Latitude: 5° 46' 8" S

Longitude: 13° 26' 39" E

== See also ==
- Railway stations in DRCongo
