= Kamwandu =

Town and sector in Kasaï-Central Province, Democratic Republic of the Congo

- Sector
- Location within Democratic Republic of the Congo
- Country: DR Congo
- Province: Kasaï-Central
- Territory: Dibaya

Kamwandu is a town and sector in Kasai-Central province of southern Democratic Republic of the Congo. It is part of the Dibaya Territory. Child soldiers were recruited from the town during the Kamwina Nsapu rebellion.

A Médecins Sans Frontières medical center for survivors of sexual violence is located in the town.

== Transport ==
It is served by a station on the national railway network.

== See also ==
- Railway stations in DRCongo
