= União dos Sindicatos Revolucionarios de Angola =

Angolan trade union in exile

União dos Sindicatos Revolucionarios de Angola ('Union of Revolutionary Trade Unions of Angola', abbreviated USRA) was an Angolan trade union organization in exile. USRA was founded in Songololo, Congo-Kinshasa in November 1965 by dissidents from LGTA led by Manuel Francisco Bento (that had rebelled against the pro-Holden Roberto leadership of LGTA in June 1965) and another dissident group from UNTA (led by former UNTA Foreign Secretary, i.e. second-in-command in the organization, Bernard Dombele). Dombele had accused UNTA of 'political deviation'. The organization opened an office in Kinshasa in April 1966.

As of 1967, USRA had ceased to exist.
