= Lusuku =

Coordinates: 07°20′00″S 23°52′00″E

Lusuku is a town in the Lomami province of the Democratic Republic of the Congo.

== Transport ==
It is served by a station on the national railway system.
