= Kimpese =

- Location in Democratic Republic of the Congo
- Coordinates: 5°33′47″S 14°26′45″E
- Country: Democratic Republic of the Congo
- Province: Kongo Central

Kimpese is a town in the Cataractes District of Kongo Central province, Democratic Republic of the Congo. It lies on the main road and railway between Kinshasa and the provincial capital Matadi, at an altitude of 990 ft (301 m) above sea level.

There are tributaries of the Congo River to the north and south of the town. Kimpese has a hospital, medical training centre, high school, technical training institute and an agricultural college. The 400 bed Kimpese hospital serves 150,000 people in the local area and another 600,000 in the surrounding district. The town also contains an office of the UNHCR, which provides assistance to the nearly 60,000 Angolan refugees in Kongo Central province. Kimpese's population is approximately 40,000; and although DRC is a mainly Catholic country, the town has a Protestant majority.

== See also ==
- Railway stations in DRCongo
