= Mbanza-Ngungu =

- Commune
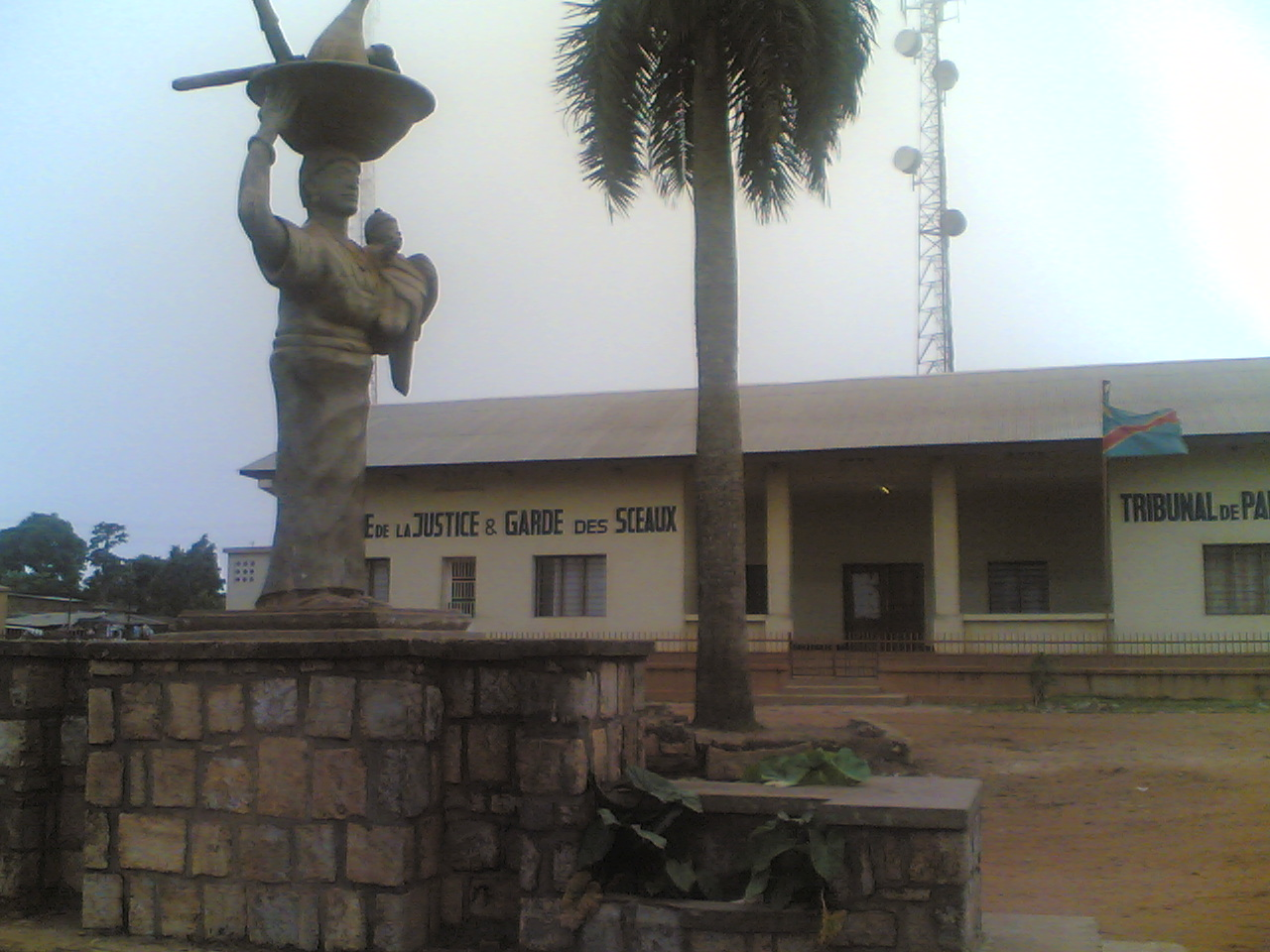
- Mama Mvati Mpatu Monument in front of the courthouse
- location of Mbanza-Ngungu within territory
- Coordinates: 5°15′S 14°52′E
- Country: DR Congo
- Province: Kongo Central
- Territory: Mbanza-Ngungu

Population (2004)
  - Total: 100,000
- Time zone: UTC+1 (WAT)

Mbanza-Ngungu, formerly known as Thysville or Thysstad, named after Albert Thys, is a large town in Kongo Central Province in the western part of the Democratic Republic of Congo, lying on a short branch off the Matadi-Kinshasa Railway. It has a population of nearly 100,000 people and is the administrative center of Mbanza-Ngungu Territory.

== Overview ==
Formerly known as a resort town, it is home to the Thysville Caves, which encompass the entire range of the colourless African blind barb. It is home to a major FARDC garrison: the 1st Armoured Brigade was based here during the early 1990s period. The 1st Armoured Brigade was first listed in the IISS Military Balance in the 1982–1983 edition, implying that the brigade may have been created during that period. The city's other main industry is railway engineering.

The city is currently the main site of Kongo University.

== Notable people ==
- Daniel Mukoko Samba (born 1959), politician

== Gallery ==
Swiss photographer Annemarie Schwarzenbach, took photos from May 1941 until March 1942. They are shown below.

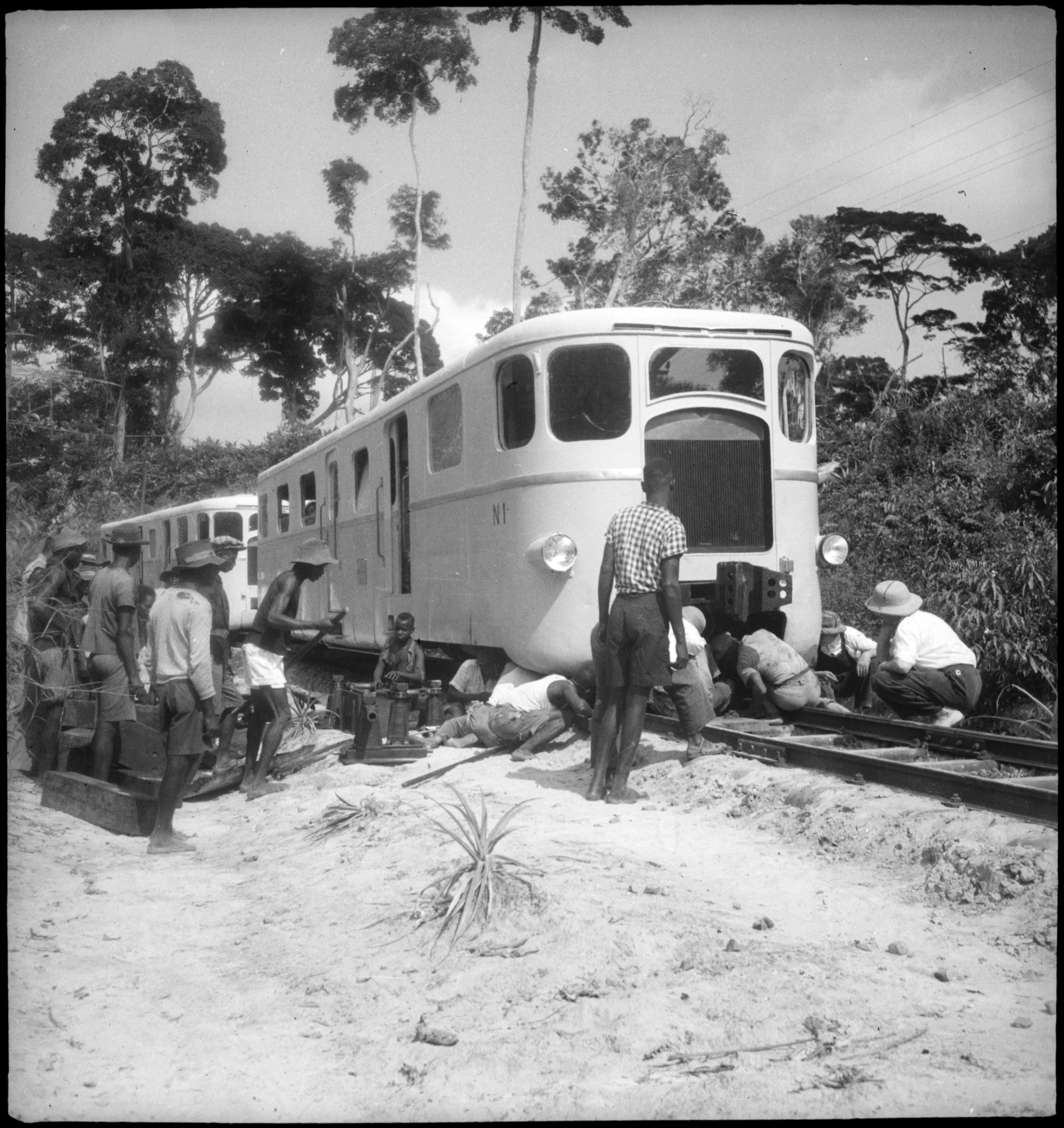
Two (2) trains, one has derailed, the other came to help.

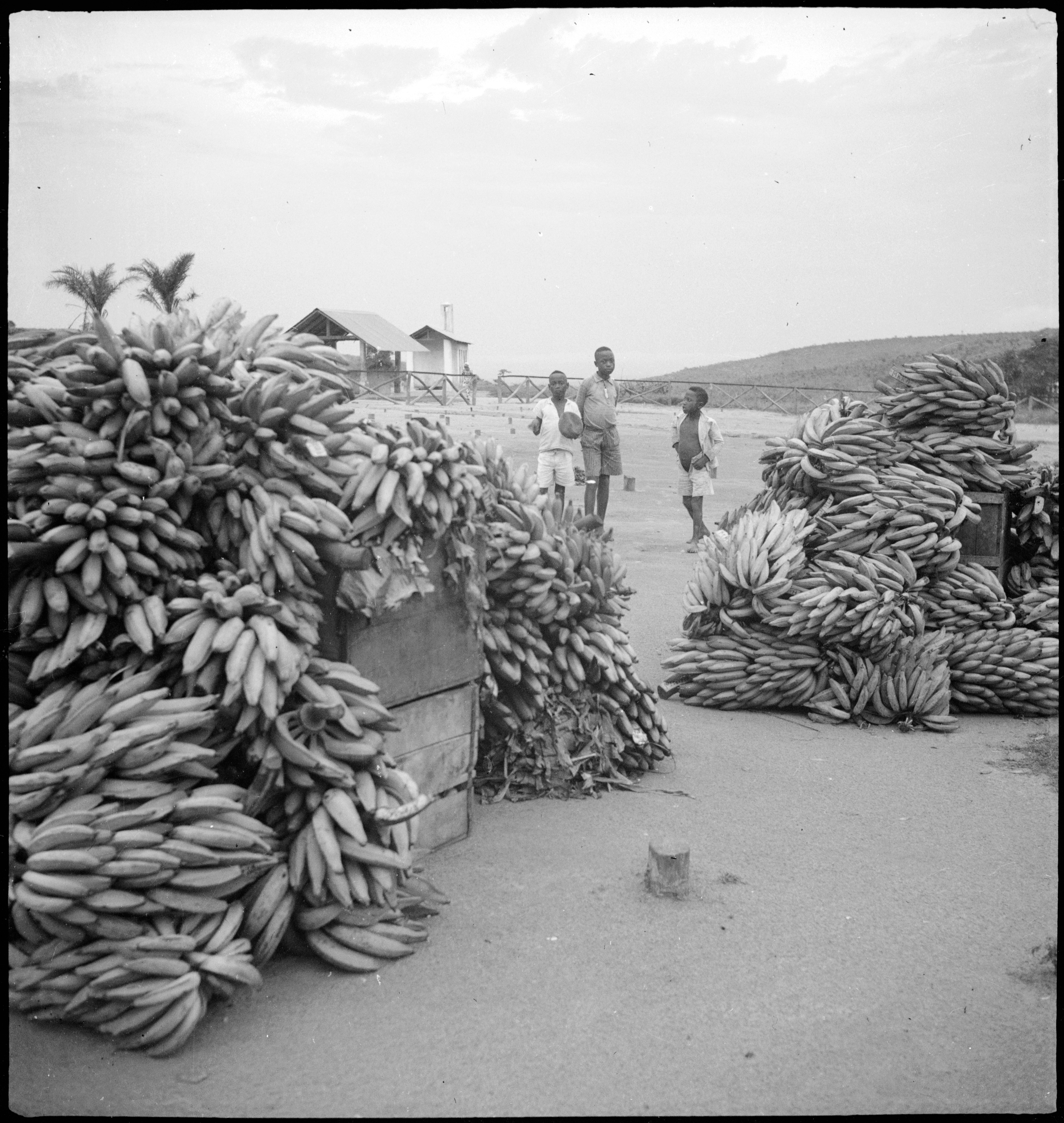
Daily life.

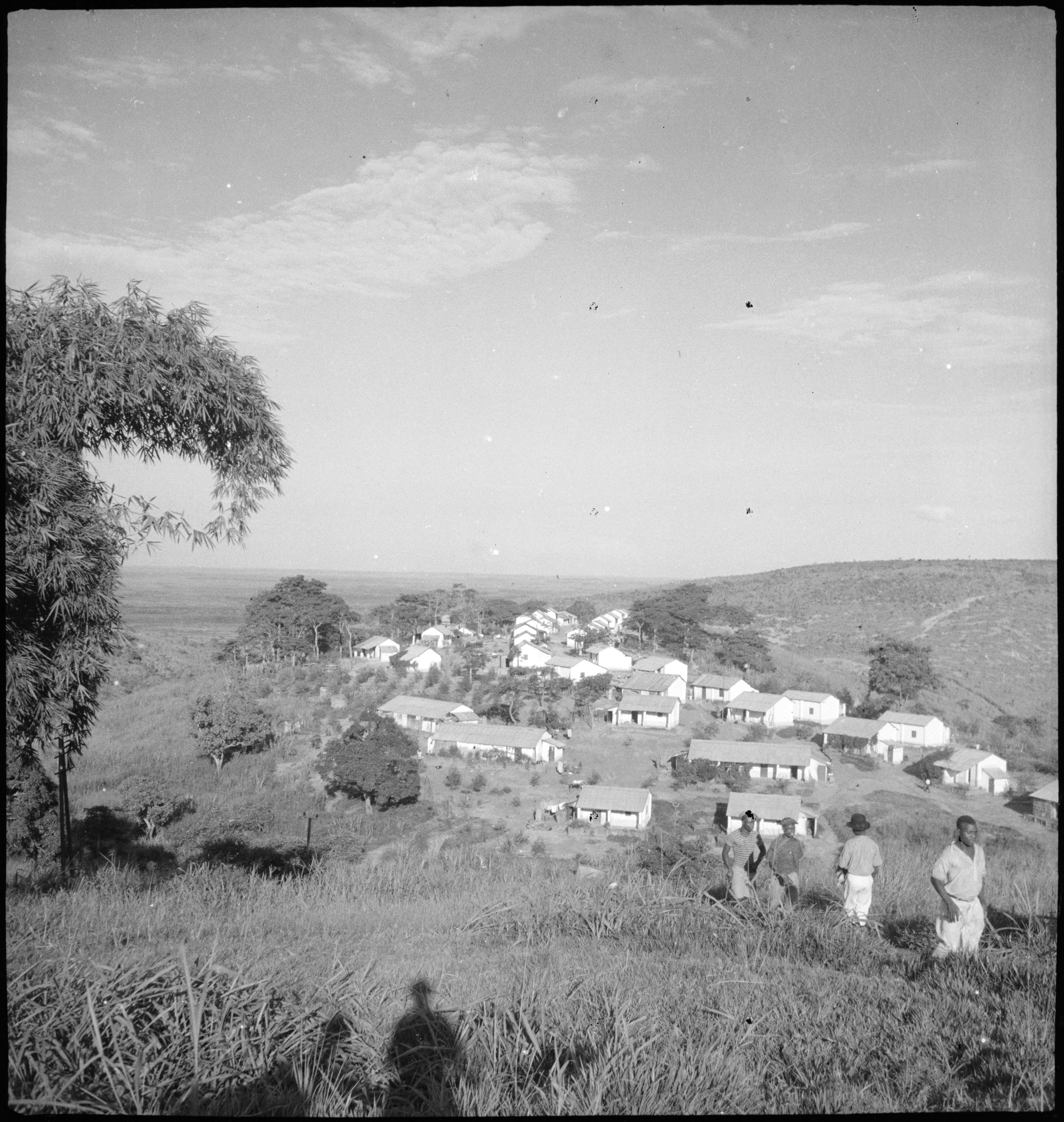
View of the village.

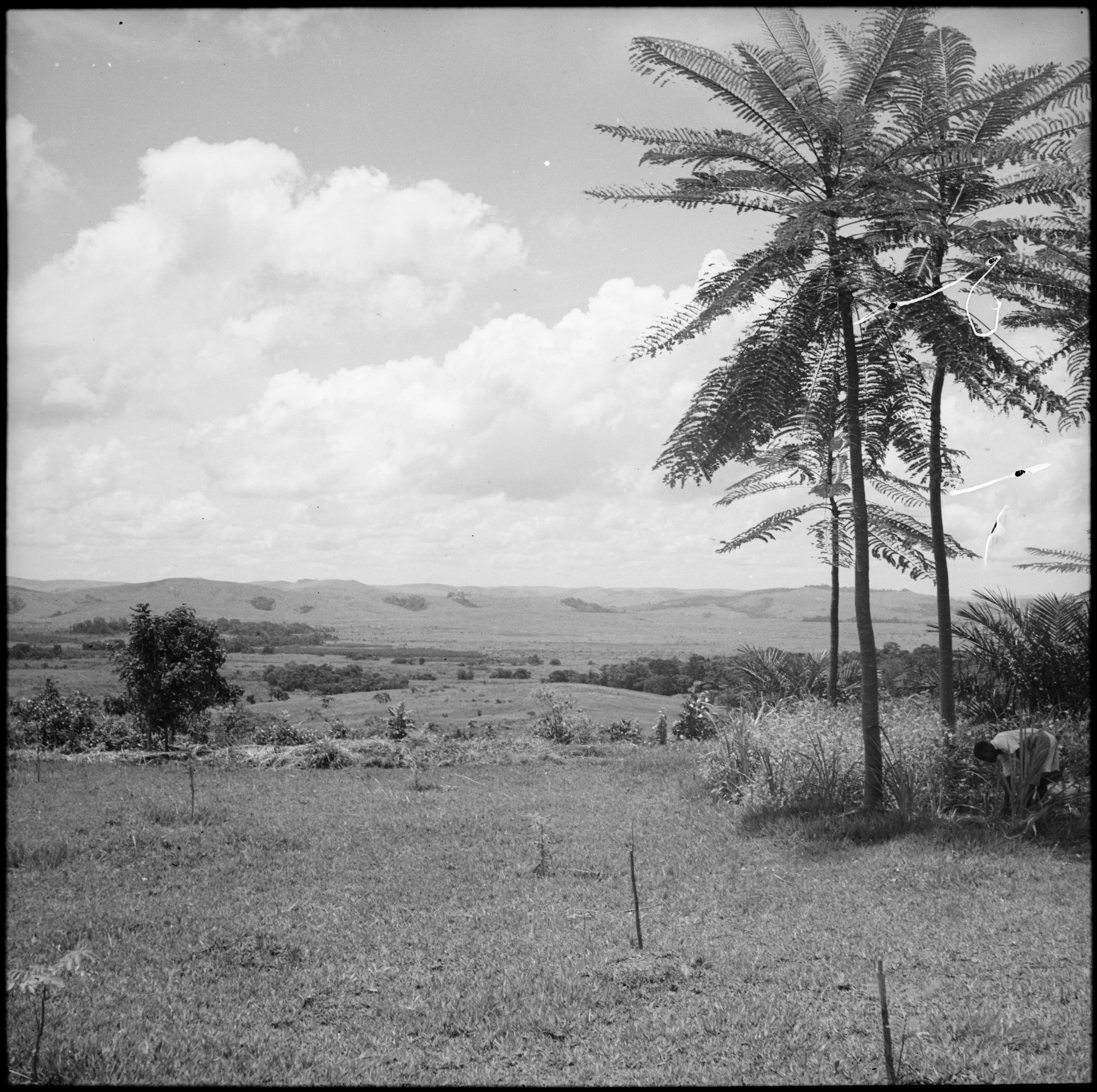
Hills around Mbanza-Ngungu.

== See also ==
- List of railway stations in the Democratic Republic of the Congo
- Tintin in the Congo
