= Lukala =

- Location within Democratic Republic of the Congo
- Country: DR Congo
- Province: Kongo Central

Population
  - Total: 40,000 (2,014 est.)
- Time zone: UTC+1 (WAT)

Lukala is a town in Kongo-Central province, Democratic Republic of the Congo. The town is known for its cement factory, which has operated since 1921.

== Transport ==
Lukala is served by Lukala Airport and by a station on the Congo Railway network. The town is located on National Highway 1.

== Industry ==
Lukala has a cement works.

== See also ==
- Railway stations in DR Congo
