= Benaleka =

Coordinates: 05°08′00″S 22°10′00″E

Benaleka or Bena-Leka is a settlement in Kasai-Central, Democratic Republic of the Congo. It is located 220 km (137 mi) northwest of Kananga. The elevation is 467 m (1,532 ft).

== Transport ==
Benaleka is served by a station on the national railway system.

On August 1, 2007, a train derailed near Benaleka, killing more than 100 people. Brake failure appears to be the cause.

== See also ==
- Railway stations in DRCongo
