= Bakwa-Kasanga =

Town in the Democratic Republic of Congo

Coordinates: 04°31′00″S 21°07′00″E

Bakwa-Kasanga is a town in central Democratic Republic of the Congo.

== Transport ==
The town is served by a station on the national railway network.

== See also ==
- List of railway stations in the Democratic Republic of the Congo
