= Kilembe, DR Congo =

Kilembe
- Location in Democratic Republic of the Congo
- Coordinates: 5°42′36″S 19°54′0″E
- Country: Democratic Republic of the Congo
- Province: Kwilu

Kilembe is a community in Kwilu province, Democratic Republic of the Congo (DRC).
