= Songololo =

Human settlement in DR Congo

Coordinates: 05°42′00″S 14°02′00″E

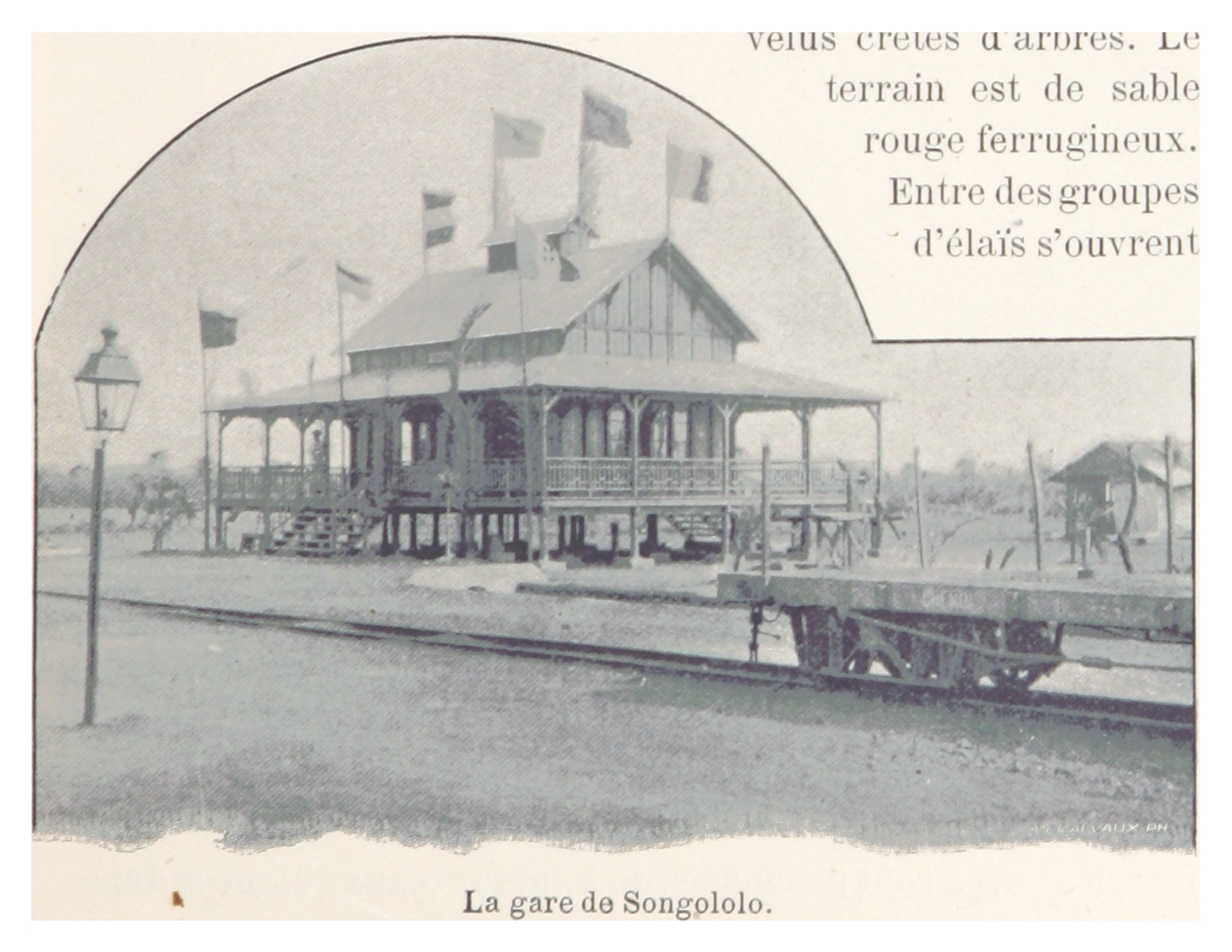
The Station of Songololo (1899)

Songololo is a town in Kongo Central Province in the Democratic Republic of the Congo.

== Transport ==
It is served by a station of the national railway system on the line between the ocean port and the capital of Kinshasa.

== See also ==
- Railway stations in DRCongo
- União dos Sindicatos Revolucionarios de Angola (trade union)
