= Kintambo =

- Commune
- Commune de Kintambo
- Kintambo on map of Kinshasa city-province
- Location in DR Congo
- Coordinates: 04°20′30″S 15°16′04″E
- Country: DR Congo
- City-Province: Kinshasa

Area
  - Total: 2.72 km^{2} (1.05 sq mi)

Population (2004 est.)
  - Total: 106,772
  - Density: 39,300/km^{2} (102,000/sq mi)

Kintambo is a municipality (commune) in the Lukunga district of Kinshasa, the capital city of the Democratic Republic of the Congo.

It is situated in the northwest of the city of Kinshasa, at the junction of Boulevard du 30 Juin (or more accurately its short extension, Avenue du Colonel Mondjiba), Avenue Kasa-Vubu and Route de Matadi.

== Demographics ==
Historical population
Year	1967	1970	1984	2003	2004
Pop.	29,890	38,748	49,297	103,257	106,772
±%	—	+29.6%	+27.2%	+109.5%	+3.4%
