= Matadi–Kinshasa Railway =

Railway line in Democratic Republic of the Congo

Coordinates: 5.8195°S 13.4912°E

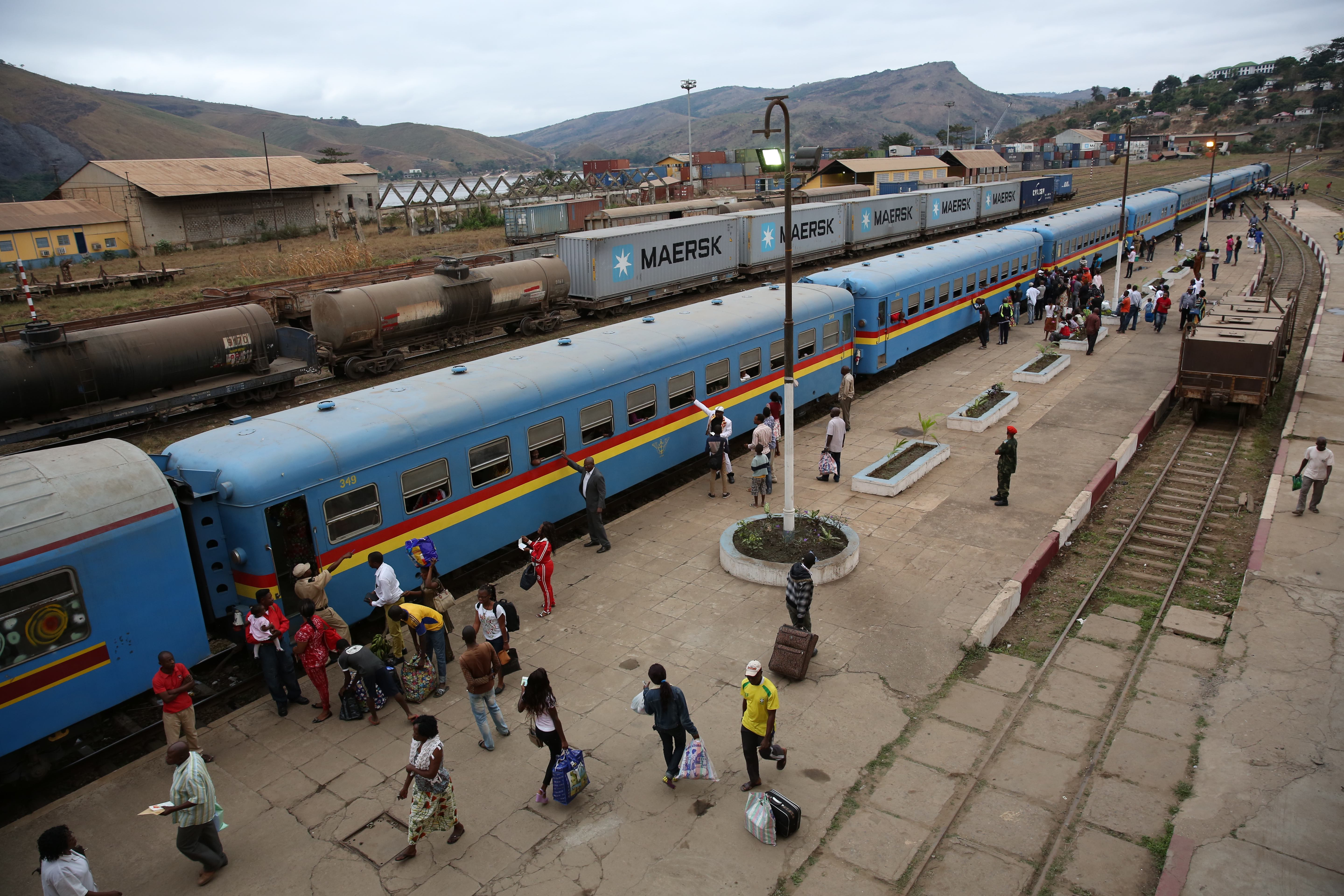
- Matadi train station, September 2015

Overview
- Other name: Chemin de fer Matadi-Kinshasa (French)
- Termini: Matadi; Kinshasa Est

History
- Commenced: 1890
- Completed: 1898

Technical
- Line length: 366 km (227 mi)
- Track gauge: 1,067 mm (3 ft 6 in)

The Matadi–Kinshasa Railway (French: Chemin de fer Matadi-Kinshasa) is a railway line in Kongo Central province between Kinshasa, the capital of Democratic Republic of the Congo, and the port of Matadi.

The Matadi–Kinshasa Railway was built between 1890 and 1898 in order to bypass the series of rapids and falls which hindered access from the South Atlantic Ocean to the Congo Basin. Its length is 366 km (227 mi) and it is run by Société commerciale des transports et des ports (SCTP) (until 2011, ONATRA). The line reopened in September 2015 after about a decade without regular service. As of April, 2016 there was one passenger trip per week along the line and more frequent service was planned. Services between Kasangulu to Kinshasa resumed in 2019. From September 3, 2025, the KiHa 183 series trains transferred from JR Hokkaido will be running on Saturdays and Sundays.

== History ==
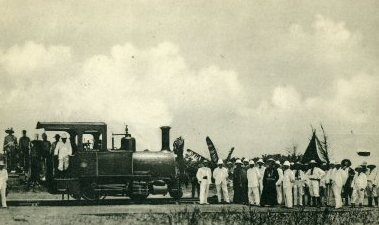
The first locomotive arriving at Léopoldville in 1898

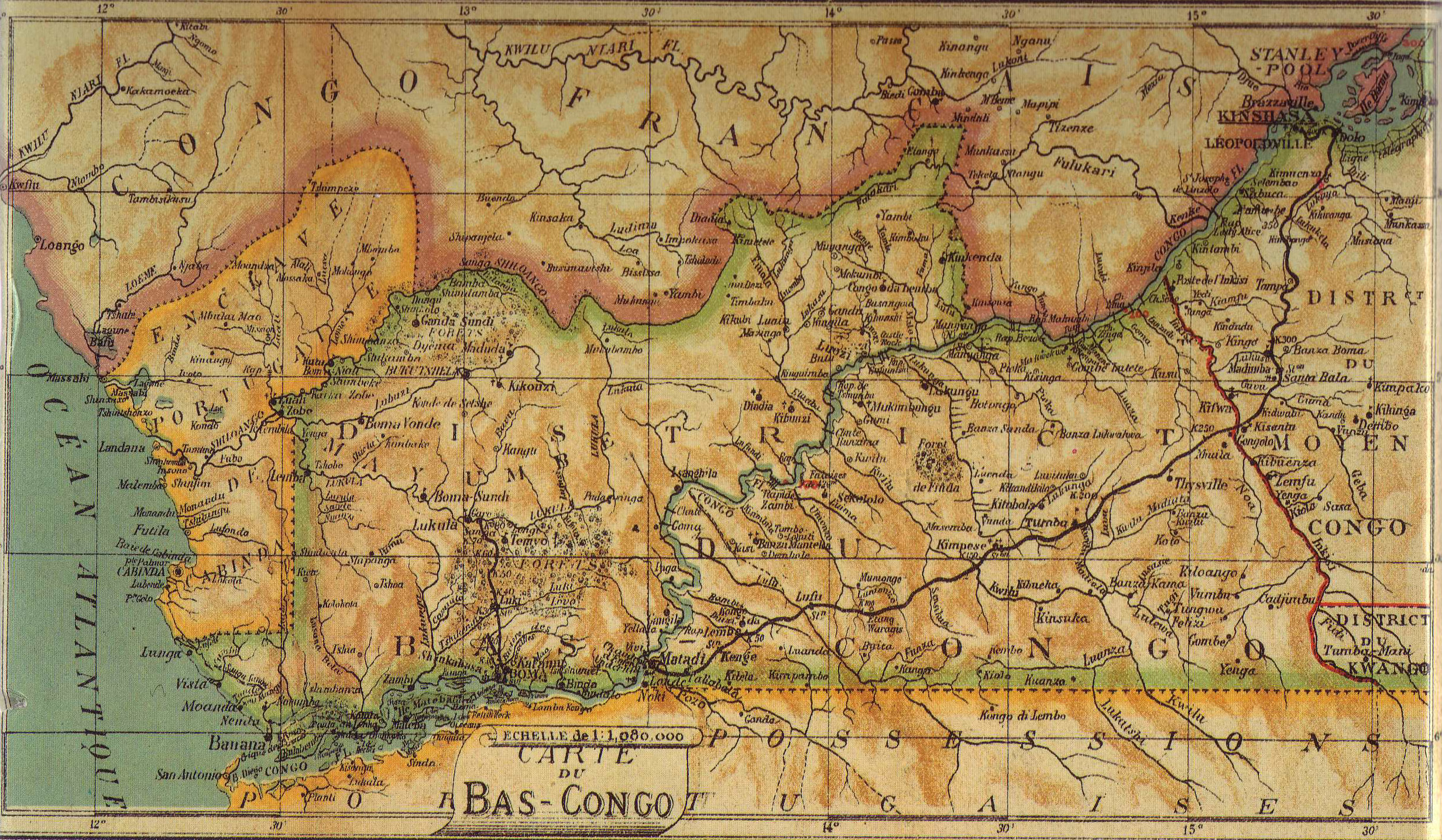
The line in 1913 (with also the first section of the Mayumbe Railway in the North)

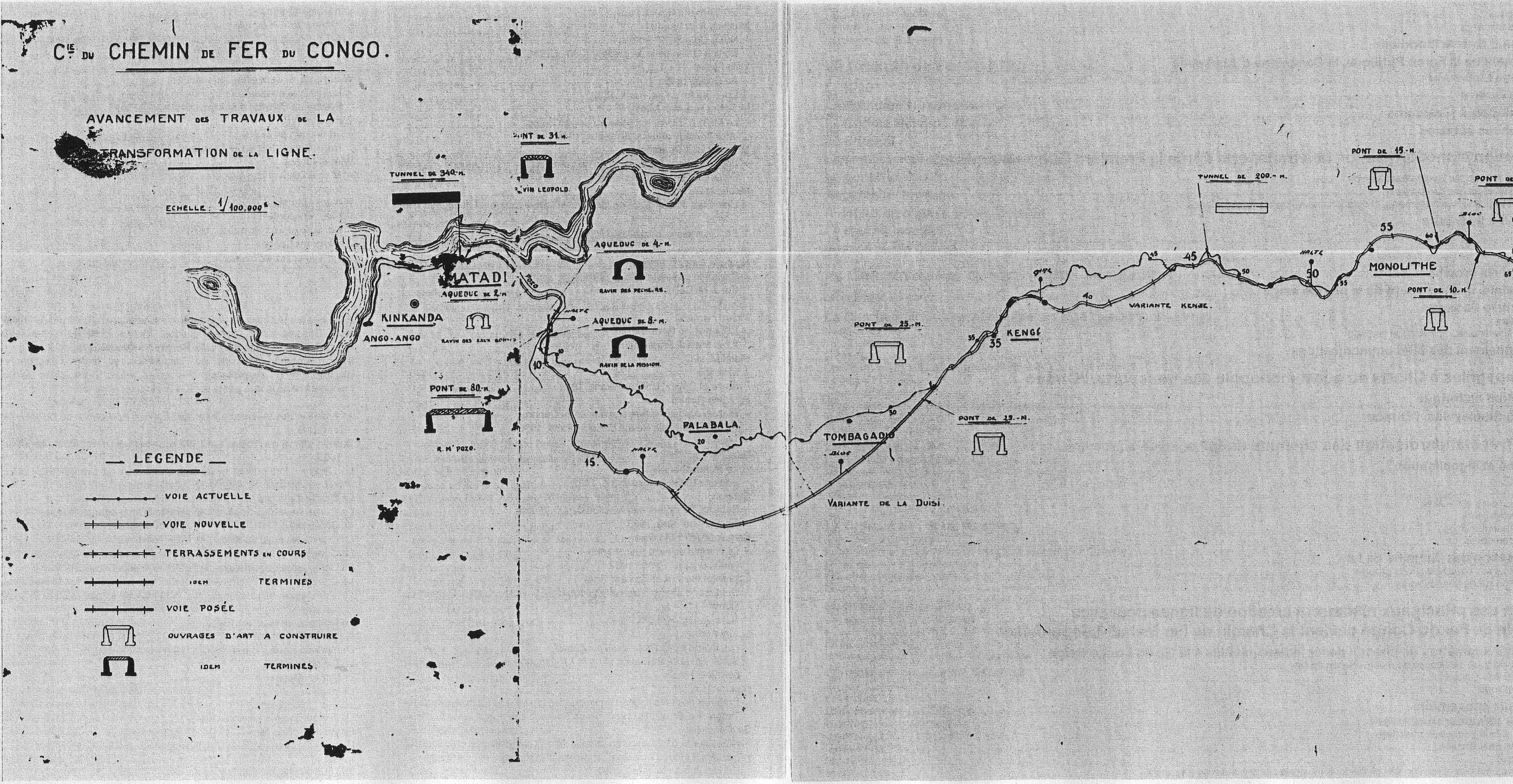
The new track as it could be seen on 25 July 1927 (engineer's map).

In the 1880s the exploration and exploitation of the Congo territory was carried out by the Congo Free State, which benefitted from hydrographic network of the Congo River. But between Matadi and Kinshasa (formerly known as Léopoldville), the river was not navigable, being barred by the Livingstone Falls, which follow one another for 300 km (190 mi). Transport was done by human bearers, which was not very efficient and often fatal. Therefore, it was decided to build a railway line along this route.

The Compagnie du Congo pour le Commerce et l'Industrie (CCCI) was incorporated on 31 July 1887. On the same day its subsidiary the Compagnie du Chemin de Fer du Congo (CCFC) was created. Work on the railway was directed by Albert Thys, who would give his name to one of the stations, Thysville (now Mbanza-Ngungu). The completion of the railway officially cost the lives of 1,932 people (1,800 Africans and 132 Europeans), although the real numbers were likely higher. Up to 60,000 labourers worked on the project at one time.

The main difficulty was to make it possible for the railway line to leave the gorges of the Congo River, through the canyon of the M'pozo River and a passage along the Monts de Cristal.

The living conditions in the construction of this railway were miserable. The sanitary and medical facilities were insufficient. In 1892, about two thousand people worked on the railroad, of which an average of one hundred and fifty workers per month lost their lives due to smallpox, dysentery, beriberi and exhaustion. By the end of 1892, 7,000 workers had already been recruited, 3,500 of whom had died or fled (for example, to neighboring forests). These conditions made it more difficult to recruit workers. Thys therefore attracted people from Barbados and China in September and November 1892 respectively. The Barbadians refused to leave the boats in the port of Matadi until they were forced by firearms. Seven people lost their lives in this action.

The hard labour on the railway line is mentioned by Joseph Conrad in his novel Heart of Darkness, which he witnessed when he worked in the Congo Free State. It is also shown in the 2016 movie The Legend of Tarzan.

Started in 1890, the railway line was completed in 1898. It was built to a nominal gauge of 750 mm (2 ft 5 1/2 in), and all rolling stock was constructed to this gauge. However, as local labour had difficulty grasping the concept of gauge widening on curves, the entire line was built to a gauge of 765 mm (2 ft 6 1/8 in). Alterations were made from 1923 to 1931, when it was converted to 3 ft 6 in (1,067 mm) gauge on a new alignment. Several tens of thousands of people, convicts and forced workers, were employed for this renovation. Seven thousand people lost their lives here.

In spite of the technical and financial difficulties related to the construction of the railway line, the railway line very quickly proved to be profitable, mainly because of the transportation of ivory and rubber. As a 750 mm (2 ft 5 1/2 in) gauge railway it operated a large fleet of 0-6-0T, 0-6-2T, 2-6-2T locomotives before turning to 32 0-6-0+0-6-0 Garratts, and finally 5 - outside-framed 2-8-2 locomotives.

The railway can be classified as a portage railway.

=== Border change ===
In 1928, Congo (Belgium) and Angola (Portugal) did a land exchange to facilitate the new route of the railway to Congo-Kinshasa.

== Specifications ==
	1898-1932	1932–present
Route	original	deviation
Gauge	750 mm (2 ft 5 1/2 in)	1,067 mm (3 ft 6 in)
Rails	21.5 kg/m (43.3 lb/yd)	33.4 kg/m (67.3 lb/yd)
Axle load	10 t (11 short tons; 10 long tons)	15 t (17 short tons; 15 long tons)
Length	401 km (249 mi)	365 km (227 mi)
Grade (max.)	45‰ (4.5%)	17‰ (1.7%)
Radius (min.)	55 yd (50.3 m)	273 yd (249.6 m)

== Main stations ==
- Matadi (elevation: 1 m), ocean port up river
- Songololo (301 m)
- Mbanza-Ngungu (604 m), terminus of short branch; workshops
- Kintoni (380 m)
- Madimba (438 m)
- Kasangulu (339 m)
- Kinshasa (177 m) railhead, river port and national capital.

== 21st century ==
The railway line and the port of Matadi are the main connection for Kinshasa to the external world. The renovation of the Road to Matadi, in beginning of the 2000s, however somewhat alleviated this situation.

Over time, the rolling stock of the Matadi-Kinshasa line fell into disrepair, so it became increasingly dangerous. In 2003, a train derailment resulted in 11 deaths, and the line immediately fell into disuse, which endured for over a decade.

Angola proposed, in 2012, to link its three isolated lines, and also to link with adjacent countries including the Matadi-Kinshasa line. By using the Matadi Bridge (formerly a road-rail bridge), a connection to the Cabinda enclave is possible.

The line reopened in September 2015 after over a decade without regular service. As of April, 2016 there was one passenger trip per week along the line and more frequent service was planned.

In August 2019, suburban services between Kasangulu to Kinshasa resumed, along with freight transport between Kinshasa and Matadi. Traffic was suspended in 2020 and only restated on 5 September 2025.

In 2024, seven ex JR Hokkaido railcars were sold as part of a $500m rail modernaisation program in D.R Congo to be utilised on the line.

== See also ==
- Congo-Ocean Railway in the Republic of Congo.
- Congo Railway
- List of rail accidents (2000–present)
- Minimum railway curve radius
- Rail transport in the Democratic Republic of the Congo
