= Msufini Tanzania Limited =

Chemical manufacturer

Coordinates: 06°43′21″S 38°45′15″E

- Company type: Private
- Industry: Manufacture of Industrial Chemicals
- Founded: 2018
- Headquarters: Mlandizi, Bagamoyo District, Pwani Region, Tanzania
- Products: Chlorine, sodium hydroxide

Msufini Tanzania Limited (MTL) is a manufacturer of chlorine and sodium hydroxide in Tanzania. Both chemicals are used in the disinfection of water, for human consumption, animal consumption and in swimming pools. When completed as expected in 2020, the company's factory will consume an estimated 2,500 tonnes of salt monthly. The products of this company are expected to save Tanzanian water authorities scarce foreign exchange as a result of being able to source water treatment chemicals, domestically.

== Location ==
The main factory of the company is located in Mlandizi, Bagamoyo District, Pwani Region, approximately 145 kilometres (90 mi), by road, south-west of Bagamoyo, the location of the district headquarters. Mlandzi is located about 54 kilometres (34 mi), by road, north-west of Dar es Salaam, the largest city and financial capital of Tanzania.

== Overview and history ==
Msufini Company Limited was formed to design, build, operate and maintain a chemical plant that will turn 2,500 tonnes of un-iodized salt (Sodium chloride), into chlorine and lye (Sodium hydroxide), on a monthly basis. The construction of the factory began on 25 April 2018, with commissioning expected in March 2020.

The design calls for a capacity of 1,350 tonnes of chlorine per month (45 tonnes daily). When completed, the manufacturing facility is expected to employ 1,000 people. Other products are expected on the market after the chlorine need is met. It is expected that 20 percent of output will be marketed locally, while 80 percent is marked to the countries of the East African Community, Asia and the European Union.

== Ownership ==
Msufini Tanzania Limited operates as a 100 percent subsidiary of Sufini Holding Limited, a joint venture company co-owned by Junaco Tanzania Limited, a wholly Tanzanian private company (Junaco), and Serba Dinamik Holdings Berhad (Serba Dinamik), a Malaysian oil and gas services company.

The table below illustrates the shareholding in the stock of Sufini Holdings Limited, the 100% owner of Msufini Tanzania Limited.

Sufini Holdings Limited Stock Ownership
| Rank | Name of Owner | Percentage Ownership |
|---|---|---|
| 1 | Junaco Tanzania Limited of Tanzania | 75.0 |
| 2 | Serba Dinamik Holdings Berhad of Malaysia | 25.0 |
| | Total | 100.00 |

== Construction ==
The cost of constructing the factory is budgeted at TSh256 billion (approximately US$112 million). Construction began on 25 April 2018, with commissioning expected within two years.

== See also ==
- Water supply and sanitation in Tanzania
- Water privatization in Dar es Salaam
- Ministry of Water and Irrigation
