= Matete Market =

Marketplace in Matete, Kinshasa

Coordinates: 4°23′32″S 15°20′50″E

- French: Marché de Matete
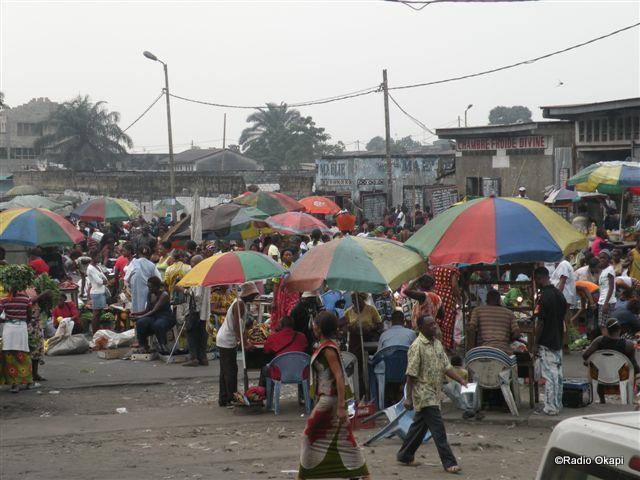
- Matete Market in 2010
- Interactive map of the Matete Market area
- Alternative names: Matete Municipal Market

General information
- Location: Matete, Kinshasa, Democratic Republic of the Congo
- Year built: 1968; 58 years ago
- Owner: Matete

The Matete Market (French: Marché de Matete), also known as Matete Municipal Market (Marché Municipal de Matete), is a marketplace located in Matete, Kinshasa. Situated in the southern part of the city on a marshy alluvial plain, it is the third-largest market in Kinshasa and a vital economic center for the surrounding area. The market features a diverse range of sales facilities, categorized into four types based on their level of equipment and the income levels of the businesses operating within them. These include enclosed shops and store, semi-open pavilions supported by structural posts, vendor tables, and rudimentary open-air setups at ground level.

== Profile ==
=== Location ===
The Matete Market, established in 1968, is located in the Matete commune of Kinshasa, within the southern sector of the city atop a marshy alluvial plain. Geographically, it is bordered by the Tomba and Kinzazi neighborhoods to the north, the Bahumbu and Mpudi neighborhoods to the south, the Mutoto neighborhood to the east, and the Kinsaku neighborhood and the Matete municipal building to the west.

=== Administration ===
The governance of the Matete Market is overseen by a management committee comprising a permanent administrator and two subordinate assistant administrators. These assistants handle specific responsibilities: one focuses on financial matters, while the other addresses technical and environmental issues. These administrators are appointed by the governor of Kinshasa in accordance with the provisions stipulated in the 1993 decree governing the operational and structural organization of public marketplaces.

=== Revenue ===
The Matete Market generates significant revenue primarily through taxes collected within the market. As a decentralized entity, the Matete commune benefits from state subsidies in addition to the market's tax income. However, the State retains a substantial share of the market's revenues, which are funneled back into public administration.

== Sanitation ==
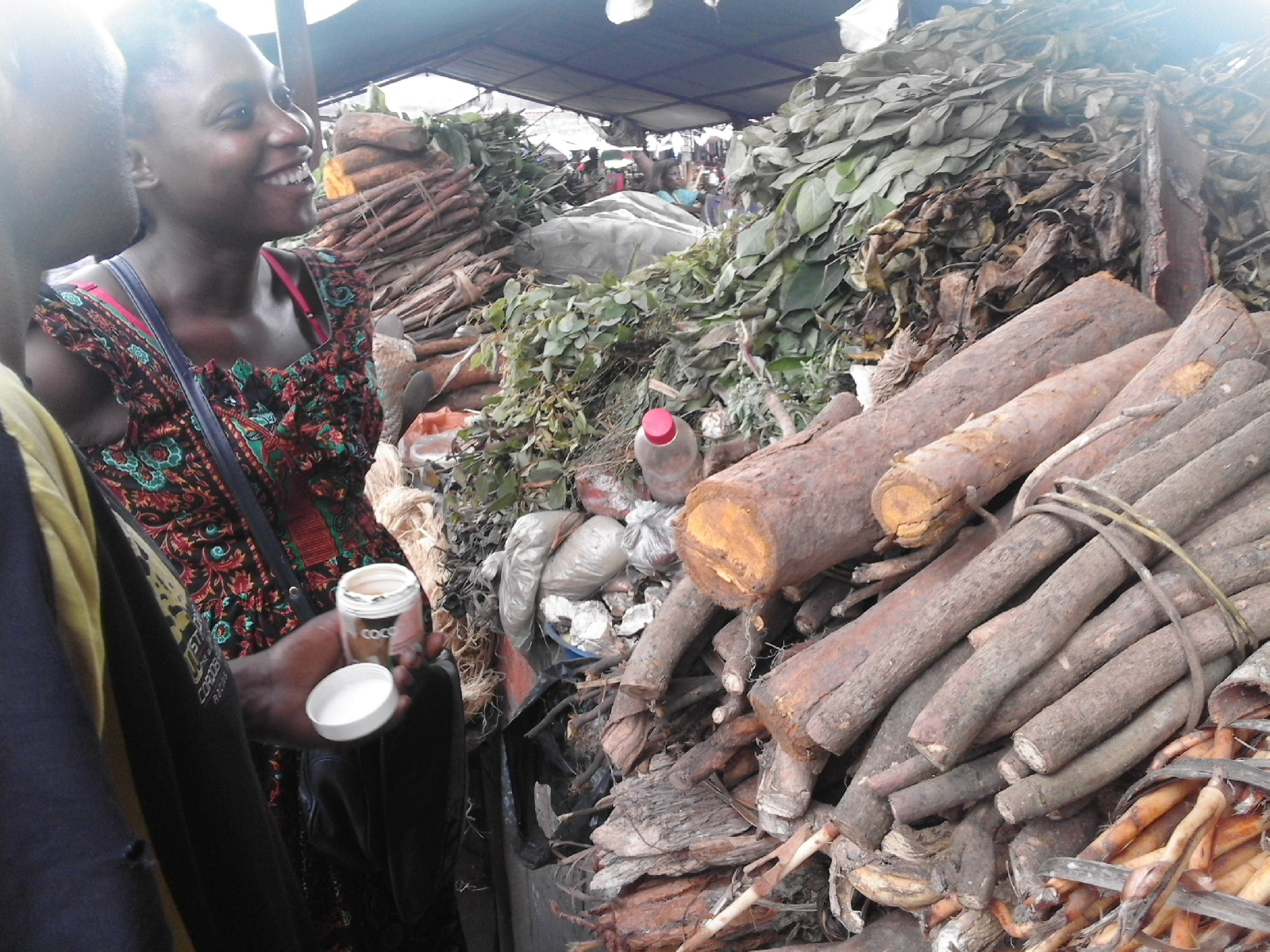
Traditional goods at Matete Market

The market's sanitation conditions are marked by significant challenges due to its disorganized infrastructure and the proliferation of informal trading activities. Characterized by the unregulated expansion of unstable constructions, the market has, since the early 2000s, been temporarily displaced to the streets encircling its original site. This has led to the creation of "parallel markets" where street vendors frequently occupy adjacent areas, sometimes outnumbering the official vendors within the designated market spaces. The rapid expansion of these makeshift installations has exacerbated issues related to the organization, maintenance, and cleanliness of the market. The management of the market falls under the jurisdiction of the Matete commune, which is responsible for both its development and upkeep, including the collection of market fees. However, the market suffers from a lack of essential infrastructure, most notably in the form of water access. Water points are absent, yet essential for a variety of tasks including drinking, cleaning, and maintaining hygiene at food stalls, particularly those dealing with fresh produce, meat, and fish. The scarcity of water has contributed to the rise in the sale of sachet water, which has become a major environmental concern, with discarded sachets contributing significantly to the accumulation of waste throughout the market.

While the market authority is tasked with the maintenance and waste disposal, their efforts remain insufficient to address the scale of the problem. Vendors contribute to waste management through daily payments, which vary depending on the volume of waste generated, but the services provided do not meet the market's needs. The waste management issues are particularly acute among food vendors, especially butchers and small processing units, who produce large quantities of waste that are difficult to manage hygienically. Sanitary facilities within the market are outdated, located some distance away from the active trading areas, and poorly maintained. The situation worsened with the delayed modernization efforts in 2011, which left some vendors without proper stalls in the renovated areas. Consequently, the market continues to struggle with sanitation, as garbage often clogs gutters, leading to flooding that obstructs access to the market for both vendors and customers. The piles of waste are sometimes found near food stalls, with some vendors resorting to displaying their goods directly on old bags or cardboard placed on the damp ground. Despite these challenges, food and second-hand clothing stalls remain the most prevalent and abundant sections within the market.
