= WPM =

WPM may refer to:

== Organizations ==
- Windermere Property Management, another name for Windermere Real Estate
- World Patent Marketing, a fraudulent US invention promotion firm
- Wheaton Precious Metals, precious metal streaming companies

== Other uses ==
- White power music, various white-supremacist music styles
- Words per minute, a measure of how many words a person or system can read or write in that amount of time
- Water point mapping, a tool for monitoring the distribution and status of water supplies
- Windows Package Manager
