= Water privatisation in Dar es Salaam =

Water privatisation in Dar es Salaam began with the award of a 10-year lease contract signed in 2003 for Dar es Salaam, the largest city and former capital of Tanzania. It was signed between the government of Tanzania and City Water, a consortium consisting of the former British firm Biwater, Gauff Engineers from Germany and a Tanzanian company called Superdoll. The Tanzanian government terminated the lease contract in May 2005 amid mutual allegations of breach of contract, and deported the three top executives of City Water. Though the stated goals of privatising and liberalising were to lower costs and increase safe water access, in fact Biwater imposed higher fees and needed more water infrastructure, resulting in less availability and a lack of transparency.

== History ==
According to a report of ActionAid, before privatisation "the water system in Dar es Salaam was hardly a model of public sector efficiency." Until 1991, water was provided for free, except for some high income areas. The system was characterised by "disrepair, a lack of investment, high levels of wastage, and very poor levels of service coverage". In 1997 the semi-autonomous utility DAWASA was created and water tariffs were introduced for all users. According to the report, "DAWASA proved to be no better than its predecessor, and the wastage and disrepair reached crisis levels." By 2003 "only 98,000 households in a city of 2.5 million people had house connections. Only 26% of water was being billed, 60% was lost through leaks, and a further 13% through unauthorised use, illegal taps and non-payers. Even those with connections only received water irregularly, and the water quality was poor. In low-income areas, the vast majority of households had no water connection at all, relying instead on buying water from kiosks, water vendors or their neighbours, at more than three times the price."

The Dublin Statement of 1992 pushed for more participatory engagement within policy framing for water in countries around the world. In Tanzania, water access was being monitored as part of international development loan conditions. Simultaneously, the entire globe was in an economic crisis. However, the World Bank pushed the Structural Adjustment Program to alleviate the crisis, which in turn led to water privatisation and an increase in poverty levels

== Donor support and conditionality ==
External donor investment produced the lease contract through soft loans worth US$145.5 million for a Dar es Salaam Water Supply and Sanitation Project approved by the World Bank in 2003. The African Development Bank contributed US$48m, the European Investment Bank US$34m and the World Bank US$61.5m. The private company was supposed to contribute US$8.5m from its own funds and the Tanzanian government was supposed to contribute US$12.6m.

The World Bank and the International Monetary Fund set conditions for further loans to Tanzania contingent on the privatisation of state-run organisations. According to research by ActionAid, in 2000 the "signing of a concession agreement assigning the assets of DAWASA (the public utility for Dar es Salaam) to private management companies" was included as a condition for debt relief under the HIPC initiative. When lack of investor interest meant that Tanzania was unable to comply with this condition, donors agreed to waive it. They then asked for a lease contract instead of a concession, implying a shorter contract duration and less responsibilities transferred to the private company. Still according to ActionAid "there has been very little meaningful public participation or consultation, limited public debate, and no transparency around the privatization process. Even the country’s elected MPs have been kept largely in the dark."

The Department for International Development paid Adam Smith International, sister organisation of the neo-liberal UK thinktank Adam Smith Institute, more than £500,000 to provide advice to the Tanzanian government. More than £250,000 of that sum was spent by Adam Smith International on a video which included the words: "Our old industries are dry like crops and privatization brings the rain."

The contract was awarded through international bidding, but City Water was the only company that submitted a bid.

== Impact ==
Water in Tanzania has become a costly commodity: while paying exorbitant water bills, many were forced to buy water from other private vendors at even higher rates. If customers failed to pay their water bills, Water Officers would disconnect water supply.

ActionAid UK claimed that water users in Dar es Salaam faced soaring bills and mass disconnections since 2003. It also said that City Water disconnected whole areas in an attempt to get people with illegal connections to pay up. They found that poor families turned to unsafe water supplies rather than pay the increased bills. "Donors have been pushing through a project in which 98% of the investment will go to the areas where the richest 20% of the population live," said Billy Abimbilla, director of ActionAid Tanzania. "Unprofitable areas" – where the poor reside – were given to non-governmental organisations and were not part of the area of the private responsibility. WaterAid, CARE and Plan International were to be subcontracted under World Bank funding to carry out water projects in low income areas which were unlikely to be served by the piped network for some time. This component of the World Bank project only accounted for $3-$4m, or roughly 2%, of the total project costs.

Tanzania's water minister, Edward Lowassa, said that no new pipes have been installed, the company has not spent the money it had promised, water quality has declined, and that revenue has decreased. According to Mussa Billegeya of the Tanzania Association of NGOs (TANGO) Biwater was doing almost none of what they were supposed to do. They didn’t pay the lease fee to the government. They owed around US$3.5 million to the government in 2005.

According to Cliff Stone, the British chief executive of City Water, the government breached the lease contract. He said that water quality and quantity had improved. He also claimed the Tanzanian government had given the company wrong data about water supplies and the delays were not of City Water's making. He also said the Tanzanian government owed the company US$3m. He acknowledged, however, that the project was well behind schedule and that no pipes had been installed. Biwater said it invested £7m in City Water.

== Legal aftermath ==
A London tribunal threw out a case brought by CWS under the rules of the United Nations Commission on International Trade Law (UNCITRAL). The tribunal, citing World Bank evidence, found that water and sewerage services had deteriorated under CWS's management. It awarded £3m in damages to DAWASA, the Tanzanian water utility, and half a million pounds in legal costs. It pointed to a World Bank study in 2005 which concluded: "The primary assumption on the part of almost all involved, certainly from the donor side, was that it would be hard if not impossible for the private sector operator to perform worse than DAWASA, but that is what happened." Since City Water is defunct and has no assets, the damages and legal costs have not been paid.

In a separate legal case the International Centre for the Settlement of Investment Disputes (ICSID) ruled that Tanzania's government had violated its bilateral investment treaty with the UK by expelling City Water on four separate counts: unlawful expropriation of assets, a failure to provide fair and equitable treatment, unreasonable and discriminatory conduct and a failure to provide full protection and security. However, it also threw out a £10m damages claim made by Biwater, saying that there were no damages to award as the company's value was "nil" at the time of expropriation. ICSID's ruling showed that while Biwater publicly denied culpability for City Water's poor performance at the time, its executives were aware of the company's shortcomings. "Our City Water staffing was totally with non-Biwater staff with a weak leader, no clear experience or qualified business plan," wrote Adrian White, a former BBC governor, who holds the majority stake in Biwater, early in 2005. Biwater reacted to the decision by saying that "the Tribunal's decision not to award damages or costs (to Biwater) has sent an extremely negative message to the international investment community."

== See also ==
Water supply and sanitation in Tanzania
