= Water supply and sanitation in Tanzania =

- The flag of Tanzania

Data
- Water coverage (broad definition): (improved water source) 52% (2007, household survey), 50% ('at least basic' definition,2017, JMP)
- Sanitation coverage (broad definition): (improved sanitation) 33% (2006, household survey), 24% ('at least basic' definition, 2017, JMP)
- Continuity of supply: Mostly intermittent (17 out of 20 urban areas)
- Average urban water use (L/person/day): not available
- Average urban water and sanitation tariff (US$/m^{3}): 0.34 (2008)
- Share of household metering: 60% (in 20 urban areas)
- Annual investment in WSS: US$175m (fiscal year 2008–09), or US$4/capita
- Share of self-financing by utilities: Low
- Share of tax-financing: Low
- Share of external financing: 88%

Institutions
- Decentralization to municipalities: Yes
- National water and sanitation company: No
- Water and sanitation regulator: Energy and Water Utilities Regulatory Authority (EWURA)
- Responsibility for policy setting: Ministry of Water and Irrigation (water supply), Ministry of Health and Social Welfare (sanitation)
- Sector law: Water Supply and Sanitation Act Nr. 12 of 2009
- No. of urban service providers: 20 Urban Water and Sanitation Authorities (UWSSAs) in cities, about 100 in towns
- No. of rural service providers: 8,394 water committees (2007)

Water supply and sanitation in Tanzania is characterised by decreasing access to at least basic water sources in the 2000s (especially in urban areas), steady access to some form of sanitation (around 93% since the 1990s), intermittent water supply and generally low quality of service. Many utilities are barely able to cover their operation and maintenance costs through revenues due to low tariffs and poor efficiency. There are significant regional differences and the best performing utilities are Arusha and Tanga.

The government of Tanzania has embarked on a major sector reform process since 2002 when an update was made to the National Water Policy NAWAPO. At that time, the central government reported that only 42% of rural households had access to improved water and that 30% of all water systems in the country were inoperative. An ambitious National Water Sector Development Strategy that promotes integrated water resources management and the development of urban and rural water supply was adopted in 2006. Decentralisation has meant that responsibility for water and sanitation service provision has shifted to local government authorities and is carried out by 20 urban utilities and about 100 district utilities, as well as by Community Owned Water Supply Organizations in rural areas.

These reforms have been backed by a significant increase of the budget starting in 2006, when the water sector was included among the priority sectors of the National Strategy for Growth and Reduction of Poverty MKUKUTA. The Tanzanian water sector remains heavily dependent on external donors: 88% of the available funds are provided by external donor organisations. Results have been mixed. For example, a report by GIZ notes that "despite heavy investments brought in by the World Bank and the European Union, (the utility serving Dar es Salaam) has remained one of the worst performing water entities in Tanzania."

== Access ==
Access to improved water sources and sanitation in Tanzania remains limited, particularly in rural areas, where infrastructure challenges and funding constraints continue to hinder progress.Determining data on access is particularly difficult because different definitions and sources are used, which results in significant discrepancies. In 2015, 50% of the population had access to "at least basic" water, 79% and 37% of urban and rural areas, respectively. In Tanzania, around 26 million people, in 2015, lacked access to "at least basic" water. Regarding sanitation around 40 million, in 2015, lacked access to "at least basic" sanitation. In Tanzania, in 2015, only 24% of the population had access to "at least basic" sanitation, 37% and 17% in urban and rural areas respectively.

According to a report, household surveys regularly return lower rural water supply coverage than estimates by the Ministry of Water and Irrigation (which are collected by district water engineers and urban water and sanitation authorities). For urban areas, survey data are consistently higher because they also include households that are not connected to the formal water supply network and access water from neighbours, protected wells or boreholes.

Water supply. Slightly more than half the population of Tanzania is estimated to have access to an improved water source, with stark differences between urban areas (about 79% in 2010) and rural areas (about 44% in 2010). In rural areas, access is defined as meaning that households have to travel less than one kilometre to a protected drinking water source in the dry season. Trends in access to water supply are difficult to discern due to conflicting and unreliable data. However, it seems that access increased during the 1990s, particularly in rural areas, but stagnated during the 2000s. According to data from the Household Budget Surveys 2000/2001 and 2007 access to an improved water source in mainland Tanzania even decreased from 55% in 2000 to 52% in 2007. Using a narrow definition, in 2007 around 34% of households had access to piped water, as opposed to 40% in 2000. However, using a broader definition of access that also includes standpipes and protected springs, there has been a slight increase in the proportion of households reporting a drinking water source within one kilometre. Estimates from the Joint Monitoring Programme for Water Supply and Sanitation (JMP) show a different trend. They show a slight decline in access from 55% in 1990 to 53% in 2010. According to these figures, access in rural areas stagnated, while in urban areas it decreased from 94% to 79% over the same period. The JMP estimates rely on extrapolations using, among others, data from the Household Budget Survey 2000/2001 and 2007, the Census of 2002 and the Demographic and Health Surveys of 1999, 2005 and 2010.

Sanitation. National Household Budget Surveys ask respondents about the type of sanitary facility they have. In 2007 93% of Tanzanians responded that they had some form of latrine, but only 3% had a flush toilet. International statistics that monitor the achievement of the Millennium Development Goal for sanitation are based on these numbers, but only after making some important adjustments in an effort to achieve comparability across countries. The Joint Monitoring Programme for Water Supply and Sanitation (JMP) defines improved sanitation as excreta disposal systems that are private and that separate human excreta from human contact. Shared latrines or open pit latrines are excluded from this definition. The JMP estimates that only about half the latrines in Tanzania can be considered improved sanitation systems. Based on that definition, access to improved sanitation is much lower than the population with access to any type of latrine. According to the JMP definition, access to improved sanitation was only 10% in 2010, up from 8% in 1990, with an increase in urban areas and a slight decrease in rural areas.

Access to Water and Sanitation in Tanzania (2007)
		Dar es Salaam (6% of population)	Other urban areas (19% of population)	Rural (75% of population)	Total
Water	Broad definition	85%	76%	40%	52%
Water	House connections	8%	13%	1%	4%
Sanitation	All forms, including latrines	97%	97%	90%	93%
Sanitation	Flush Toilets	10%	6%	1%	3%

== Service quality ==
=== Continuity of supply ===
Of the twenty Urban Water Supply and Sanitation Authorities (UWSSAs) that operate in Tanzania, three are able to provide continuous water supply (Arusha, Songea and Tanga). In eleven other cities water is supplied for at least 19 hours. In Babati and Mtwara there is water supply for 12 hours per day. The lowest figures (5 hours per day) come from the cities of Kigoma, Lindi and Singida. In Dar es Salaam water is supplied on average for 9 hours per day.

=== Water quality ===
Water quality varies significantly within the country. In the semi-arid regions (including Dodoma, Singida, Tabora, Shinyanga, and Arusha), colour and turbidity levels become problematic during the rainy season. Rivers in the fluoride belt (including Arusha, Kilimanjaro, Singida, and Shinyanga regions of the Rift Valley, and extending to the Pangani and Internal Drainage basins) have naturally high fluoride concentrations. The waters of Lakes Tanganyika and Nyasa have overall good water quality except in the vicinity of urban areas where effluent and storm water cause local contamination, whereas the water quality of Lake Victoria is poor: high turbidity and nutrient levels lead to frequent blooms of algae and infestations of water weeds.

Controls of the quality of drinking water fall under the responsibility of local service providers at the point of water production. They refer to Water Quality Standards established for urban and rural areas in the 1970s.

A water pollution incident occurred at the Barrick Gold North Mara Mine in May 2009, when acidic water (pH 4.8) seeped from a mine rock storage facility into the Tigithe River, which is used for irrigation, bathing and as an unprotected source of drinking water.

=== Wastewater treatment ===
Of the twenty major urban water utilities, 11 provide some access to sewer connections. In Moshi the reported connection rate is 45% (although this also includes some industrial connections), in Morogoro the reported rate is 15% and in Dodoma and Iringa it is 13%. In Dar es Salaam the length of the sewer network is estimated at 188 km, although only 4% of households have access to it.

According to an article by a group of researchers from the Waste Stabilisation Ponds and Constructed Wetlands (WSP & CW) Research Group at the University of Dar es Salaam, stabilization ponds have been the most common technology for wastewater treatment in Tanzania. Waste stabilisation ponds have been introduced since the late 1960s, due to the favourable tropical climate and the availability of natural wetlands. At that time, twenty wastewater pond systems were recorded as existing, five of them were used to treat textile, paper mill, tannery and other industrial wastewater. However, many waste stabilisation ponds systems are ineffective because of poor operation and maintenance, design and configuration mistakes and the mixing of municipal and industrial wastes. Starting in 1998, constructed wetlands were introduced in Tanzania. Ten units have been built for residential houses and institutions such as schools, prisons and colleges. They serve about 12,000 people.

In addition, wastewater treatment plants are reported to operate in the municipalities of Morogoro, Dodoma, Iringa, Arusha and Songea and in the cities of Dar es Salaam and Mwanza. Wastewater samples are collected from these wastewater treatment plants. The result of the analysis of 250 samples showed that national standards for effluent prior to discharge were met in 88% of cases.

== Water resources ==
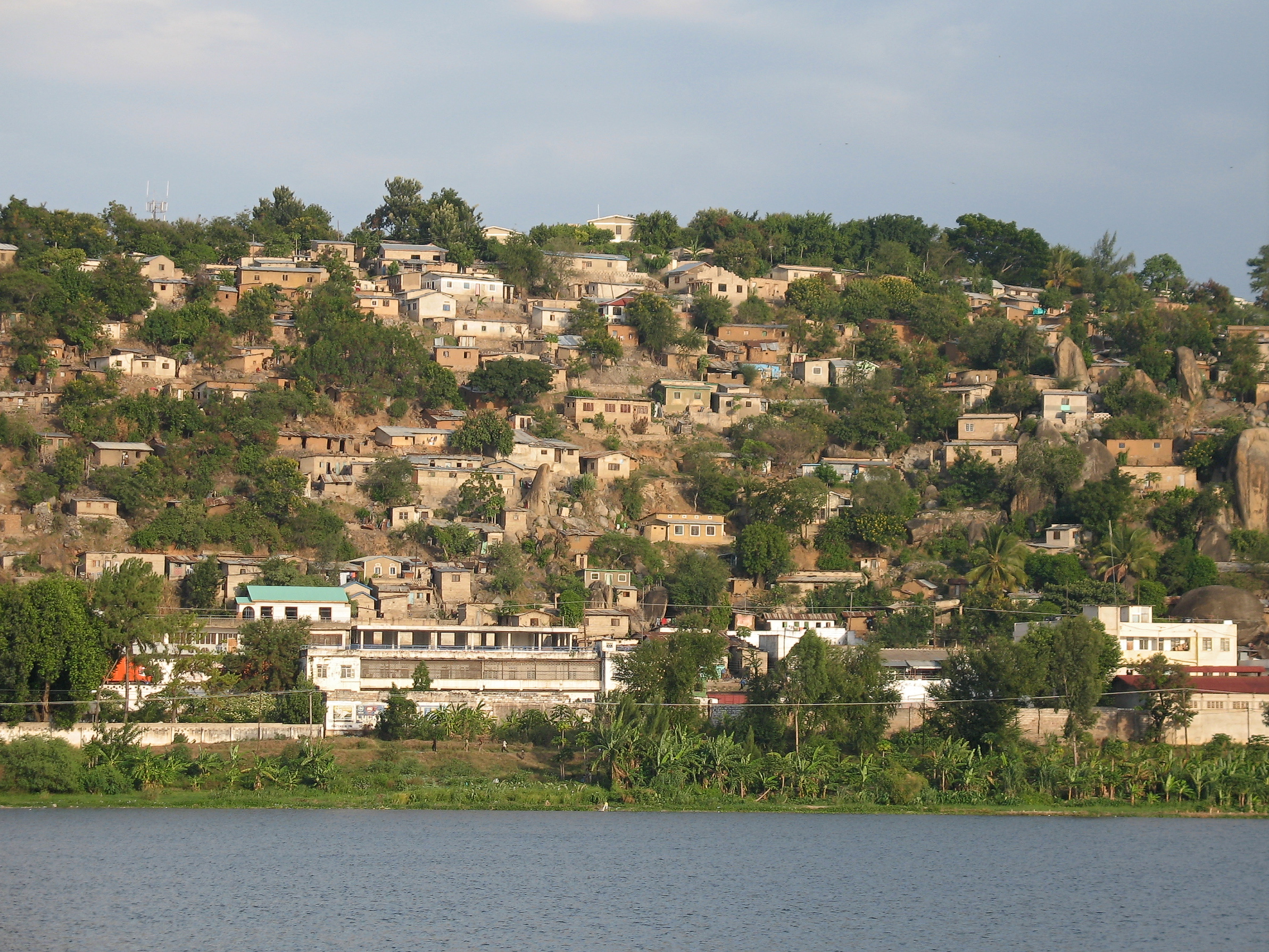
Mwanza, Tanzania's second largest city, receives its water from Lake Victoria.

As a whole and on average, Tanzania has extensive water resources. According to the Food and Agriculture Organization (FAO), in 2008 Tanzania had 96.27 km^{3} of renewable water resources per year (by comparison, estimated world water resources are in the order of 43,750 km^{3}/year). This corresponds to 2,266 m^{3} per person and year. Water resources are however distributed unevenly—both in time and space. During the dry season, which usually lasts from June to October, even large rivers can dry up or their flow declines substantially. Some parts of the country receive, on average, up to 3,000 mm (120 in) of rain per year, while in other regions (such as the Dodoma Region or the Rift Valley) yearly rainfall averages 600 mm (24 in).

Projections indicate that by 2025 Tanzania will experience water stress (defined as average per capita water resources below 1,500 m^{3}) due to population growth and the resulting increase in consumption.

As of 2002, water use for municipal water supply in mainland Tanzania was about 493 million m^{3}/year, or 0.5% of total renewable water resources.

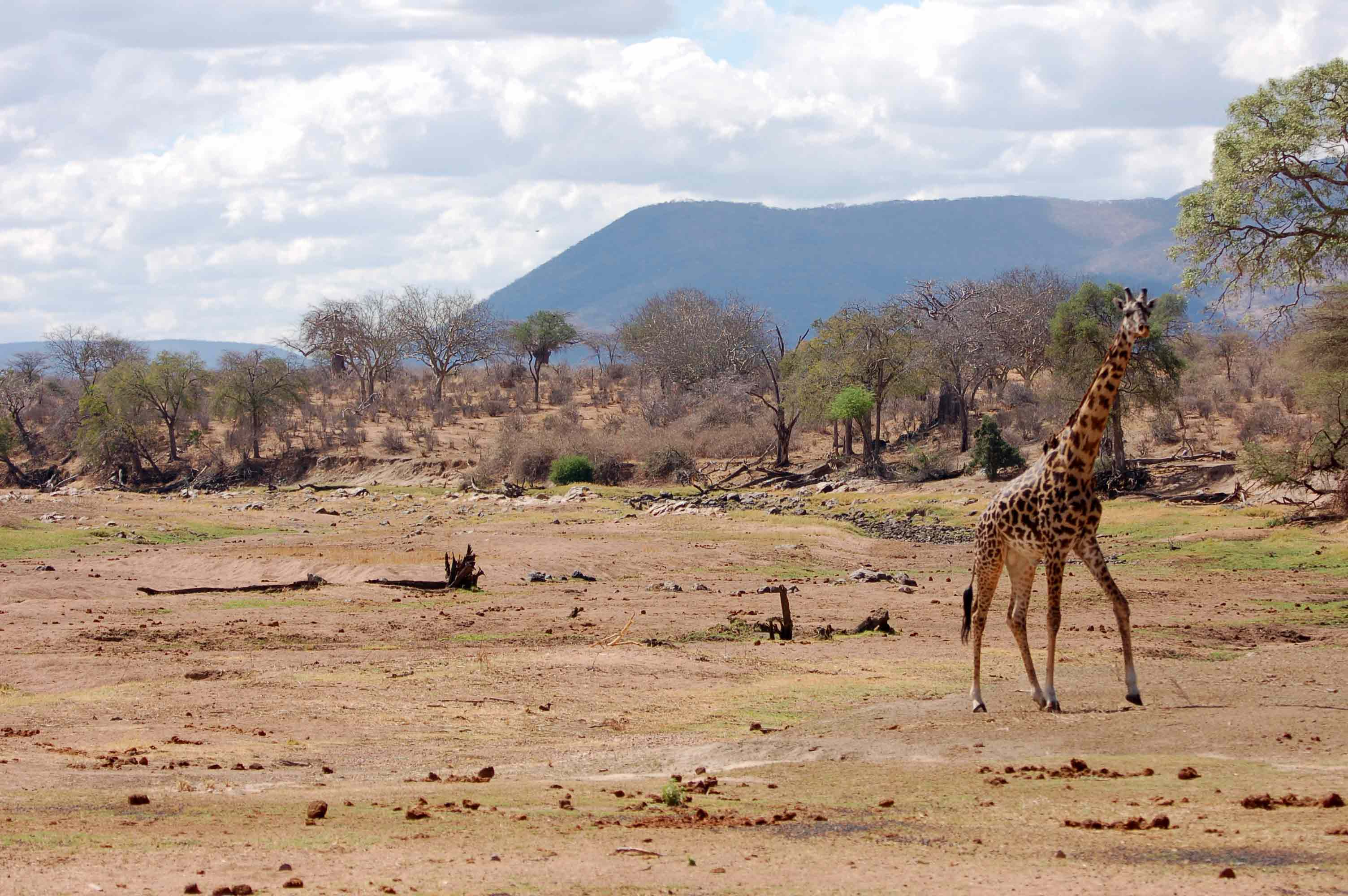
The dry Great Ruaha River in 2006 illustrates the scarcity of water during the dry season in parts of Tanzania.

Lakes alone cover about 7% of Tanzania's land surface. On the borders there are three African Great Lakes: Lake Victoria, Lake Tanganyika and Lake Nyasa; inland lakes include Lake Rukwa, Lake Eyasi and Lake Manyara. There are nine major drainage basins in Tanzania, divided according to the recipient water body. The Lake Victoria basin drains to the Mediterranean Sea (through the Nile River basin). Draining to the Indian Ocean there are the Pangani River Basin, the Ruvu/Wami River basin, the Rufiji River basin, the Ruvuma River and Southern Coast basin, the Lake Nyasa basin. The Lake Tanganyika basin drains to the Atlantic Ocean through the Congo River basin. The Internal Drainage basin and the Lake Rukwa basin belong to the Rift Valley (endorheic) basin.

Tanzania has been divided into nine administrative units corresponding to the nine major river or lake basins. Basin Water Offices (BWOs) are responsible for regulating and planning the use of water resources, based on the Water Resources Management Act Nr. 11 of 2009. The water resource management section of the Water Sector Development Programme requires that their activities be carried out in line with the principles of Integrated Water Resources Management. It has however been noted that BWOs suffer from severe institutional weaknesses: they often lack necessary information, clear development plans to guide investments and support monitoring and are largely characterised by weak human capacity.

== History ==
The history of water supply and sanitation in Tanzania is a byproduct of colonization that has shaped water inaccessibility, beginning with German and British administrative practices. From 1889 to 1914 in German East Africa, wells, sewage, and drains were constructed for the sole use of German settlers who lived in compounds in the eastern regions of Tanzania. Sanitation services existed for a low fee within zones, created along racial lines, for German and Indian settlers. At the same time, Tanzanians in the western region lacked access to drains and sewage systems and were also denied waste collection; they lived in poor living conditions and had inadequate sanitation facilities, such as pit latrines accompanied by boreholes.

From 1918 to 1961, the British seized control of German East Africa and renamed it Tanganyika. There were no improvements in safe water access for Tanzanians even with British rule. Like the German Ordinances, the British also charged excessive fees for safe water in Dar es Salaam. However, British settlers built sewage and drains in their residential area starting in the 1930s as they continued to control water and sanitation access based on race, economic, and residential zoning. Spatial designs by Europeans were devised in townships that were cleared of mosquitos and segregated into three zones: British, Indians, and Native Tanzanians. Besides, Tanzanians could not afford plots, and many lived in cramped and overcrowded spaces, resulting in the spread of waterborne illnesses caused by using pit latrines and open spaces, due to a lack of clean water access.

Those who lived in unplanned settlements had no access to water or sanitation systems until the 1950s. Rural areas continued to self-supply water, creating more boreholes and using pit latrines. These areas did not express public civic engagement around the lack of water infrastructure.

In the 1950s the few settlements with piped water supply charged for water sold at water kiosks or through residential connections. In rural areas systems were operated and maintained by cooperatives, such as the Makonde Water Development Cooperation in the Mtwara Region of Southern Tanzania. One of the promises of the independence movement at that time was to provide water for free, a promise that was kept when Tanganyika gained independence in 1961.

=== Top-down projects and free rural water supply (1964–1991) ===
After the union of the former British colonies Tanganyika and Zanzibar to form the United Republic of Tanzania in 1964, then President Julius Nyerere implemented a policy of African socialism called Ujamaa. This included the forced resettlement of dispersed rural smallholders to collective farms. One of the stated objectives of the resettlement was to facilitate the provision of education, health services as well as water supply. In the spirit of the Ujamaa the government launched a 20-year Rural Water Supply Programme (RWSP) in 1971 with the aim of providing access to adequate and safe water supply within a walking distance of 400 meters from each household by the year 1991. Under this programme, water was provided free of charge in rural areas, while moderate tariffs were charged for house connections in urban areas. Implementation was highly centralized: In 1972 the central government abolished local government authorities that were replaced by central government representatives in committees at the district and village level under a policy that was ironically labelled "decentralization".

According to a report by WaterAid, "the resulting water projects were unsustainable and left a legacy of distrust among villagers for government programmes". Villages were selected based on purely technical criteria by the district water department without consultation with communities. Deep boreholes were drilled and equipped with pumps and diesel engines that should have been maintained by the government using central funds. This did not work well and many of the pumps were inoperable. In other communities, mismanagement of government provided funds and a desire to implement as many water systems as possible led to the initial construction of projects that never reached completion. In subsequent years public services collapsed and a serious outbreak of cholera occurred in many urban areas between 1976 and 1980. In response to this failure Town and Municipal Councils were re-established in 1978, but remained without any revenue of their own and depended completely on central government funding. Public service provision remained poor. Although politicians and donors had recognized by that time that the policy of free rural water supply and centralized management had failed, it took them more than two decades from its inception to change that policy. A mid-term review of the RWSP conducted in 1985 showed that only 46% of the rural population had access to water supply services. Among the reasons were the lack of involvement by beneficiaries, the use of inappropriate technologies, insufficient financial resources, poor operations and maintenance procedures, and an inadequate, overly centralized institutional framework.

=== Community participation and management (1991–present) ===
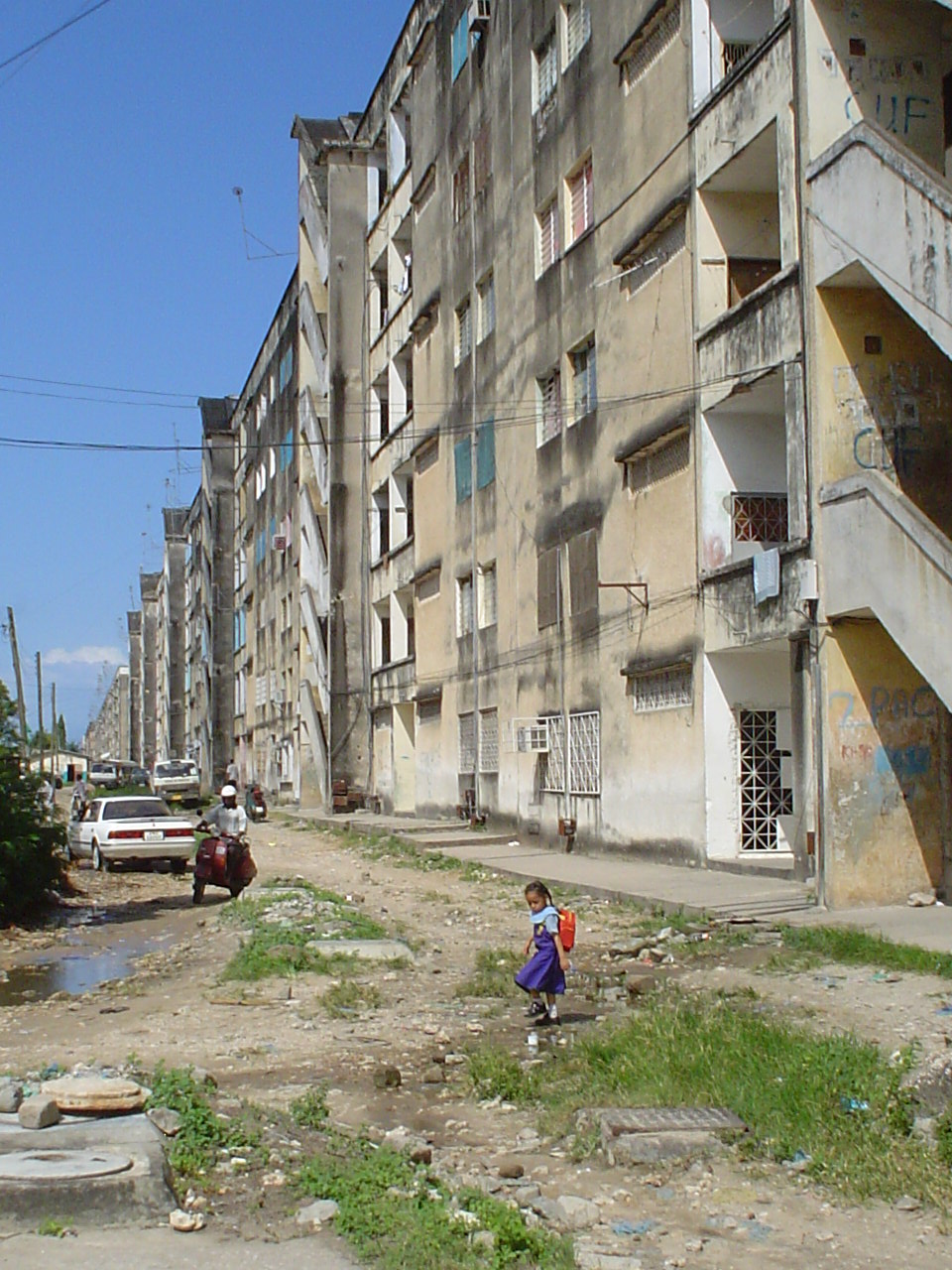
The Michenzani apartment building near Stone Town on Zanzibar island, once the pride of East German development cooperation, illustrates the challenges to properly maintain infrastructure and leverage the current infrastructure to pave way for new and green field projects (see open manholes in the foreground).

The socialist policy of Ujamaa was gradually phased out when Nyerere handed power over to Ali Hassan Mwinyi, first as president in 1985 and then as head of the ruling party in 1990. The government initiated political and administrative reforms, as part of which the first National Water Policy was approved in 1991. At the core of the reforms was the Local Government Reform Programme aimed at decentralising power by devolving resources and responsibility for service delivery to district and municipal councils, including transfers of conditional and unconditional block grants to the councils. The National Water Policy emphasized community participation in the selection of projects and in operating and maintaining them through water committees that charged for water. Villagers also had to make a cash contributions towards capital costs and contributed time and labour, local materials and hospitality for visiting government staff. They also undertook hygiene education and serve on health committees.

A pilot for the new policy was initiated by WaterAid in Dodoma Urban District together with the district government. An innovative feature of the project was that the water department worked closely with the community development department and the health department. Both had previously not been involved in water projects. Using the acronyms of the three departments and of WaterAid the integrated team was called WAMMA, giving the project its name. Each of the three departmental teams had to have both men and women among its staff, although this was difficult to implement because of a shortage of female staff. Unlike before, communities were selected based on a needs survey. However, government staff at all levels were poorly paid and had little interesting work to do. Some were consequently demotivated. Like many other externally funded projects, the WAMMA project paid allowances to fieldworkers for work undertaken outside their offices in order to motivate them. However, "payments were made at the official rate, as any higher allowances would undermine the government’s capacity to sustain or replicate work without donor inputs." WaterAid initially worked directly at the district level without any formal agreement with the regional government until 1995. The programme, which was considered a success by WaterAid and the district government, was subsequently extended from Dodoma Urban District to three other districts in Dodoma Region. 86 projects were built under between 1991 and 1996. The innovative collaborative work between three district departments and the participatory approach attracted visitors from all over Tanzania.

A Water Sector Review conducted in 1993 revealed that the problems in the water sector identified in 1985 persisted at the national level and suggested further reforms. To implement these reforms in urban areas, the Waterworks Act, Cap 272 was introduced in 1993. Its aim was to regulate the supply of water through urban public authorities.

In 1996 new guidelines for the National Water Policy were released, which were inspired by guidelines developed under the WAMMA program. Concerning rural areas they state that villages are responsible for all operation and maintenance costs and that cost sharing is expected for capital costs. Since 1997, 19 Urban Water Supply and Sanitation Authorities (UWSSAs) have operated services in larger urban centres under a Memorandum of Understanding (MoU) with the Ministry of Water, which contains performance indicators to be reported to the Ministry.

=== Short-lived privatization in Dar es Salaam (2003–2005) ===
Following World Bank conditionalities that the government privatize water services in exchange for aid, in August 2003, City Water Services Ltd., a British-German consortium, was awarded a ten-year lease contract to manage the water supply infrastructure of Dar es Salaam. City Water took over responsibility for operating the water system, billing, tariff collection and routine maintenance, while DAWASA remained in charge of rehabilitating and expanding the water network. The contract was terminated two years later for breach of contract and poor performance.

== Responsibility for water supply and sanitation ==
Water and sanitation policies and strategies are defined by Ministries at the national level; economic regulation of services provision is undertaken by a national authority and environmental regulation by a National Council; service provision is the responsibility of various local entities.

=== Policy and regulation ===
==== Legal framework ====
The legal framework for water supply and sanitation is based on the Water Supply and Sanitation Act Nr. 12 enacted in May 2009. The Act outlines the responsibilities of government authorities involved in the water sector, establishes Water Supply and Sanitation Authorities as commercial entities and allows for their clustering where this leads to improved commercial viability. It also provides for the registration and operation of Community Owned Water Supply Organisations and regulates the appointment of board members.

==== Responsibilities of institutions at the national level ====
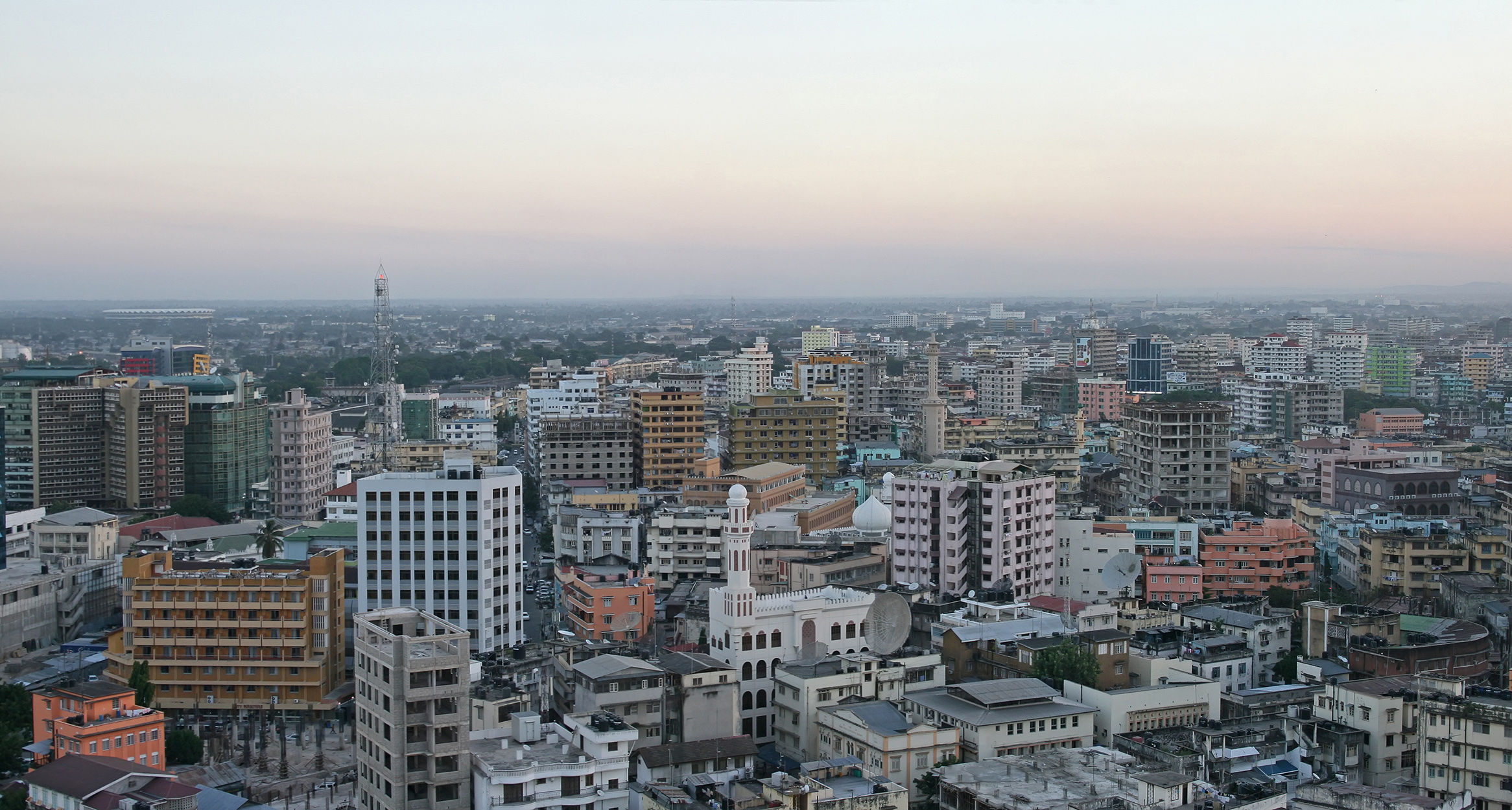
The former capital Dar es Salaam is the seat of the Ministry of Water and Irrigation and other Ministries with responsibilities in the sector.

Ministries. The Ministry of Water and Irrigation (MoWI) is the agency responsible for overall WSDP policy setting, co-ordination, monitoring, evaluation and regulating community water supplies. The promotion of hygiene and sanitation is in the hands of the Ministry of Health and Social Welfare. Decentralisation in the Tanzanian water and sanitation sector has transferred responsibilities for service provision to Local Government Authorities (LGAs). LGAs comprise 132 municipal, district and town councils: they are responsible for the procurement, financing, management and monitoring of service providers in their administrative area. In this, they are advised by the Prime Minister's Office - Regional Administration and Local Government (PMO-RALG). PMO-RALG plays a key co-ordination role in planning and capacity building for local authorities. It is also responsible for allocating resources for service delivery. The Regional Secretariat provides technical support to LGAs and monitors their activity.

Other ministries play an active role in the water and sanitation sector. The Ministry of Finance and Economic Affairs (MoFEA) oversees intra-government funding and is responsible for the overall planning and budgeting, including the water and sanitation sector. The Ministry of Education and Vocational Training is responsible for hygiene education and the provision of sanitation in schools. Sector ministries are responsible for the use of water resources for irrigation, industrial use and energy generation.

Cooperation between Ministries. In 2009, the Ministry of Health and Social Welfare, MoWI, the Ministry of Education and Vocational Training and PMO-RALG signed a Memorandum of Understanding for the integrated implementation of sanitation and hygiene activities. The aim of the MoU was to facilitate their cooperation and co-ordination in carrying out their responsibilities related to sanitation and hygiene. Co-operation will occur through the National Sanitation and Hygiene Steering and Technical Committees.

Economic regulation. Commercial water service providers are regulated by the Energy and Water Utilities Regulatory Authority (EWURA) established in 2001 by the Energy and Water Utilities Regulatory Authority Act, Cap 414. EWURA is responsible for licensing, tariff review and approval, performance monitoring and standards. It started operating in the water sector in 2006.

Environmental regulation. Screening of possible environmental impacts on proposed project sites is carried out by the National Environment Management Council (NEMC) as part of the Environmental and Social Management Framework. NEMC is responsible for setting standards and issuing permits for the discharge of effluents into the environment, including into water resources.

==== Policies and strategies ====
The National Water Sector Development Strategy (NWSDS) 2006–2015 sets out a strategy for implementing the National Water Policy NAWAPO of 2002. NAWAPO aims to achieve sustainable development in the sector through an "efficient use of water resources and efforts to increase the availability of water and sanitation services." It is guided by the principles of decentralisation and localisation of management and services.

The National Rural Water Supply and Sanitation Program (NRWSSP) 2006–2025 aims to provide a policy framework for provision of equitable and sustainable water access to 65% of the rural population by 2010, 74% by 2015, and 90% by 2025. The NRWSSP is the second iteration of the Rural Water Supply and Sanitation Project (RWSSP) that was piloted in 2002. The program is run by the Ministry of Water and includes goals for institutional reorganization as well as a focus on data collection and monitoring through a Management Information System. As of 2008, challenges related to insufficient capital, bureaucratic delay, and lack of local oversight have resulted in minimal progress.

The National Water Sector Development Programme (WSDP) of 2006–2025 is centred on commercial service provision including private sector participation in urban areas and community ownership and management in rural areas. It also sets out to implement "demand driven approaches". Its first phase was supposed to last until 2012, but was extended. The programme "promotes the integration of water supply and sanitation with hygiene education." The WSDP has four components:

- Water resources management;
- Institutional development and capacity building;
- Rural water supply and sanitation—as part of this component comprehensive district water supply and sanitation plans are to be developed;
- Urban water supply and sanitation—which aims at the execution of utility business plans in regional and district capitals, as well as at the implementation of national and small towns water schemes.

Water and sanitation policies in Tanzania are developed in line with Development Vision 2025 and the National Strategy for Growth and Reduction of Poverty, better known under its Swahili name MKUKUTA (Mkakati wa Kukuza Uchumi na Kupunguza Umasikini Tanzania). Universal access to safe water is one of the objectives of Vision 2025, to be realised "through the involvement of the private sector and the empowerment of local government." The importance of water supply and adequate sanitation is recognised in the second cluster of MKUKUTA ("Improvement of quality of life and social well being"). Here, one of the primary goals is to achieve "increased access to clean, affordable and safe water, sanitation, decent shelter, and a safe and sustainable environment."

=== Service provision ===
==== Urban areas ====
In Dar es Salaam and two districts of Pwani Region the responsibility for water supply and sanitation is split between an asset holding company that is responsible for capital investments (the Dar es Salaam Water and Sewerage Authority - DAWASA - with a staff of about 60) and an operating company that runs the water and sewer system on a daily basis and bills the customers (the Dar es Salaam Water and Sewerage Corporation - DAWASCO - with a staff of about 1,500). DAWASCO operates under a 10-year lease contract with DAWASA that is almost identical to the lease contract that DAWASA had signed with a foreign private company in 2003 as part of a failed privatization attempt. The institutional separation between asset ownership and operation thus is a legacy of the privatization attempt. In Dar es Salaam, insufficient piped water supplies, especially in poor squatter settlements and neighborhoods, has forced residents to resort to complementary water systems to meet their daily needs. These include illegal connections, illegal pumping, and purchasing water from pushcart vendors that resale at 15–25 times the official price. It is estimated that 29% of water supplied in the city is from illegal connections and that only 30% of residents have a legal connection to the utility distribution line.

In other cities, the operation, maintenance and development of water and sewerage infrastructure is carried out by Urban Water and Sanitation Authorities (UWSSAs). UWSSAs are autonomous legal entities that are meant to operate on the basis of commercial principles. They have been established in 19 major urban cities in accordance with the Waterworks Act No. 8 of 1997. The 19 UWSSAs are divided in three categories from A to C in declining order of cost recovery (see below for more details). As of 2010 they were classified in the following categories:

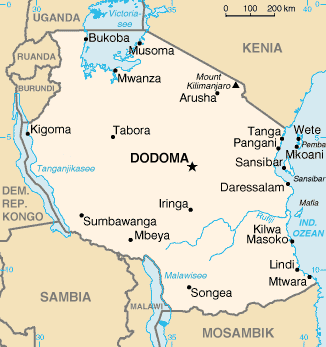
Map of Tanzania

Category A (13 utilities):

- Arusha,
- Iringa,
- Shinyanga,
- Songea,
- Mbeya,
- Morogoro,
- Moshi,
- Mwanza,
- Musoma,
- Tabora,
- Tanga,
- Dodoma, and
- Mtwara.

Category B (4 utilities):

- Bukoba,
- Kigoma,
- Sumbawanga, and
- Singida.

Category C:

- Babati, and
- Lindi.

In districts and small towns there are about one hundred small public service providers, the District Urban Water Supply and Sanitation Authorities (DUWSSAs). In 2007, MoWI initiated a process of clustering them with the aim to increase the quality and efficiency of service. However, as of 2012 clustering had made little process because it runs counter to the ongoing overall decentralization process. Donor agencies such as GIZ have thus stopped their support for clustering.

Urban and district water utilities are not responsible for on-site sanitation, which remains in the hands of the relevant local council.

==== Rural areas ====
Overview. In rural areas, water supply and sanitation services are provided by Community Owned Water Supply Organisations (COWSOs). They have been established through the local government framework of village councils following the adoption of the Water Sector Development Strategy. Out of 10,639 villages, 8,394 had a Water Committee dealing with issues in the water and sanitation sector as of 2007. The role of COWSOs is to operate and maintain the water supply systems on behalf of the community. They are expected to meet all the costs of operating and maintaining their water supply systems through charges levied on water consumers, and to contribute to the capital cost of their systems. However, inadequate technical training of community associations in operations and maintenance has resulted in misuse and disrepair of rural water systems, with 40% of rural water schemes experiencing persistent non-functionality. The main source of capital investment are block grants to local government authorities, disbursed by the Regional Secretariat. There are two main types of COWSOs: Water Consumer Associations (Vikundi vya Huduma ya Maji), who are responsible for drinking water supply, and Water User Associations (Vikundi vya Watumiaji Maji), who are responsible for water resources and for solving conflicts among water users. As of 2006, 121 Water User Associations have been established. Formally, Water User Associations require payment of membership fees, participation in meetings, development of constitutions and by-laws, and election processes for leadership positions. However, consistent member participation remains low as villagers opt instead for participation in informal associations that have fewer requirements.

Example:Hai district. In the Hai District in the Kilimanjaro Region 200,000 people in 55 villages are served by gravity systems from sources in the rainforest on the slopes of Mount Kilimandjaro. Until the early 1990s the water systems were in bad shape: Local communities did not maintain the infrastructure, water quality was poor and some systems even failed to provide any water. The national water policies of 1991 and 2002, which emphasized local participation and ownership as well as payment for water and metering, turned the situation around. Together with investments financed as part of development cooperation with Germany the new approach achieved substantial improvements. It benefited from a strong local tradition of self-help. Water systems are now operated and maintained by employees of water supply trusts—the local name for a COWSO. Each trust has ten members, half of which have to by women by law, who are elected by the communities. They set tariffs, manage their own budgets and hire managers for each water system. The managers in turn supervise technicians and accountants employed by the water committee. Water is sold at public taps by tap agents or provided to metered house connections. An evaluation in 2002 showed that the incidence of waterborne diseases had declined substantially compared to the early 1990s and that costs were more than fully recovered. As of 2009, water supply remained continuous and water quality good. The water committees remained financially sustainable with more than 90% of the customers paying their water bills.

Interface Between Formal and Informal Institutions. In rural areas that lack formal water systems or water management, traditional forms of water resource management and sanitation practices are passed down generationally as traditional ecological knowledge. Here, distrust between the government and indigenous groups stemming from the failed Free Water policy results in a lack of compliance with formal regulations. For example, water conflicts at the village level are often resolved informally, rather than being brought to primary and district courts that they find time-consuming, expensive, and unjust. Instead, informal water management practices are carried out at a grassroots level by traditional village elites, such as the mwanamijie in Sonjo villages. Rules including when and where water can be collected as well as punishments or fines when these rules are broken are closely connected to local religious beliefs, customs, and cultural values. Formal institutions that lack the technical skill and capital to build and maintain water systems in indigenous communities can take advantage of informal systems to lighten their responsibility, but the central government often fails to recognize these systems as legitimate.

Formal institutions and international aid agencies also place high emphasis on provisioning of potable water, ignoring other water needs faced by rural communities, including water supplies necessary for irrigation, livestock, and washing. When treated water is only made available in sufficient quantities for consumption, residents continue using traditional, contaminated sources for all other activities resulting in persistence of enteric diseases and conflict over water availability. Participation of community stakeholders in the process of rural water system development can prevent underemphasis of these needs.

=== Civil society ===
Civil society actors also participate in the water and sanitation sector. In 2008 they have set up TaWaSaNet, a network that aims at strengthening civil society participation in the water and sanitation and securing that policies are carried out in an equitable way. Among the NGOs active in the Tanzanian water sector (and mentioned in a report by MoWI) are: WaterAid, The Netherlands Development Organisation (SNV);Concern Worldwide, Plan International, WWF, Shahidi wa Maji, Daraja, and MSABI.

== Investment planning and decision-making ==
Water investment planning for rural areas is done at the district level by the respective water departments. In 2009 the NGO WaterAid studied the local government planning process for water investments in four of the country's 99 rural districts, namely in Mpwapwa, Kongwa, Iramba and Nzega. Planning begins with long wish-lists based on demands from the village level. Since real priorities are difficult to identify, one selection criterion used is the balance of money held in the village water fund. This is seen as a sign of community ownership and can be easily explained to councillors and villagers. Other purported criteria are health statistics and data collected from a waterpoint mapping exercise, but they are not given high priority in practice. Selection is done in such a way that water projects are equally divided between the constituencies of the district's Members of Parliament. Furthermore, councilors steer projects to villages in their wards, with more dynamic councillors exerting greater influence. Another de facto criterion is the previous track record in caring for infrastructure: In some areas handpumps have been stolen, making it hard to justify new investments. Communities close to town, located on main roads or with existing social services have an advantage in the decision-making process, since officials visit them more often and the cost of providing infrastructure is lower. The WaterAid report suggests that if there was better availability of data on rural water supply infrastructure this could help the representatives of underserved communities to lobby on behalf of their constituents.

== Public opinion ==
The Afrobarometer Survey 2008 collected information about Tanzanians' opinions about the water sector. The disparity in access to safe and clean water between rural and urban areas is illustrated by the responses: 51% of urban residents were satisfied with government efforts to deliver water and sanitation services, compared to 39% in rural areas. Accordingly, the water sector is considered as a higher priority for government action by rural Tanzanians. 44% of respondents in rural areas cited water supply as one of the three most pressing issues that the government should address (for 16% it is the single most important problem). In urban areas water supply came third behind economic and health concerns in 25% of responses. Issues of corruption in the water sector were also examined by the Survey: 4% of respondents admitted that they had to pay a bribe, give a gift, or do a favor to government officials in order to get water or sanitation services in the past year.

== Economic efficiency ==
Some common indicators of the economic efficiency of water and sewerage utilities are billing efficiency, the level of non-revenue water and labour productivity. On the basis of these indicators the economic efficiency of urban service provision in the water sector in Tanzania is low.

Billing efficiency. Government data indicated that urban water utilities have relatively high levels of billing efficiency (never below 70%). However, a Public Expenditure Review in 2009 reported that 15% of the revenues of the 20 largest utilities regulated by EWURA is not collected.

Non-revenue water. The average level of non-revenue water among the 20 regional water utilities was 45% in fiscal year 2006–2007. Data reported by the Ministry of Water and Irrigation in 2009 show that non-revenue water in urban areas varies between 55% in Dar es Salaam and 25% in Tanga. It is estimated that non-revenue water is higher in small and district towns.

Labour productivity. On average, there were 10 staff members per 1000 water connections in the large water utilities as of 2007. The lowest number in Tanzanian UWSSAs is 6 employees per 1000 connections, obtained in Tanga, Mbeya and Arusha. This is close to the average for Sub-Saharan Africa which is 5 employees.

== Financial aspects ==
=== Tariffs and cost recovery ===
The national water policy NAWAPO identifies utilities as commercial entities that provide an economic and social good. It thus promotes operational and maintenance (O&M) cost recovery as basis for sustainable services. Rural Water and Sanitation Authorities are expected to meet full O&M costs and 5% of capital costs. Urban Water and Sanitation Authorities are divided in three categories according to their performance in cost recovery:

- category A: authorities that cover all O&M costs, including staff wages, energy costs and some contributions to investment;
- category B: authorities that meet O&M costs, share energy costs with the government and are able to pay full salaries to permanent employees;
- category C: authorities that require government support to meet their energy costs and to pay out salaries to permanent employees.

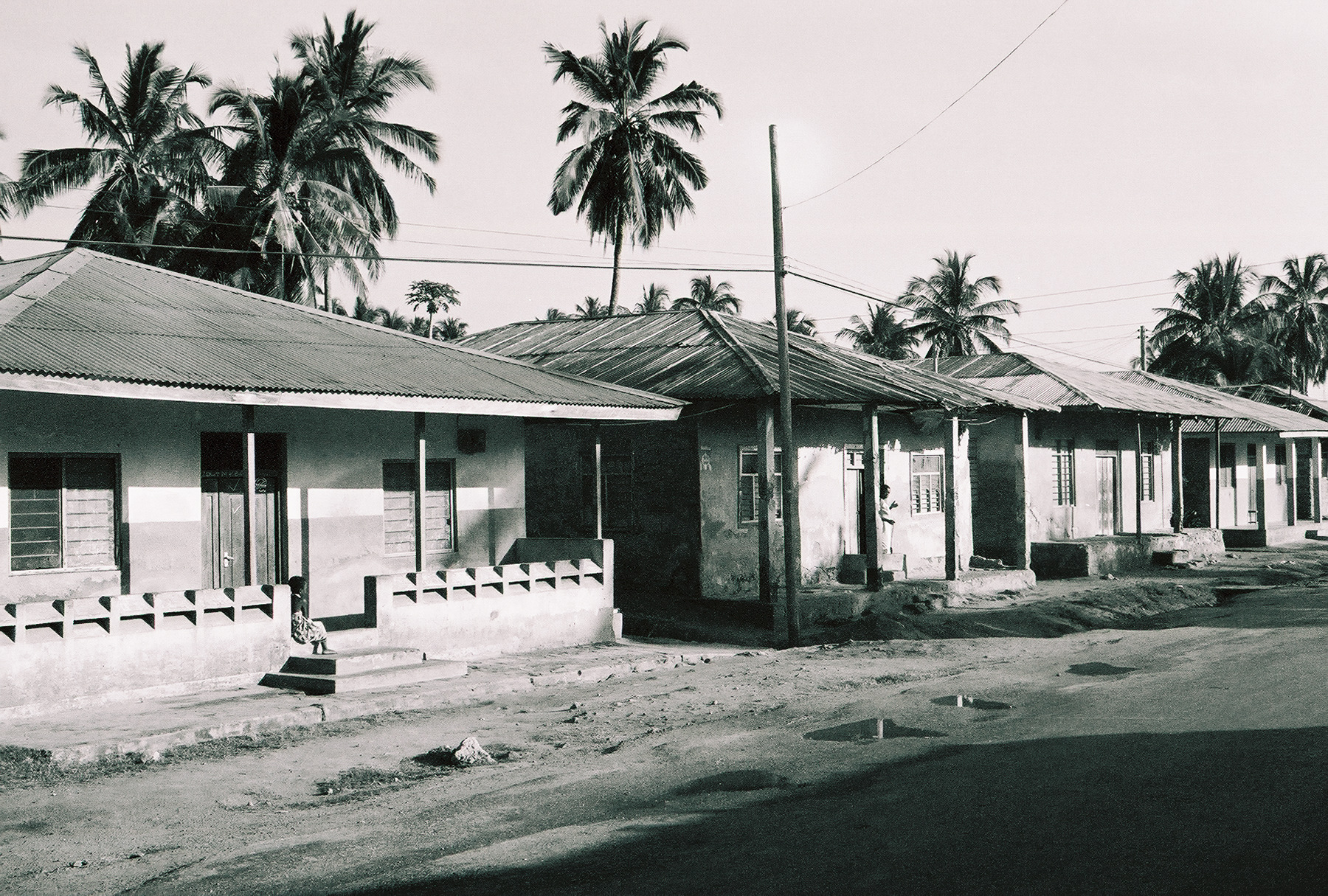
Lindi is one of two cities in Tanzania where the water utility does not collect enough revenue to meet energy costs and to pay salaries, despite having the highest water tariffs in the country.

This system was designed to act as an incentive for utilities to improve their performance. According to MoWI, 14 out of the 20 regional UWSSAs fall into category A, 4 are classified as B while utilities in Babati and Lindi are in category C. The results of a study by Tobias A. Swai of the University of Dar es Salaam, however, indicated that Category A UWSSAs are the least efficient although they are self-sustaining. EWURA data also point out that two out of the twenty regional utilities have an operating cost coverage ratio significantly higher than one, which means that they can sustain the current service level. Seven other utilities only just manage to keep their current operations running.

Tariff levels are set at the local level, but need to be approved by the national-level regulatory agency EWURA. In urban areas, UWSSAs determine tariffs according to their funding requirements and the category in which they operate. In water supply schemes run by Local Government Authorities, tariff levels are determined by the respective District Council, but without specific targets of cost coverage. Tariffs are generally low and have not been revised in the last years. In Dar es Salaam the average water tariff in 2008 was 599/= or US$0.46 per m^{3}. Lindi had the highest average water tariff: 833/= or US$0.64 per m^{3}. The average urban water tariff was 437/40, equivalent to US$0.34 per m^{3}.

UWSSAs carry out water metering. In Arusha, Dodoma, Moshi, Mwanza and Tanga 100% of household connections are reported as metered. The figures are above 50% in eleven other cities, with Lindi performing worst with 26% of metered connections. As of 2008 there were in total over 331,000 metered household connections in the territory served by regional utilities (the figure almost doubled compared to 2007—about 169,000 metered connections). The maintenance of water meters and the associated costs have been identified by MoWI as one of the pressing problems for urban water suppliers.

Concerning affordability, an analysis of the 2007 household budget survey shows that the wealthiest quintile of Tanzanians spends more than TSh 4,000/= (US$3.10) per month for water, corresponding to about 1 per cent of their income. Those in the poorest quintile spend only about 1,000/= (US$0.77) per month for water, but this represents 4.5 per cent of their income. One of the reasons why the poor spend less in absolute terms on water is that they fetch water for free from wells and streams. The data are not differentiated between rural and urban areas, although it is likely that the urban poor who have no access to free water sources pay much more for water than those in rural areas.

=== Investment and financing ===
Investment. According to the Ministry of Water and Irrigation, the total budget for the water and sanitation sector in fiscal year 2008–2009 was TSh 286.5 billion, equivalent to US$220 million. Of these, US$175 million were actually spent. The budget approved for fiscal year 2009–2010 is TSh 309.6 billion, or US$238 million. 40.1% has been allocated to rural water and sanitation and 43.9% to urban water and sewerage. Water resources management and institutional development and capacity building have been allocated 8.5% and 7.4% of the budget respectively. The UN Water Country Brief for Tanzania, however, shows an estimate for average annual drinking water and sanitation expenditures in the period 2002–2011. According to that report, government investment expenditures were only US$30 million per year plus official development aid disbursements of US$82 million per year, about seven times less than the government figures for fiscal year 2008–09. Expenditures fluctuated substantially from year to year, with a peak in 2008–09.

The Public Expenditure Report of the Water Sector provides a detailed analysis of the patterns of budget spending. It appears that in the water sector large part of the budget is made up of development expenditures and only 15% are recurrent expenditures (compared to the 55% share of development expenditures in the total government budget). Moreover, as a result of the decentralization policy of the government, the budget allocated to local government authorities and regions has increased rapidly. In fiscal year 2008–2009 LGAs had a share in the total water sector budget of about 25%, while the figure was 20% for regions. Conversely, an increasing part of central government budget is devoted to feasibility studies: this reflects the co-ordinating and policy setting role to which MoWI is shifting.

Financing. Tanzania is one of the largest recipient countries of foreign aid in Sub-Saharan Africa. This includes assistance in the form of grants, concessional loans and debt relief. Aid management in Tanzania is guided by the Joint Assistance Strategy (JAST) approved in 2006 and aimed at implementing the principles of the Paris Declaration on Aid Effectiveness. JAST advocates the integration of all development funds into the government budget, fosters national ownership and promotes a "division of labour" between donors. The Public Expenditure Report however suggests that not all spending in the water sector is included in the government budget. A comparison between OECD and Ministry of Finance data on bilateral aid shows that there is a gap between the two sources. This indicates that there has been off-budget financing of about 26% of total bilateral aid in the past five years. According to data published by MoWI, of the funds budgeted for the water and sanitation sector for fiscal year 2009–2010, about 88% will be provided from foreign transfers.

== External cooperation ==
Tanzania receives external support from several donor agencies. They are organised in the Development Partners Group (DPG) which aims to improve donor harmonisation and aid effectiveness. Sector dialogue between DPG and the Ministries responsible for water is carried out through four thematic working groups that cover water, sanitation and hygiene issues.

The five major donors in the Tanzanian water and sanitation sector are: the African Development Bank, the European Commission, Germany, the Netherlands and the World Bank. Within the scope of JAST, the Government of Tanzania the World Bank, Germany, and the Dutch government contribute to the WSDP Basket Fund which is a form of a Sector-Wide Approach (SWAp). Other donors include: French AFD, Japanese JICA, Belgium, Switzerland, UK (DFID), US (USAID and MCC).

=== African Development Bank ===
The African Development Bank (AfDB) is present in the Tanzanian water and sanitation sector with three projects. Dar es Salaam Water Supply & Sanitation, initiated in 2001, focuses on improving the accessibility, quality and reliability of water supply and sanitation in Dar es Salaam. The Monduli District Water Supply Project was approved in 2003 with the aim of securing adequate and sustainable access to safe drinking water to the population of eighteen villages in Monduli District. AfDB provided a grant of about US$10 million that covered 90% of the project costs. Since 2006, the AfDB together with other donors is contributing to the Rural Water Supply and Sanitation Program. The program aims at improving rural communities' access to water and sanitation services and improving institutional capacity—both at district and government level - to carry out demand based rural water and sanitation projects.

=== European Commission ===
The European Commission provides support to the Tanzanian water and sanitation sector through the resources of the European Development Fund National Indicative Programme (NIP) and the EU Water Initiative. At the end of 2008, thirteen projects co-funded by the Water Initiative were under implementation, for a total of €20.08 million. EU cooperation in the water and sanitation sector focuses on poor populations in urban and peri-urban areas. Between 2003 and 2007, the EU committed round €33 million to the Water Supply Programme to Regional Centres, jointly financed by German financial cooperation. The main objective of the programme was to improve the access to sustainable quality water supply and wastewater management services in the three regional centres of Mwanza, Iringa and Mbeya. Further funds of about €6.6 million were provided for the Mwanza Sewerage Rehabilitation Project between 2000 and 2004, whose aim was to prevent the overflow of raw sewage from Mwanza to Lake Victoria. Rural water and sanitation is supported through the EU general budget line for co-financing NGOs in developing countries.

=== Germany ===
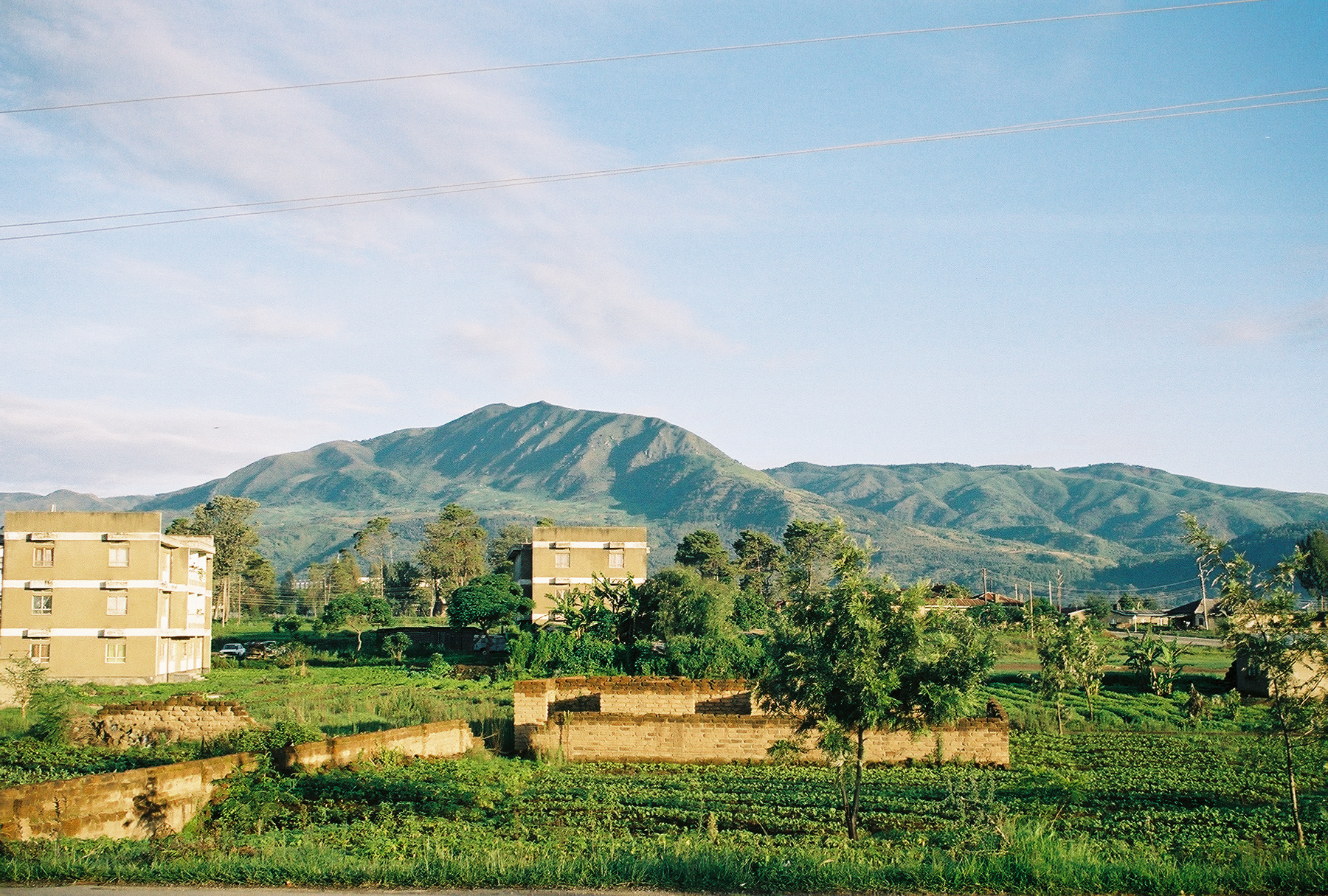
Mbeya is a town where German development cooperation supports improved access to water supply and sanitation.

Since the 1970s, Germany has been cooperating with the Government of Tanzania in its attempts to improve the water supply and sanitation situation in the country. German Development cooperation is carried out mainly by KfW and GIZ. Between 2007 and 2009, KfW provided EUR17.25 million for the Water Basket. In addition, KfW is active in several national and regional projects in Tanzania. For example, in 2003 KfW provided 21 million euros for the project Supporting Regional Center's Water Supply and Sewerage in the rapidly growing towns of Mbeya and Mwanza. A feasibility study and investment plan were also prepared for Iringa, where implementation begun in 2006. The objective of the project was to improve the water supply, sanitation and sewerage services by strengthening the capacity of autonomous urban water supply authorities. To achieve this, water supply facilities have been extended and rehabilitated, sanitation facilitates have been upgraded and capacity building measures have been carried out, including improvement of IT systems used for billing.

GIZ develops local capacities in the sector, including in the Ministry, EWURA and in commercial service providers, such as those in Tanga and in Kilimanjaro Region.

=== India ===
In 2012 the Indian government provided a US$178 million loan for the implementation of water projects to alleviate water scarcity in Dar es Salaam "by 2014". The loan will finance an increase in the capacity of the Upper Ruvu plant to 196,000 cubic meters from the current 82,000 cubic meters a day and to construct a new transmission line from the plant to the city. As of 2012, some parts of the city received water twice a week while others did not get any.

=== The Netherlands ===
The Government of the Netherlands provided funding for the WSDP Water Basket (through a mandate to KfW). In addition, the Netherlands Development Organisation (SNV) provides support in three main areas of the water and sanitation sector: (a) improving the functionality of existing water points through water point mapping (carried out in cooperation with WaterAid), (b) support to water, sanitation and hygiene activities in schools, and (c) capacity building in IWRM.

=== United States ===
The US provides a US$66.3 million grant to finance the expansion of the Lower Ruvu Plant that supplies Dar es Salaam with water from 180,000 to 270,000 cubic meter per day, as well as to reduce non-revenue water and to rehabilitate two treatment plants in Morogoro next to Dar es Salaam. Additionally, USAID/Tanzania funded a 3-year $15 million Tanzania Integrated Water Supply, Sanitation and Hygiene (iWASH) program which included complementary support from the Water and Development Alliance (WADA) partnership between USAID and The Coca-Cola Company. The program began in January 2010 and funding was extended first through 2013, and later through 2015 (with additional financing of $4.6 million). A 2-year supplemental program, WADA II, began in September 2010 and was extended to August 2013 through funding with the Global Environment and Technology Foundation (GETF). This integrated program (iWASH)works to support sustainable, market-driven water supply, sanitation, and hygiene services to improve health and increase economic resiliency of the poor in targeted rural areas and small towns within an integrated water resource management framework.

=== World Bank ===
The World Bank provides extensive support to Tanzania. In December 2009, it approved the Seventh Poverty Reduction Support Credit (PRSC): the fourth in a series of five annual budget support operations to the implementation of MKUKUTA. The Seventh PRSC entailed a commitment of US$170 million. In the water sector, the World Bank committed US$200 million to the Water Sector Support Project for the years 2007 to 2012. The project has four components: a) strengthening institutional capacity for improving the management of water resources; b) providing support to local governments in the scaling up of the provision of rural water and sanitation services in pursuit of the MDGs; c) giving support to Dar es Salaam, all regional and district capitals, and gazetted small town utilities in the scaling up of provision of urban water and sanitation services; and d) providing support in institutional capacity building, including sector coordination and policy re-alignment.

The World Bank-administered Water and Sanitation Program is also active in Tanzania where it provides support in the areas of sanitation and hygiene.

== See also ==
- Natural resource and waste management in Tanzania
