= Water point mapping =

Water Point Mapping (WPM) is a tool for monitoring the distribution and status of water supplies. It collects data about different aspects related to the water facility and overlays this point data with information about population and administrative boundaries. WPM helps to visualize the spatial distribution of water supply coverage and can thereby be used to highlight equity issues. The information collected provides insights into schemes' sustainability levels and management-related aspects of water points.

WPM can be used to (i) to inform the planning of investments to improve water supply coverage; (ii) to allocate resources to deliver basic services where they are most needed; (iii) to promote increased investments in the sector; and (iv) to measure progress and performance.

== Relevance of mapping ==
The Millennium Development Goals include a specific target (number 10 of Goal 7) to deal with people who do not access safe drinking water and basic sanitation. To adequately assess peoples' access to these basic services it is vital that there is accessible, accurate and reliable data that is routinely collected and updated.

A variety of tools and techniques have been developed in recent years to collect such information. However, unless data is easily accessible and is presented in a user-friendly format, decision makers commonly do without the information. One alternative that has been designed to manage large volumes of data and to enable a user-friendly presentation is to use geo-referenced datasets, which provide a means of integration of data from different sources at any point on the globe. Within such a framework, for any specific point on the map (identified by its grid reference) detailed and accurate data of different nature can be linked in an integrated way. Mapping therefore involves the presentation of certain information in a spatial context, and this enables policy planners to identify the geographic areas and communities in which to focus their efforts for maximum impact. In all, mapping presents many benefits, such as:

- It makes easier to integrate data from different sources (surveys, censuses, satellites, etc.) and from different disciplines (social, economic, and environmental data). It also allows the switch to new units of analysis from, for example, administrative boundaries (e.g. state) to ecological boundaries (e.g. basin).
- Maps are a powerful visual tool and are more easily understood by stakeholders, particularly in developing countries.
- The spatial nature of water poverty, such as the distance to the nearest water source or the water supply infrastructure, can also be incorporated easily in a GIS database.
- The allocation of resources can be improved, since geographic targeting is more efficient and cost-effective than to launch an equally expensive universal distribution programme.
- Geo-referenced databases can be enriched by additional data as they become available; and new attributes, such as better details on water quality, can be incorporated into the data structure, ensuring that the relevance of the data is sustained over time.
- Maps can be produced at a number of different resolutions depending on their purpose and the cost of data collection. A coarse resolution or a scale too small neglects the heterogeneity within each unit and provides insufficient detail for decision making, while a fine resolution or a scale too large increases the cost of compiling, managing, and analyzing the data.

== Methodology ==
Water Point Mapping (WPM) can be defined as an 'exercise whereby the geographical positions of all improved water points in an area are gathered in addition to management, technical and demographical information'. A handheld Global Positioning System (GPS) unit is used to record the precise location and approximate altitude of all water points audited; a digital camera is used to capture photographs of each water point in order to show the status and physical conditions; and a structured questionnaire is completed to document main characteristics, such as: location, functionality, category of water supply, water quality perception, management issues, ownership and water tariff payment. All collected data is entered into a geographical information system and correlated with available demographic, administrative, and physical data. The information is finally displayed using digital maps.

WPM seeks to serve two different purposes:

- To easily show the distribution of water points in a territory. This could enhance efficiency and transparency in local government's planning while enabling a higher degree of accountability towards population.
- To allow the definition of more reliable access indicators, which are to be constructed from the lowest geographical level with collected data.

The strength of water point maps is that they provide a clear message on who is and is not served; and particularly in rural areas, WPM can be used to highlight equity issues and schemes' functionality levels below the district level. In many developing countries, water sector ministries are undertaking reforms towards decentralization, transferring the responsibility of services management and resource allocation to local planners. This requires adequate performance monitoring frameworks backed up by accurate and reliable data at local level. WPM is increasingly thought of as a way to collect this information and display it through easy-to-use maps.

As a survey tool, WPM was originally designed and promoted by WaterAid in Malawi, although in recent years it has been carried out in different countries (Ethiopia, Ghana, Kenya, Malawi, Tanzania, Uganda, etc.) by a number of stakeholders (WaterAid, SNV, Ingeniería Sin Fronteras - ApD, Concern; etc.).

=== Improved and unimproved water points ===
Main goal of WPM is to develop a comprehensive record of improved water points at a particular geographic area. The types of water points considered as improved are consistent with those accepted internationally by the Joint Monitoring Programme for Water Supply and Sanitation of WHO/UNICEF, where definition of improved is technology-based. More specifically, an improved water point is a place with some improved facilities where water is drawn for various uses such as drinking, washing and cooking.

Definitions of "improved" and "unimproved" water points
"Improved"
- Piped water into dwelling, plot or yard
- Piped water into neighbour's plot
- Public tap/standpipe
- Tubewell / borehole
- Protected dug well
- Protected spring
- Rainwater
"Unimproved"
- Unprotected dug well
- Unprotected spring
- Small cart with tank/drum
- Tanker truck
- Surface water (river, dam, lake, etc.)
- Bottled water †

† Considered as "not improved" because of concerns about the quantity of water supplied, not because of concerns over the water quality.

=== Water quality and seasonality issues ===
Despite its growing importance, the issue of water quality has long been nearly absent from water coverage assessments, since few countries could afford regular water quality surveillance. Instead, it is assumed that certain types of water sources categorized as 'improved' are likely to deliver drinking water of adequate quality for basic health needs. This assumption appears over-optimistic, and improved technologies are shown not to be providing in all circumstances safe water. Similarly, health-related gains in water interventions are also dependent on service reliability; and it has been seen for example that annual health benefits attributed to the consumption of safe water are almost entirely lost if raw water is consumed over the course of few days. This draws attention to the issue of reliability and seasonality of drinking water sources.

Against this background, the Spanish NGO Ingeniería Sin Fronteras - Asociación para el Dessarrollo (ISF-ApD) complements the standard WPM campaign with two additional actions: (i) basic water quality tests are carried out using portable water testing kits (measuring pH, turbidity, chlorine, electrical conductivity and concentration of faecal coliforms); and (ii) the year-round functionality of water points is assessed by means of direct questions to users. The methodology used is ultimately designed to estimate the coverage of year-round safe improved water points of a certain territory.

=== Indicators for sector performance monitoring ===
One drawback of water point maps is that they are only as accurate as the underlying data collected, so that there is a need to define reliable but simple indicators as the basis of the monitoring framework. Clearly, the core sector indicator is water supply coverage, and in rural areas, access to water is normally defined by establishing a ratio of the maximum distance and number of people served by each water point. Three different possibilities exist when defining access:

1. Calculate coverage as the standard number of people served per water point (normally defined in the water policy) multiplied by the number of water points, regardless of distance from dwellings to the water point.
2. Calculate coverage by considering the people served by water point as the number of people living at a certain distance from it, regardless the maximum number of people to be served by a water point as defined in the corresponding water policy.
3. A case-specific approach combining both of the above conditions and applying the most restrictive one in each scenario.

In order to accurately assess the number of people served using distance as a criterion (no. 2) the spatial distribution of population is required, and this is problematic in the majority of cases. Despite the progress made with satellite free access images, many rural areas are still not covered with sufficient precision. On the other hand, due to periodic sociological census undertaken in nearly all countries, population distribution in administrative structures is usually quite well documented. Thus, first above-mentioned criterion is the most commonly used.

With this information, the percentage of access to water in an area is estimated, and first indicator of access can be defined as Improved Community Water Point Density, which is equal to the number of Improved Community Water Points per 1,000 inhabitants. A certain area would have access if its density of water points per 1,000 inhabitants is above the national threshold, and percentage of people not served in an area would be proportional to the lack of water points available compared to that threshold. However, to further improve Improved Community Water Point indicators is simple since information on functionality for each water point is also collected during the survey. Non-functionality is an important obstacle to access to rural water supply, and in sub-Saharan Africa averages around 35%. Consequently, Functional Community Water Point Density can be used as more accurate access indicator. If water quality and seasonality issues are taken into consideration, other 'access' indicators can be defined, as shown in following Table.

List of indicators
Indicator

Improved community WP density
Functional community WP density
Year-round functional community WP density
Bacteriological acceptable WP density
Bacteriological acceptable and year-round functional WP density

Calculation

No. of improved community WPs per 1,000 inhabitants
No. of functional Improved Community Water Points per 1,000 inhabitants
No. of Improved Community Water Points working at least 11 months per year, per 1,000 inhabitants
No. of functional Improved Community Water Points with an acceptable number of coliforms, per 1,000 inhabitants
No. of Improved Community Water Points working at least 11 months per year and with an acceptable number of coliforms, per 1,000 inhabitants

=== Combining WPM data with household-based information ===
In addition to safe water supplies, basic sanitation and hygiene also have significant impact on household health.

Provision and use of sanitation isolates contaminated faeces from the environment, and therefore the consistent use of the facility, not its mere existence, is likely to lead to health and environmental improvements. However and in much the same way as with water supply, care is needed to define an acceptable form of excreta disposal. A wide range of technologies is used, particularly for settings where low-cost solutions are required, and relevant research conducted elsewhere concluded that all types of facility can be operated hygienically. As a result, sanitation technologies are considered as providing adequate access to sanitation as long as they are private (but not shared / public) and hygienically separate human faeces from human contact. Likewise, the addition of hygiene education is required to see health impacts materialize, in particular the basic issues of hand washing, proper disposal of faeces, and protection of drinking water. An integrated water, sanitation and hygiene (WASH) approach for data collection would consequently provide decision-makers with greater diagnostic power than focussing separately on each of these three components.

Definitions of "improved sanitation" and "unimproved" sanitation
""Improved"
- Flush or pour-flush to piped sewer system
- Flush or pour-flush to septic tank
- Flush or pour-flush to pit latrine
- Ventilated improved pit latrine (VIP)
- Pit latrine with slab
- Composting toilet
"Unimproved"
- Flush or pour-flush to elsewhere †
- Pit latrine without slab or open pit
- Bucket
- Hanging toilet or hanging latrine
- No facilities or bush or field (open defecation)
- Public or shared sanitation facilities

† Excreta are flushed to the street, yard or plot, open sewer, a ditch, a drainage way or other location

The strength of WPM is comprehensiveness with respect to the sample of water points audited, which results in the need of roughly covering the overall area of intervention. The drawback of the WPM approach, however, is that the focus is on water points, while sanitation and hygiene data need to be collected at the household. An approach for WASH data collection that combines a water points mapping with a household-based survey might overcome previous constraint. The new methodology takes the WPM as a starting point to comprehensively record all improved water points, being the water point basic sampling unit. This information can be then combined with data provided from a household survey to assess sanitation and hygienic habits. In terms of method, the approach adopted includes: (i) identification and audit of all improved water points; (ii) calculation of a sample size of households that is representative at and below the district level; and (iii) random household selection at the water point.

== Applications ==
WPM can be used to support different types of analysis, and specific applications include among others broad strategic planning, priority setting exercises and performance monitoring. Potential users of WPM outcomes include organizations that have water poverty alleviation as their mandate, for example, at the international level, UN agencies, the World Bank, bilateral development agencies and international NGOs. Crowdsourced remote sensing and pseudo-live water point mapping provided by waterforecast.net

=== Planning at local level ===
Maps have come out a powerful tool for identifying and targeting the most deprived population, and therefore support poverty reduction initiatives. However, its potential remains underexploited. A recent study developed by WaterAid concluded that the use of this tool for better planning at the district level was still low despite the acknowledgment of its potential usefulness. Two major challenges in this regard were related to the regular updating of information and to the mechanisms to include WPM evidence in the planning process. This created a vicious circle, since the more outdated WPM data became, the less useful it was for planning purposes.

The INGO ISF-ApD and Same District Council (Tanzania) developed a methodology to update WPM data and use them to help inform planning decisions. First activity was to prepare a District Water and Sanitation priority document. A set of objective criteria were defined (using WPM information) in order to rank communities based on service level and infrastructure status. Criteria used included among others coverage, need for rehabilitation, seasonality of services, quality of water delivered, and poor management. Each criterion produced one different ranking, and this enabled an accurate prioritization of future interventions and rehabilitations in the district, a part from defining a wide range of related supporting activities. The priority document was approved and issued in September 2009 by the District Authority, and it was also used to set the priorities for all sector-related stakeholders operating within the district.

=== Analysis of functionality of water points ===
WPM data can be used to analyze the durability of water points depending on different factors such as time after construction, technology, management framework, or the approach adopted in the implementation. Lessons that have been learned from this analysis might help local governments and other agencies to address the sustainability challenge. The Water Point Data Exchange, launched in 2015, is a global platform for sharing water point data collected by governments, non-profit organizations, researchers, and others.

=== Advocacy ===
Maps are also a powerful tool for advocacy, since they provide clear messages and communicate complex information quickly and accurately. In addition, local governments have used mapping evidences to lobby for additional funding, and citizens have used them to pressure their representatives for better services.

At the same time, diverse initiatives are underway to display maps via web, as an attempt to foster accountability and disseminate WPM outputs to a broader public. For example, the h2.0 initiative of UN Habitat and Google, the Water Point Mapper developed by WaterAid, or the support made by the Water and Sanitation program to the establishment of WatSan portals in many African countries.

Researchers at ODI found that Water Mapping could improve accountability in service delivery. Accountability could be achieved through the creation of Community Maps and the public availability of mapping knowledge which empower the community.

=== Monitoring the sector ===
WPM is an adequate tool to support monitoring and evaluation of the sector. Water poverty follows a highly heterogeneous pattern, widely varying between and within different geographic and administrative units; and mapping permits a feasible visualization of such heterogeneity. In addition, maps are well suited to illustrate spatial change over time.

== See also ==
- Joint Monitoring Programme for Water Supply and Sanitation
- List of water supply and sanitation by country
