= Victorine Ndjoli Elonga =

Congolese entrepreneur and politician (1933–2015)

- Born: 12 March 1933; Léopoldville, Belgian Congo
- Died: 27 February 2015 (aged 81); Kinshasa, Democratic Republic of the Congo
- Other names: Maman Vicky, Victorine Njoli
- Occupations: Entrepreneur, politician
- Known for: First Congolese woman to obtain a driving licence (1955)

Victorine Ndjoli Elonga (also Victorine Njoli or Maman Vicky; 12 March 1933 – 27 February 2015) was an entrepreneur and politician from the Democratic Republic of the Congo.

== Biography ==
=== Early life and education ===
Victorine Ndjoli Elonga was born in Léopoldville, now Kinshasa, in the Belgian Congo. She studied with the Franciscan Sisters and learned sewing.

=== Career ===
On 25 January 1955, she became the first Congolese woman to obtain a driving licence. She founded a successful sewing business in Léopoldville. In 1964, she was one of ten Congolese women who held a hunger strike in Egypt so that Congo would be admitted to the Organisation of African Unity. In 1967, she was appointed commissioner of the Tshangu area in Kinshasa. She died on 27 February 2015 in Kinshasa. In 2026, the Congolese Press Agency (ACP) reported that she had been named among the women pioneers of the Congo.
