= Kinshasa =

Capital and most populous city of DR Congo

Kinshasa Kinsásá (Lingala)
- Capital city and province
- Ville de Kinshasa
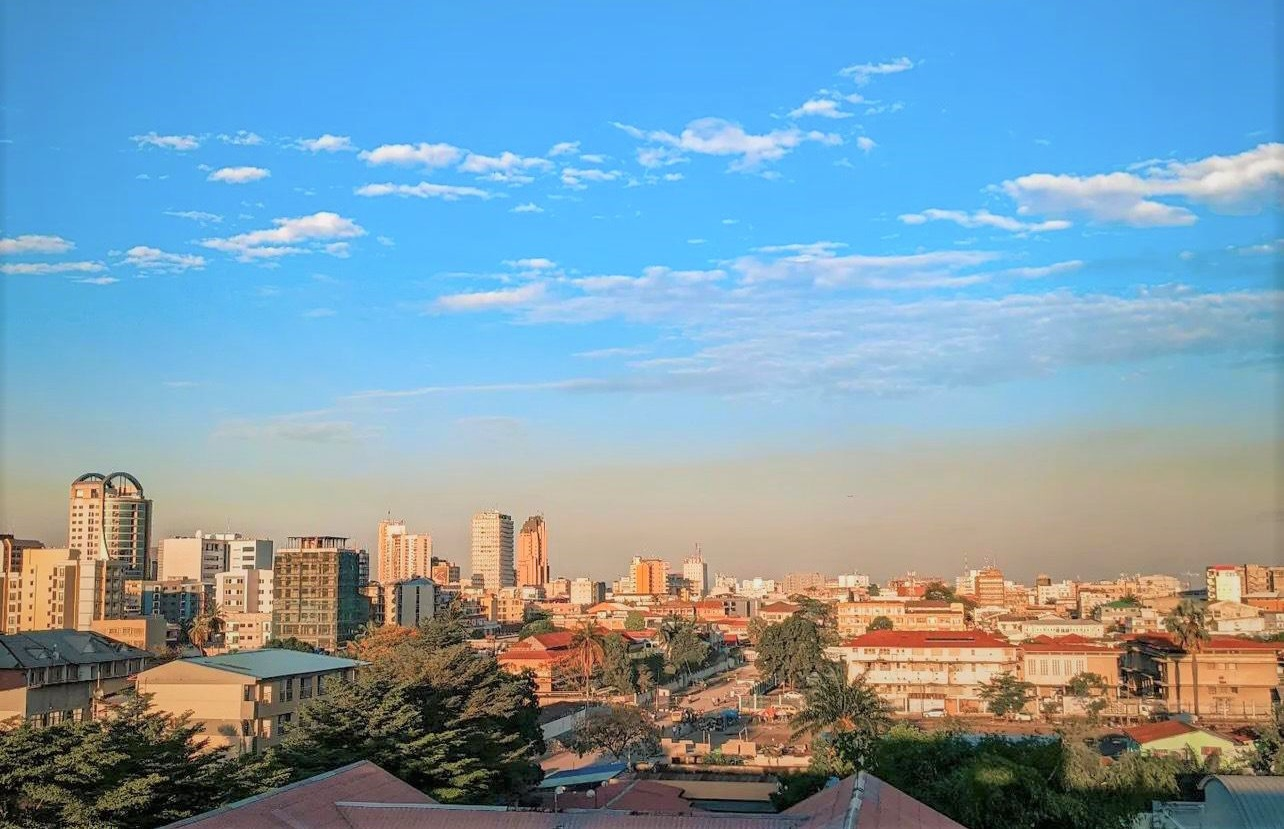
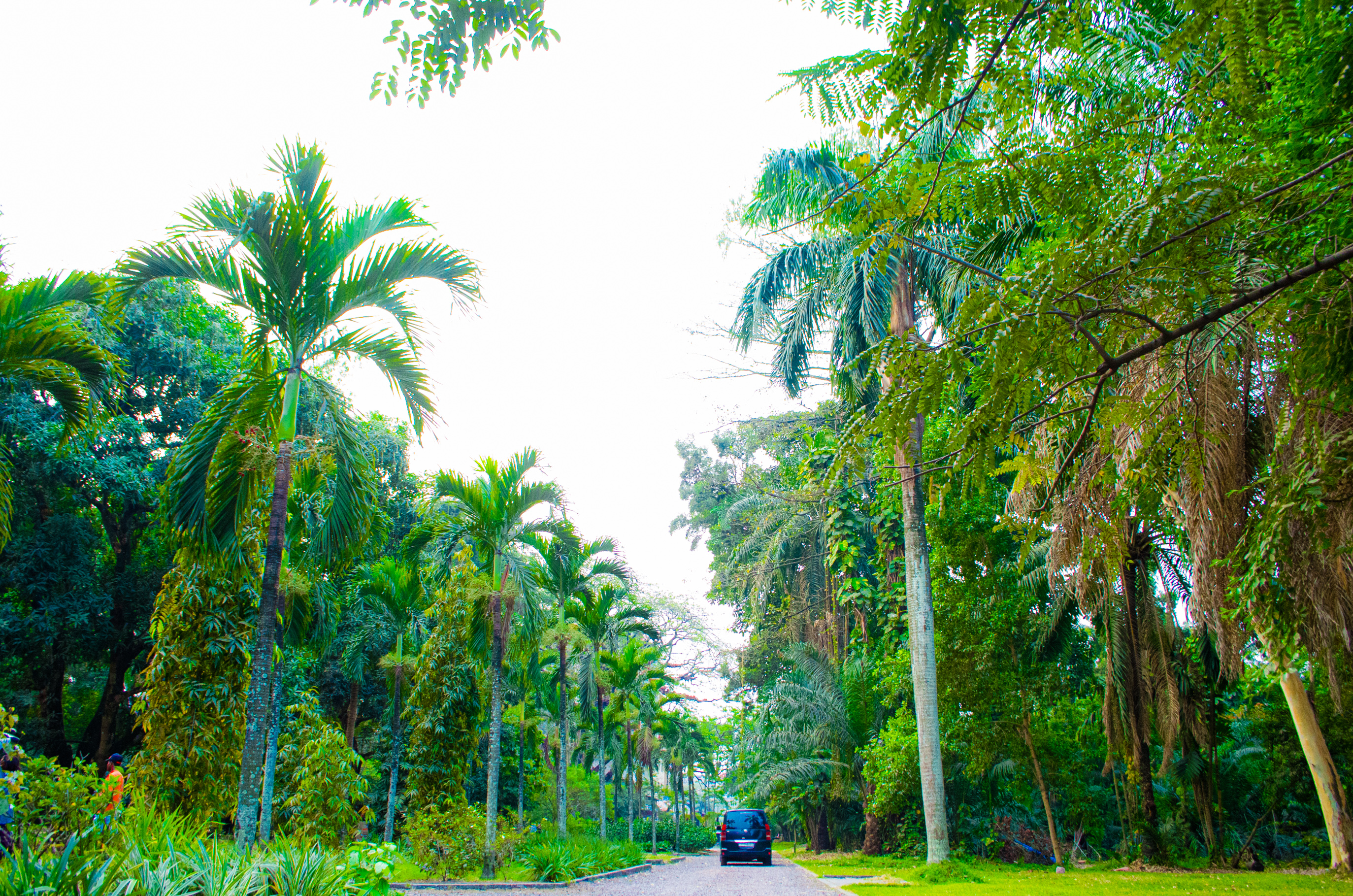
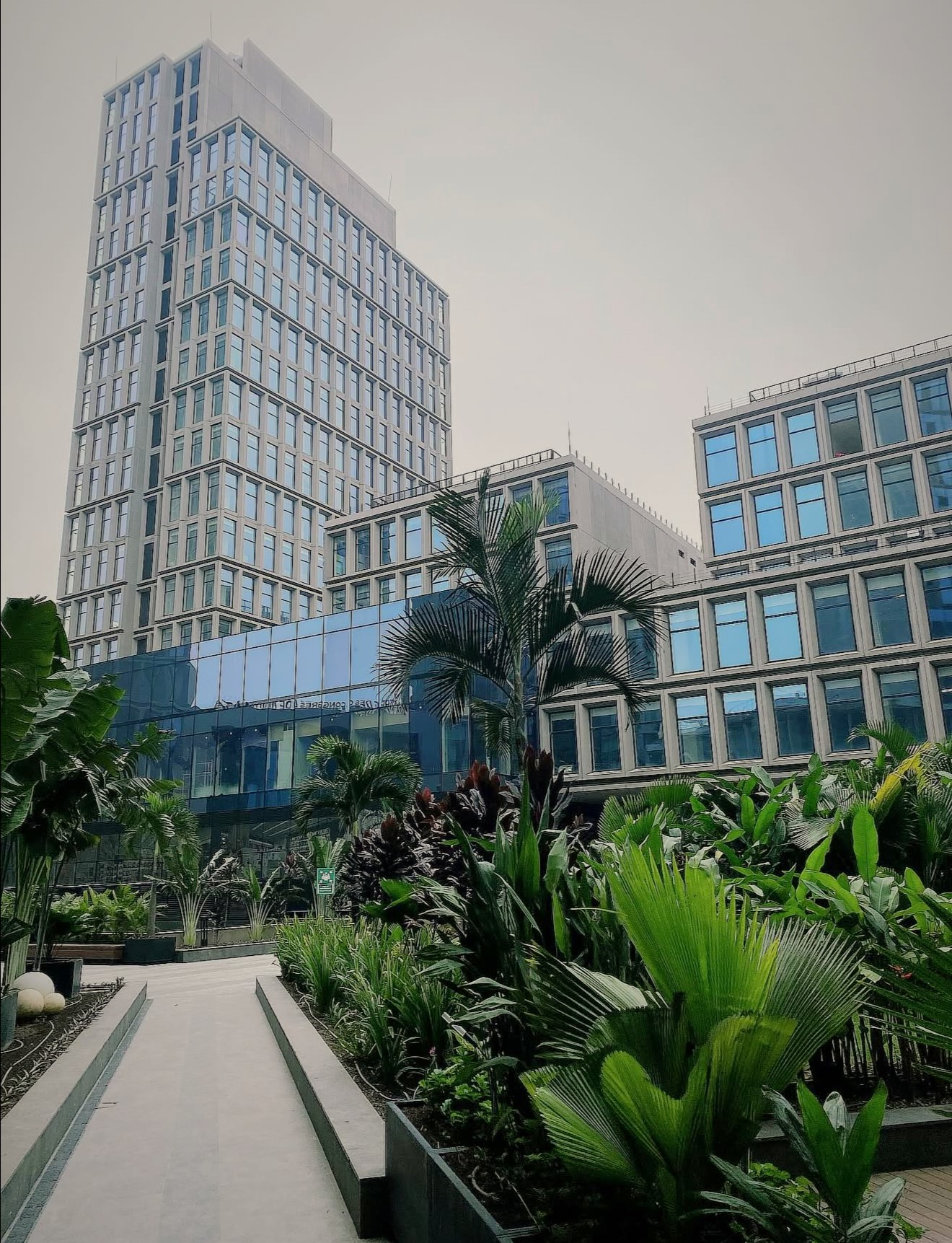
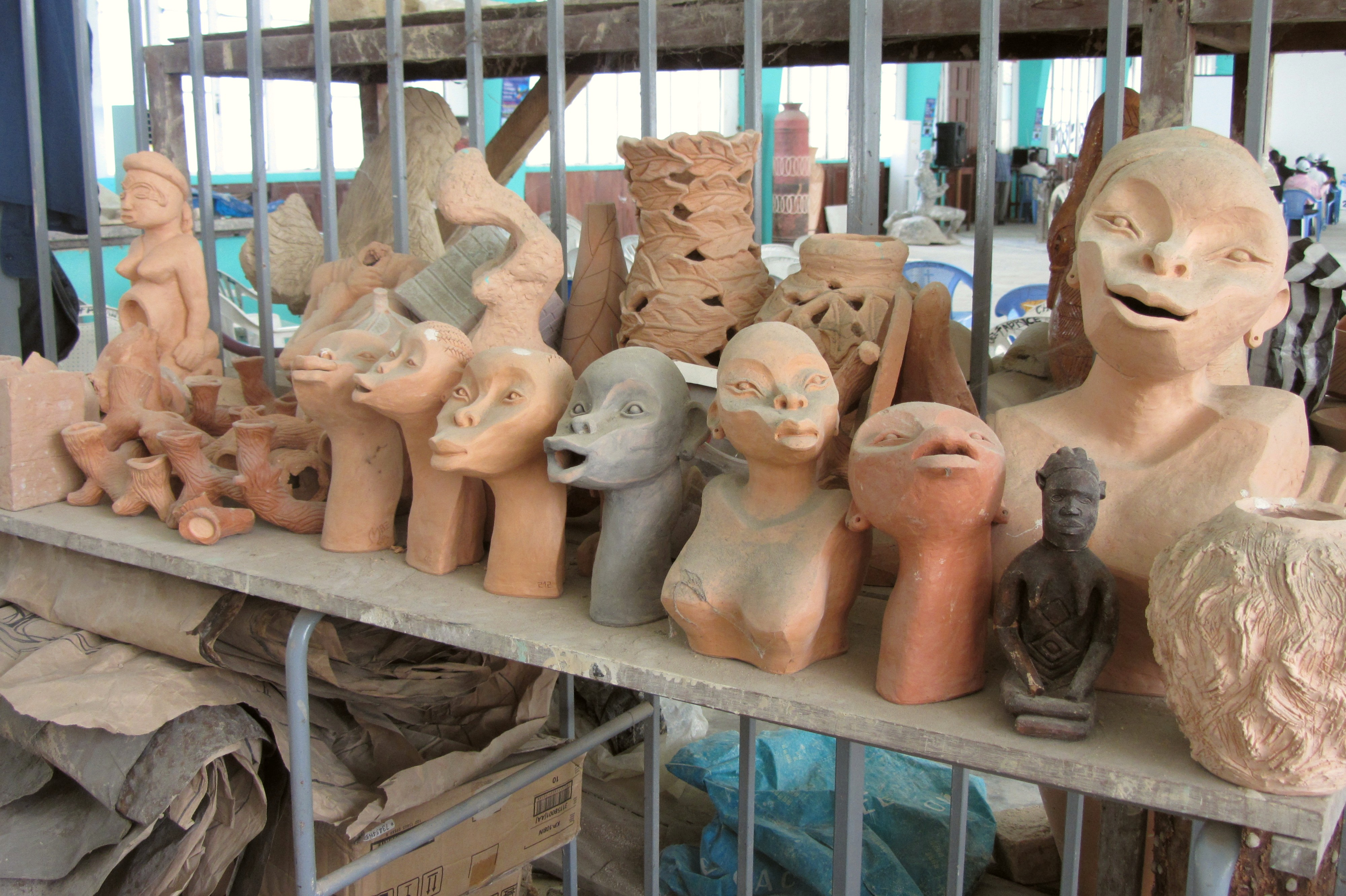
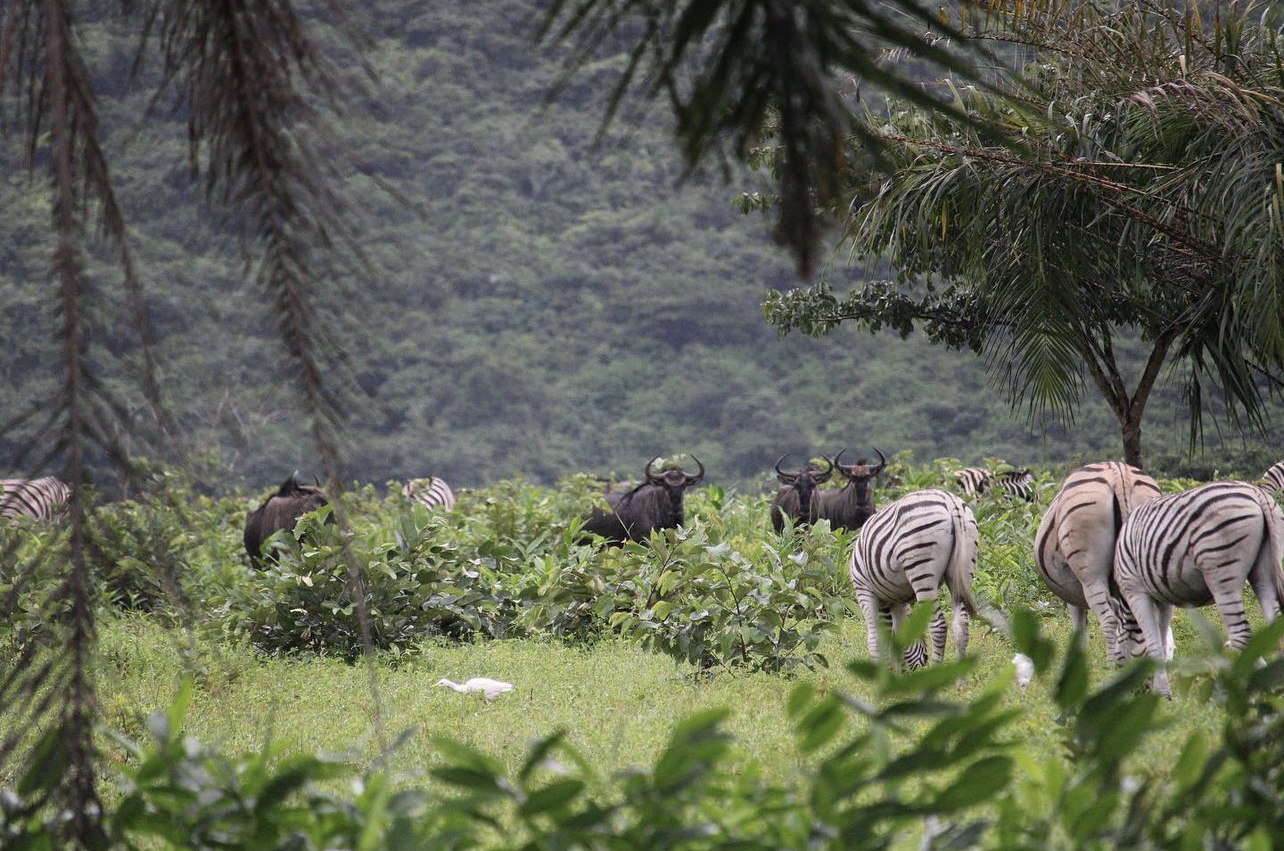
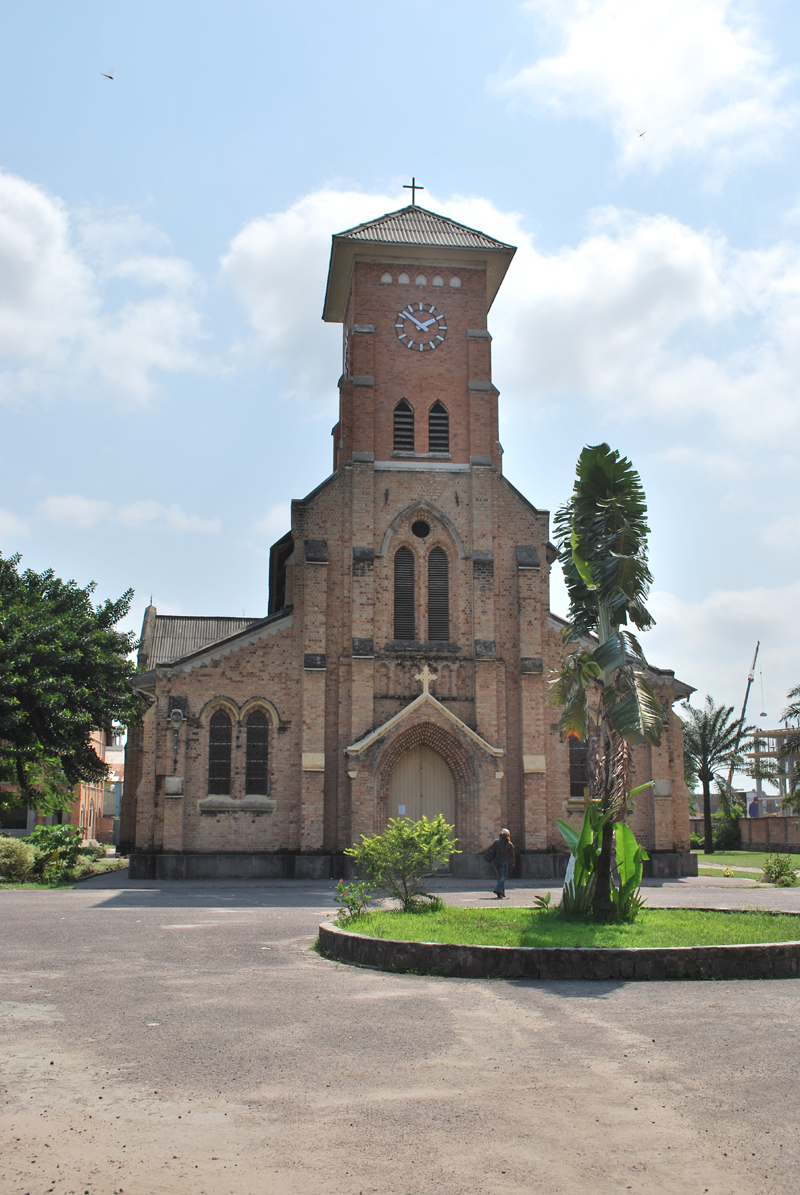
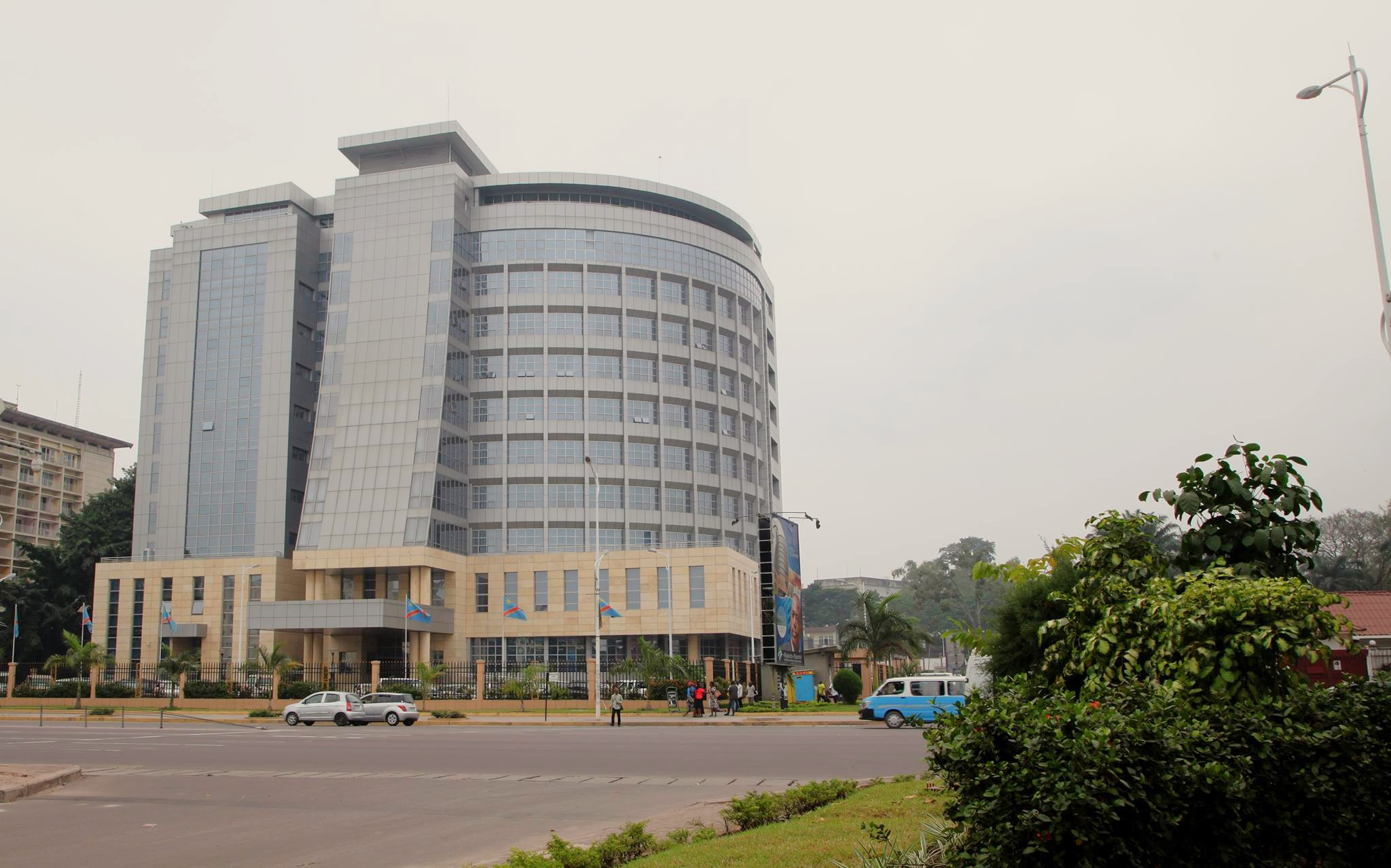
- View over Gombe, Kinshasa Kinshasa Botanical Garden Kinshasa Financial Center Académie des Beaux-Arts Nsele Valley Park St. Anne's Church Immeuble du Gouvernement Gécamines Building

- Flag Seal
- Nickname: Kin la belle (lit. 'Kin the beautiful')
- Kinshasa on map of DR Congo provinces

- Kinshasa on map of DR Congo Kinshasa (Africa)
- Coordinates: 04°19′19″S 15°18′43″E
- Country: Democratic Republic of the Congo
- Founded: 1881 (as Léopoldville)
- City hall: Hôtel de ville de Kinshasa, La Gombe
- Communes: List: Bandalungwa; Barumbu; Bumbu; Gombe (formerly Kalina); Kalamu; Kasa-Vubu; Kimbanseke; Kinshasa; Kintambo; Kisenso; Lemba; Limete; Lingwala; Makala; Maluku; Masina; Matete; Mont Ngafula; Ndjili; Ngaba; Ngaliema; Ngiri-Ngiri; Nsele; Selembao

Government
  - Body: Provincial Assembly of Kinshasa
  - Governor: Daniel Bumba Lubaki

Area
  - City-province: 9,965 km^{2} (3,848 sq mi)
  - Urban: 600 km^{2} (230 sq mi)
- Elevation: 240 m (790 ft)

Population (2021)
  - City-province: 18,552,800
  - Rank: 3rd in Africa; 1st in the DRC
  - Density: 1,462/km^{2} (3,790/sq mi)
  - Urban: 16,316,000
  - Urban density: 27,000/km^{2} (70,000/sq mi)
  - Metro: 17,778,500
  - Language: French and Lingala
- Demonym(s): Kinois, Kinshasan; Léopoldvillian (1881–1966)

Ethnic groups
  - Native: Bahumbu • Bateke • Bamfununga and Bayaka
- Time zone: UTC+01:00 (WAT)
- Area code: 243
- ISO 3166 code: CD-KN
- License Plate Code: (Democratic Republic of the Congo) CGO / 01
- Climate: aw
- HDI (2023): 0.623medium · 1st of 11

Kinshasa (/kɪnˈʃɑːsə/; French: [kinʃasa]; Lingala: Kinsásá), formerly named Léopoldville (Dutch: Leopoldstad) from 1881 to 1966, is the capital and largest city of the Democratic Republic of the Congo. Kinshasa is one of the world's fastest-growing megacities, with an estimated population of 18.5 million in 2026. It is the most densely populated city in the DRC, the third-most populous city and third-largest metropolitan area in Africa, the world's seventh-most populous city proper (the most populous outside of China), and the fourth-most populous capital city in the world. It is the leading economic, political, and cultural center of the DRC, housing several industries including manufacturing, telecommunications, banking, and entertainment. The city also hosts some of the DRC's significant institutional buildings, such as the People's Palace, Palace of the Nation, Constitutional Court, Court of Cassation, Council of State, African Union City, Marble Palace, Government House, Kinshasa Financial Center, and other national departments and agencies.

The Kinshasa site has been inhabited by Teke and Humbu people for centuries and was known as Nshasa before transforming into a commercial hub during the 19th and 20th centuries. The city was named Léopoldville by Henry Morton Stanley in honor of Leopold II of Belgium. The name was changed to Kinshasa in 1966 during Mobutu Sese Seko's Zairianisation campaign as a tribute to Nshasa village. Covering 9,965 square kilometers, Kinshasa stretches along the southern shores of the Pool Malebo on the Congo River. It forms an expansive crescent across flat, low-lying terrain at an average altitude of about 300 meters. Kinshasa borders the Mai-Ndombe, Kwilu, and Kwango Provinces to the east; the Congo River delineates its western and northern perimeters, constituting a natural border with the Republic of the Congo; to the south lies the Kongo Central Province. Across the river sits Brazzaville, the smaller capital of the neighboring Republic of the Congo, forming the world's closest pair of capital cities despite being separated by a four-kilometer-wide unbridged span of the Congo River.

Kinshasa is also one of the 26 provinces of the Democratic Republic of the Congo and is divided into 24 communes. With an expansive administrative region, over 90 percent of the province's land remains rural, while urban growth predominantly occurs on its western side. Kinshasa is the largest nominally Francophone urban area globally, with French being the language of government, education, media, public services and high-end commerce, while Lingala is used as a lingua franca in the street. The city's inhabitants are popularly known as Kinois, with the term "Kinshasans" used in English terminology.

The National Museum of the Democratic Republic of the Congo is the DRC's most prominent and central museum. The College of Advanced Studies in Strategy and Defense is the highest military institution in the DRC. The National Pedagogical University is the DRC's first pedagogical university. N'Djili International Airport is the largest airport in the nation. In 2015, Kinshasa was designated as a City of Music by UNESCO and has been a member of the Creative Cities Network since then. Nsele Valley Park is the largest urban park in Kinshasa. According to the 2016 annual ranking, Kinshasa is Africa's most expensive city for expatriate employees, ahead of close to 200 global locations.

== Toponymy ==
Sylvain Shomba Kinyamba et al. proposed two theories about the origin of the name Kinshasa. The first was proposed by anthropologist Paul Raymaekers, who connects the prefix Ki(n) to Kikongo and Kimbundu words that refer to a hill or an inhabited place. He links Nsasa or Nshasa to a "bag of salt" and suggests that the site served as a trading post where people arriving from the lower Congo River and the Atlantic Ocean brought salt to exchange for goods, including ivory and enslaved people, supplied by communities from the upper Congo.

The second theory, proposed by anthropologist and historian Hendrik van Moorsel, derives the name from Teke trading terminology. According to this view, Teke fishermen exchanged fish for cassava at a place first known as Ulio. The name then changed over time, becoming Intsaya, then Kintsaya, before becoming Kinshasa. Ethnographer Léo Bittremieux is also said to have used the spelling Kintshasa.

The name Nshasa is also associated with a major trading site on the southern shore of the Pool Malebo, where exchanges took place before Kintambo's commercial expansion. In van Moorsel's interpretation, the name derives from the Teke verb tsaya (or tsaa), meaning "to exchange", and the noun intsaya (or insaa), meaning "market" or "place of exchange". The site reportedly formed part of a trading network involving Teke intermediaries, Banunu Bobangi canoe traders, and Zombo and Kongo merchants exchanging ivory and enslaved people for European goods. Henry Morton Stanley recorded visiting Nshasa on 14 March 1877, during his expedition from Zanzibar to Boma.

== History ==
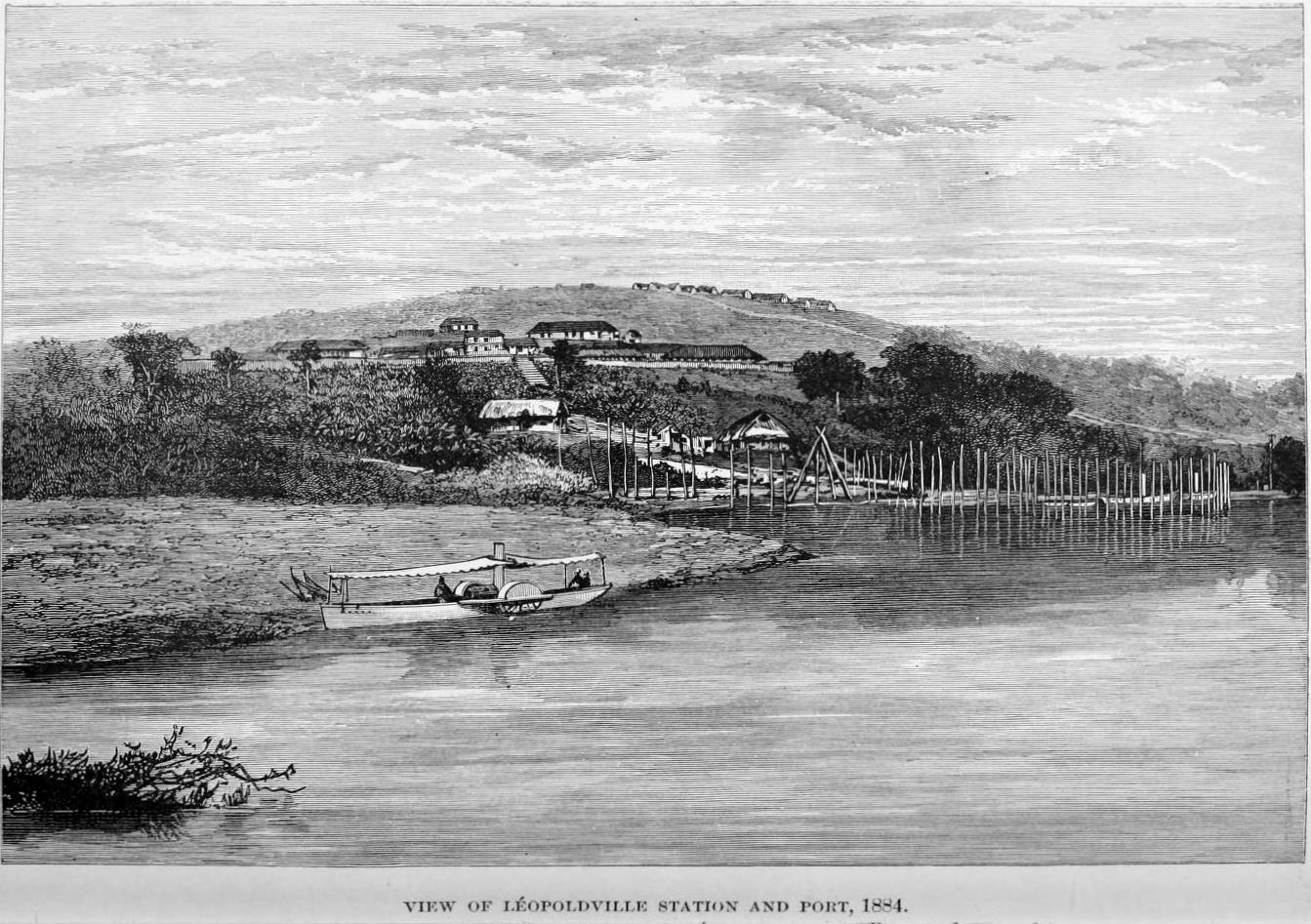
View of Léopoldville station and port (1884)

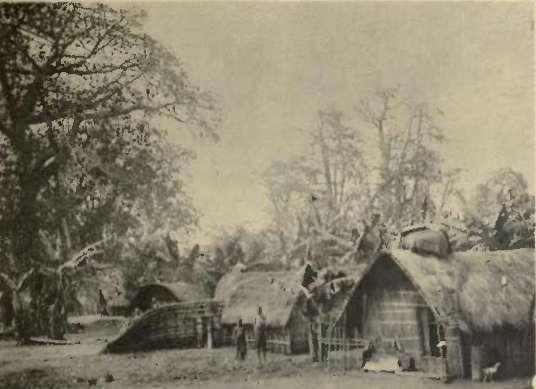
Kinshasa village (1912)

In pre-colonial times, the area was inhabited by two trading centres, Ntamo and Ntsaasa, which were part of the Tio Kingdom.

The city was established as a trading post by Henry Morton Stanley in 1881. It was named Léopoldville in honor of Stanley's employer King Leopold II of the Belgians. He would then proceed to take control of most of the Congo Basin as the Congo Free State, not as a colony but as his private property. The post flourished as the first navigable port on the Congo River above Livingstone Falls, a series of rapids over 300 kilometres (190 miles) below Leopoldville. At first, all goods arriving by sea or being sent by sea had to be carried by porters between Léopoldville and Matadi, the port below the rapids and 150 km (93 mi) from the coast. The completion of the Matadi–Kinshasa portage railway, in 1898, provided an alternative route around the rapids and sparked the rapid development of Léopoldville. In 1914, a pipeline was installed so that crude oil could be transported from Matadi to the upriver steamers in Leopoldville. By 1923, the city was elevated to capital of the Belgian Congo, replacing the town of Boma in the Congo estuary, pursuant to the Royal Decree of 1 July 1923, countersigned by the Minister of the Colonies, Louis Franc. This transition, finalized on 31 October 1929, led to the development of a new administrative district between Kinshasa, which was growing as a trading center, and Léopoldville-West. The site, named Kalina (now Gombe), became the colonial administrative center and housed the governor-general's residence. The transfer was motivated by Léopoldville's position at the terminus of the Matadi–Kinshasa Railway and the beginning of the river's longest navigable stretch. Although the city already housed government offices, customs services, and courts, its primary purpose was initially to maintain communication between the colonial government and its overseas territories. The transfer of colonial services began in January with the headquarters of the colonial troops, followed by the agriculture and education services in July, the medical service in August, and the chief engineer's office and directorate-general of finance in September. The governor-general's cabinet moved in November, and the installation of all the governor-general's services in Kalina was completed in the first half of 1930.

Before transition, Léopoldville was an "urban district" that included Kintambo and Kalina, which developed around Ngaliema Bay, and as the city continued to develop, other communes, including Kinshasa, Barumbu, and Lingwala, were established and expanded. During the 1930s, these communes housed many employees of Chanic, Filtisaf, and Utex Africa. On 25 June 1941, Legislative Ordinance No. 293/AIMO granted Léopoldville city status and established an Urban Committee (Comité urbain) for an area of 5,000 hectares and a population of 53,000. The city also served as the colony's capital and the capital of the Congo-Kasaï province and the Moyen Congo district. It was divided into two zones: an urban zone comprising Léo II, Léo-Ouest, Kalina, Léo-I (Léo-Est), and Ndolo, and an indigenous zone (zone indigène) to the south. Following the end of forced labor in 1945, the urban population grew as Africans migrated from rural areas. The Kongo people thereafter became the city's predominant ethnic group.

During the 1950s, residential areas in Lemba, Matete, and part of N'djili were developed to house workers from the Limete industrial zone. The colony's first university, Lovanium University, opened in 1954. In 1957, Léopoldville contained 11 communes and six annexed zones. The communes included Kalamu, Dendale (now Kasa-Vubu), Saint Jean (now Lingwala), Ngiri-Ngiri, Kintambo, Limete, Bandalungwa, Gombe, Barumbu, Kinshasa, and Ngaliema. The six annexed zones were Lemba, Binza, Makala, Kimwenza, Kimbanseke, and Kingasani. N'djili and Matete were subsequently added as annexed zones.

After gaining its independence on 30 June 1960, following riots in 1959, the Republic of the Congo elected its first prime minister, Patrice Lumumba whose perceived pro-Soviet leanings were viewed as a threat by Western interests. This being the height of the Cold War, the U.S. and Belgium did not want to lose control of the strategic wealth of the Congo, in particular its uranium. Less than a year after Lumumba's election, the Belgians and the U.S. bought the support of his Congolese rivals and set in motion the events that culminated in Lumumba's assassination. In 1964, Moïse Tshombe decreed the expulsion of all nationals of Republic of the Congo, Burundi and Mali, as well as all political refugees from Rwanda. In 1965, with the help of the U.S. and Belgium, Joseph-Désiré Mobutu seized power in the Congo. He initiated a policy of "authenticité", attempting to renativize the names of people and places in the country. On 2 May 1966, the government announced that the nation's major cities would be restored to their pre-colonial names, effective on 30 June, the sixth anniversary of independence. Léopoldville was renamed Kinshasa, for a village named Kinshasa that once stood near the site. Kinshasa grew rapidly under Mobutu, drawing people from across the country who came in search of their fortunes or to escape ethnic strife elsewhere, thus adding to the many ethnicities and languages already found there.

=== Urban history ===
==== Colonial urban planning ====
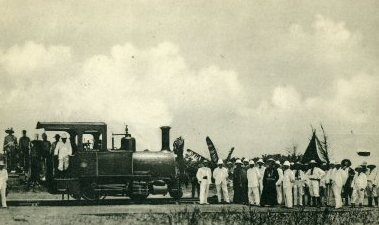
The arrival of the first locomotive in Léopoldville, Congo Free State, c. 1898

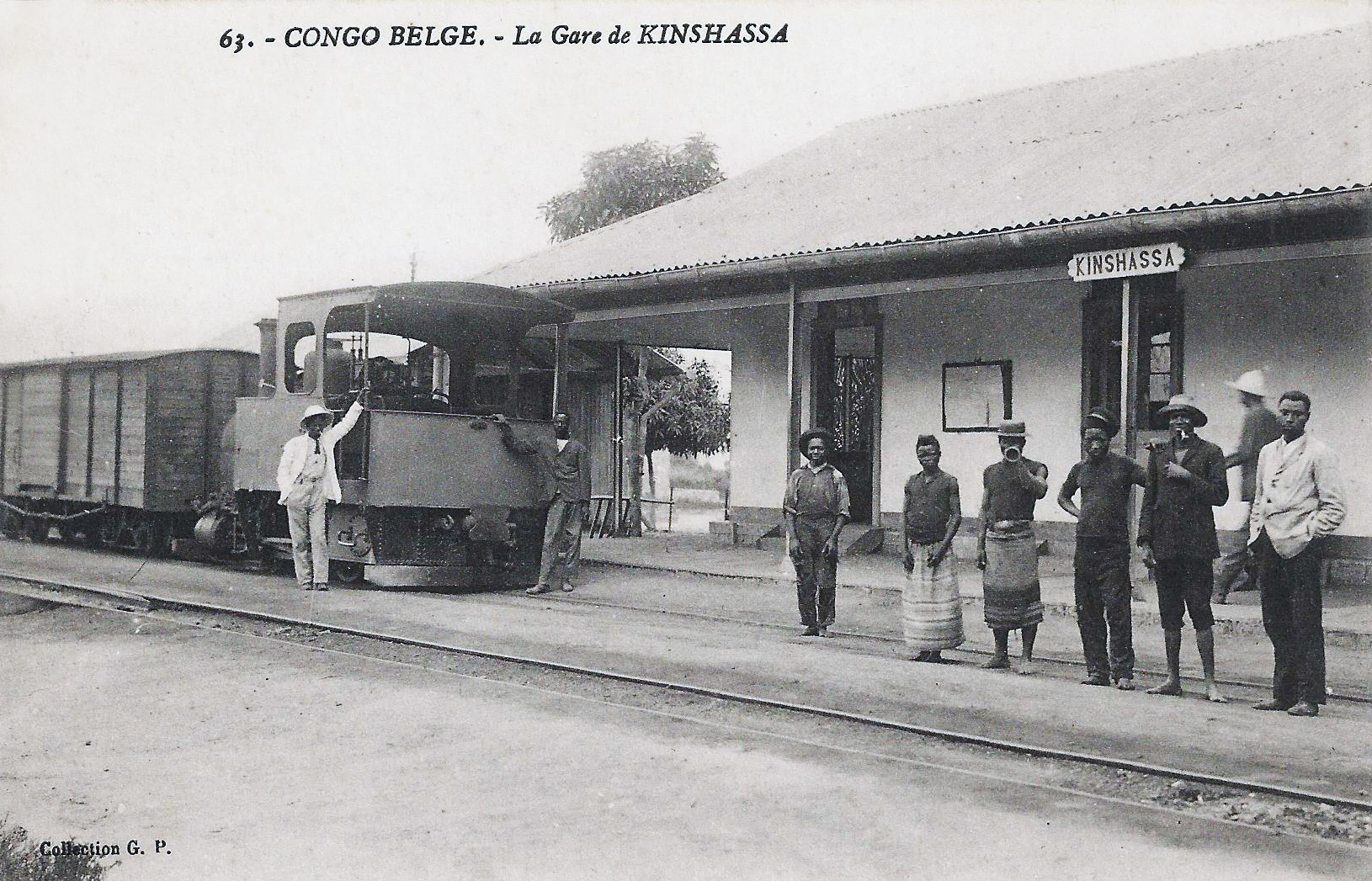
Photograph of Kinshasa Central Station, c. 1905

European urban planning began in 1881, with rigid planning principles to keep the city uncluttered and attractive. The construction of the Matadi–Léopoldville Railway began in 1890 and ended in 1911. The railway was seen as an important sign of colonial progress because it linked Léopoldville's port with the coastal city of Matadi. After its completion, prefabricated residences known as "Danish houses", imported from Belgium, were built around the station and gradually replaced the temporary tents used by early explorers, soldiers, and mercenaries. As Léopoldville became an administrative and military center, officials of the Congo Free State and later, after 1908, the Belgian Congo began settling there.

Europeans often worked as engineers, architects, carpenters, and builders, and were supported by mercenaries and trained African laborers, who were instrumental in the physical construction. By 1902, the Kintambo area was entirely occupied by European buildings. Attracted by employment and trade, residents of surrounding villages migrated to the city, where their expanding settlements gradually formed the earliest cités indigènes, which were residential areas designated for the African population.

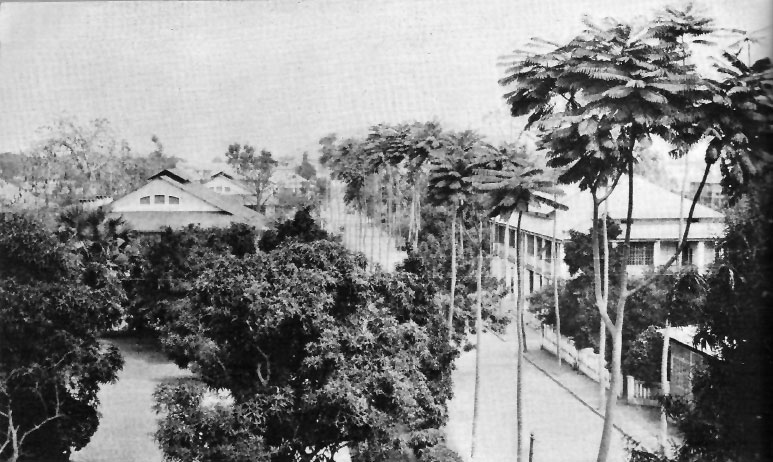
A 1942 view of Léopoldville from the balcony of the A.B.C. Hotel. Established in 1914, the A.B.C. Hotel was the city's first hotel complex, which was constructed by the Compagnie Commerciale et Agricole d'Alimentation du Bas-Congo (ABC), a subsidiary of the Compagnie du Congo pour le Commerce et l'Industrie (CCCI), which also oversaw the construction of the Matadi–Léopoldville Railway.

An eight-kilometer track connected Léopoldville (commonly referred to as "Léo") and Kinshasa but was often impassable during the rainy season. Transport included bicycles, a few private cars, and dromedaries, while public transport was scarce. In 1911, colonial administrator Georges Moulaert prepared an urban plan for Léopoldville and the surrounding Kinshasa area that guided development for decades. World War I stimulated local economic activity in the Belgian Congo, which experienced relative prosperity despite being largely cut off from Europe, as motorboats and trucks increasingly replaced canoes and porterage, and by 1918, Léopoldville had seized the interest of Belgian architects who viewed it as a site for experimenting with colonial urban planning. Colonial urbanization remained tightly controlled, and in 1922 a decree mandated that large companies provide housing for their African workers, a requirement that major firms such as Huileries du Congo Belge (HCB) met by building workers' camps, while smaller enterprises often failed to comply. The existing framework, governed by the decree on "the labor contract between natives and civilized masters", proved insufficient to meet growing housing demands, which then prompted religious missions to extend loans to African residents for self-construction before becoming overwhelmed, after which a special fund was established to provide interest-free loans for house construction using locally available materials.

==== Segregation ====
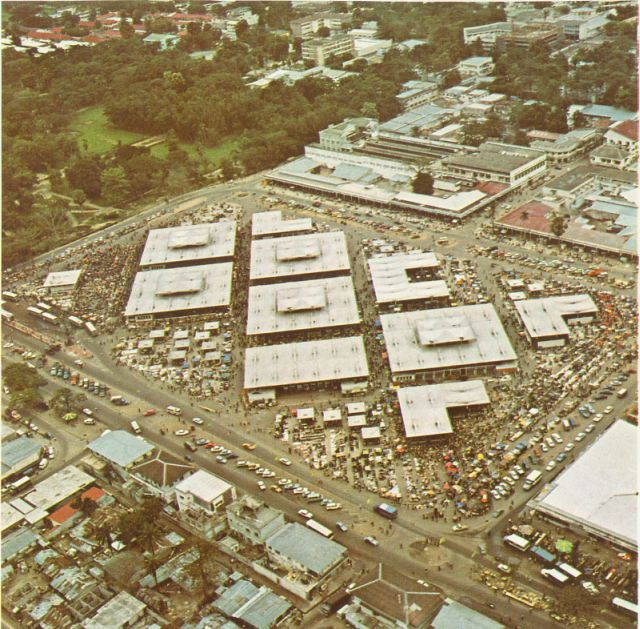
The Kinshasa Central Market was launched in January 1944 to serve the commercial needs of the African population as urban development and colonial segregation measures grew more pronounced.

Colonial authorities enforced a racially segregated urban model in which African residents were confined to separate indigenous quarters, known as cités indigènes, such as Léo I and Léo II. These zones were delineated by colonial authorities which allocated land in rudimentary grids and, lacking modern infrastructure such as sewers, were equipped only with basic sanitation facilities, typically simple pit latrines consisting of holes dug or drilled into the ground. During the 1920s, the urban growth brought the indigenous quarters into proximity with European residential areas, particularly near the Matadi–Kinshasa Railway and the Boulevard Albert 1er (now Boulevard du 30 Juin). This heightened European settlers' concerns about public health and urban hygiene, which prompted the Léopoldville Urban Committee in 1933 to establish a buffer known as the "neutral zone", which, although recommended to be 800 meters wide, was implemented at only 250 to 300 meters because of logistical constraints and exemptions granted to some Europeans living in the area. Known as Parc De Bock, now the Kinshasa Botanical Garden, this buffer was established by District Commissioner Fernand De Bock with agronomist Roeck and included the Kinshasa Zoological Garden, and served as a sanitary barrier and a leisure space for Europeans. The park also contained vegetable gardens tended by unemployed volunteers, while immediately south of the neutral zone lay the indigenous area, which encompassed key facilities such as Ndolo Airport, Kinshasa Central Market, Kinshasa General Hospital, a TSF wireless station, a golf course, a cemetery, and Camp Léopold II (now Camp Kokolo).

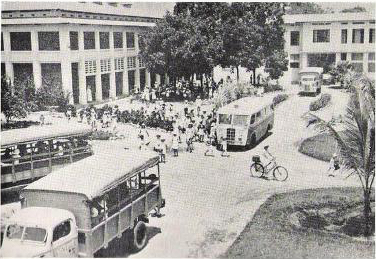
A busy city square in Léopoldville, 1943

Guided by the paternalistic ideology of the colonial "civilizing mission", Belgian authorities began providing formal housing for Africans, particularly urban workers, launching the Nouvelle Cité housing project after the Second World War on a 407-hectare site in Dendale (now Kasa-Vubu). It was overseen by the Service de la Population Noire and housed more than 8,000 residents by 1947, including future president Joseph Kasa-Vubu. To meet additional housing demand, the Office des Cités Africaines (OCA) began overseeing a ten-year plan in 1949 covering urban design, infrastructure, community facilities, and housing construction. By 1959, over 40,000 homes had been built following a controlled, segregationist approach, with planning initially led by urban planner Georges Ricquier and later taken over by Maurice Heymans in 1953, while the new city plan preserved European dominance over the historical center (La Gombe), limited expansion to adjacent zones, and promoted industrial development in Limete.

Post-1950s urban expansion arose due to the "sprawl of quartiers, the high demand for housing among the population, and the increasing distance between riverside employment zones and cités indigènes". Communes like Kasa-Vubu and Ngiri-Ngiri featured structured housing with proper streets, sanitation systems, twin houses, and single-level row buildings. Some housing areas were self-built but still regulated, with residents adhering to official layouts and construction guidelines based on their resources. Between 1954 and 1960, OCA developed Matete, Bandalungwa, and Lemba, alongside the satellite city of Ndjili. These included prearranged roads, drainage systems, sewer networks, and paved primary access routes.

For the first time, two-story houses and collective apartment buildings appeared, particularly in Bandalungwa, Matete, and Lemba. Kalamu followed with the expansion of Camp Kaouka and the 20 May neighborhood beyond the Funa River. Further east, across the Yolo River, residential development continued in Limete and its accompanying industrial zone.

=== Unrest in 1991 and the First Congo War ===
In 1991 the city had to fend off rioting soldiers, who were protesting the government's failure to pay them. Subsequently a rebel uprising began, which in 1997 finally brought down the regime of Mobutu.

The eruption of the First Congo War (1996–1997), closely tied to the aftermath of the 1994 Rwandan genocide, significantly intensified instability in Kinshasa and across the broader region. Following the genocide, the Rwandan Patriotic Front (RPF), under Paul Kagame, launched military operations into eastern Zaire, not only targeting Hutu insurgents but also committing large-scale violence against Hutu civilians. UNHCR consultant Robert Gersony estimated that between 5,000 and 10,000 people were killed monthly in mid-1994 alone. The influx of over two million Rwandan Hutu refugees into eastern Zaire further exacerbated security and humanitarian tensions, particularly in provinces such as South Kivu. President Mobutu's regime proved incapable of managing the crisis, thus facilitating the conditions for war. By 1996, foreign-backed militias, including the Rwandan Patriotic Army (RPA), the Ugandan People's Defence Force (UPDF), and Burundi's Forces Armées Burundaises (FAB), began supporting Congolese Tutsi groups such as the Banyamulenge. Belgian legal and political scholar Filip Reyntjens describes the First Congo War as the convergence of two overlapping goals: the genuine resistance of Congolese Tutsi, who feared retaliation, and the strategic use of this resistance by the Rwandan government to justify the RPA's military involvement in Zaire.

The fall of Kinshasa in May 1997 to the Rwandan- and Ugandan-backed Alliance des Forces Démocratiques pour la Libération du Congo (AFDL), led by Laurent-Désiré Kabila, was followed by widespread human rights abuses. AFDL and RPA forces carried out extrajudicial killings, acts of torture, rape, and targeted former regime officials as well as members of the elite Special Presidential Division (DSP). Between 18 and 22 May 1997, volunteer teams from the Congolese Red Cross collected between 228 and 318 bodies in Kinshasa and its outskirts and evacuated wounded civilians to local medical facilities. Reports from the United Nations Special Rapporteur and the United Nations Mapping Team indicate that the security situation deteriorated further between May and June 1997. During this period, AFDL and RPA units, often with the participation of civilians, carried out public executions, frequently incinerating the bodies in neighborhoods such as Masina, Matete, and Kingabwa (Limete commune). At the GLM (Groupe Litho Moboti) building, detainees, many of them former members of the Zairean Armed Forces (Forces Armées Zaïroises; FAZ) or political opponents, were routinely executed and their bodies discarded in the Congo River, a practice halted only after intervention by human rights advocates alerted by local fishermen. In September 1997, the security crisis in Kinshasa was compounded by cross-border shelling from Brazzaville. Armed factions involved in a separate conflict in Brazzaville launched artillery fire into Kinshasa between 29 September and 1 October, killing at least 21 civilians. In retaliation, FAC and RPA forces shelled Brazzaville for two consecutive days.

==== Systematic torture, detention conditions, and crackdowns on political opposition ====
In June and July 1997, detainees in military prisons at Kokolo and Tshatshi camps suffered ill-treatment that led to numerous deaths from torture, disease, and medical neglect. Reports from late 1997 indicate that at least 24 wounded former members of the Rwandan Armed Forces (Forces Armées Rwandaises, ex-FAR) disappeared after being transferred from hospitals to military camps, where they were subjected to threats and degrading treatment, while the militarization of Kinshasa's public life continued under the new regime, as units of the Congolese Air Force (Force Aérienne Congolaise, FAC) and the RPA, particularly the young child soldiers known as Kadogo, imposed harsh disciplinary measures on civilians, including public floggings and whippings with the chicotte, a "leather-thonged whipping device". These punishments often resulted in severe internal injuries and deaths due to internal bleeding.

Beginning in June 1997, the new authorities ordered ex-FAZ to undergo political re-education at Kitona military base in Bas-Congo (now Kongo Central), and in their absence, soldiers from the newly formed FAC and RPA occupied military camps in Kinshasa, including CETA and Tshatshi, where they raped large numbers of women and girls, many of whom were family members of ex-FAZ soldiers. Victims were often subjected to sexual slavery and forced domestic labor. At Kokolo Military Camp, similar atrocities happened, including gang rapes and the random abduction and assault of women in nearby quartiers, while at a location known as "Camp Américain", ferocious crimes were reported, such as the case of a girl who was gang-raped, tortured, and had hot wax poured over her genitals. Violence against women extended outside military compounds, as numerous reports from the period reveal that FAC and RPA soldiers carried out systematic sexual violence across Kinshasa, including against sex workers and women detained arbitrarily.

Opposition activists and their families were frequently subjected to harassment, arbitrary arrest, and torture. Women related to political figures were especially vulnerable to sexual violence during state crackdowns. Activists from major opposition parties such as the Parti Lumumbiste Unifié (PALU), Union pour la Démocratie et le Progrès Social (UDPS), and the Front pour la Survie de la Démocratie au Congo (FSDC) were frequent targets. In July 1997, FAC and RPA soldiers killed between one and four PALU members during a protest crackdown and injured several others. The residence of PALU leader Antoine Gizenga was ransacked, resulting in the death of an activist and the severe beating of six more. Documented cases of torture and rape continued into 1998. Notably, on 10 December 1997, two sisters of the FSDC president were gang-raped by FAC and RPA personnel. The FSDC leader himself, a former Mobutu loyalist, was arrested in February 1998 and subjected to torture while detained in the central prison and the Mikonga military training facility.

=== Second Congo War ===
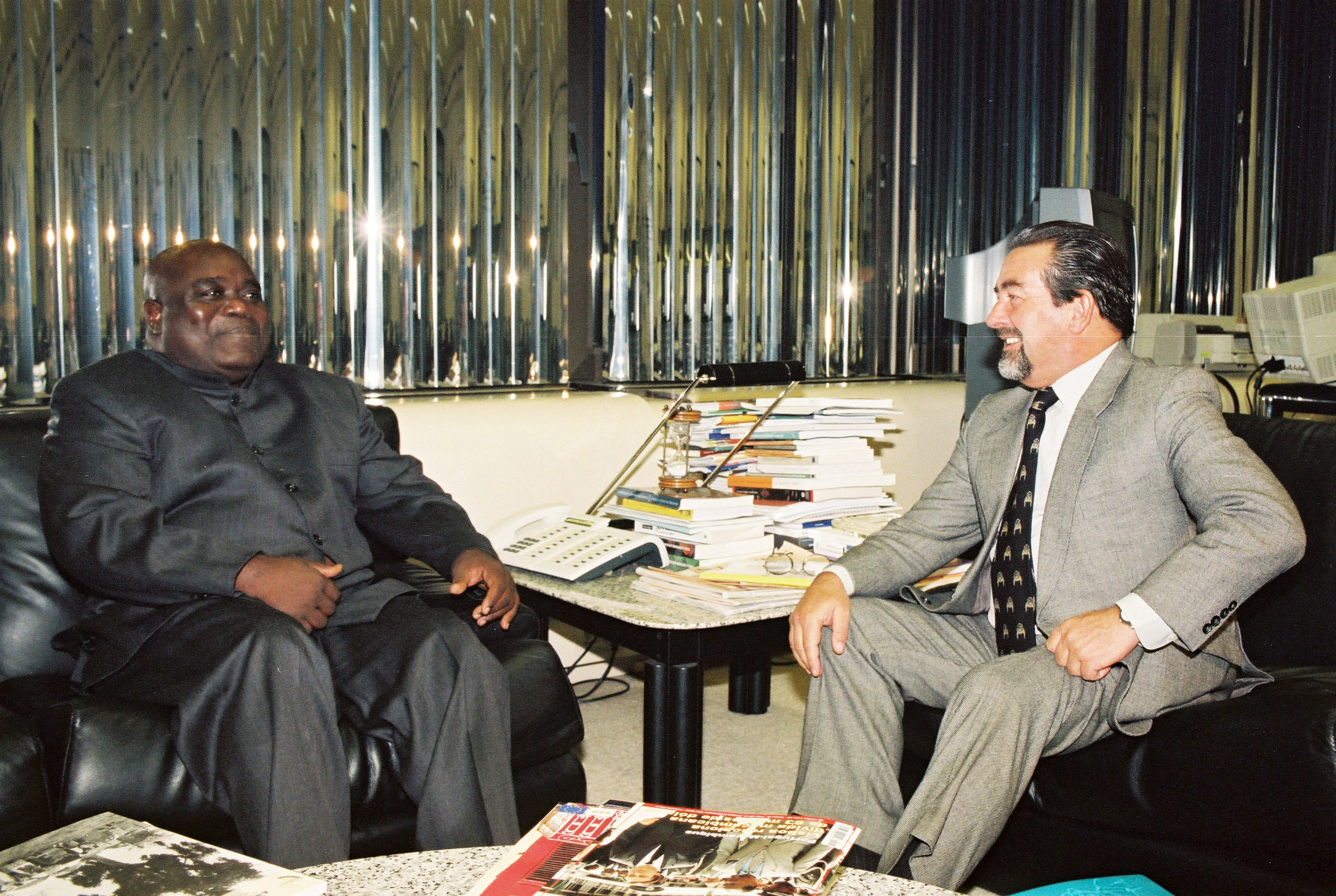
Visit of President Laurent-Désiré Kabila to João de Deus Pinheiro, the European Commissioner for Relations with Parliament, Culture, and Audiovisual, to discuss the armed conflict raging in the country, November 1998

The Second Congo War also plunged Kinshasa into a period of insecurity and military conflict after a dramatic breakdown in relations between President Laurent-Désiré Kabila and his former allies in Rwanda and Uganda, whom Kabila accused of undermining Congolese sovereignty and holding ambitions to carry out a coup d'état. Allegations also surfaced that the United States had provided indirect support to Rwanda during this period, including claims of military training by the Rwanda Interagency Assessment Team (RIAT), ostensibly to secure access to the DRC's vast mineral wealth. American individuals and institutions, such as Roger Winter of the U.S. Committee for Refugees and Immigrants, were further implicated in allegedly abetting insurgent activities. In response to these tensions, President Kabila dismissed Rwandan General James Kabarebe from his position as Chief of Staff and demanded the withdrawal of all Rwandan military personnel from Congolese territory. This move provoked a swift counteroffensive, as Rwanda and Uganda backed the formation of a new rebel group, the Rassemblement Congolais pour la Démocratie (RCD), which launched its rebellion from the city of Goma on 2 August 1998. The insurrection was spearheaded by mutinous units within the Congolese armed forces in coordination with Rwandan, Ugandan, and Burundian troops. Within weeks, RCD forces had captured large swathes of territory in the eastern and northern parts of the country, including regions of North and South Kivu, Orientale Province, North Katanga, and Équateur Province. Their advance toward Kinshasa and the western province of Bas-Congo was halted by military intervention from Angola and Zimbabwe, both of which deployed troops in support of Kabila's government.

This escalation led to the effective partition of the DRC, as Kabila's administration, reinforced by military contingents from Angola, Zimbabwe, Namibia, Chad, and Sudan, retained authority over the western and central regions. Conversely, the eastern part of the country fell under the control of the RCD's military wing, the Armée Nationale Congolaise (ANC), which was supported by Rwandan, Ugandan, and Burundian forces. In response, Kabila aligned with a range of non-state actors and militias, notably the Mayi-Mayi as well as Rwandan and Burundian Hutu rebel groups including the Forces pour la Défense de la Démocratie (FDD) and the Armée de Libération du Rwanda (ALiR), the latter composed in part of former members of the Rwandan Armed Forces and the Interahamwe militia. Uganda, while occupying substantial portions of Orientale Province, simultaneously sponsored the establishment of the Mouvement pour la Libération du Congo (MLC), under the leadership of Jean-Pierre Bemba, to administer the Ugandan-controlled regions of Équateur. Diverging strategic interests between Uganda and Rwanda eventually led to a split within the RCD itself, giving rise to two rival factions: the Rwanda-aligned RCD–Goma and the Uganda-supported RCD–ML. Despite their military superiority, these rebel coalitions faced persistent challenges in exerting full administrative and security control over rural areas, where they were met with sustained resistance from local militias, interethnic hostility, and community mistrust.

By late August 1998, forces of the ANC, RPA, and UPDF clashed with troops from FAC and the Zimbabwe Defence Forces (ZDF) for control of the capital. The ZDF employed heavy artillery to bombard densely populated areas, including Kimbanseke, Masina, Ndjili, and the Kingatoko village, which located near the Bas-Congo border. These attacks resulted in the deaths of approximately 50 civilians and left 282 wounded during the night of 27 to 28 August, leading to mass displacement as residents fled to safer parts of the city, while the ZDF's indiscriminate use of heavy weapons struck hospitals, religious buildings, and other non-combatant infrastructure without differentiating between military and civilian targets. In some instances, Congolese military authorities exacerbated civilian casualties by ordering residents to remain in their homes. On 28 August, in Mont-Ngafula, FAC soldiers brutally murdered two Red Cross volunteers, one by crushing his skull, as they tried to rescue victims in Mitendi and Mbenseke, which left several others injured. Rebel forces also targeted critical infrastructure, including the Inga hydroelectric power station in Bas-Congo, which was seized by ANC, RPA, and UPDF troops on 13 August 1998 and had its turbines stopped for three weeks, cutting electricity and water to Kinshasa and parts of Bas-Congo and severely disrupting hospitals.

==== Human rights abuses, crackdowns on Cabindan separatists, and Joseph Kabila's rise to power ====
Political opponents and civilians were subject to extrajudicial executions, torture, rape, and arbitrary detentions. Between August 1998 and January 2001, approximately 50 incident reports were submitted to the United Nations Commission on Human Rights and its mechanisms, including the Working Groups on arbitrary detention and enforced disappearances, and the Special Rapporteurs on torture and extrajudicial killings. Members of opposition parties such as the UDPS and PALU were particularly targeted, often detained in notorious facilities including the Police d'intervention rapide (PIR), the Direction des renseignements généraux et services spéciaux (DRGS, also called Kin Mazière), IPKIN (ex-Circo), and Kokolo Military Camp. A major crackdown happened on 28 October 2000, when President Kabila's security forces arrested at least 93 people, including 60 soldiers and 33 civilians from North Kivu, South Kivu, and Maniema, accused of plotting a coup d'état involving Anselme Masasu Nindaga, a founding AFDL member; some detainees were summarily executed or tortured to death, while others were imprisoned for over three years and only released following a government-issued general amnesty. In line with its military alliance with Angola, the Kinshasa government also targeted members of the Front for the Liberation of the Enclave of Cabinda (FLEC), a separatist movement seeking independence for the Angolan province of Cabinda, shutting down FLEC offices in Kinshasa between 1998 and 1999, arresting numerous Cabindan militants, many of whom were tortured, forcibly transferred to Angola, or remain missing.

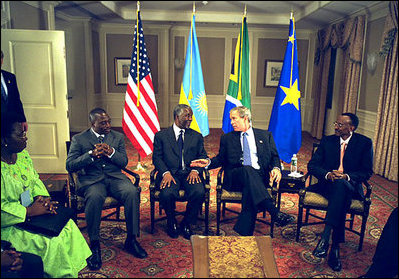
George W. Bush meets with Joseph Kabila (left), Thabo Mbeki of South Africa (center), and Paul Kagame of Rwanda (right) at the Waldorf Astoria New York.

After the assassination of President Laurent-Désiré Kabila on 16 January 2001, his son and successor, Joseph Kabila, was quickly installed as president and prioritized the de-escalation of armed conflict and the promotion of national reconciliation, particularly through the organization of the Inter-Congolese Dialogue (ICD), which brought together government representatives, rebel movements, opposition parties, and civil society in a comprehensive peace process. In March 2001, the United Nations Mission in the Democratic Republic of Congo (MONUC) deployed personnel to key conflict zones to monitor compliance with the Lusaka Ceasefire Agreement, yet violence continued, particularly in North and South Kivu, where clashes involved groups such as the Mayi-Mayi militias, FDD, ALiR, and ANC. The ICD officially opened on 25 February 2002 in Sun City, South Africa, and a preliminary power-sharing agreement was signed on 19 April 2002 between Joseph Kabila and Jean-Pierre Bemba, though it faced opposition from RCD-Goma and parties including the UDPS. Progress continued with a major diplomatic breakthrough on 30 July 2002, when Rwanda and the DRC signed a peace accord in Pretoria, agreeing that Rwanda would withdraw its troops in exchange for the disarmament and repatriation of Hutu militias such as the FDLR, followed by a similar agreement with Uganda in Luanda on 6 September 2002 to withdraw Ugandan forces and stabilize Ituri Province.

By year's end, foreign troops from Rwanda, Uganda, Zimbabwe, Angola, and Namibia had begun withdrawing, a move that culminated in the Global and All-Inclusive Agreement in Pretoria on 17 December 2002, which established a transitional power-sharing government and integrated former belligerents into a unified national army. Despite ongoing challenges, the process advanced with the ICD ratifying the agreement on 1 April 2003 in Sun City, along with a memorandum on transitional governance and armed group integration, and transitional institutions were formally inaugurated on 30 June 2003. Nevertheless, President Kabila, who remained in power until 2019, faced persistent opposition in Kinshasa, with his controversial victory in the 2006 presidential election triggering widespread unrest that prompted the deployment of European Union forces to support MONUSCO in maintaining order, and another unrest emerged in 2016 when the Independent National Electoral Commission announced a two-year delay in holding new presidential elections, a decision that ignited mass protests in September and December marked by street barricades, violent clashes, and a high civilian death toll.

== Geography ==
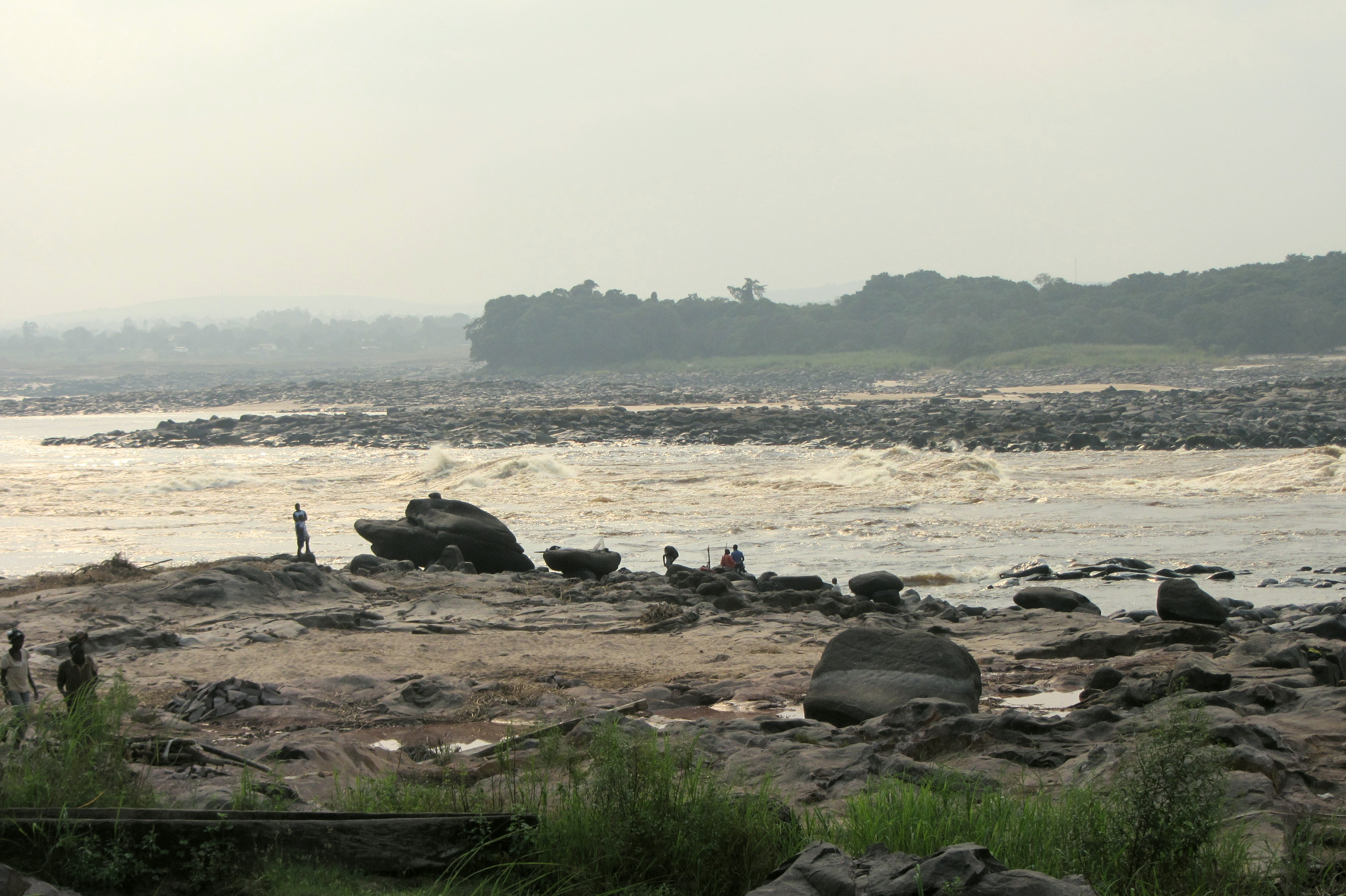
Dawn at the banks of the Congo River in Ngaliema commune

Satellite view of Kinshasa (south of the Congo River) and Brazzaville (north of the river)

=== Location ===
Kinshasa is situated on the southern shore of Pool Malebo, a widening of the Congo River. The city-province covers 9,965 square kilometers, while its central urban area occupies a broad crescent of relatively flat, low-lying terrain at an average elevation of about 300 meters. It is bordered to the east by the provinces of Mai-Ndombe, Kwilu, and Kwango, to the south by Kongo Central, and to the north and west by the Congo River, which forms the natural boundary with the Republic of the Congo.

The Congo River, Africa's second-longest river after the Nile, has the continent's highest discharge and serves as a critical transportation route across much of the Congo Basin, with river barges navigable between Kinshasa and Kisangani and along several tributaries. It is also a significant source of hydroelectric power, with the potential downstream of Kinshasa to generate electricity sufficient for roughly half of Africa's population.

=== Relief ===
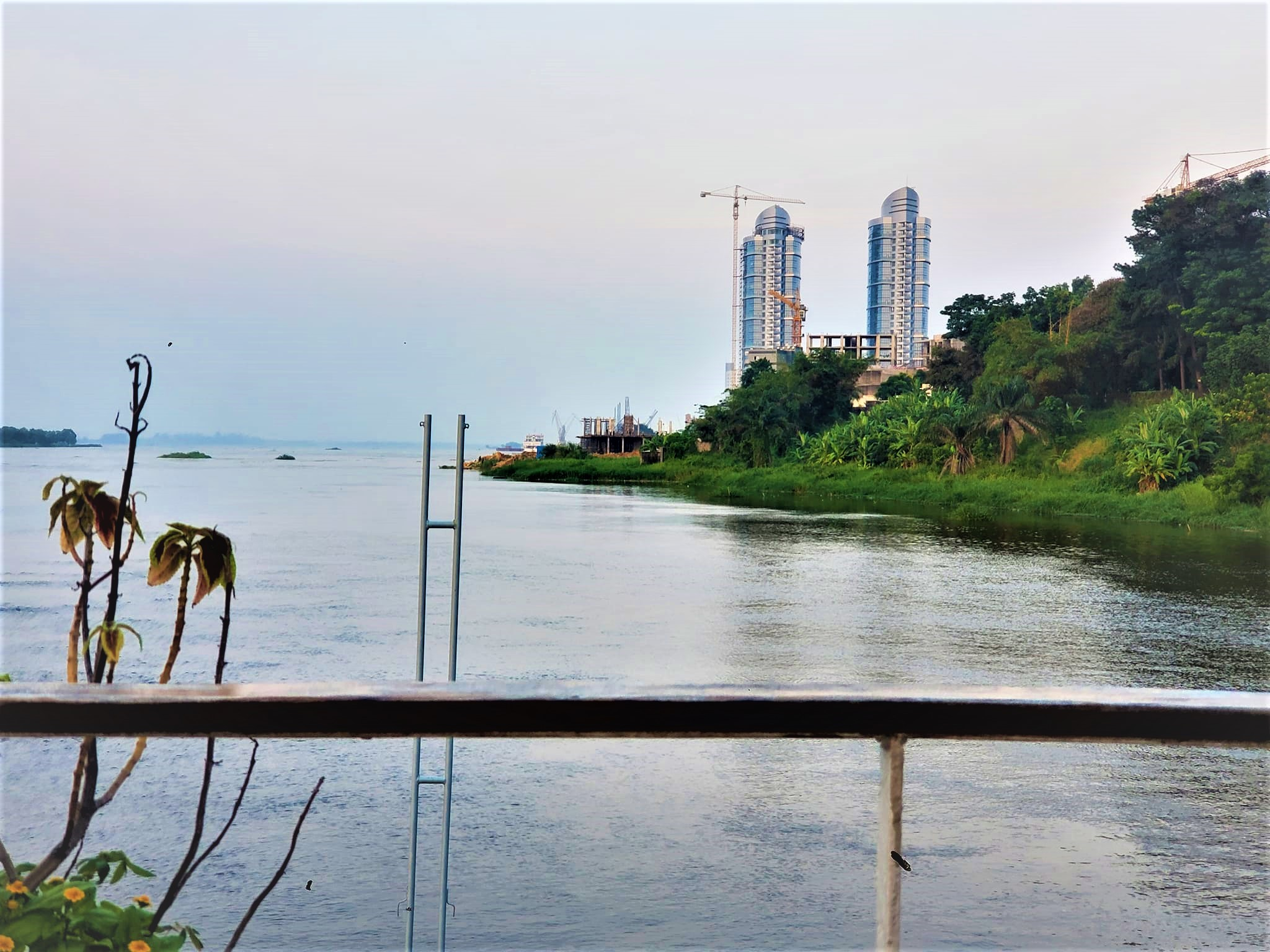
A view of Congo River from Kinshasa

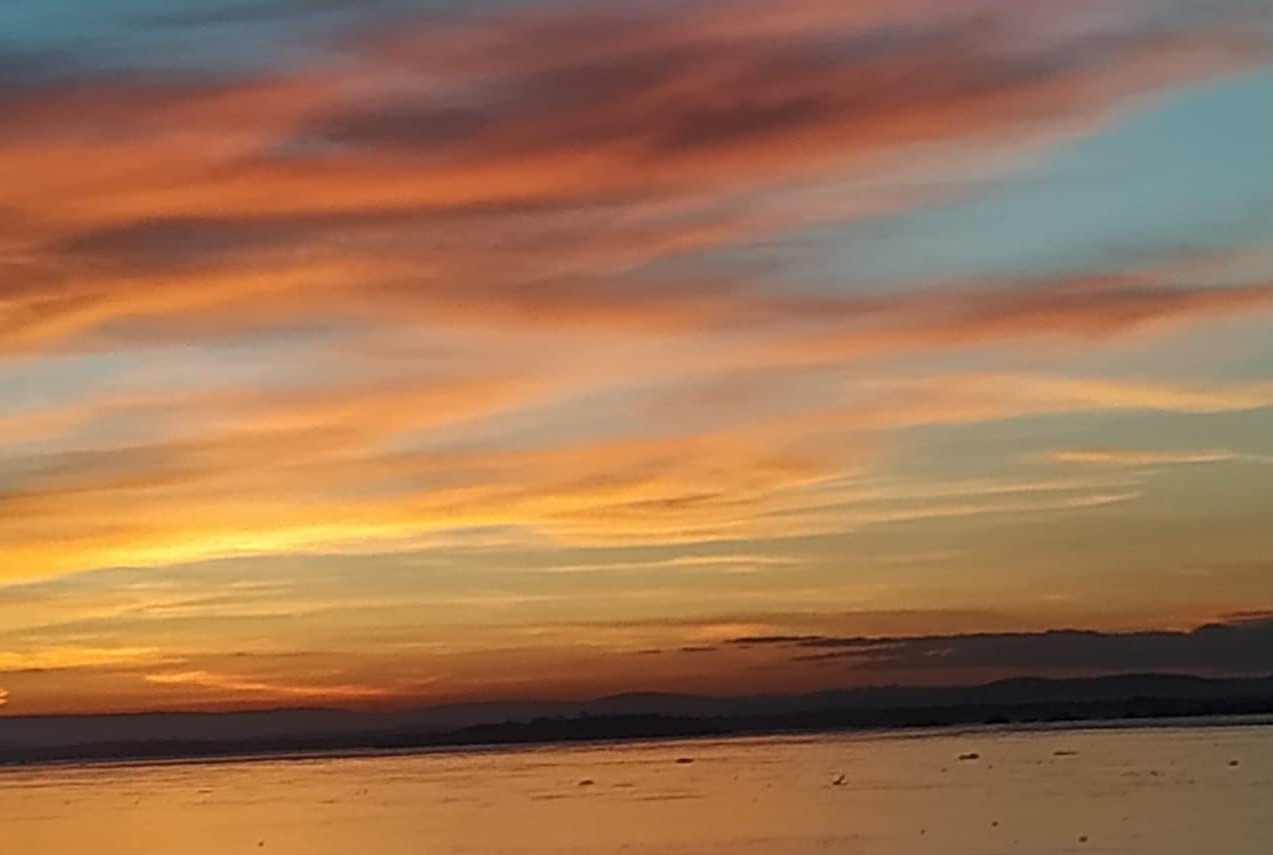
Sunset by the Congo River in Kinshasa

Kinshasa has a marshy, alluvial plain, with altitudes ranging from 275 to 300 meters, along with hilly terrain that elevates from 310 to 370 meters. It has four principal features: the Malebo Pool, a large water body with islands and islets; the Kinshasa Plain, a highly urbanizable area prone to drainage problems; the terrace, a series of low ridges overlooking the plain; and the hills area, marked by deep valleys and cirque-shaped formations.

The Malebo Pool extends roughly 35 kilometers long and 25 kilometers wide, bordered by Ngaliema in the west and Maluku in the east, and passes through other communes including Gombe, Barumbu, Limete, Masina, and Nsele. The Kinshasa Plain has a banana-like shape and is surrounded by eastward-oriented hills. Comprising mainly sandy alluvial deposits, this plain covers an area of about 20,000 hectares and hosts some of the city's most densely populated and urbanized communes, such as Limete, Kalamu, Bandalungwa, Ngiri-Ngiri, Kinshasa, Barumbu, and Lingwala. Despite its urban potential, the plain is highly vulnerable to seasonal flooding and waterlogging due to inadequate drainage infrastructure, with recurrent inundation occurring during the rainy season.

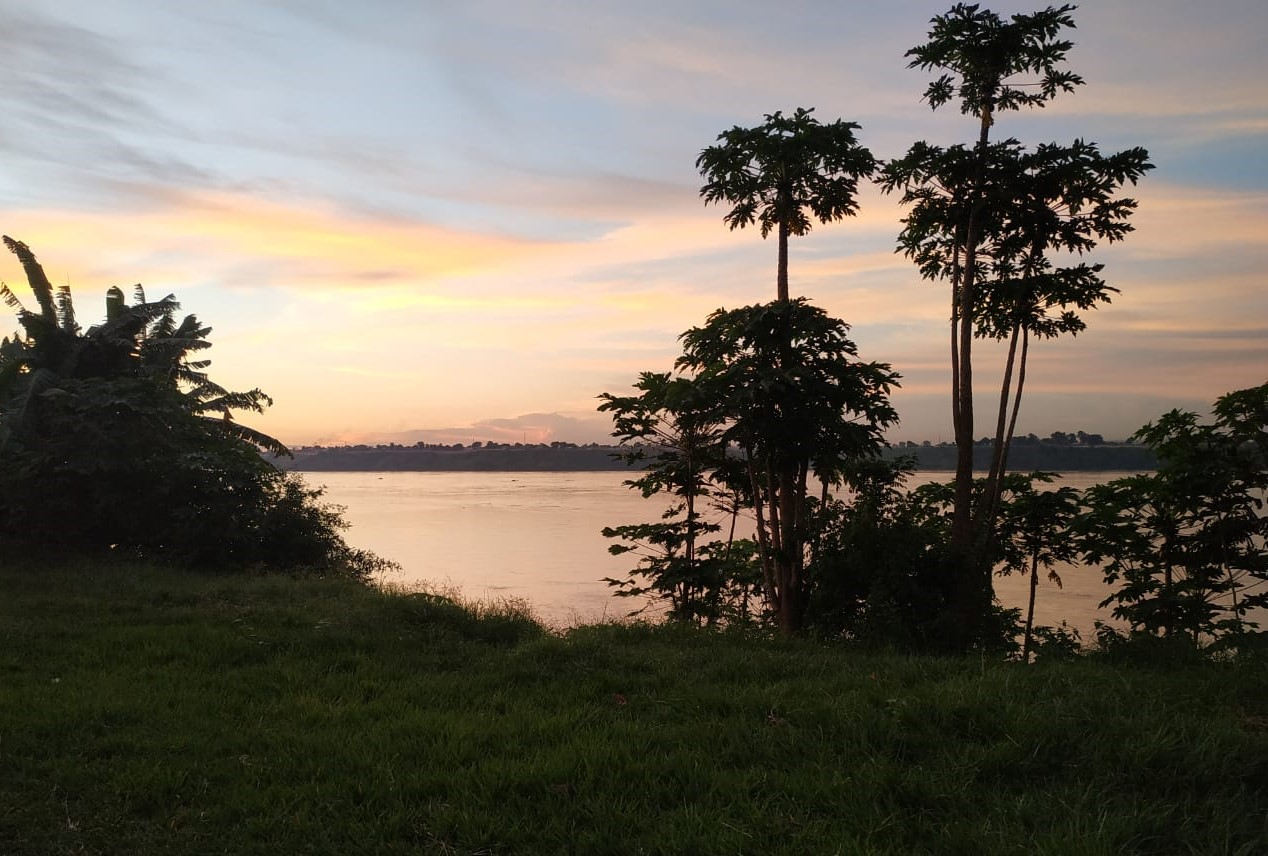
Sunset along the banks of the Congo River in Kinshasa

The terrace is mainly situated in the city's western expanse, between N'djili and Mont-Ngafula. It comprises stony blocks of soft sandstone and silica-covered yellow clay, topped with brown silt, and ranges from 10 to 25 meters in height. It retains vestiges of an ancient surface. The hills area commences several kilometers from the Malebo Pool and is characterized by deep valleys and cirque-shaped formations. These hills reach heights surpassing 700 meters and exhibit gentle, rounded contours sculpted by local rivers. While their eastern counterparts may reflect remnants of the Batéké Plateau, their origins in the west and south remain enigmatic. This region forms a natural amphitheater shaped by river erosion processes, which have been exacerbated by anthropogenic activities, often resulting in significant environmental degradation. Communes located within or adjacent to these hilly areas include Mont-Ngafula, Bumbu, Selembao, Kisenso, and Ngaliema. In addition, Makala and Ngaba, although partially located within the plains, gradually ascend into the adjacent highlands.

=== Hydrography ===
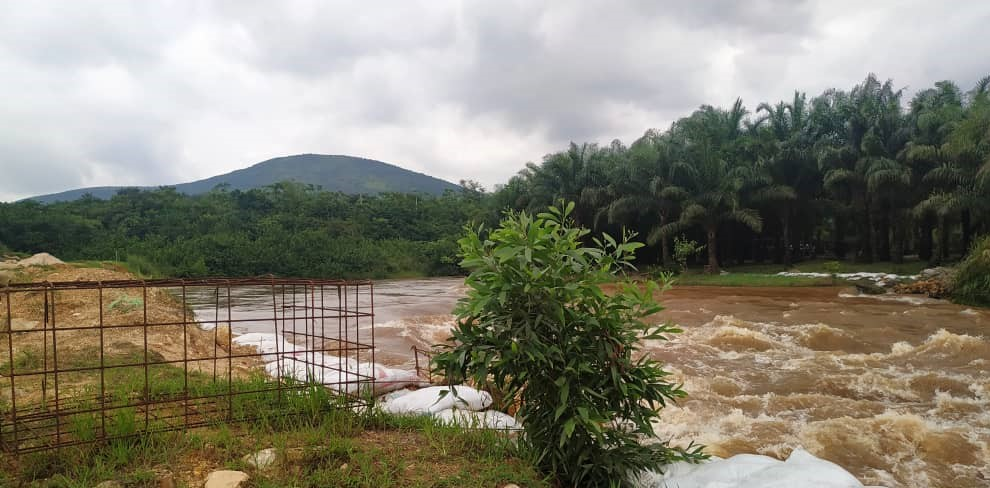
Nsele River

Kinshasa's hydrographic landscape is defined by an intricate and predominantly dendritic network of rivers and valleys that converge toward Pool Malebo. This fluvial system, which predominantly flows from the southern and southwestern highlands toward the north and northeast, is shaped by the region's topographical gradient and its underlying lithological structure. The city's current hydrological dynamics are the cumulative result of long-term tectonic shifts, sedimentary processes, and climatic variability that have defined the development of river systems over geological time scales.

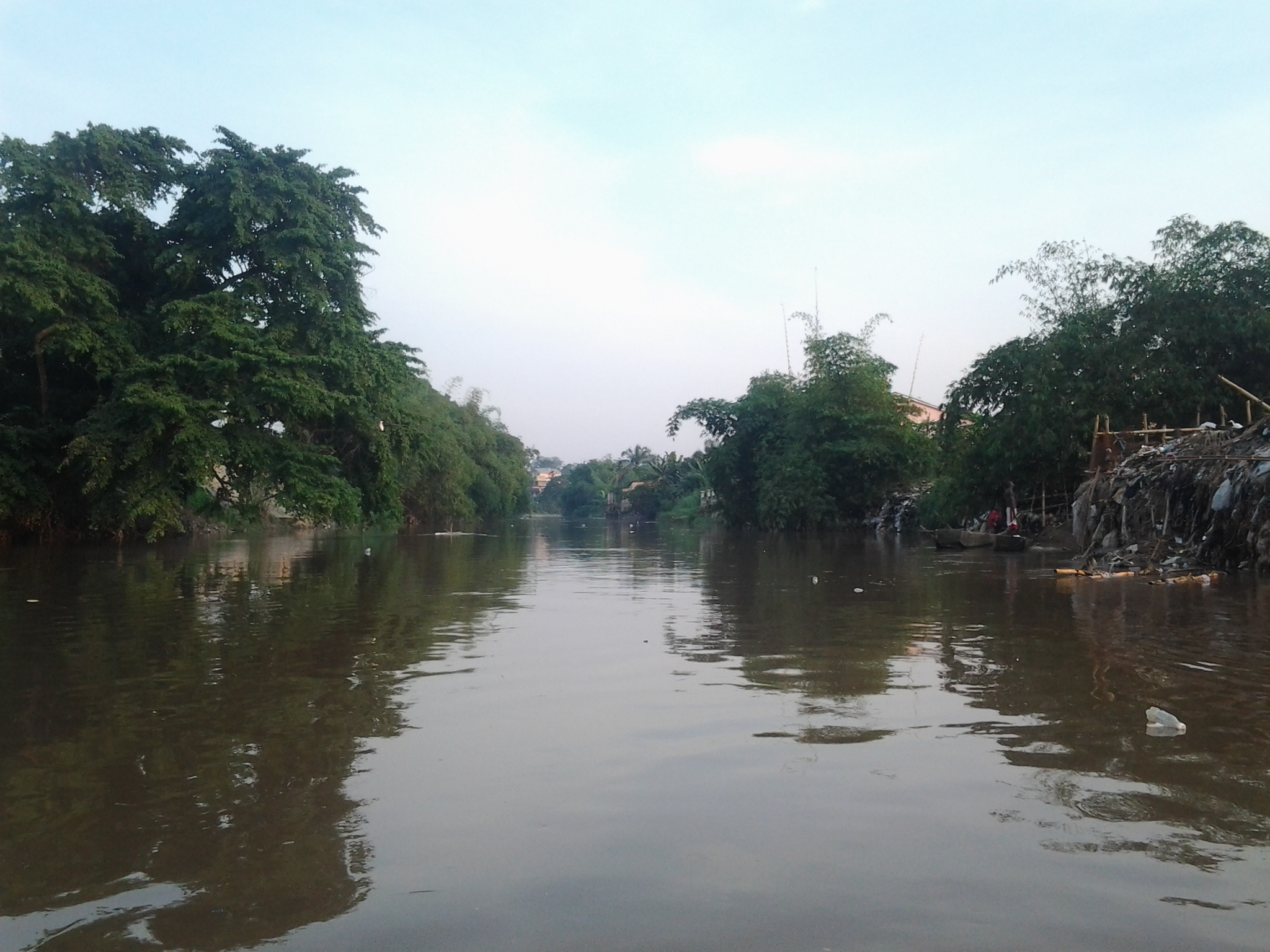
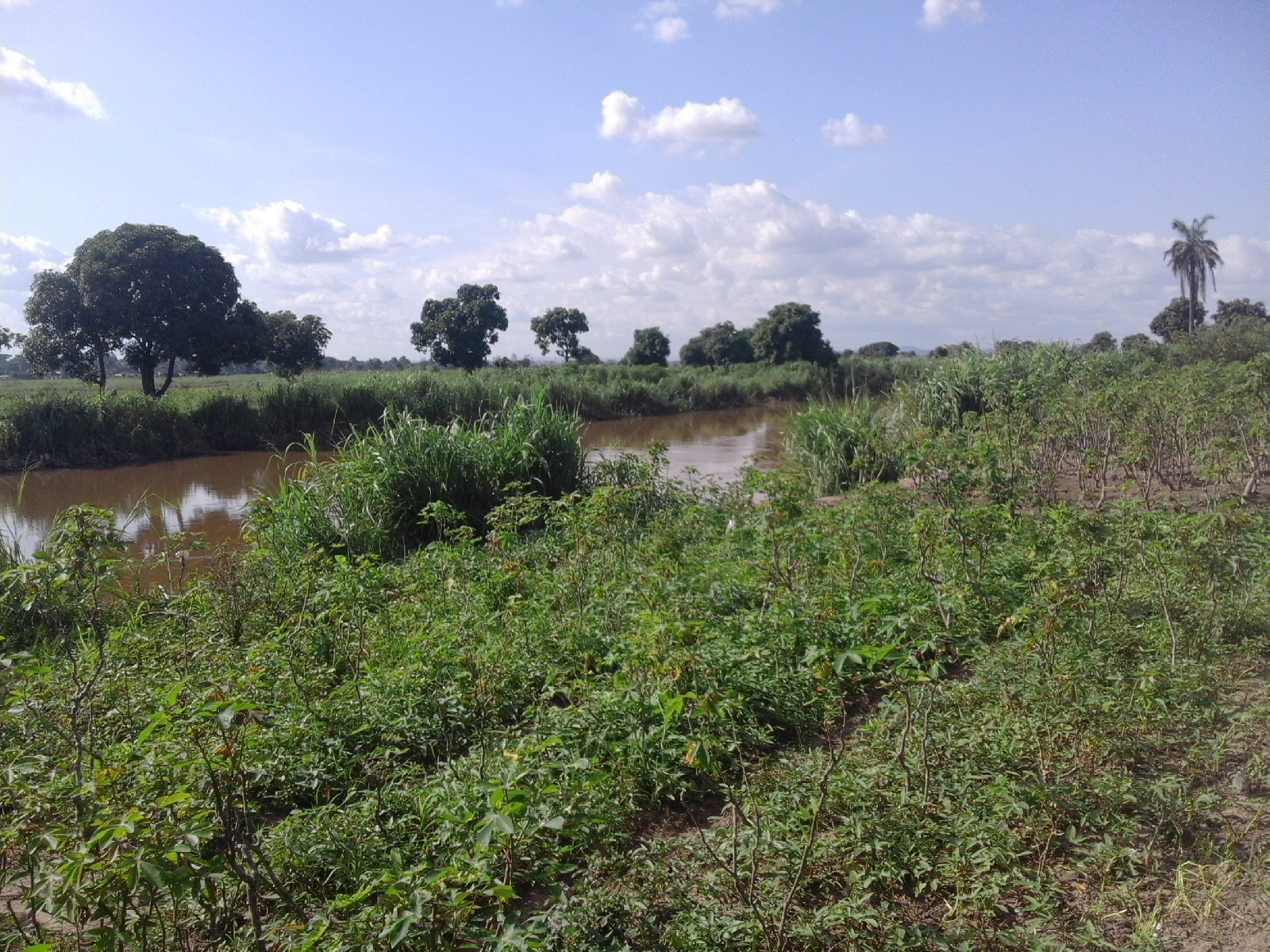
Ndjili River

The hydrographic system is composed of two main categories of rivers: allochthonous (originating outside the city) and autochthonous (local or internal to the city). The allochthonous rivers, which include the N'djili, N'sele, and the Pool Malebo, form the city's eastern and northern boundaries. These rivers have their sources far beyond the city's southern hills and generally flow in a south-to-north direction. The N'djili River, in particular, is prone to recurrent seasonal flooding in its lower reaches, frequently disrupting critical infrastructure. In contrast, the autochthonous rivers, such as the Funa, Lukunga, Bombo, Mai-Ndombe, and Mbale, are generated from localized watersheds scattered throughout the urban area. These rivers often carve deeply incised valleys, especially in the elevated southern regions. The Funa River is commonly but inaccurately referred to as the Kalamu, a misnomer derived from the Teke-Humbu term for "watercourse".

==== Geomorphology ====
The current hydrographic network overlays an ancient system, likely dating back to the Tertiary period, which originally drained from south to north but was subsequently modified by tectonic deformation following the late Cretaceous peneplanation. These geodynamic changes reoriented some rivers east–west in the eastern parts of the Congo Basin and west–east in the west. Traces of this paleonetwork persist in the form of broad, flat-bottomed valleys known as dambos or dembos, which emerged during the Holocene epoch. Characterized by diffuse channels and lacking pronounced riverbeds, these depressions often remain waterlogged throughout the year due to the persistent upwelling of the groundwater table. In recent centuries, however, increased hydrological stress, marked by heightened peak runoff, has induced the incision of more distinct channels within these formerly marshy landscapes. This hydrological transformation is evidenced by a marked rise in surface runoff and a reduction in infiltration retention, resulting in flashier hydrographs, more frequent flood events, and accelerated erosional processes. Recent studies estimate Kinshasa's runoff coefficient has increased to approximately 13%, a stark contrast to the near-zero levels before urban expansion and land-use change.

==== Aquifers and water table ====
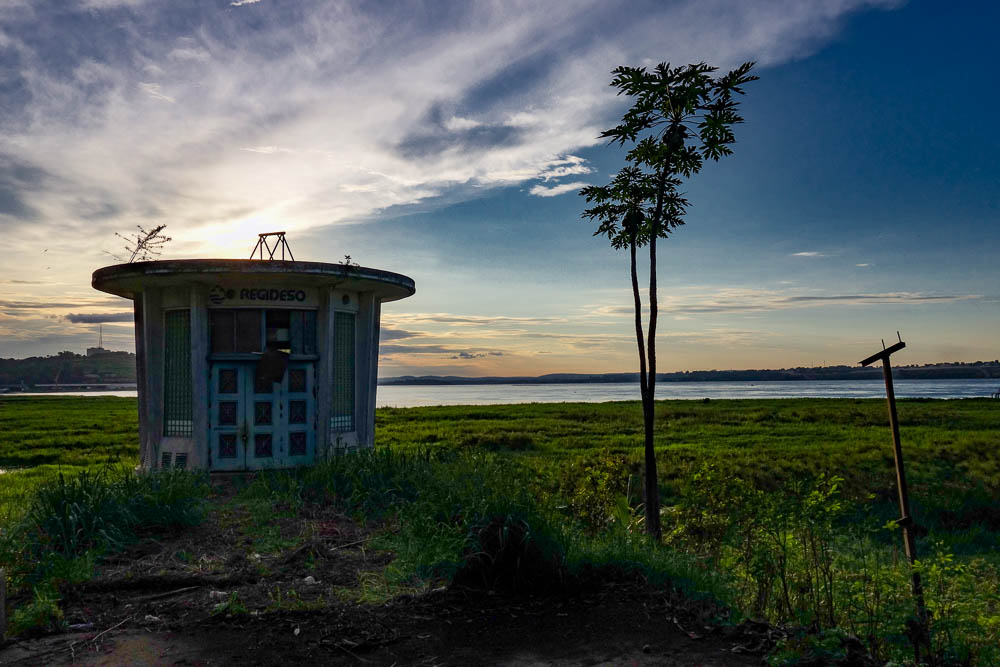
A view of Congo River from Kinshasa

Closely connected to the surface drainage network are the city's groundwater systems, particularly the perched aquifers found in its permeable sandstone substratum. These aquifers, often extending beyond the limits of their corresponding surface catchments, are sustained by deep percolation facilitated by the sandy and porous characteristics of the regional soils. During the dry season, rivers are primarily fed by these underground aquifers, which are recharged during the rainy season. Early seasonal rains are absorbed into the soil and do not contribute to surface runoff until the retention threshold is surpassed, at which point excess water seeps downward to replenish groundwater reserves. The region's high soil permeability also facilitates the formation of erosion cirques, particularly on steep slopes where groundwater undercutting and concentrated surface runoff progressively destabilize hillsides, often culminating in landslides. These geomorphic hazards have become increasingly pronounced in the city's rapidly urbanizing fringe zones, where informal settlement expansion, deforestation, and inadequate land-use planning intensify environmental vulnerability.

=== Soil and geology ===
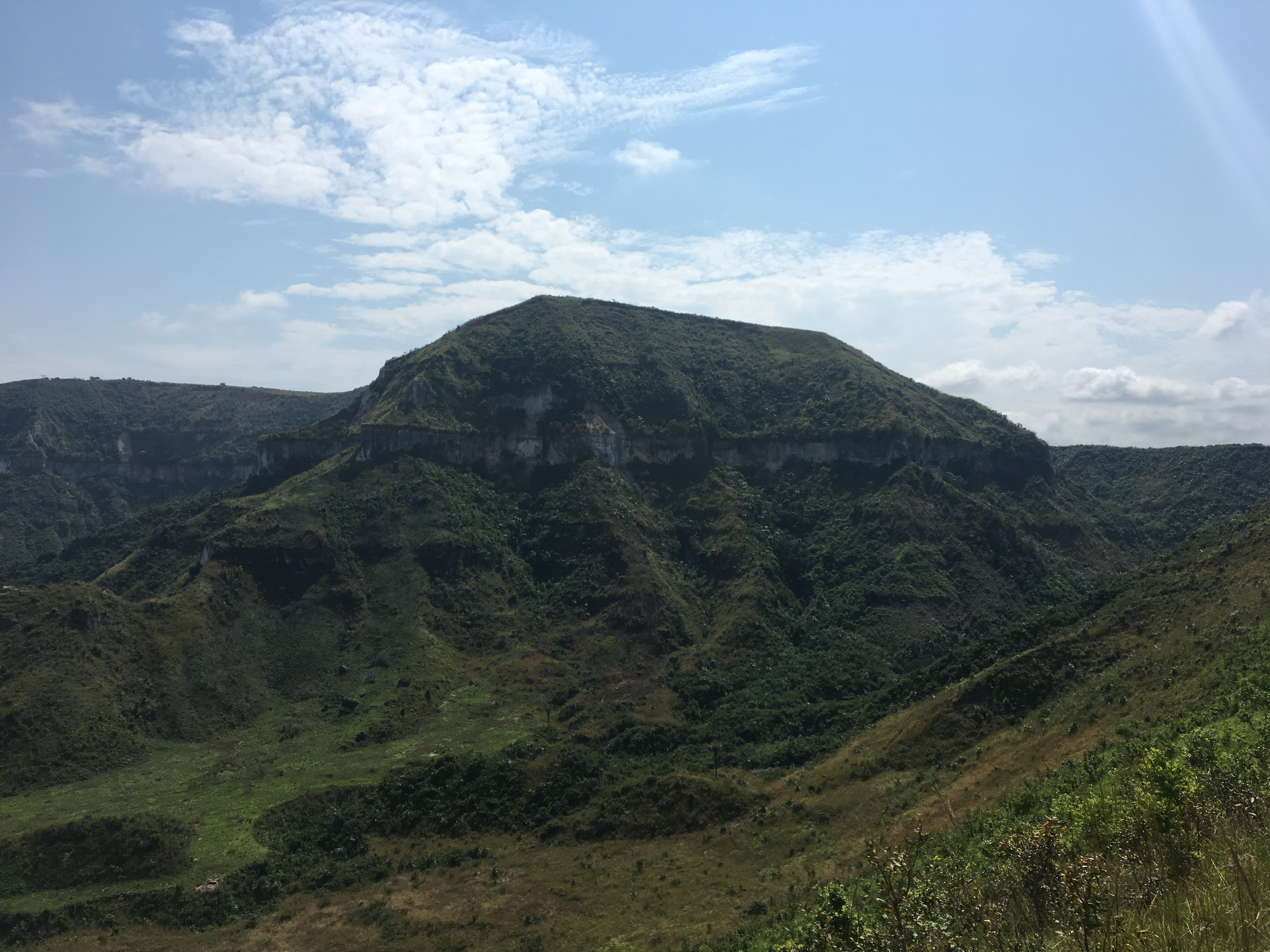
Mount Mangengenge is located southeast of Kinshasa

The city's soils predominantly belong to the Arenoferrasol classification, characterized by fine-textured sands with clay content typically below 20%, low organic matter, and saturated absorbent complexes. These soils has a strong acidity and are chemically deficient. Despite their limited nutrient availability, they experience regular rainfall for approximately eight to nine months annually, resulting in significant leaching and intense hydrolysis of soil minerals. This extended exposure to precipitation adversely affects soil fertility and agricultural potential.

Geologically, Kinshasa is situated on a Precambrian basement complex, mainly composed of finely stratified red sandstone that often contains feldspar, visible at the base of the rapids near Mount Ngaliema and south of the N'djili River, where the rock shows strong resistance to erosion.

The soil is shaped by these geological variations: schisto-limestone formations, along with older lithologies associated with the West-Congolian Orogeny, generate yellow, clay-rich soils that are largely sterile and exhibit low permeability proportional to their sand content, while schist-sandstone and clay-limestone substrata produce yellow to light brown clayey sands with slightly better permeability but minimal fertility. Fertile soils are primarily located within alluvial and colluvial deposits, where sediment accumulation enhances nutrient content and moisture retention.

In elevated terrains and along the slopes of deeply incised valleys, hydric erosion actively reshapes the schist-sandstone relief and ancient massifs. In these areas, soils are predominantly grayish sandy or clay-sandy in texture. In lower-lying regions, a distinctive local material known as Lemba sand is prevalent, although certain pockets of clay-sandy soils yield improved crop outcomes.

=== Vegetation ===
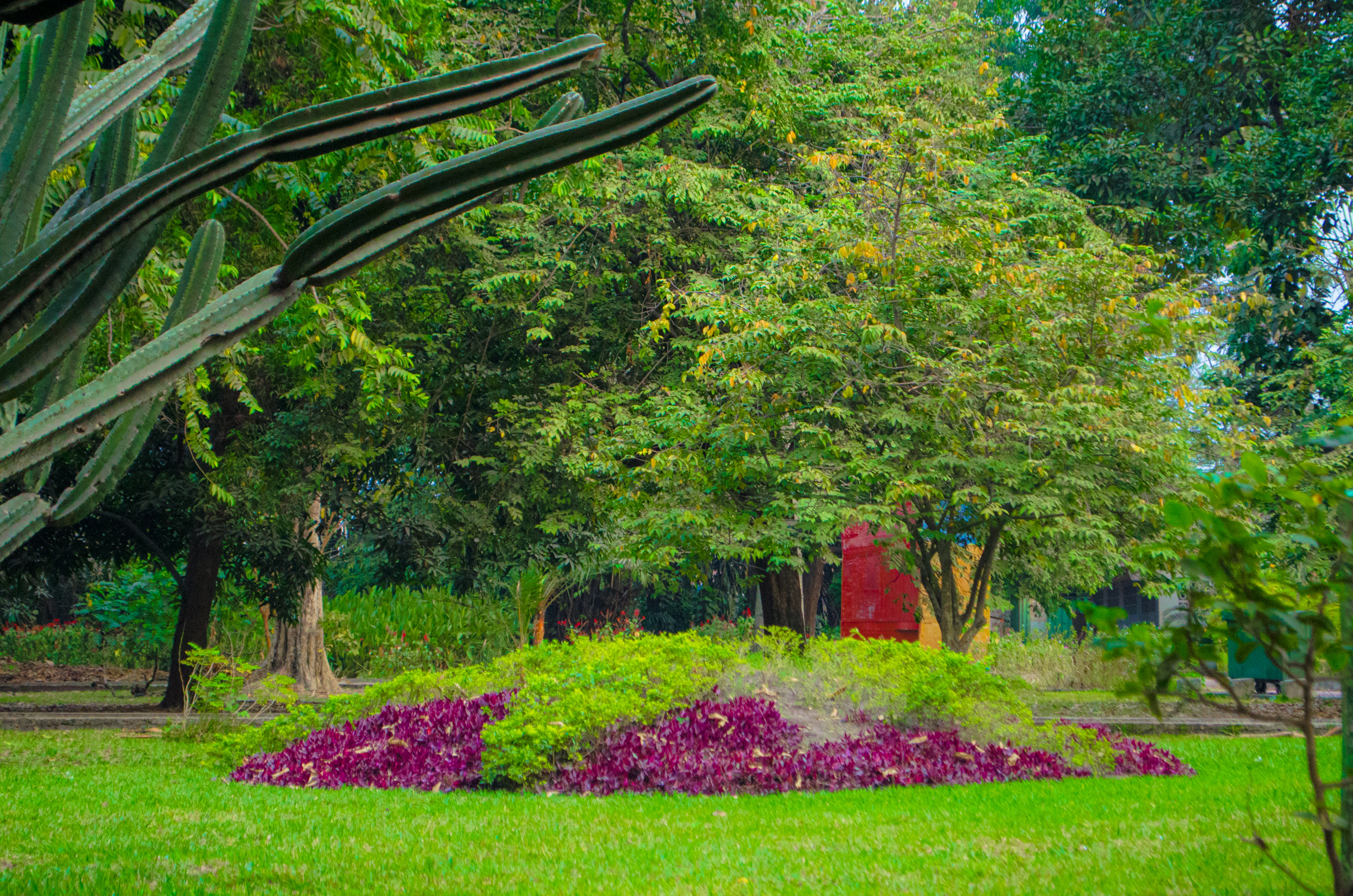
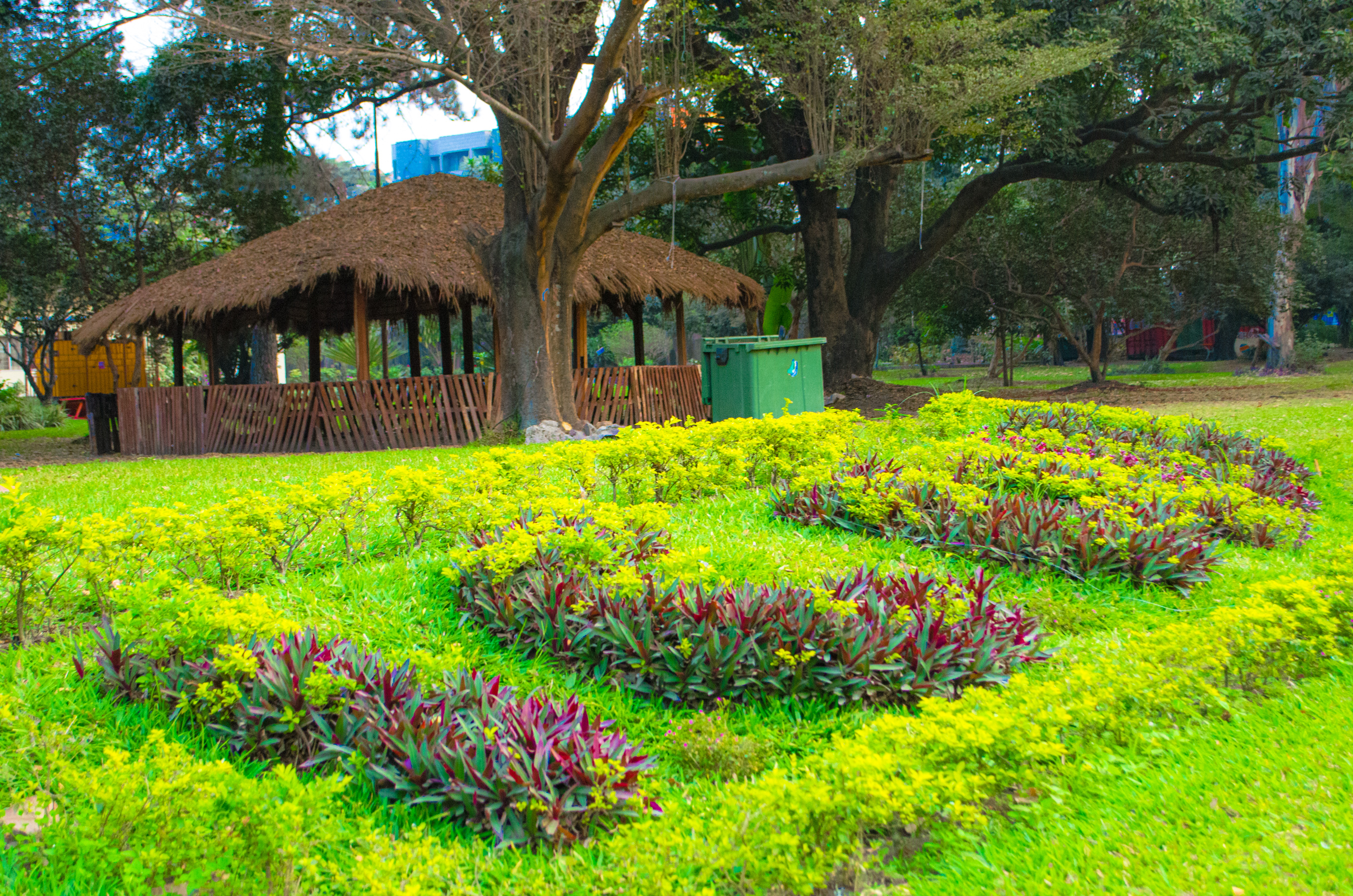
Kinshasa Botanical Garden

Vegetation consists of gallery forests, savannas, and semi-aquatic to aquatic plant communities, particularly within the valleys surrounding the Pool Malebo. The hilly zones of the region were originally dominated by grassland species, notably Loudetia demeusei and Schizachyrium semiberbe, which are characteristic tufted hemicryptophytes. However, the natural vegetation has undergone substantial transformation due to anthropogenic influences, most notably urban sprawl. As the city expanded, inhabitants introduced a range of fruit-bearing trees and ornamental plants, often cultivated as living hedges.

The gallery forests, typically aligned along principal watercourses and occupying humid valleys associated with the Guineo-Congolese ombrophile-type, have experienced progressive degradation. These once-continuous forest belts have been reduced to fragmented pre-forest fallows, consisting of secondary growths of varying maturity and structure. Historical vegetation mapping reveals that Kinshasa's forest cover declined significantly over the latter half of the 20th century: from 46% in 1960 to 36% in 1982, and plummeting further to just 15% by 1987. In parallel, the coverage of forest–savanna mosaics and terrestrial grassland formations expanded, rising from 48% in 1960 to 56% in 1982, and reaching 64% by 1987. In contrast, areas dominated by aquatic and swamp vegetation remained relatively stable throughout this period.

=== Residential and commercial areas ===
Kinshasa is a city of sharp contrasts, with affluent residential and commercial areas and three universities alongside sprawling slums. The older and wealthier part of the city (ville basse) is located on a flat area of alluvial sand and clay near the river, while many newer areas are found on the eroding red soil of surrounding hills. Older parts of the city were laid out on a geometric pattern, with de facto racial segregation becoming de jure in 1929 as the European and African neighborhoods grew closer together. City plans of the 1920s–1950s featured a cordon sanitaire or buffer between the white and black neighborhoods, which included the central market as well as parks and gardens for Europeans.

Urban planning in post-independence Kinshasa has been limited. The Mission Française d'Urbanisme drew up some plans in the 1960s which envisioned a greater role for automobile transportation but did not predict the city's significant population growth. Thus much of the urban structure has developed without guidance from a master plan. According to UN-Habitat, the city is expanding by eight square kilometers per year. It describes many of the new neighborhoods as slums, built in unsafe conditions with inadequate infrastructure. Nevertheless, spontaneously developed areas have in many cases extended the grid street plan of the original city.

=== Administrative divisions ===
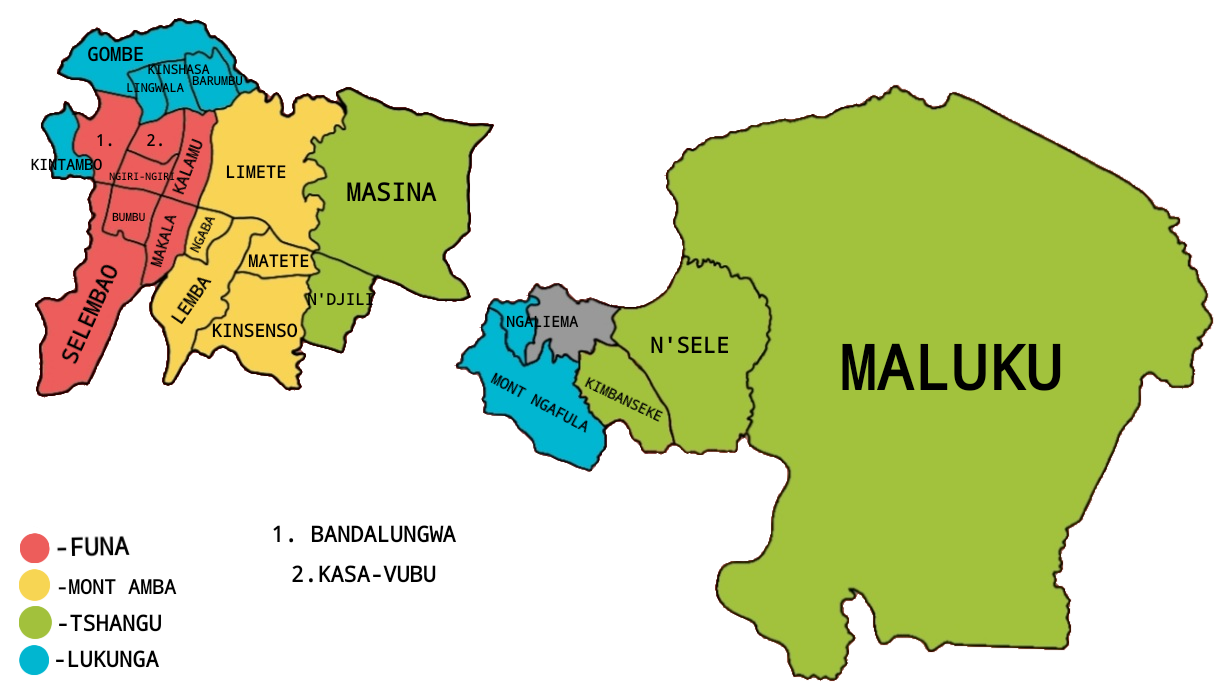
A map of Kinshasa presenting its Communes

Kinshasa is both a city (ville in French) and a province, one of the 26 provinces of the Democratic Republic of the Congo. Nevertheless, it has city subdivisions and is divided into 24 communes (municipalities), which in turn are divided into 369 quarters and 21 embedded groupings. Maluku, the rural commune to the east of the urban area, accounts for 79% of the 9,965 km^{2} (3,848 sq mi) total land area of the city-province, with a population of 200,000–300,000. The communes are grouped into four districts which are not in themselves administrative divisions.

- Funa District
  - Bandalungwa
  - Bumbu
  - Kalamu
  - Kasa-Vubu
  - Makala
  - Ngiri-Ngiri
  - Selembao
- Lukunga District
  - Barumbu
  - Gombe
  - Kinshasa
  - Kintambo
  - Lingwala
  - Mont Ngafula
  - Ngaliema
- Mont Amba District
  - Kisenso
  - Lemba
  - Limete
  - Matete
  - Ngaba
- Tshangu District
  - Kimbanseke
  - Maluku
  - Masina
  - Ndjili (N'Djili)
  - Nsele (N'Sele)

The 24 communes of Kinshasa

Abbreviations : Kal. (Kalamu), Kin. (Kinshasa), K.-V. (Kasa-Vubu), Ling. (Lingwala), Ng.-Ng. (Ngiri-Ngiri)

=== Climate ===
Under the Köppen climate classification, Kinshasa has a tropical wet and dry climate (Aw). Its lengthy rainy season spans from October through May, with a relatively short dry season, between June and September. Kinshasa lies south of the equator, so its dry season begins around its winter solstice, which is in June. This is in contrast to African cities further north featuring this climate where the dry season typically begins around December. Kinshasa's dry season is slightly cooler than its wet season, though temperatures remain relatively constant throughout the year.

Climate data for Kinshasa (N'djili Airport), elevation 309 m (1,014 ft), (1991–2020 normals, extremes 1999–present)
Month	Jan	Feb	Mar	Apr	May	Jun	Jul	Aug	Sep	Oct	Nov	Dec	Year
Record high °C (°F)	35.5 (95.9)	36.5 (97.7)	37.0 (98.6)	37.0 (98.6)	37.0 (98.6)	35.5 (95.9)	33.4 (92.1)	35.2 (95.4)	35.8 (96.4)	36.0 (96.8)	36.0 (96.8)	36.4 (97.5)	37.0 (98.6)
Mean daily maximum °C (°F)	31.1 (88.0)	32.0 (89.6)	32.7 (90.9)	32.7 (90.9)	31.5 (88.7)	29.0 (84.2)	28.2 (82.8)	29.3 (84.7)	30.8 (87.4)	31.4 (88.5)	31.3 (88.3)	30.7 (87.3)	30.9 (87.6)
Daily mean °C (°F)	26.1 (79.0)	26.4 (79.5)	26.7 (80.1)	26.3 (79.3)	25.9 (78.6)	23.8 (74.8)	23.4 (74.1)	24.2 (75.6)	25.6 (78.1)	26.0 (78.8)	25.8 (78.4)	25.6 (78.1)	25.5 (77.9)
Mean daily minimum °C (°F)	22.7 (72.9)	22.5 (72.5)	22.7 (72.9)	22.4 (72.3)	22.6 (72.7)	20.9 (69.6)	19.7 (67.5)	20.2 (68.4)	21.7 (71.1)	22.3 (72.1)	22.4 (72.3)	22.3 (72.1)	21.9 (71.4)
Record low °C (°F)	18.0 (64.4)	14.5 (58.1)	16.4 (61.5)	14.5 (58.1)	15.0 (59.0)	17.2 (63.0)	15.0 (59.0)	15.6 (60.1)	17.6 (63.7)	15.5 (59.9)	19.0 (66.2)	16.2 (61.2)	14.5 (58.1)
Average precipitation mm (inches)	163 (6.4)	165 (6.5)	221 (8.7)	238 (9.4)	142 (5.6)	9 (0.4)	5 (0.2)	2 (0.1)	49 (1.9)	98 (3.9)	247 (9.7)	143 (5.6)	1,482 (58.4)
Average precipitation days	12	12	14	17	12	1	0	1	6	10	16	14	115
Average relative humidity (%)	83	82	81	82	82	81	79	74	74	79	83	83	80
Mean monthly sunshine hours	136	141	164	153	164	144	133	155	138	149	135	127	1,739
Source 1: Starlings Roost Weather
Source 2: Danish Meteorological Institute (precipitation, sun, and humidity)

=== Parks and gardens ===
Kinshasa is home to a diverse range of parks and gardens:

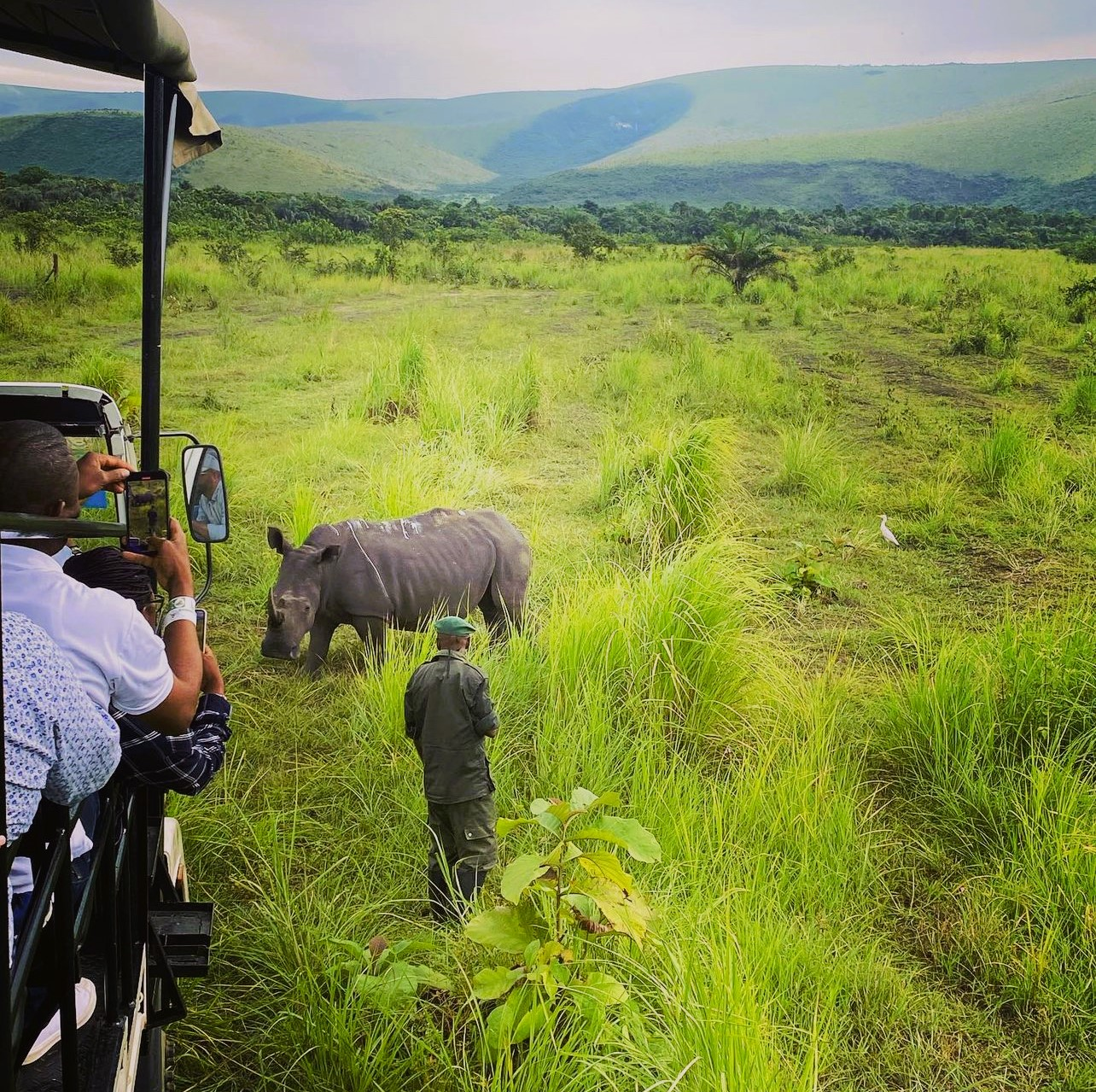
Nsele Valley Park, Kinshasa, October 2021

- Nsele Valley Park is the largest urban park in the city.
- Parc Présidentiel, situated along the Congo River, is a park that offers ponds, pools, and fountains, while the Théâtre de Verdure serve as venues for cultural performances.
- Jardin Zoologique houses a variety of mammals, reptiles, and birds.
- Jardin Botanique de Kinshasa is a botanical garden that houses various plants.
- Lola ya Bonobo is the world's only sanctuary for orphaned bonobos.

== Demographics ==
=== Population ===
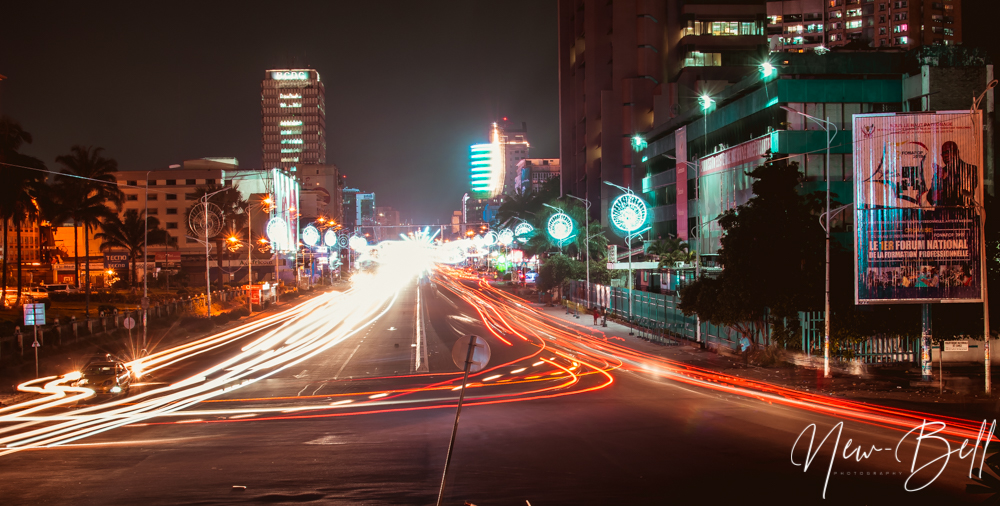
Night view of Kinshasa along Boulevard du 30 Juin

Kinshasa is the most populous city in the Democratic Republic of the Congo, with its metropolitan area estimated at around 18,552,800 people as of January 2026, making it the nation's most densely populated city, Africa's third-largest metropolitan area, and the fourth-most populous capital in the world.

Its population rose from 5,000 in 1889 to 10,000 in 1910 and 39,530 in 1930, with an annual rise of roughly 4,700 people. Between 1935 and 1945, the growth rate rose from 1.1% to 1.5% annually due to wartime economic mobilization, and the 1940s saw the population expand from 50,000 to more than 200,000. By the time Congo gained independence in 1960, Kinshasa covered 5,500 hectares and had 400,000 residents. Subsequent decades saw increased urban migration, conflict-related displacements, and a 3.8% annual growth rate, bringing the population to 2.6 million in 1984, 5.3–7.3 million in 2005, and nearly 12 million by 2015.

2015 demography
Communes	Land area (in km^{2})	Population	Density (inh. per km^{2})
Kimbanseke	237.8	2,631,205	11,066
Ngaliema	224.3	2,025,942	9,032
Masina	69.7	1,571,124	22,532
Ndjili	11.4	1,157,619	106,721
Kisenso	16.6	1,157,619	69,736
Lemba	23.7	1,120,992	47,299
Selembao	23.2	1,038,819	44,815
Limete	67.6	1,330,874	15,294
Kalamu	6.6	974,669	146,787
Bumbu	5.3	905,943	170,933
Matete	4.9	854,908	175,186
Mont Ngafula	358.9	718,197	2,001
Makala	5.6	698,495	124,731
Bandalungwa	6.8	934,821	93,082
Ngaba	4	539,135	134,784
Maluku	7.948	494,332	62
Ngiri-Ngiri	3.4	481,110	141,503
Kinshasa	2.9	453,632	158,060
Kasa-Vubu	5	437,824	86,870
Barumbu	4.7	413,628	87,633
Nsele	898.8	387,790	431
Kintambo	2.7	340,260	125,096
Lingwala	2.9	277,831	96,469
Gombe	29.3	89,080	3,037
Metropolitan Kinshasa	9.965	12,000,066	1,200

According to United Nations Human Settlements Programme, the city receives an average of 390,000 new migrants annually, with many fleeing conflict or economic hardship. A 2017 projection anticipated that Kinshasa's metropolitan population will reach 35 million by 2050, 58 million by 2075, and 83 million by 2100, making it one of the largest projected urban areas on the planet.

==== Ethnic groups and migration ====
Kinshasa's early inhabitants included the Humbu, Teke, and Bamfununga, alongside the Yaka and Banunu Bobangi from Kongo Central and the river-trading Bayanzi. These groups made up most of the population when Henry Morton Stanley arrived at Pool Malebo, and later trade opportunities attracted other groups, including the Lari from the Republic of the Congo and the Zombo from Angola. These newcomers built villages on Humbu land, including Mikwa, Ngabwa, Ndolo, and Mfumo, some of which later grew into larger settlements. The Teke, who were "neither particularly trade-oriented nor warlike, were welcomed onto Humbu lands because the Humbu feared harassment from neighboring riverine populations". Disputes broke out when chief Ngaliema ceded Humbu land to Stanley without consulting its traditional owners, which, according to Shomba et al., showed that the Teke did not hold the same landownership rights as the Humbu and Bamfunuga. As settlement around Pool Malebo expanded and Kinshasa grew, people from other parts of Congo, West Africa, Europe, and Asia arrived in search of work.

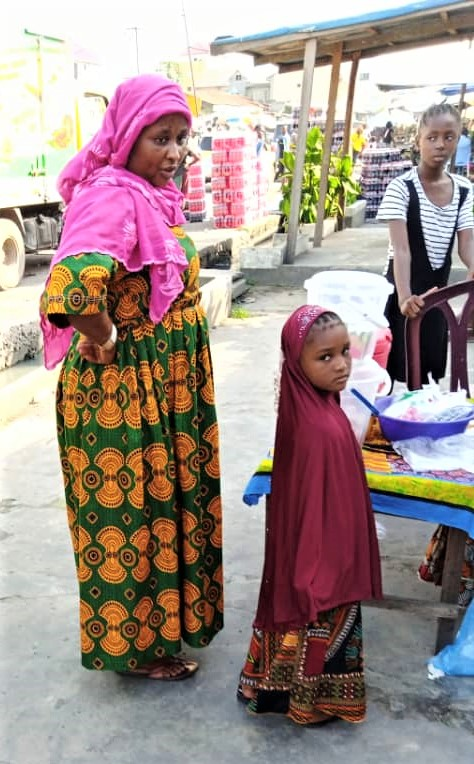
A woman dressed in a traditional African dress with a bright pink headscarf beside her young daughter wearing a maroon hijab and a patterned skirt in Kinshasa

The city's internal migration began during the colonial era and intensified after independence in 1960. Waves of Congolese from various provinces moved to Kinshasa for work, greater political stability, and better access to schools and services. Under colonial rule, people from northern and central Congo generally traveled by river, while others arrived by road through Bandundu and Kongo Central. These movements grew after independence and peaked during the 1990s political transition and the First and Second Congo Wars in the east. The city also attracted transnational migrants, including the Lari, who settled on fertile, vacant land and were the first to introduce various vegetables, such as cabbage, carrots, tomatoes, and cucumbers. The Coastmen, or Ndingari, a term that refers to West African migrants from present-day Nigeria, Ghana, Mali, Senegal, Benin, Guinea, and Togo. Most were Muslim and earned their living through public works, teaching, commerce, and other trades. They influenced local culture by introducing polygamy and wax-printed fabrics (pagnes wax).

The Zombo, originally from Maquela do Zombo in Angola's Uíge Province, form Kinshasa's largest foreign African community. They first arrived as traders and laborers and, from the 1950s onward, many were forced to work at the CITAS port, handling and moving palm products, copal resin, cotton, and ivory. They became known for their physical endurance and work ethic, making them ideal laborers in the eyes of colonial authorities. The Zombo also introduced door-to-door sales of rice, doughnuts, and beans in African quartiers, a practice that later developed into street vending with handmade carts called pousse-pousse. Their numbers grew sharply during World War II, spurred by economic opportunities in the Belgian Congo and repression in Angola under António de Oliveira Salazar. The harsh policies of his Estado Novo regime, particularly the brutal enforcement tactics of the PIDE, pushed many Angolans to seek refuge in Kinshasa. Belgian colonial authorities, constrained by porous borders and entrenched kinship networks among the Bakongo across both nations, were largely ineffectual in stemming this border-crossing migration. More inclined to settle permanently than other migrant groups, the Zombo raised generations who adopted Kinshasa's languages and culture, some of whom later enlisted in the Force Publique. Many of them gradually became craftworkers and small-scale producers, introducing handmade women's sandals with soles cut from used car tires.

Long-established communities such as the Lebanese, Greeks, Indians, and Pakistanis have remained active.

=== Language ===
The official language is French (See: Kinshasa French vocabulary). Kinshasa is the largest officially Francophone city in the world, though many residents struggle to speak it. The city was the host of the 14th Francophonie Summit in October 2012. Four national languages, such as Lingala, Tshiluba, Kikongo, and Swahili, are also spoken, along with several vernacular languages.

=== Education ===
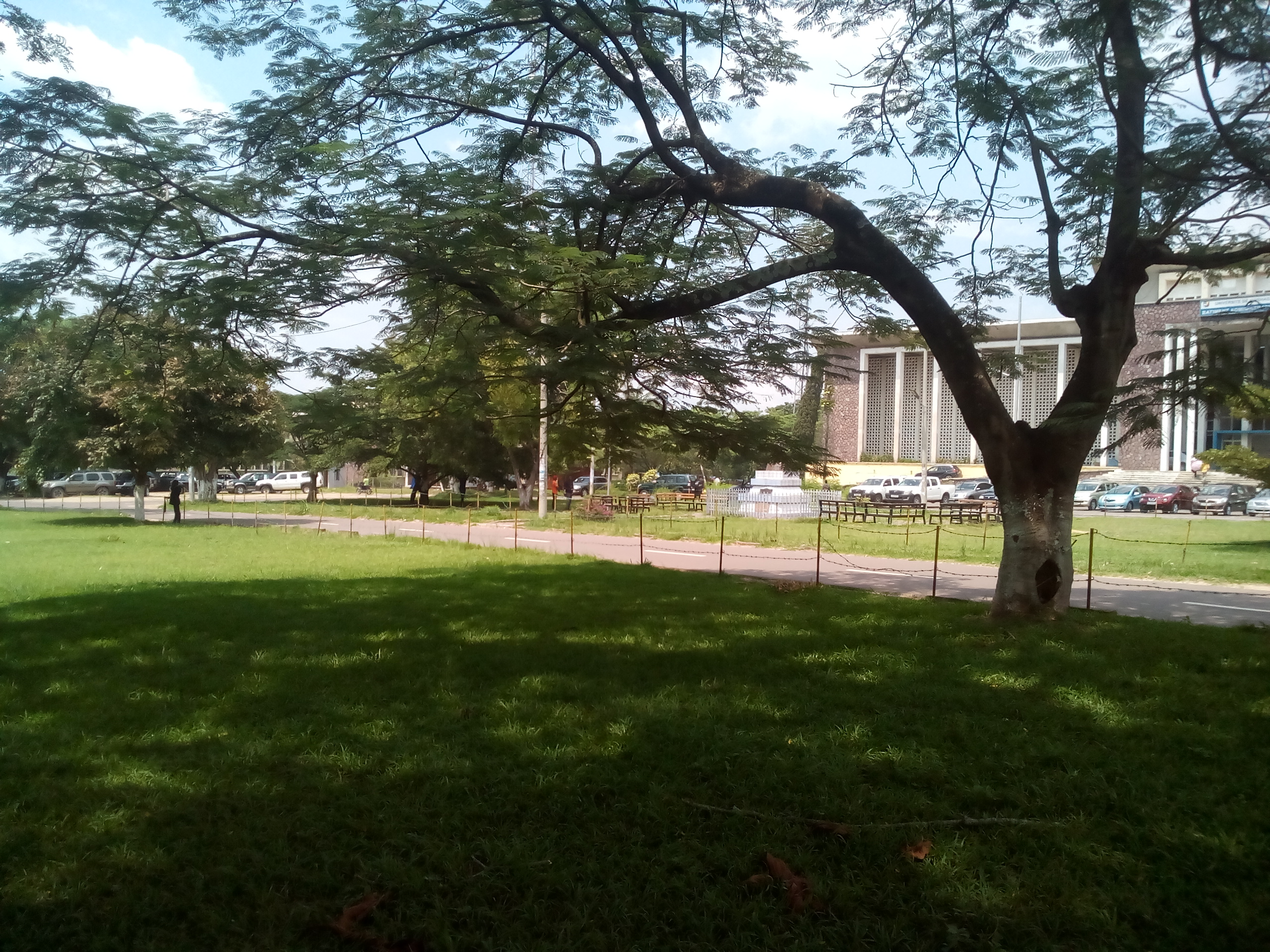
Park of the University of Kinshasa with the Administrative Building in the background

Kinshasa is home to several education institutes, covering a wide range of disciplines, including civil engineering, nursing, and journalism. The city is also home to three large universities and an arts school:

- University of Kinshasa
- National Pedagogy University
- National Institute of Agronomic Studies and Research (INERA)
- Cardinal Malula University
- Académie de Design (AD)
- Institut Supérieur d'Architecture et Urbanisme
- Pan-African University of the Congo
- Université Libre de Kinshasa
- Université catholique du Congo
- Congo Protestant University
- Université Chretienne de Kinshasa
- National Institute of Arts
- Institut Supérieur de Publicité et Médias
- Centre for Health Training (CEFA)

Primary and secondary schools:

- Lycée Prince de Liège (primary and secondary education, French Community of Belgium curriculum)
- Prins van Luikschool Kinshasa (primary education, Flanders curriculum)
- Lycée Français René Descartes (primary and secondary education, French curriculum)
- The American School of Kinshasa
- Allhadeff School

The education system in DRC is plagued by low coverage, low quality and poor educational infrastructure, especially in rural areas. According to USAID (2018), 3.5 million children of primary school age are out of school, and 44% of those who do attend school started only after age six. Various statistical estimates by UNESCO, (2013) regarding secondary and tertiary education also reveal the difficulties facing the country. In DRC it is difficult to get a reliable estimate on the actual proportion of the population who can read and write, however, according to data from UIS (2016), the literacy rate of the population of 15 years and older in the country, is estimated to 77.04%. This rate is 88.5% for men and 66.5% for women. There is also a shortage of reading material, and no culture of reading for pleasure.

=== Healthcare ===
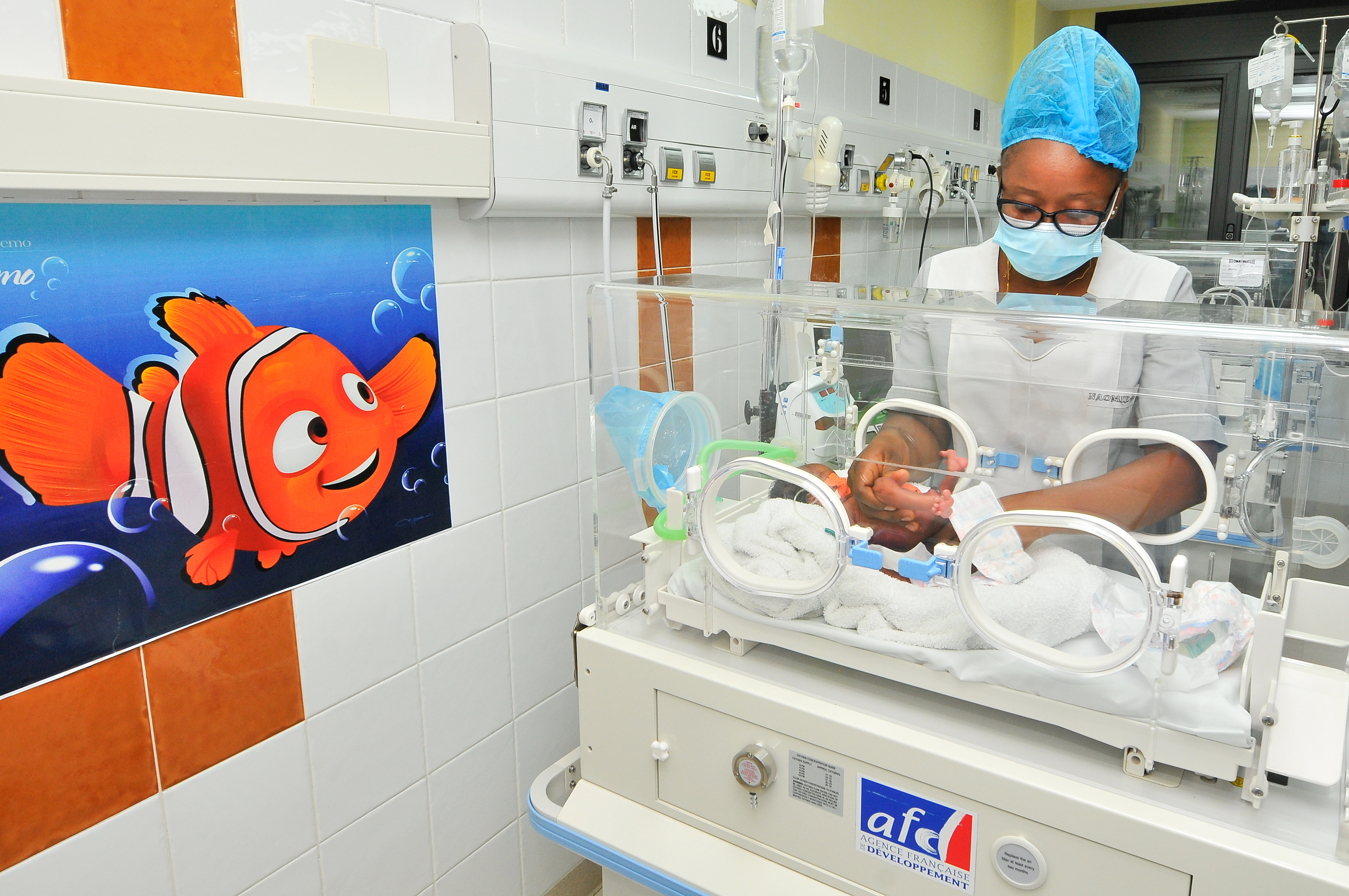
Monkole Hospital, Kinshasa

There are twenty hospitals in Kinshasa, plus various medical centers and polyclinics.

During the early 20th century, Kinshasa played a pivotal and unintended role in the emergence of the global HIV-1 pandemic. Historical analysis and genetic research indicate that the virus, which originated through a cross-species transmission event in Central Africa in the 1920s, found an ideal environment for dissemination within the city. The rapid urbanization driven by colonial expansion, which included the development of transport infrastructure like railways and river steamers, combined with social upheaval and the widespread reuse of medical needles, created a "perfect storm" that facilitated the spread of the virus from its initial localized cases to a broader population long before the disease was clinically recognized in the 1980s.

=== Religion ===
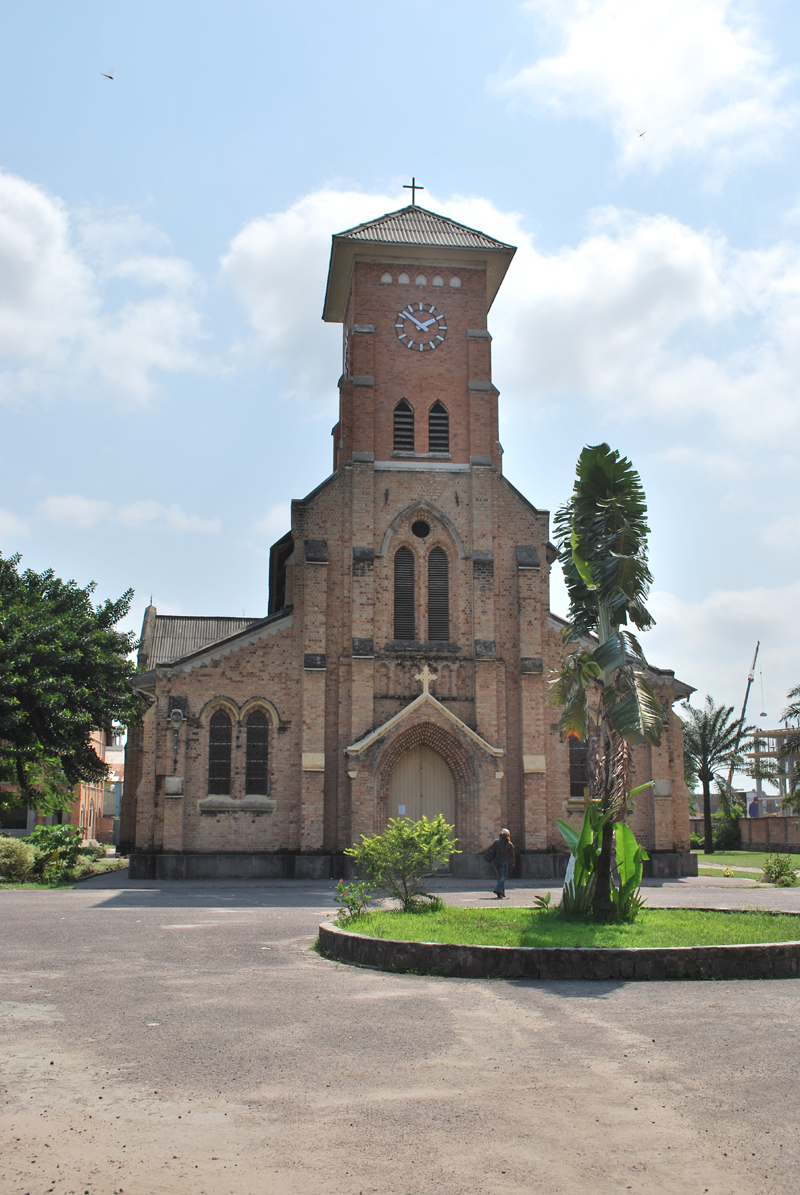
Église Sainte-Anne de Kinshasa (Catholic Church in the Democratic Republic of the Congo)

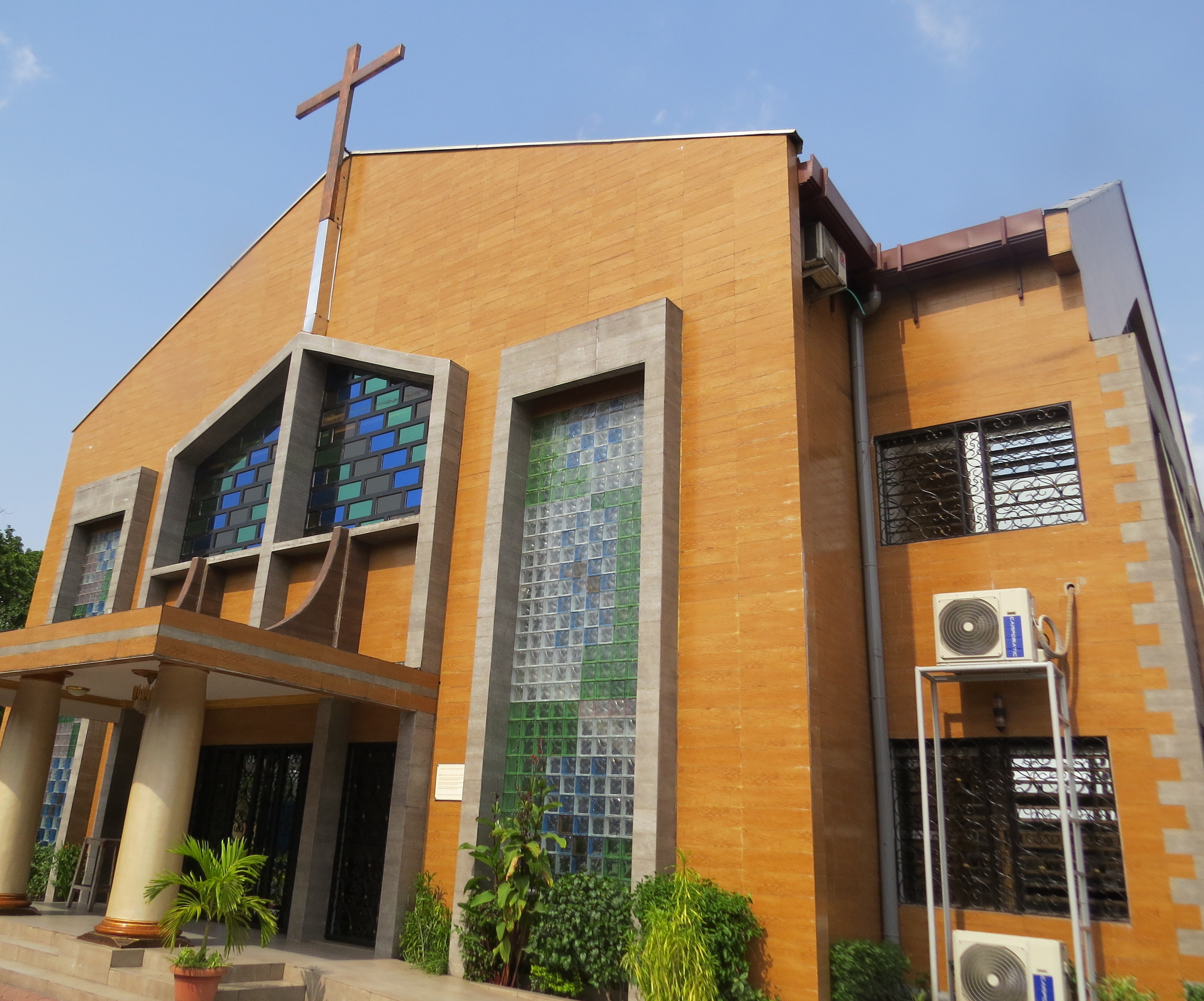
Église Francophone CBCO Kintambo (Baptist Community of Congo)

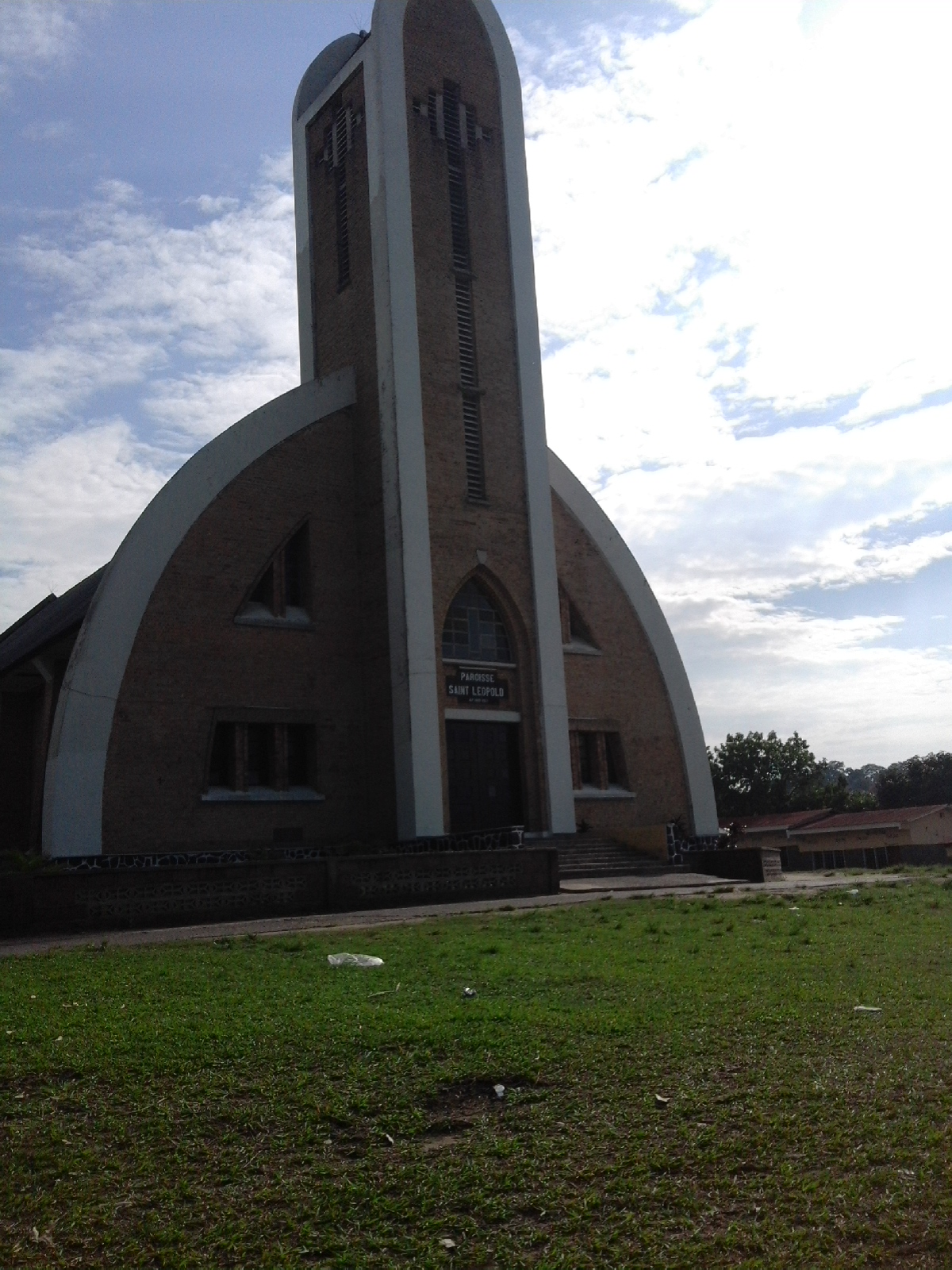
Eglise Saint Léopold à Ngaliema, Kinshasa

Among the places of worship, which are predominantly Christian churches and temples: Roman Catholic Archdiocese of Kinshasa (Catholic Church), Kimbanguist Church, Baptist Community of Congo (Baptist World Alliance), Baptist Community of the Congo River (Baptist World Alliance), The Salvation Army, Assemblies of God, Province of the Anglican Church of the Congo (Anglican Communion), The Church of Jesus Christ of Latter-day Saints which has a temple and over 100 congregations in Kinshasa, Presbyterian Community in Congo (World Communion of Reformed Churches). There are also Muslim mosques. A Baha'i House of Worship is in construction. A Jewish synagogue, operated by the Chabad world movement, exists.

== Government and politics ==
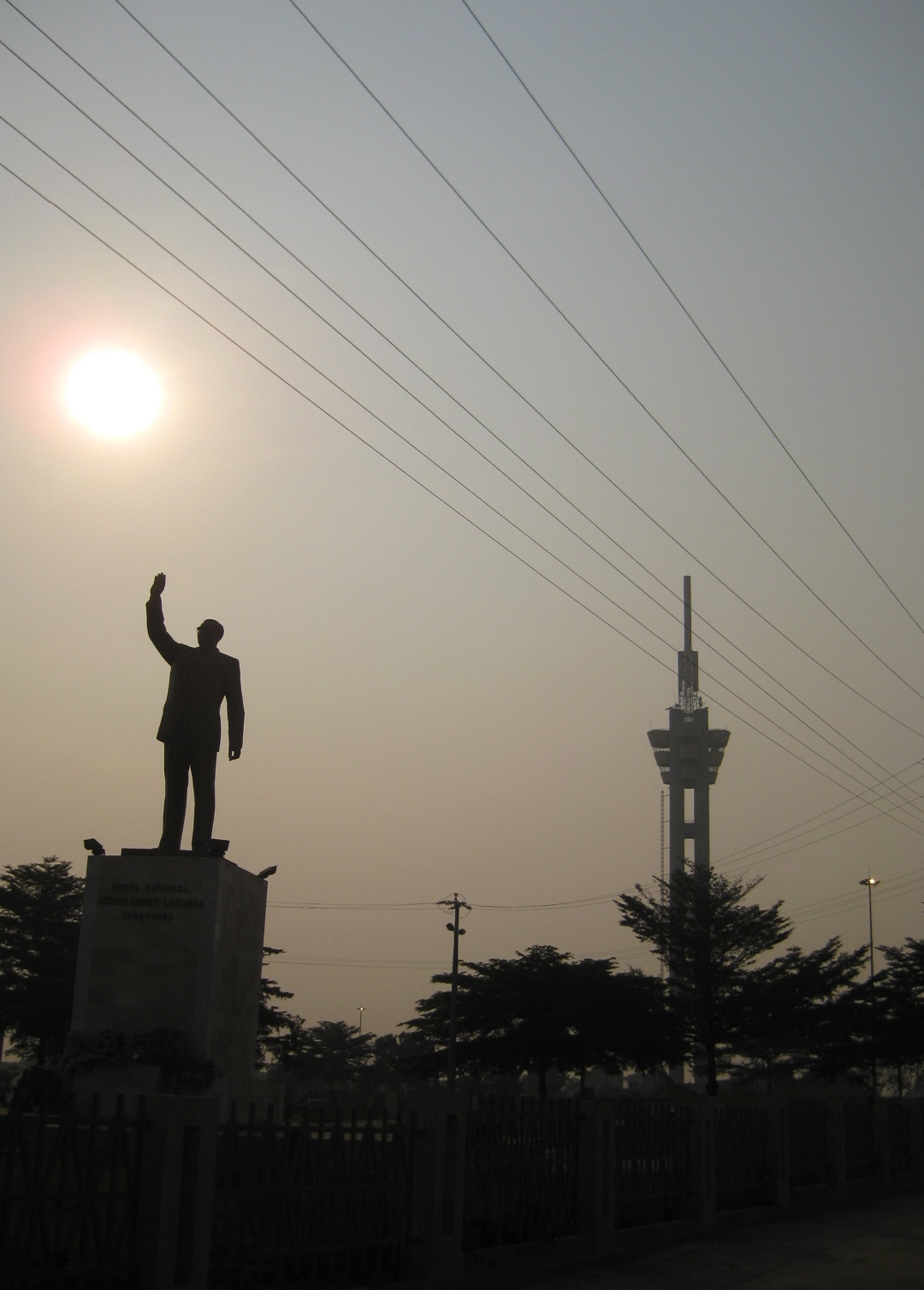
Statue of Lumumba, and behind it the Limete Tower

=== Administrative history ===
Kinshasa was founded on 1 August 1881 as Léopold II Station. It later became the chief town (chef-lieu) of the Stanley Pool, Haute N'sele, and Panzi-Kasaï districts. A royal decree of 11 April 1914, which implemented administrative reforms introduced by the Law of 11 March 1911, designated Kinshasa as the capital of the Belgian Congo and the chief town of the districts of Bas-Congo, Kwango, Kasaï, Sankuru, and the urban district of Léopoldville. An ordinance dated 25 June 1941 granted Kinshasa city status and established an urban committee (comité urbain). In 1960, the Fundamental Law of 19 May replaced the Colonial Charter and designated Kinshasa as a neutral city and the seat of the national political institutions. Ordinance No. 68/024 of 20 January 1968 granted Kinshasa a political and administrative status equivalent to that of a province and increased the number of communes from 11 to 24. Under the Constitution of 18 February 2006, Kinshasa became a province within the Democratic Republic of the Congo.

=== Government and public institutions ===
Kinshasa is governed by the provincial assembly and the provincial government. The provincial assembly is the city's legislative body and has 48 elected deputies and a bureau consisting of a president, vice-president, questeur, rapporteur, and deputy rapporteur. The provincial government consists of the governor, vice-governor, and provincial ministers. The provincial director advises the governor and coordinates the work of 50 departmental directorates and inspectorates. These offices represent national ministries at the provincial level and implement government policies and regulations.

Kinshasa is divided into 24 communes, each of which is also divided into quartiers (quarters). The communes are decentralized territorial entities (entités territoriales décentralisées, ETDs) with legal status and administrative autonomy. Each has two main governing bodies: the Communal Council (Conseil communal) and the Communal Executive College (Collège exécutif communal).

The Communal Council is the commune's deliberative body, whose members, known as communal councilors, are elected by direct universal suffrage. The council considers matters of local economic, social, cultural, and technical interest. It also indirectly elects the bourgmestre (mayor) and bourgmestre-adjoint (deputy mayor) and oversees implementation of the executive's action plan.

The Communal Executive College manages the commune and carries out the council's decisions. It consists of the bourgmestre, the deputy bourgmestre, and two communal aldermen (échevins communaux). The bourgmestre heads the executive body, assisted by the deputy bourgmestre.

Each quartier has an administrative team comprising a chef de quartier, a deputy, a secretary, a population officer, and two or three enumerators.

Every commune provides services such as civil registration, sanitation, and population administration. They are also supported by technical offices linked to national ministries, which help carry out government tasks at the local level. These offices deal with matters such as urban planning, infrastructure, agriculture, fisheries, livestock, public health, education, environmental protection, energy, finance, budgeting, and demographic statistics. Local branches of the National Intelligence Agency (ANR), the Directorate General of Migration (DGM), and the Congolese National Police are also present in the communes.

Palais du Peuple

At the national level, Kinshasa is home to several major government institutions and administrative buildings. Gombe contains the president's official residence, the Palais de la Nation, along with the Palais de Justice, the Constitutional Court Building and the Immeuble du Gouvernement. It also houses the Central Bank of the Congo's headquarters on Boulevard du Colonel Tshatshi. In Lingwala, the Paul Panda Farnana Administrative Building houses several ministries, while the Palais du Peuple houses Parliament's two chambers: the Senate and the National Assembly. In Ngaliema, the Cité de l'OUA was constructed in 1967 when Kinshasa hosted the heads of state summit of the Organization of African Unity and has since been adapted for government use.

Since 2008, the provincial government has established several technical public services, collectively known as "urban régies", which fall under the governor's authority. These include:

Agency	Function	Ref.
Régie Immobilière de Kinshasa (RIMMOKIN)	Manages real estate	
Régie d'Assainissement et des Travaux Publics de Kinshasa (now Régie d'Assainissement de Kinshasa)	Oversees sanitation and public works	
Régie de Transport Urbain de Kinshasa (RETRANSKIN)	Handles urban transportation services	
Direction Générale de Recettes de Kinshasa (DGRK)	Manages city revenue collection	
Commission Permanente sur la Publicité Extérieure (CPPE)	Regulates outdoor advertising	
Autorité de Régulation de la Publicité Extérieure	Enforces advertising standards	

=== Politics ===
As of 2015, the Mouvement de Libération du Congo (MLC) held legislative predominance; however, the provincial elections of 20 December 2023 resulted in a power shift in favor of the presidential coalition, the Union Sacrée de la Nation (USN), led by President Félix Tshisekedi's Union pour la Démocratie et le Progrès Social (UDPS), which secured 14 seats. Daniel Bumba assumed the governorship on 21 June 2024. Kinshasa wields sovereign powers, encompassing the authority to issue passports and to act on behalf of the country in international forums. The city also hosts the headquarters of the United Nations Organization Stabilization Mission in the Democratic Republic of the Congo (MONUSCO), formerly known as MONUC. In 2016, the United Nations bolstered its peacekeeping presence in Kinshasa in response to civil unrest related to President Joseph Kabila's controversial extension of power.

International and non-governmental organizations exert significant influence on local development and governance. The Belgian development agency, Enabel, has been a key actor since 2016 through its sponsorship of the Programme d'Appui aux Initiatives de Développement Communautaire (PAIDECO), a €6 million initiative aimed at stimulating economic development in the region. The initial implementation took place in Kimbanseke, a densely populated hill commune with an estimated population of nearly one million. In a strategic effort to address urban overcrowding and stimulate regional development, the provincial government established the Comité Stratégique pour la Supervision du Projet d'Extension de la Ville de Kinshasa (CSSPEVK) in October 2023. The committee, under the leadership of a provincial coordinator, was tasked with overseeing the "Kinshasa Kia Mona" urban expansion project in the Maluku district.

== Economy ==
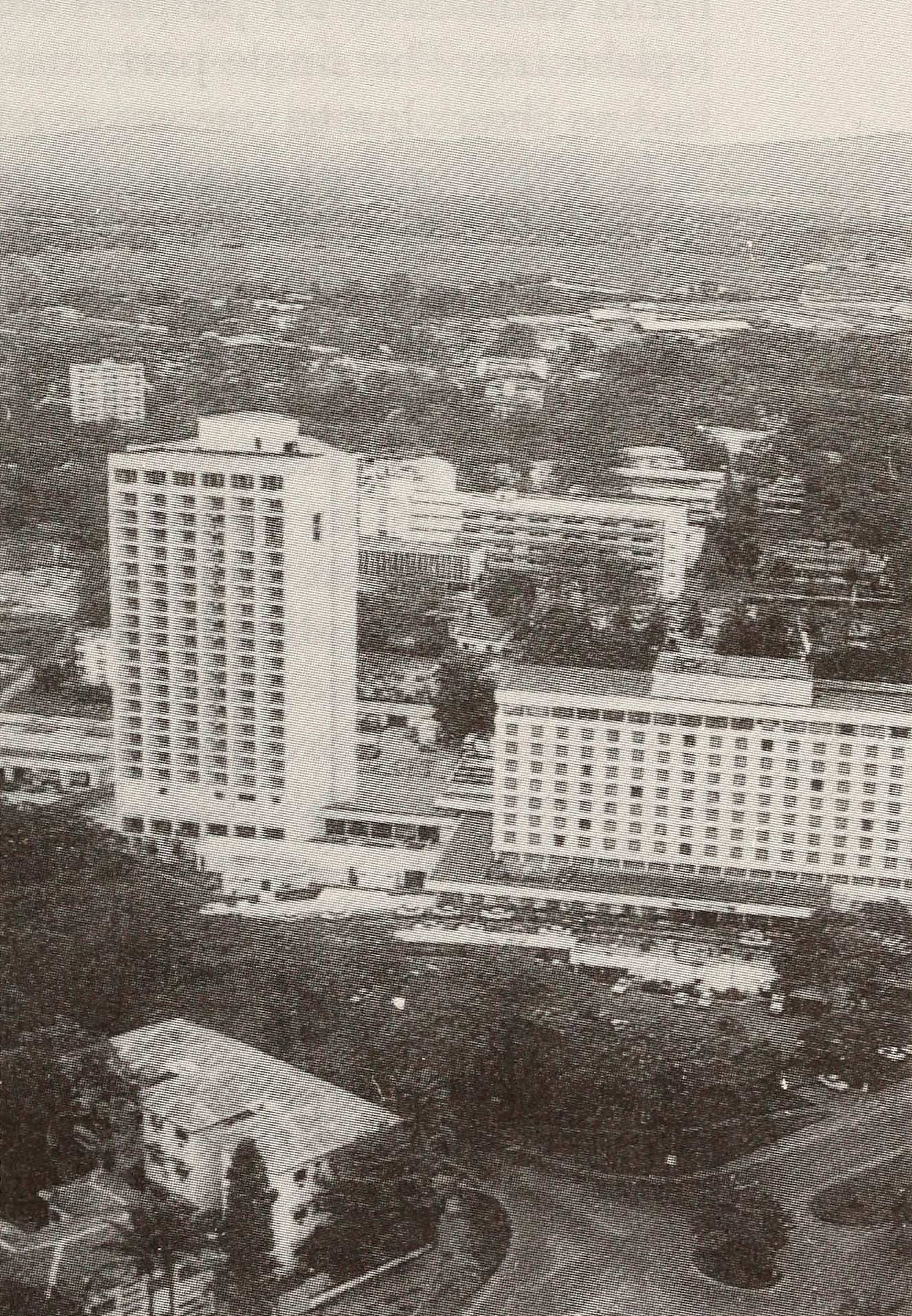
Modern buildings on the outskirts of Kinshasa, c. 1980–1993

Kinshasa's economy grew through industrial development, with industries including food processing, textiles, metallurgy, and assembly-line manufacturing for domestic and export markets. Its economic prominence peaked in the 1970s, a period known as la belle époque. The city accounted for 25% of Zaire's salaried workforce and 50% of its total wage payments, and became known as Kin la belle, Kin-Kiese, and Kin la joie.

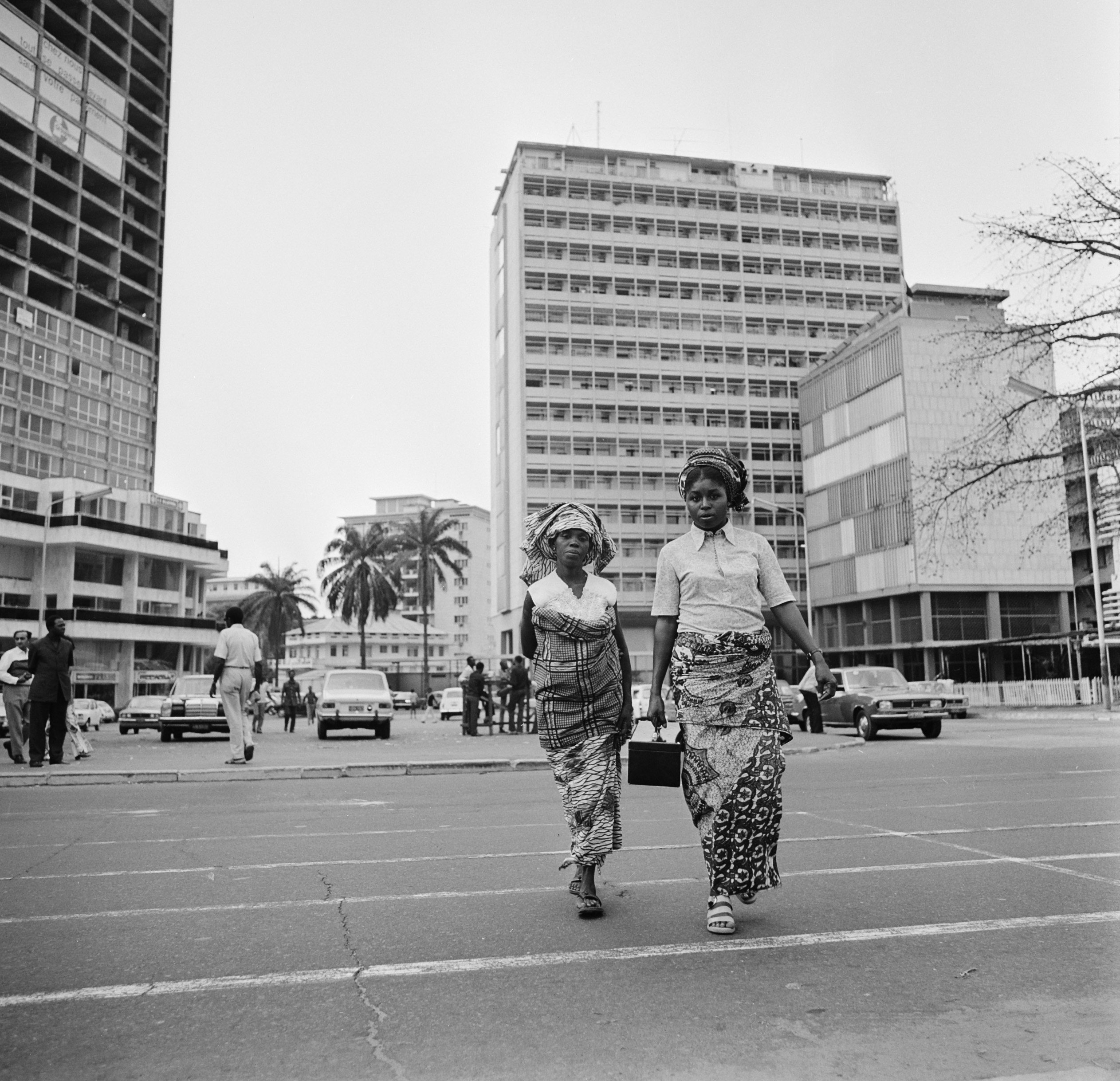
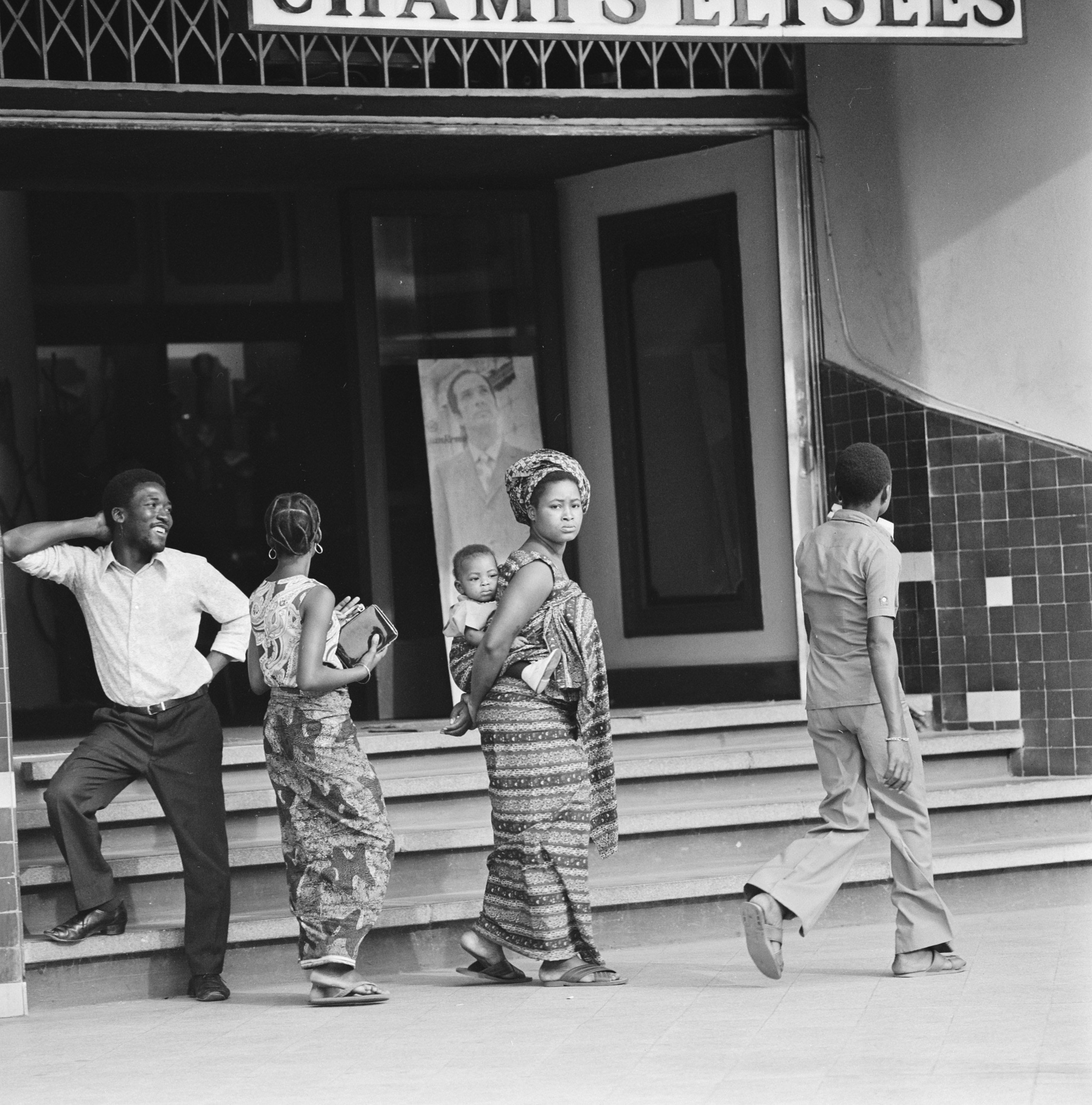
Street scenes in Kinshasa in 1973, by Dutch photographer Rob Mieremet

In 1977, Kinshasa accounted for 49.9% of the country's manufacturing industries. It ranked second in the secondary sector (18%), behind Katanga (67.3%), but led the tertiary sector (27.3%), ahead of Katanga (22%). Kinshasa also contained 22.8% of the country's registered businesses, compared with Katanga's 18%. Surveys from 1974 to 1977 reported that managerial staff represented 6.5% of Kinshasa's working population and other workers 27.2%, together accounting for 33.7%. In 1980, an estimated 412,000 people held stable jobs, with each potentially supporting five to six dependents. By the late 1980s, however, rising prices had eroded workers' purchasing power. In 1988, only 20% of civil servants reportedly earned enough to meet their needs. By 1990, salaried workers struggled to afford living expenses in Kinshasa and elsewhere in the country. The decline was evident in comparisons with 1977, when managerial salaries covered 62% of employees' needs and other workers' salaries covered 51%.

The looting of 1991 and 1992 dealt a significant blow to Kinshasa's already fragile economy. An estimated 300,000 executives and skilled workers lost their jobs, while the Agence Nationale des Entrepreneurs du Zaïre (now Fédération des Entreprises du Congo) reported approximately 100,000 job losses during this period. Political unrest and wars that followed weakened the economy and slowed industrial growth for many years. Rapid population growth and limited employment opportunities for technical and university graduates worsened unemployment, and as formal industrial employment declined, much of the workforce moved into the informal sector, which now accounts for nearly 70% of Kinshasa's labor force. Mean household spending in 2005 was the equivalent of US$2,150, amounting to $1 per day per person. The median household spending was $1,555, 66 cents per person per day. Among the poor, more than half of this spending goes to food, especially bread and cereal.

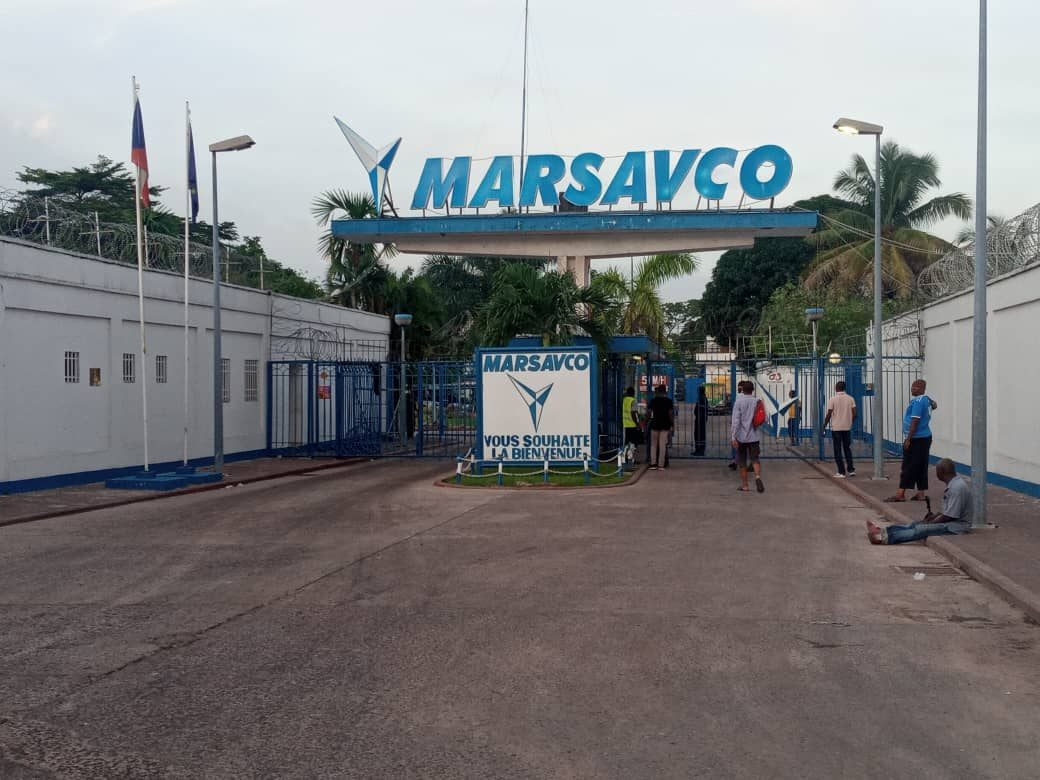
Marsavco

=== Companies and real real estate ===
Gombe is home to manufacturing companies such as Marsavco S.A., All Pack Industries, and Angel Cosmetics. Other important parts of the city's economy include financial services, food processing, construction, and various service businesses.

Real estate development includes commercial buildings, residential complexes, villas, and hotels, with significant activity in Gombe and other affluent quarters. High-rise office and residential buildings have become a feature of the city's development. The city's construction sector began growing in the early 2000s, and building activity increased further in the years that followed. New projects appeared in different parts of the city, such as La Promenade residential complex in Ngaliema, which consists of 61 villas, Le Panoramique near Gare Centrale in Gombe, and Le Mirage in Funa District.

Near the GGMart hypermarket in Ngaliema, a residential complex was developed and promoted through a campaign titled "Rêve Congo" ("dream Congo"). Gombe has also attracted many substantial residential and commercial developments around the Pullman Kinshasa Grand Hotel and Fleuve Congo Hôtel, along Batetela, Uvira, and Nations-Unies avenues, and near the Kinshasa Financial Center. Development along the Congo River faces flood risk, and in January 2024, rising river levels reportedly inundated much of Cité du Fleuve, a residential development by Hawkwood Properties Congo in Limete. The real estate sector has expanded through companies associated with Indian and Lebanese investors. Prominent Indian-linked businesses include Parkland, associated with the Rawji family; Grandes Constructions du Congo, Building Bloc, and Simkha, associated with the Manji family; and Modern Construction Congo, associated with Harish Jagtani and Sajid Umedali Dhrolia. Modern Construction Congo's projects include the Kiyo Ya Sita tower on Boulevard du 30 Juin, Galerie La Fontaine on Avenue Batetela, and two towers near the Congo River, one of which houses a Hilton hotel. Safricode is another company associated with Dhrolia. Companies associated with Lebanese investors include the Société congolaise de construction moderne, part of Glory Group, and the Société de travaux et de construction, associated with the Achour Group. The former succeeded Congo Futur.

Since the Mobutu era, Chinese construction firms have contributed to major projects, including the Palais du Peuple and Kamanyola Stadium, now Stade des Martyrs. Current Chinese-linked projects include the Central African Cultural and Arts Center (Centre Culturel et Artistique pour les pays d'Afrique Centrale; CCAPAC), associated with China Communications Construction Company, and the Kin-Oasis residential complex in Bandalungwa, developed by Société Zhengwei Technique Coopération (SZTC) in partnership with the Congolese state. Turkish firm Milvest, a subsidiary of Miller Holding, has undertaken the Kinshasa Financial Center and the planned Kinshasa Arena, a 20,000-seat venue near Stade des Martyrs. The company has also been linked to a proposed cable car system involving French firm Poma.

Fleuve Congo Hôtel

Despite continued real estate growth, luxury housing remains unaffordable for much of Kinshasa's population. In 2016, Kinshasa ranked as Africa's most expensive city for expatriate employees, ahead of nearly 200 cities worldwide. High housing costs have pushed some middle-income workers, including teachers and public- and private-sector employees, to seek homes on the city's outskirts. Residential growth has spread beyond the airport toward Kwilu province and south along National Road 1 toward Kasangulu in Kongo Central province. Limited affordable housing and household incomes also constrain home maintenance and renovation. Much residential construction occurs in the informal sector, where compliance with building codes and technical standards is inconsistent. In newer neighborhoods, unplanned growth and poorly divided plots also complicate urban planning.

Kinshasa's once-limited hotel sector has expanded and attracted international brands and management companies, particularly in the luxury market. The Memling is one of the city's long-established hotels, dating from the colonial period. The Pullman Kinshasa Grand Hotel, formerly known as the Hôtel Inter-Continental and Grand Hôtel de Kinshasa, subsequently became part of the Pullman brand, owned by Accor. The Fleuve Congo Hôtel by Blazon Hotels occupies the renovated former Centre de Commerce International du Zaïre (CCIZ) building, taken over by Dubai-based Smart Hospitality Solutions in 2019. The Kin Plaza Arjaan by Rotana opened in February 2017 through a partnership between the Achour Group and Abu Dhabi-based Rotana Hotel Management Corporation PJSC. Developed and financed by Modern Construction Congo, the 22-storey Hilton Kinshasa opened on 19 August 2023 along the Congo River near the port and Beach Ngobila; Atlanta-based Valor Hospitality Partners manages the property. Novotel Kinshasa, another Accor property, opened in November 2023. Additional expansion has included plans for a five-star hotel at the Kinshasa Financial Center.

=== Tourism ===
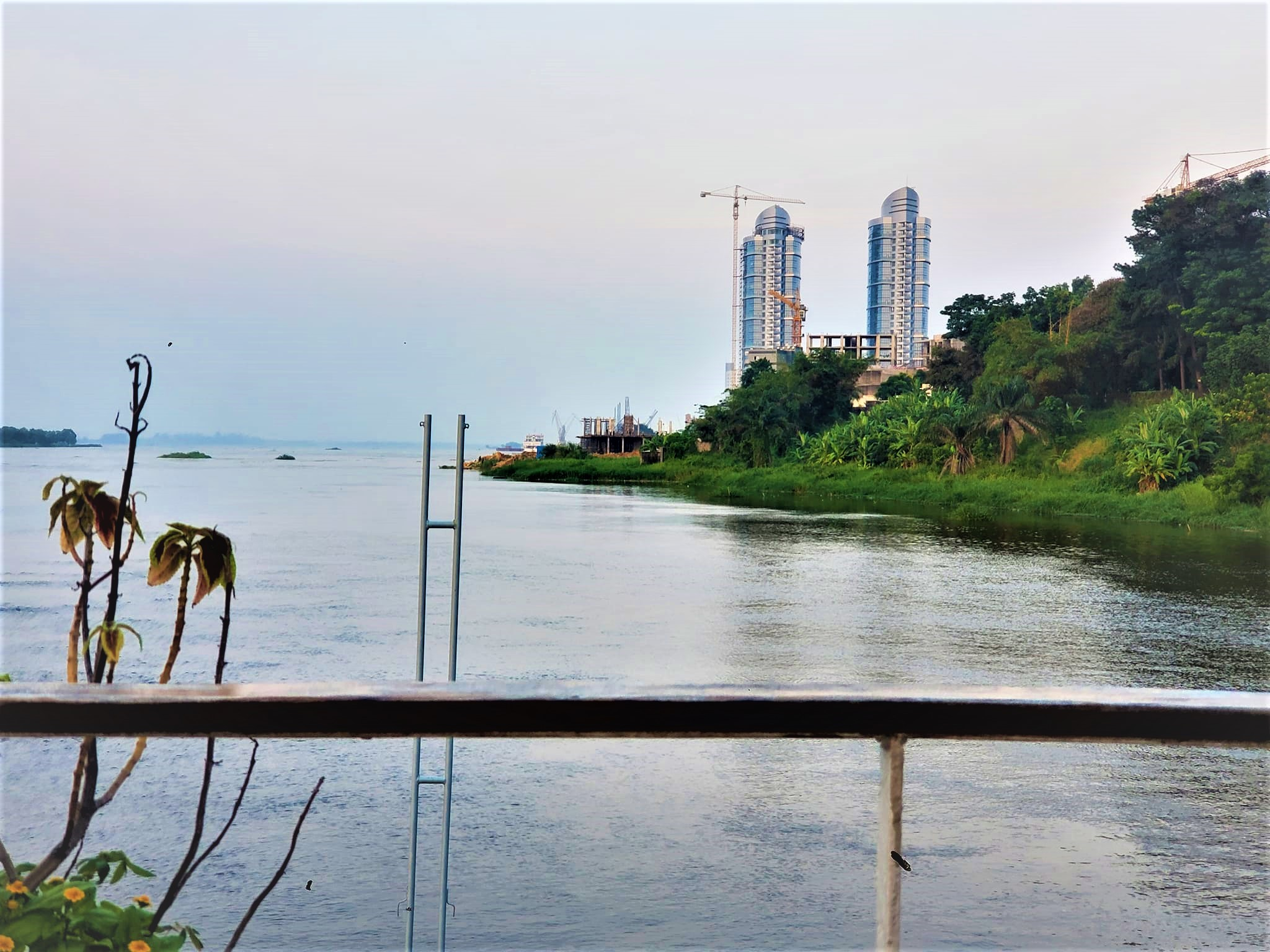
The view of the Congo River from Kinshasa

Associated with the city's early development, Ngaliema contains historical sites linked to Henry Morton Stanley's camp and Stanley Pool Station, alongside views of the Congo River and Ngaliema Bay and centuries-old trees. Its landmarks include Sims Chapel (1891), built by Reverend Aaron Sims of the American Baptist Foreign Mission Society and regarded as the city's first Christian building; Saint-Léopold Catholic parish, founded in 1899; and the Institute of National Museums of Congo.

The Palais de Marbre housed guests during Mobutu's rule before becoming Laurent-Désiré Kabila's presidential residence. Ngaliema's other landmarks include the African Union City, created for the OAU summit in 1967; the Pioneers' Cemetery (Cimetière des Pionniers); and remnants of colonial shipyards and port facilities. Ngaliema also contains the Kintambo-Magasins commercial center, a former caravan route terminus, and early communal buildings that once housed the region's first European hospital. The commune also has workshops producing furniture from kekele liana, as well as the Symphonies Naturelles.

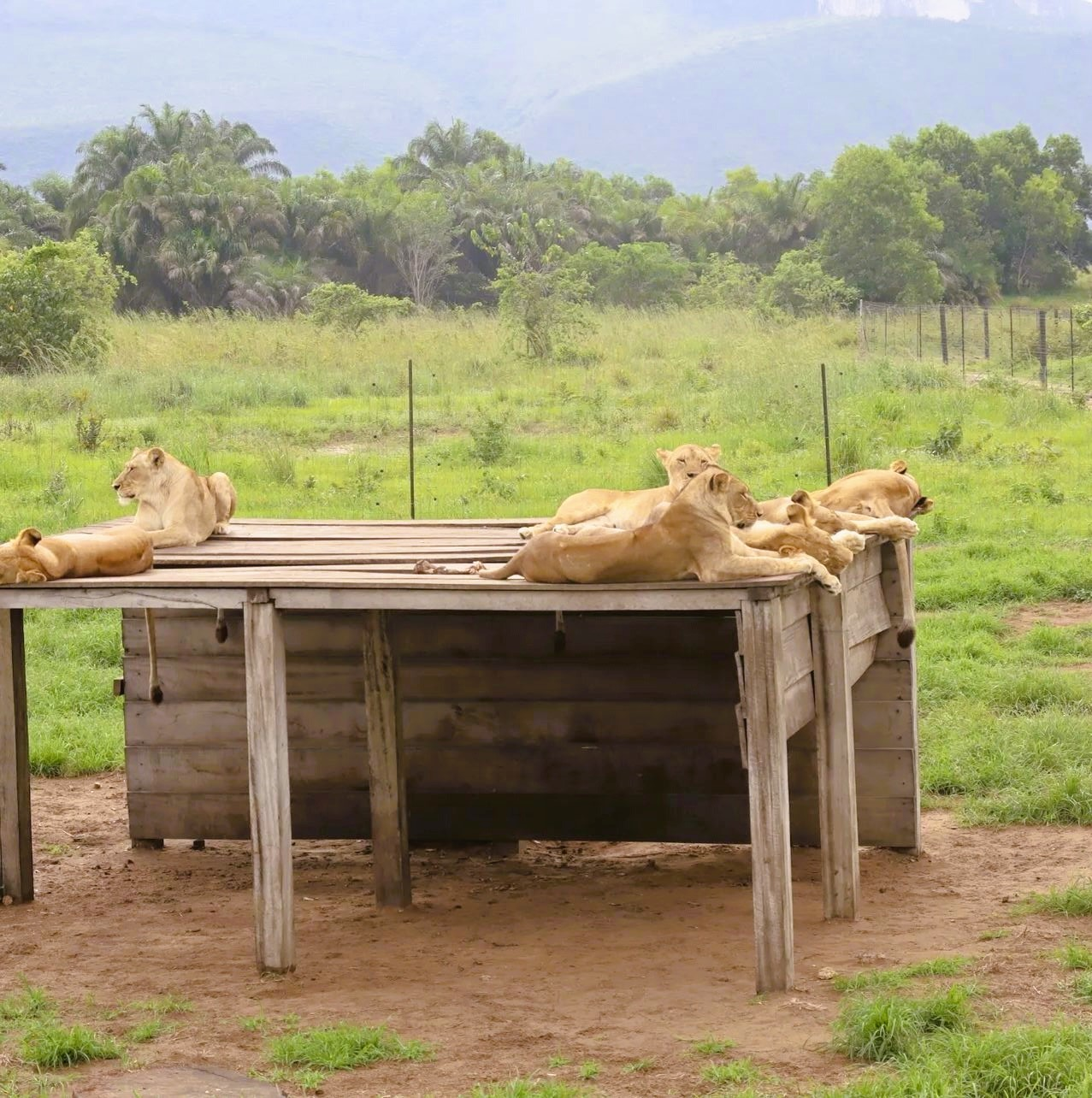
Nsele Valley Park

An early site of colonial contact at the foot of Mount Ngaliema, Kintambo became the first designated cité indigène, and its landmarks reflect the history of Léo-Ouest and Kinshasa's colonial development, including Kintambo Vélodrome Stadium, built in 1936, and Saint Francis Parish, established in 1939. Gombe also retains several colonial-era schools such as Boboto College, Bosangani High School (formerly Sacré-Cœur), the Gombe Institute (formerly the Royal Atheneum of Kalina), the Gombe Technical Institute, and Notre-Dame Institute. The public Académie des Beaux-Arts de Kinshasa is regarded as an influential Central African art school and has helped shape modern Congolese art.

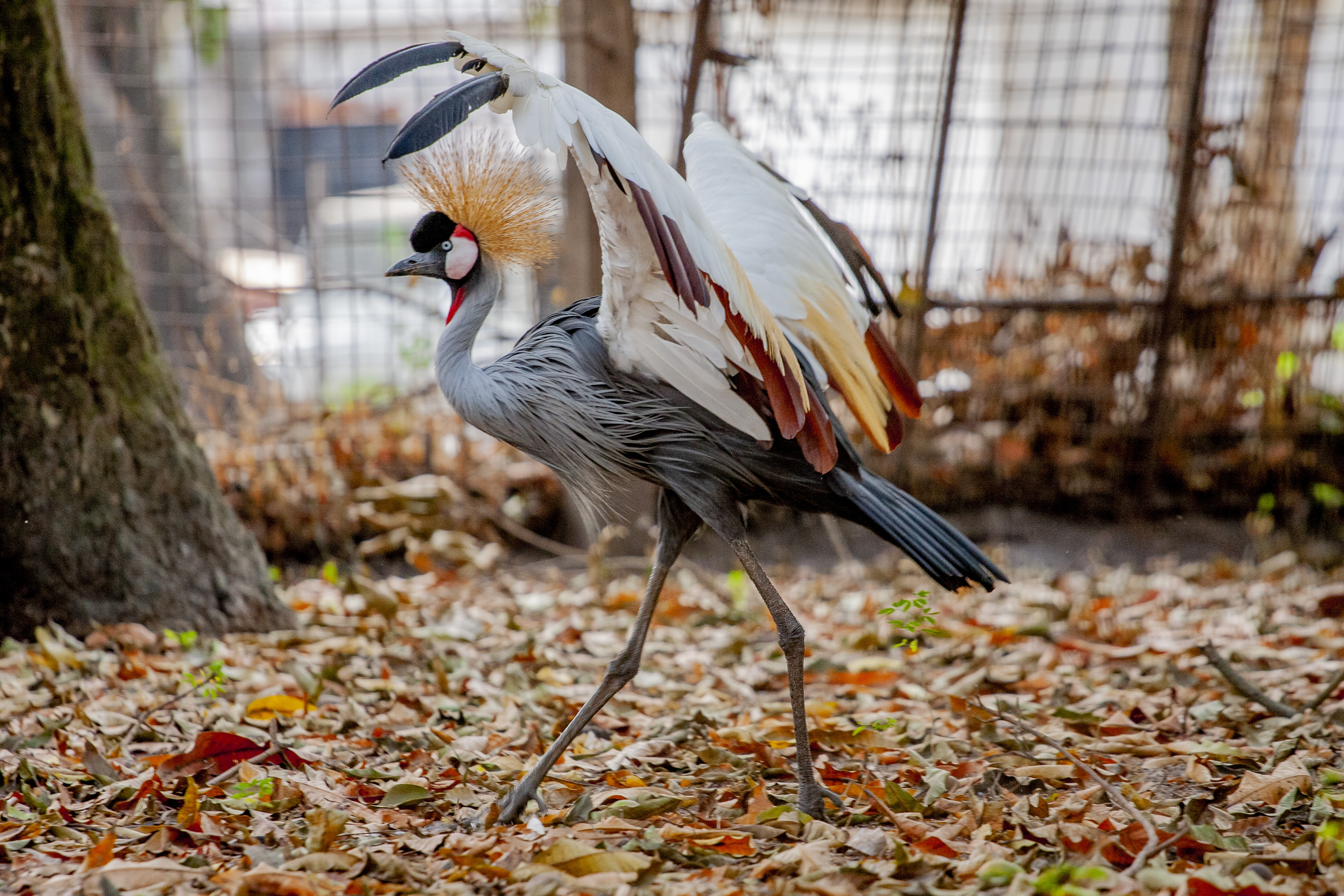
Colorful African crowned crane in Kinshasa Zoological Garden

Gombe's Congo River waterfront features some of the country's largest hotels, including the Fleuve Congo Hotel, Pullman Kinshasa Grand Hotel, and Kin Plaza Arjaan by Rotana. Its other notable sites include the Kinshasa Botanical Garden, Kinshasa Zoological Garden, Paroisse de Sainte-Anne, Palais de la Nation, and the prime minister's office. Other city attractions include Nsele Valley Park, Kinshasa Central Market, Stade des Martyrs, Stade Tata Raphaël, Stade Cardinal Malula, Sainte Marie de Kimwenza, Petites Chutes de la Lukaya, Lola ya Bonobo, Limete Tower, Gécamines Building, Lac Ma Vallée, Joli Camp Site, and Auberge.

== Culture ==
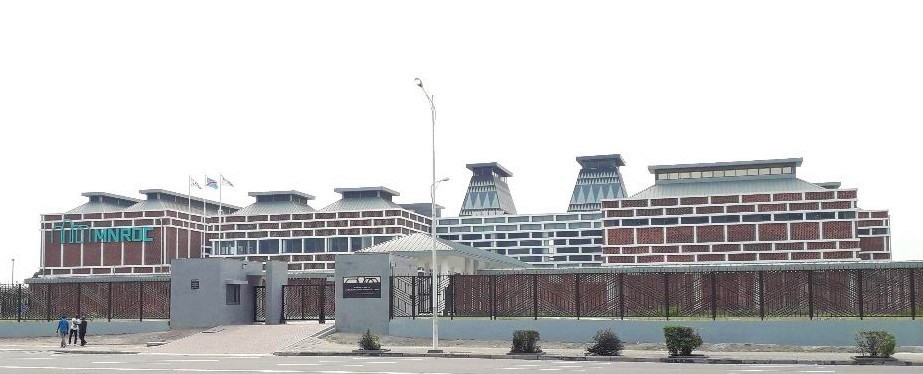
National Museum of the Democratic Republic of Congo, Kinshasa

Kinshasa has a flourishing music scene which, since the 1960s, has operated under the patronage of the city's elite. The Orchestre Symphonique Kimbanguiste, formed in 1994, began using improved musical instruments and has since grown in means and reputation.

A pop culture ideal type in Kinshasa is the mikiliste, a fashionable person with money who has traveled to Europe. Adrien Mombele, a.k.a. Stervos Niarcos, and musician Papa Wemba were early exemplars of the mikiliste style. La Sape, a linked cultural trend also described as dandyism, involves wearing flamboyant clothing.

=== Arts ===
==== Music and dance ====
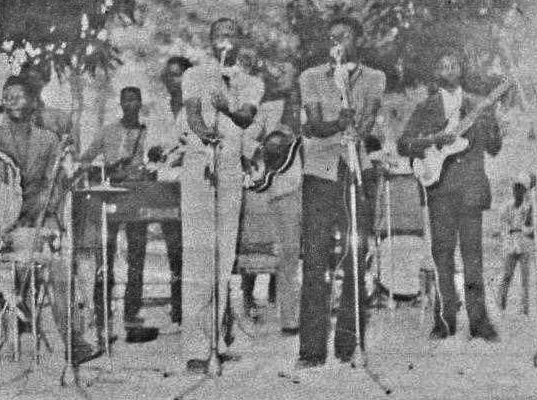
Congolese band Zaïko Langa Langa performing in Kinshasa, in 1971

Kinshasa's music scene has had a significant impact on popular culture, as many major figures of Congolese rumba launched their careers in the city, including Camille Feruzi, Henri Bowane, Manuel d'Oliveira, Wendo Kolosoy, Franco Luambo, TPOK Jazz, Beguen Band, Syran Mbenza, Le Grand Kallé, Léon Bukasa, Nico Kasanda, Tabu Ley Rochereau, Verckys Kiamuangana Mateta, African Jazz, Zaïko Langa Langa, Mbilia Bel, Madilu System, Papa Noël Nedule, Vicky Longomba, Awilo Longomba, Pépé Kallé, Sam Mangwana, Kanda Bongo Man, Nyboma, Général Défao, Papa Wemba, Viva La Musica, Koffi Olomide, Jolie Detta, Barbara Kanam, Werrason, Abeti Masikini, Jossart N'Yoka Longo, King Kester Emeneya, Lokua Kanza, Fally Ipupa, Ferré Gola, and Héritier Watanabe. During the 1950s and 1960s, Kinshasa emerged as what American journalist Susan Orlean as "Africa's most energetic recording industry", supported by several Greek-owned studios that allowed local musicians to earn a living. As rumba became deeply rooted in Congolese society, Congolese-owned studios began to flourish in the city. In 1971, Mobutu Sese Seko enlisted OK Jazz to tour the nation in support of his Authenticité campaign, which sought to elevate local culture above Western influences. However, this golden era was short-lived, as Mobutu's authoritarian rule, combined with economic decline, falling copper prices, and high inflation, crippled Kinshasa's once-thriving music industry. Many recording companies relocated abroad, especially to France and Belgium, while smaller domestic bands struggled to survive, most notably through kobwaka mabanga, a "name-dropping" system where musicians earn income by mentioning patrons' names during performances, often accounting for most of their earnings.

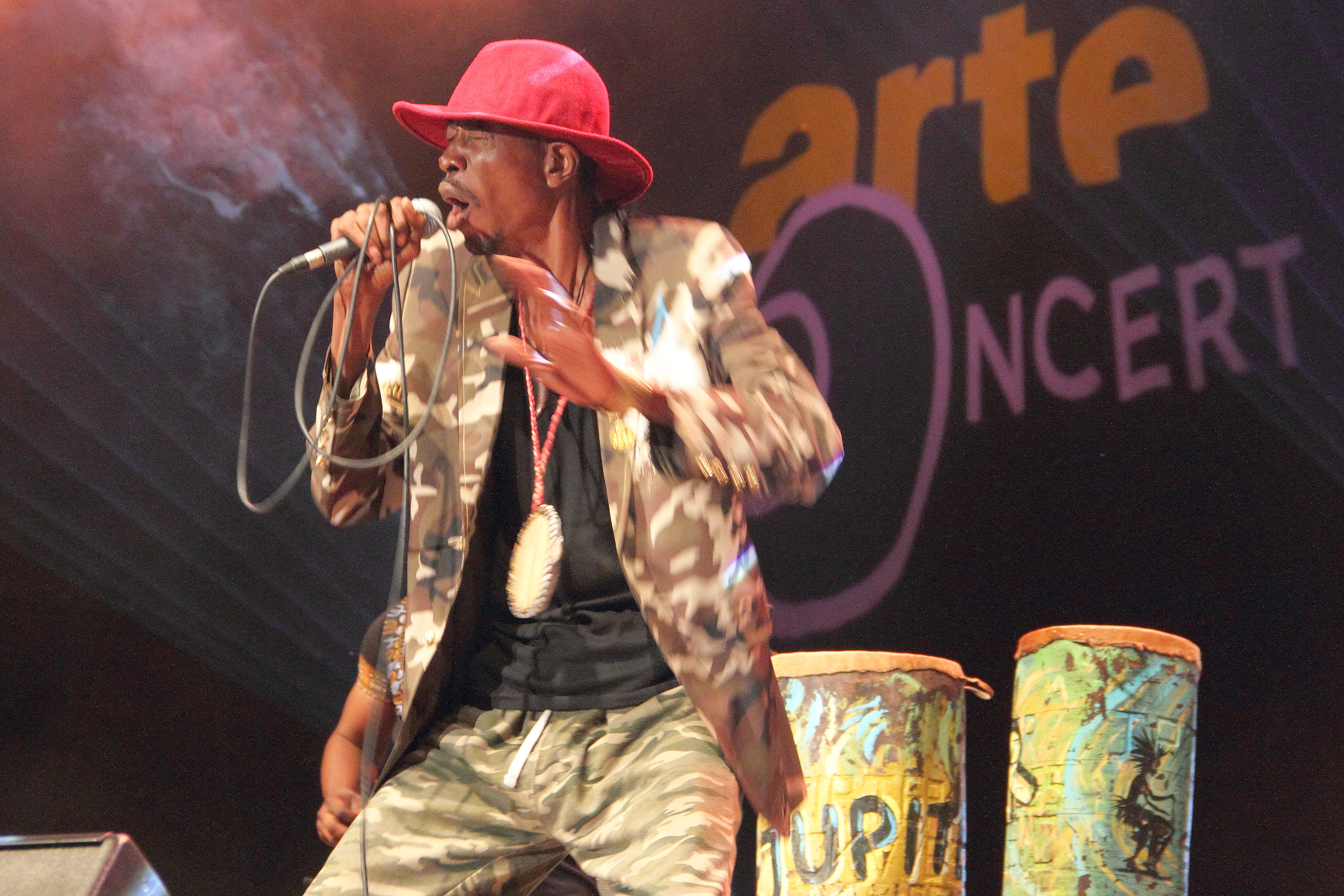
Jupiter Bokondji and his band Okwess International at Rudolstadt-Festival in 2017

The Orchestre Symphonique Kimbanguiste, formed in 1994, began using improved musical instruments and has since grown in means and reputation. Following the upheavals of the 1990s, the music scene evolved dramatically: while some artists turned to Christian gospel, others revived indigenous traditions through the tradi-modern movement, led by bands like Swédé Swédé and supported by Belgian producer Vincent Kenis. This led to the acclaimed Congotronics album series, which introduced international audiences to bands like Konono Nº1, Kasai Allstars, Staff Benda Bilili, and Mbongwana Star, who performed using handmade instruments and rudimentary amplification. In 2011, the DRC Music collective, curated by Damon Albarn, recorded the collaborative album Kinshasa One Two in just five days, bringing together over fifty Congolese musicians and international producers. Among the featured artists was Jupiter Bokondji, whose band is Okwess International.

Since 2009, the Royal Flemish Theatre in Brussels has organized the Connexion Kin arts festival in Limete. In 2011, Belgian-Congolese rapper and singer Baloji, who was born in Lubumbashi, returned to Kinshasa to record his album Kinshasa Succursale.

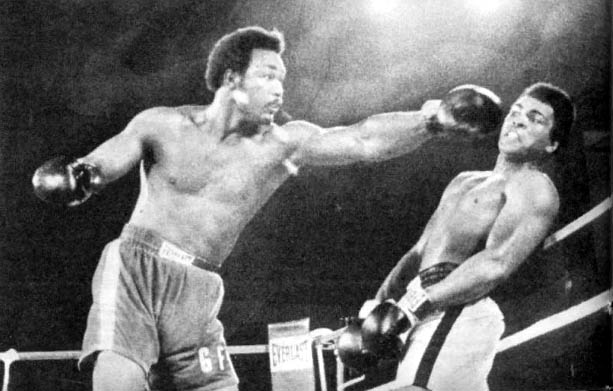
Foreman trying to punch Ali, October 1974

Kinshasa has been featured in various films, most famously in When We Were Kings (1996), which documents the historic 1974 Rumble in the Jungle boxing match between Muhammad Ali and George Foreman held in the city. Other cinematic representations include Viva Riva! (2010) by Djo Tunda Wa Munga and Félicité (2017) by Alain Gomis. In 2019, the mini-series The Widow premiered on Amazon Prime and the UK's ITV network, following a woman searching for her husband in Kinshasa after he was presumed dead in a plane crash. The city has also inspired literature: Fiston Mwanza Mujila's Tram 83 captures Kinshasa's nightlife while also examining postcolonial identity and social and economic struggles, whereas In Koli Jean Bofane's Congo Inc.: Bismarck's Testament portrays the city as a microcosm of postcolonial Congo.

==== Museums ====
Located in Kinshasa are the National Museum and the Kinshasa Fine Arts Academy.

==== Visual arts and fashion ====
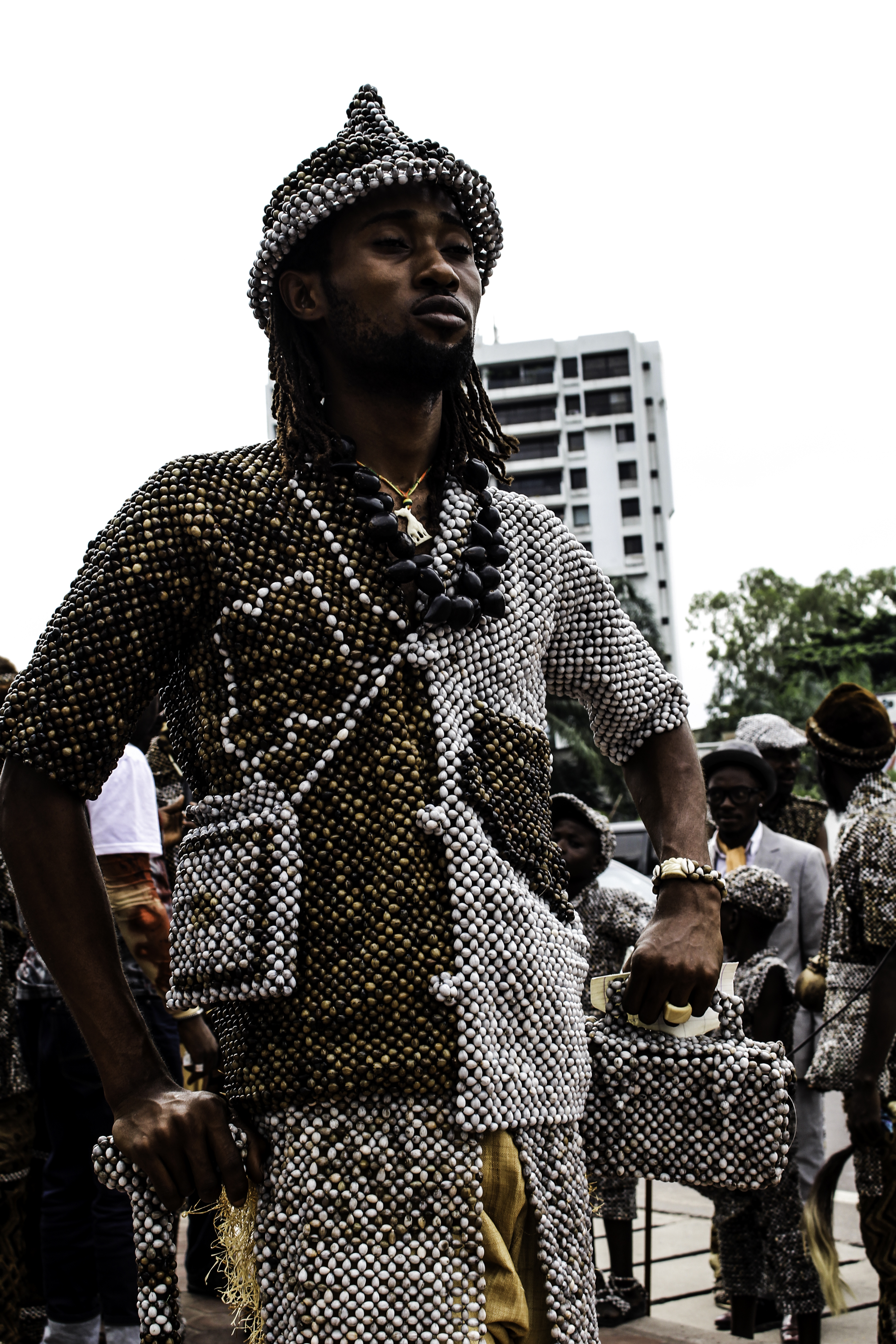
A traditional sapeur dressed in an outfit made from pearls in kinshasa, February 2015

Kinshasa's street art has earned international attention, with artists using murals and graffiti rich in color to convey strong social and political messages across the city. A prominent pop culture figure in Kinshasa is the mikiliste, a stylish, affluent individual who has traveled to Europe, with early representatives including Adrien Mombele, known as Stervos Niarcos, and Papa Wemba. Closely connected to this image is La Sape, a form of modern dandyism that is characterized by extravagant fashion. Photographer Daniele Tamagni's book Gentlemen of Bacongo (2009) captures the distinctive style and personalities of Kinshasa's sapeurs.

==== Martial arts ====
WWE wrestler Shinsuke Nakamura uses a running knee strike, called the Kinshasa, as his finisher, a reference to the eponymous city. The move was previously named as Bomaye (which translated to "kill him") during his time in New Japan Pro Wrestling but was renamed in 2016 when he was signed with the WWE for trademark reasons. Both Bomaye and Kinshasa are homages to Nakamura's mentor, Antonio Inoki, who received Bomaye as a nickname from Muhammad Ali when Inoki and Ali fought in 1976, with Ali first hearing Bomaye in Kinshasa during the Rumble In The Jungle.

=== Media ===
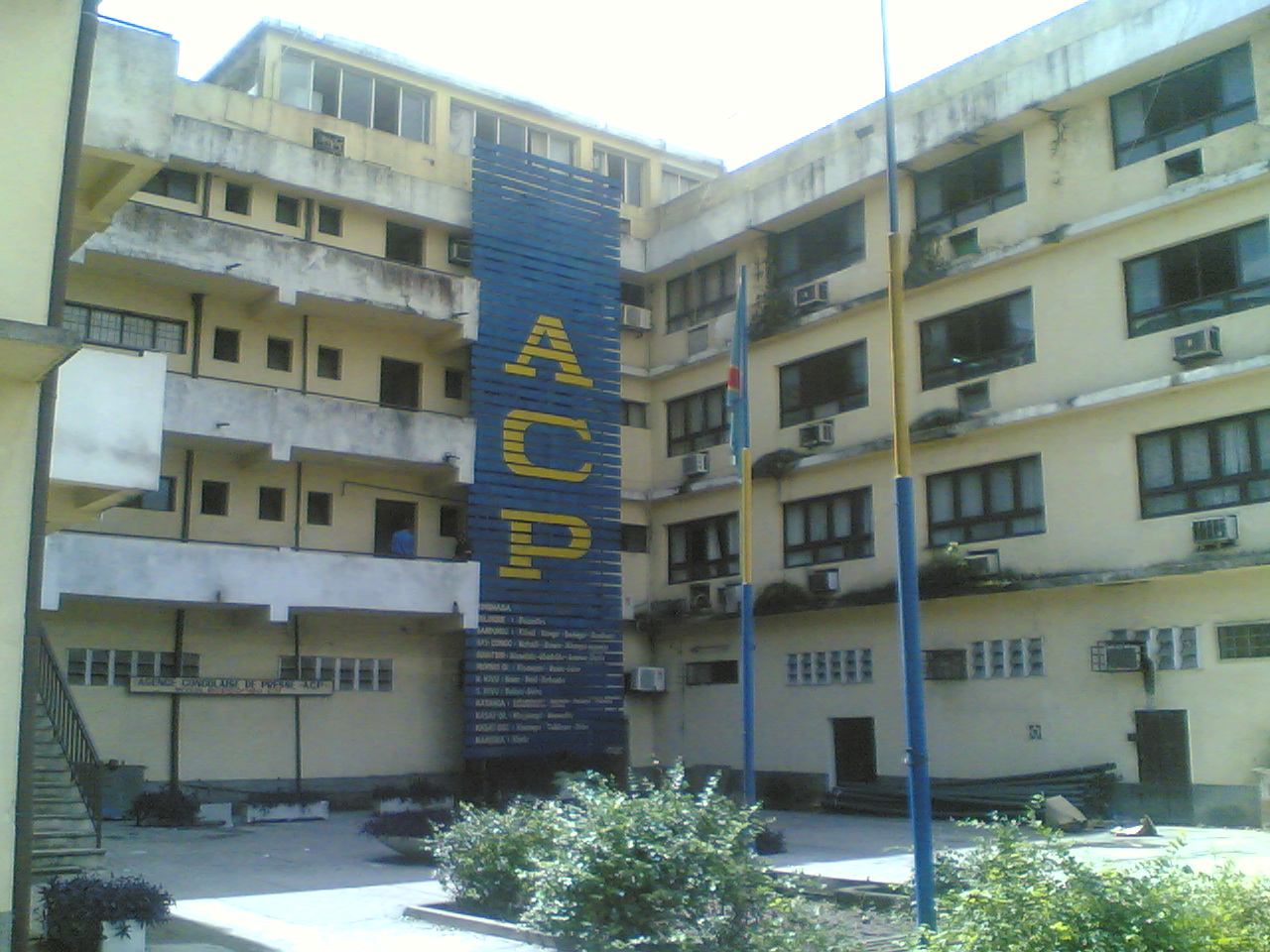
Office of the Agence Congolaise de Presse (ACP)

Kinshasa serves as the nation's principal media hub, hosting the largest concentration of media outlets in the country. The primary languages used in media production are French and Lingala, with other indigenous languages seldom appearing. Press freedom remains limited, with journalism subject to strict control and censorship. The 2023 Press Freedom Index rated the Democratic Republic of the Congo at 48.55%. State-run channels generally provide minimal political content, and restrictive regulations limit investigative journalism. In the early 2000s, especially during the political transition, Kinshasa's media scene grew rapidly. By 2004, the city had 23 radio stations and 26 TV stations, with the number of television broadcasters increasing dramatically to 63 by 2007.

These outlets are primarily commercial, religious, or community-based and are often affiliated, formally or informally, with political figures or parties. For instance, Numerica TV is owned by Kibambi Shintwa and Kabeya Pindi Pasi, both of whom were candidates in the 2006 parliamentary elections. Mirador TV is owned by Michel Ladi Luya, a former Member of Parliament and newspaper publisher. Digital Congo TV was co-founded by Croatian businessman Nicolas Vazonne and Jaynet Kabila, twin sister of then-President Joseph Kabila. Africa TV is associated with Azarias Ruberwa, a former vice president and 2006 presidential candidate, and Eugène Serufuli Ngayabaseka, the then-governor of North Kivu. CCTV (Canal Congo Télévision) and Canal Kin are linked to Jean-Pierre Bemba. While many of these channels deny formal political affiliations, their ownership structures suggest otherwise. Not all stations are politically aligned. Neutral and independent outlets such as Antenne A and Congoweb TV contribute to a more balanced media environment. RTNC1 remains the primary public broadcaster with nationwide reach, while other widely viewed stations include RTGA (Radio Télévision Groupe L'Avenir), Digital Congo TV, Mirador TV, Congoweb TV, and Antenne A.

Several prominent national radio and television stations are headquartered in Kinshasa. The RTNC operates multiple channels, RTNC1, RTNC2, RTNC3, and RTNC4, providing news, cultural programming, and public service broadcasts. The UN-supported Radio Okapi, jointly managed with MONUSCO, is also based in the city and is widely regarded for its balanced reporting. Other notable broadcasters include Top Congo FM, RTGA, Radio Télévision Message de Vie (RTMV), Raga FM, and Digital Congo FM. In addition to these, Kinshasa hosts a wide array of specialized and religious broadcasters, such as Radio Télévision Armée de l'Éternel (RTAE), Radio Télévision Sentinelle (RTS), Canal Chemin de Vérité et Vie (CVV), Radio Télévision Catholique Elikya (RTCE), Radio Parole de l'Éternel (RPE), and Radio Télé Assemblée Chrétienne (RTACK). Community-based stations include Radio Shaloom Racha, Radio 7, Tam Tam Africain, Jo Dacosta FM, Afri Radio, and Mirador FM. International broadcasters such as the BBC (on 92.6 FM), Radio France Internationale (RFI), Africa Radio, China Radio International, and Euronews are also present and broadcast according to the editorial policies of their parent organizations.

The print and digital media sector is equally diverse, with the capital being home to the state-owned news agency Agence Congolaise de Presse (ACP) and a range of newspapers and online platforms. Among the most prominent publications are L'Avenir, L'Observateur, Le Potentiel, Le Phare, Le Soft, La Conscience, La Prospérité, and LeCongolais.

== Sports ==
The exterior of the Stade des Martyrs, the largest sports venue by capacity in DR Congo

Sports, especially football and martial arts are popular in Kinshasa. The city is home to the country's national stadium, the Stade des Martyrs (Stadium of the Martyrs). The Vita Club, Daring Club Motema Pembe and AS Dragons frequently draws large crowds, enthusiastic and sometimes rowdy, to the Stade des Martyrs. Dojos are popular and their owners influential.

In 1974, Kinshasa hosted The Rumble in the Jungle boxing match between Muhammad Ali and George Foreman, in which Ali defeated Foreman, to regain the World Heavyweight title.

== Infrastructure ==
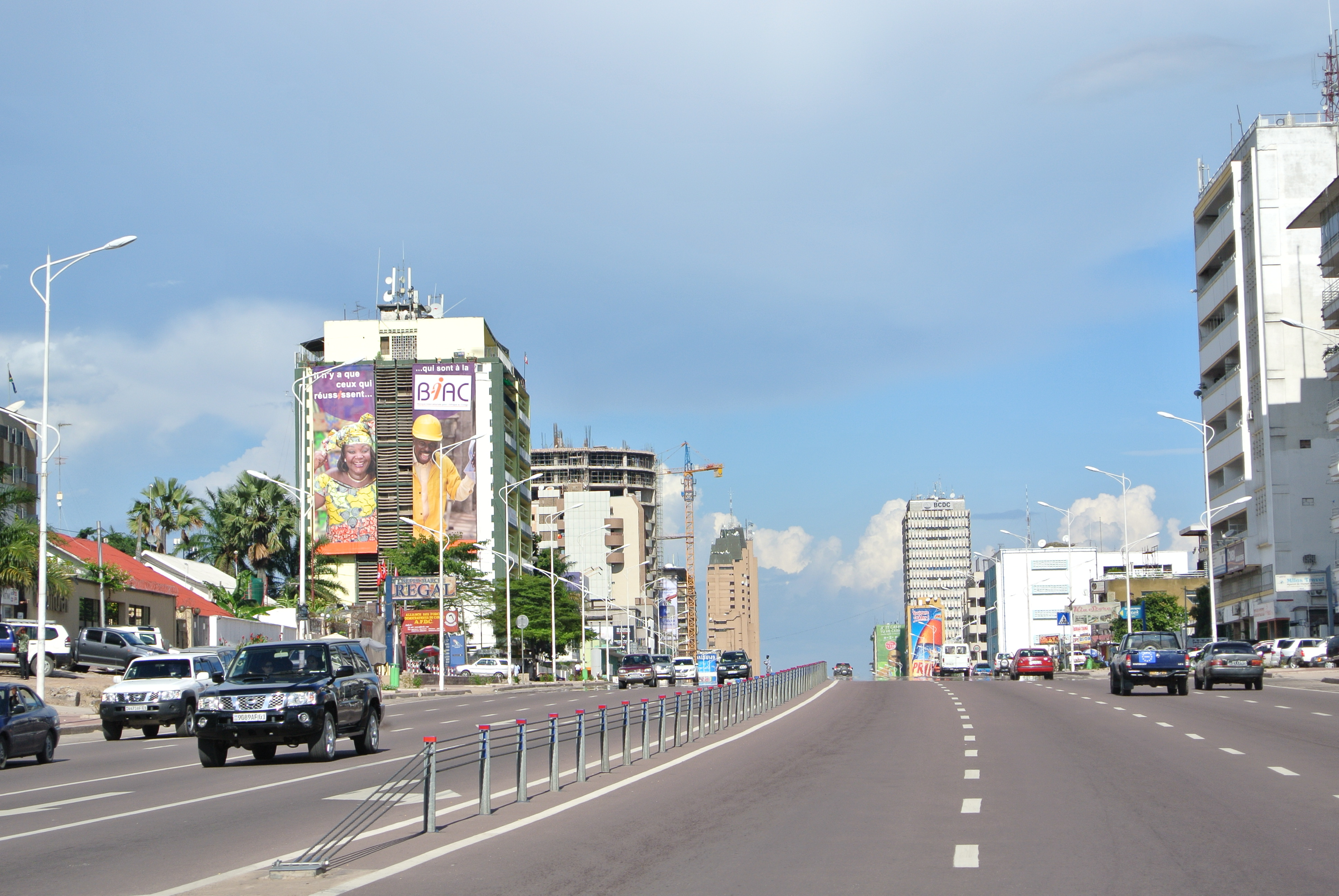
Road of Kinshasa City

The city's infrastructure for running water and electricity is generally in bad shape. The electrical network is in disrepair to the extent that prolonged and periodic blackouts are normal, and exposed lines sometimes electrify pools of rainwater.

Regideso, the national public company with primary responsibility for water supply in the Congo, serves Kinshasa only incompletely, and without uniform quality. Other areas are served by decentralized Associations des Usagers des Réseau d'Eau Potable (ASUREPs). Gombe uses water at a high rate (306 liters per day per inhabitant) compared to other communes (from 71 L/d/i in Kintambo down to 2 L/d/i in Kimbanseke).

The housing market has seen rising prices and rents since the 1980s. Houses and apartments in the central area are expensive, with houses selling for a million dollars and apartments going for $5000 per month. High prices have spread outward from the central area as owners and renters move out of the most expensive part of the city. Gated communities and shopping malls, built with foreign capital and technical expertise, began to appear in 2006. Urban renewal projects have led in some cases to violent conflict and displacement. The high prices leave incoming refugees with few options for settlement besides illegal shantytowns such as Pakadjuma. The Cité du Fleuve, an upmarket residential development, has had significant delays. In 2005, 55% of households had televisions and 43% had mobile phones. 11% had refrigerators and 5% had cars.

=== Transport ===
==== Road ====
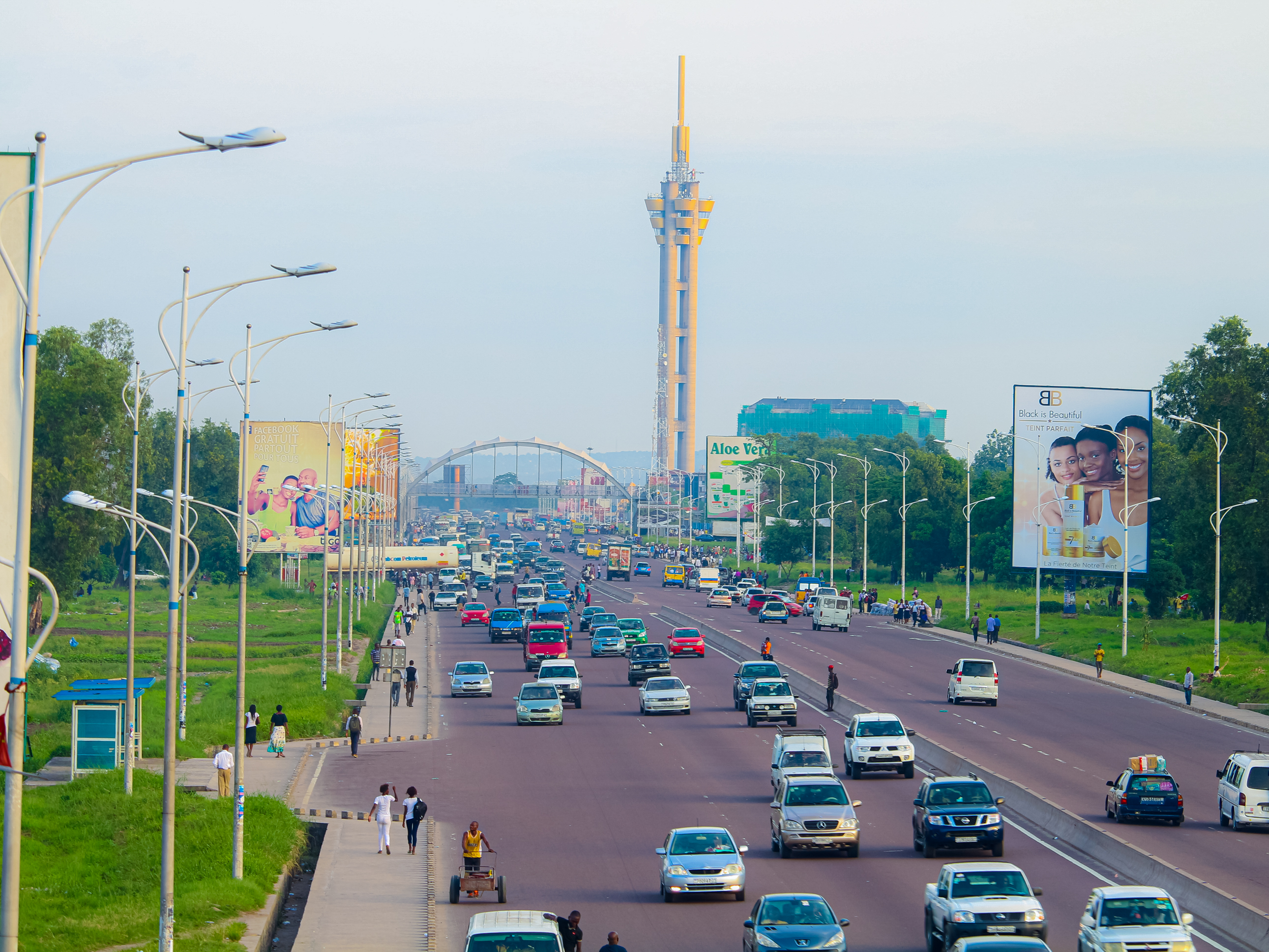
The Boulevard Lumumba

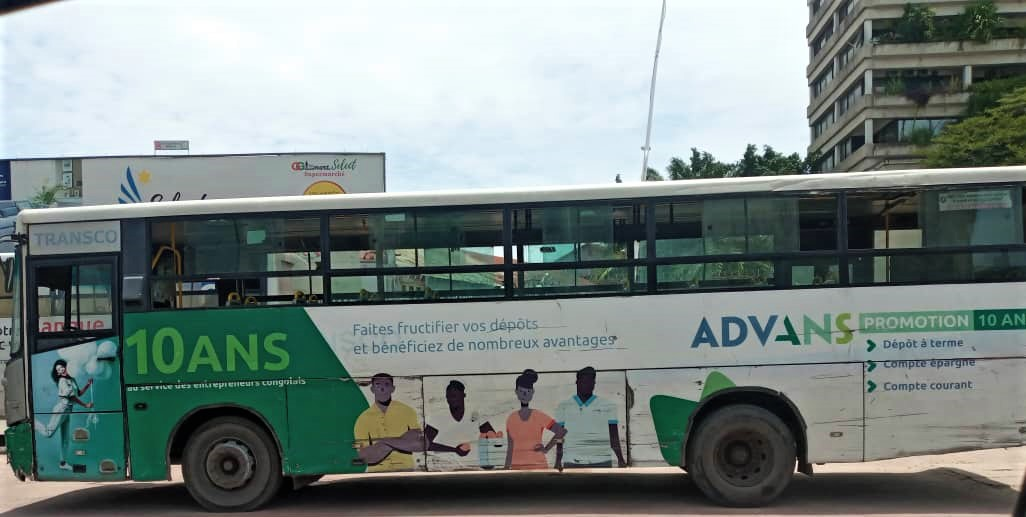
A Transco Bus in 2020

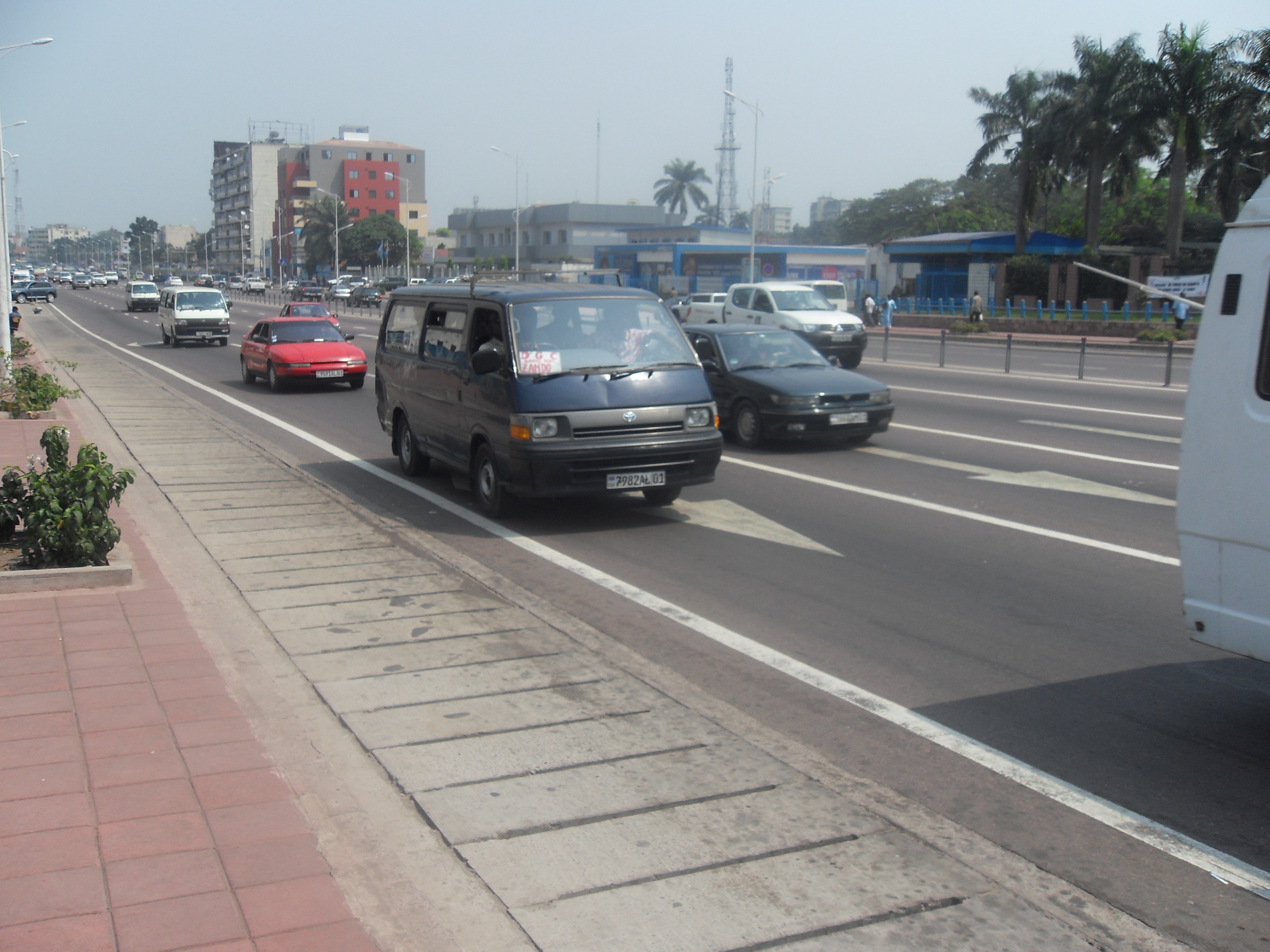
Transport taxis and buses

Kinshasa has about 5,019 km of urban roads, of which only 546 km are paved, as well as 362 km of national roads and 74 km of provincial roads. The city is located along National Road 1, the highway between the provinces of Kongo Central and Haut-Katanga. It connects the capital with other cities in the western and southern DRC, including Lubumbashi. A recent complete reconstruction of the section between Kinshasa and the provinces of Kwango and Kwilu significantly improved road quality and reduced travel time from up to a week down to six hours.

The city's main roads spread from the city center toward the outer parts of the metropolitan area. Lumumba Boulevard runs from N'Djili International Airport to N'Dolo Airport. It is about 25 km long and generally consists of four lanes in each direction in certain sections. Poids Lourds Avenue passes through the industrial and riverside areas of Limete and connects with Boulevard du 30 Juin at 30 June Square. It is approximately 15 km long and has two lanes in each direction between Lumumba Boulevard and the Ndolo level crossing. Luambo Makiadi Avenue, measuring 3.9 km in length and 7 m in width, connects Lumumba Boulevard with the city center. Joseph Kasa-Vubu Avenue covers about 8 km and follows a radial alignment, initially oriented north–south before curving around the city along an east–west route. With a width of approximately 10 m, it is one of the main roads leading out of the city center. Liberation Avenue stretches for about 13 km and connects western Gombe with the southwestern parts of the metropolitan area. It has three lanes in each direction between Moleart Roundabout and Boulevard du 30 Juin and serves as an important entrance to and exit from administrative Gombe. Boulevard du 30 Juin runs east–west through Gombe and passes through its administrative quartiers. At Kintambo Magasin, Matadi Road provides access to the outer parts of Ngaliema. Boulevard du 30 Juin has four lanes in each direction and runs for about 5.5 km between Kinshasa Central Station and Socimat Roundabout. University Avenue provides access to the southern parts of the city and is about 10 km long. It has one lane in each direction along its entire length. Most of these main roads follow north–south routes, creating strong connections across the city in that direction. They also tend to meet toward the northern part of the metropolitan area, while the east–west road network is less developed and works less well. Gombe has one of the city's more developed paved road networks. Boulevard du 30 Juin was modernized during the 2000s and early 2010s, but many of the other roads are in poor condition.

The public bus company for Kinshasa, created in 2003, is Transco (Transport au Congo). Several companies operate registered taxis and taxi-buses, identifiable by their yellow color. In 2022, a new app-based taxi-hailing service known as Yango was introduced in the city. Linked to Russia-based Yandex, the ride-booking and delivery platform gives people another option besides regular taxis, as its app allows passengers to book rides through a mobile application, which provides fare information, driver details, and trip tracking. Other ride-hailing companies operating in Kinshasa included Majaabu Caab, Car Nayo, Cars Express, Heetch RDC, Kin Tai, and Africab. However, in July 2025, authorities banned seven ride-hailing operators for failing to meet the city's requirements, leaving Yango as the only authorized operator.

==== Air ====
The city has two airports: N'djili International Airport (FIH) is the main airport with connections to other African countries as well as to Istanbul, Brussels, Paris and some other destinations. N'Dolo Airport, located close to downtown, is used for domestic flights only with small turboprop aircraft. Several international airlines serve Ndjili Airport including Kenya Airways, South African Airways, Ethiopian Airlines, Brussels Airlines, Air France and Turkish Airlines. An average of ten international flights depart each day from N'djili Airport. A small number of airlines provide domestic service from Kinshasa, for example Congo Airways and CAA. Both offer scheduled flights from Kinshasa to a limited number of cities inside DR Congo.

==== Rail ====
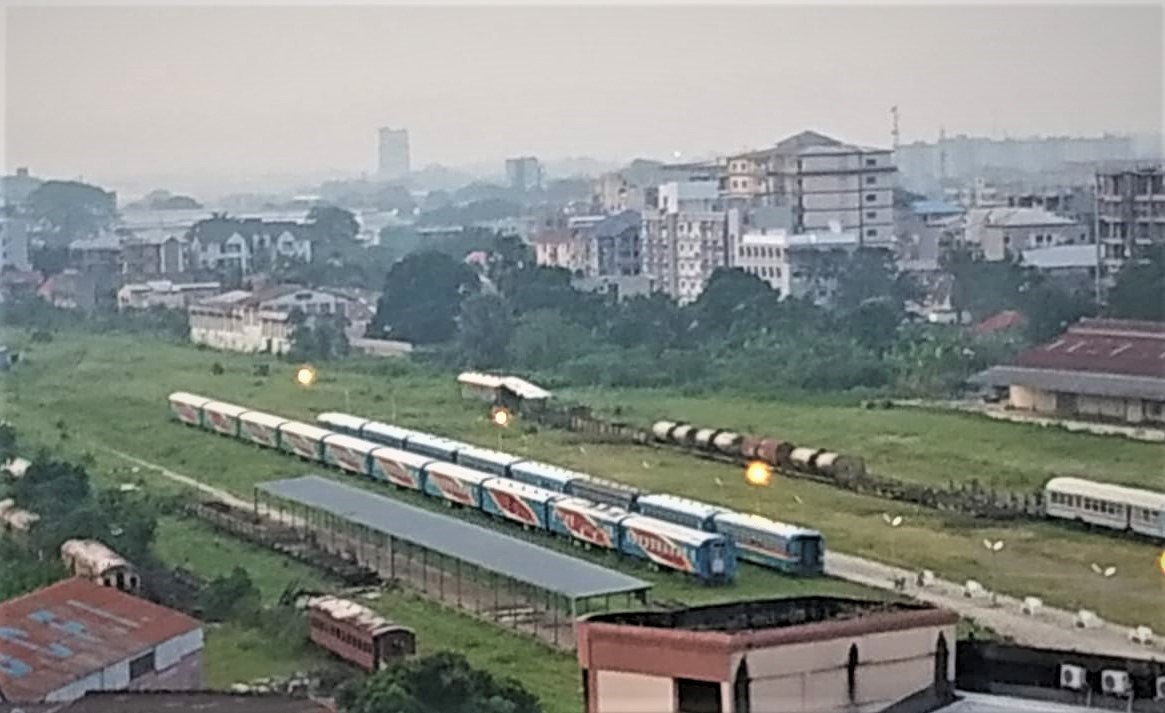
Rolling stock near the Kinshasa Central Station

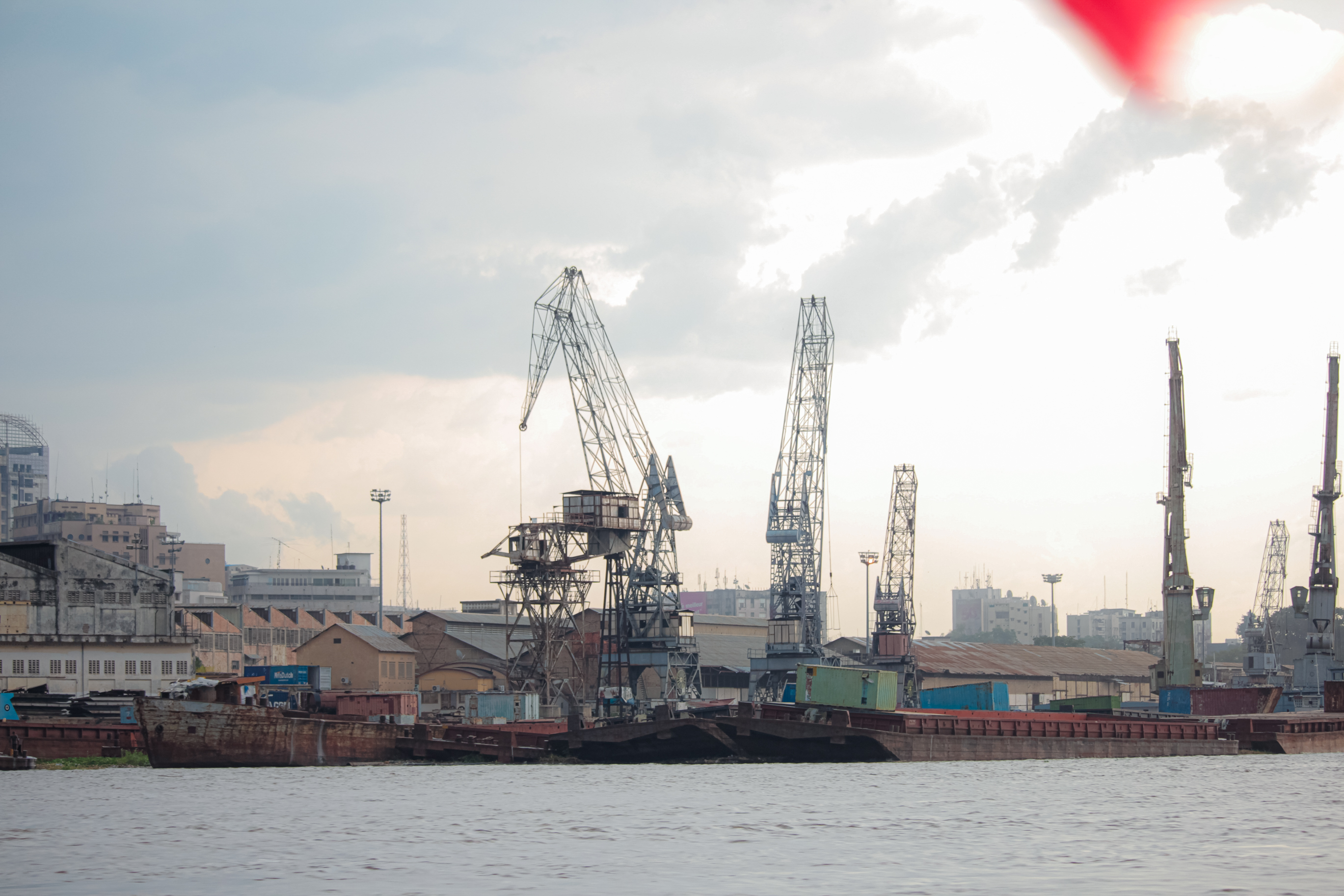
The port of Kinshasa on the Congo River

Plans to build an urban railway system in Kinshasa called MetroKin were announced in 2023. The start of service is not expected until 2026 at the earliest.

The Kinshasa central station is in the riverside commune of Gombe, and is on the Matadi–Kinshasa Railway, a line connecting it with the country's main Atlantic seaport of Matadi and the province of Kongo Central. The railway reopened in 2025 for passenger service multiple times per week, after five years of renovation. Before the reopening, service was provided twice daily along the smaller section between Kinshasa and Kasangulu.

There is no rail direct connection between Kinshasa and the interior of the DRC, though it is historically connected by river transport to Ilebo, Kasaï Province, which is the start of the line south to Lubumbashi and the Zambian border.

==== River ====
Kinshasa is the major river port of the Congo, which handles over two million tons of freight annually. Rivers are the main connection of Kinshasa with much of the country due to the fractured and poor state of the road network, and the limited extent of rail network. The port, called 'Le Beach Ngobila' extends for about 7 km (4 mi) along the river, comprising scores of quays and jetties with hundreds of boats and barges tied up. Ferries cross the river to Brazzaville, a distance of about 4 km (2 mi). River transport also connects to dozens of ports upstream, such as Kisangani and Bangui.

== Social issues ==
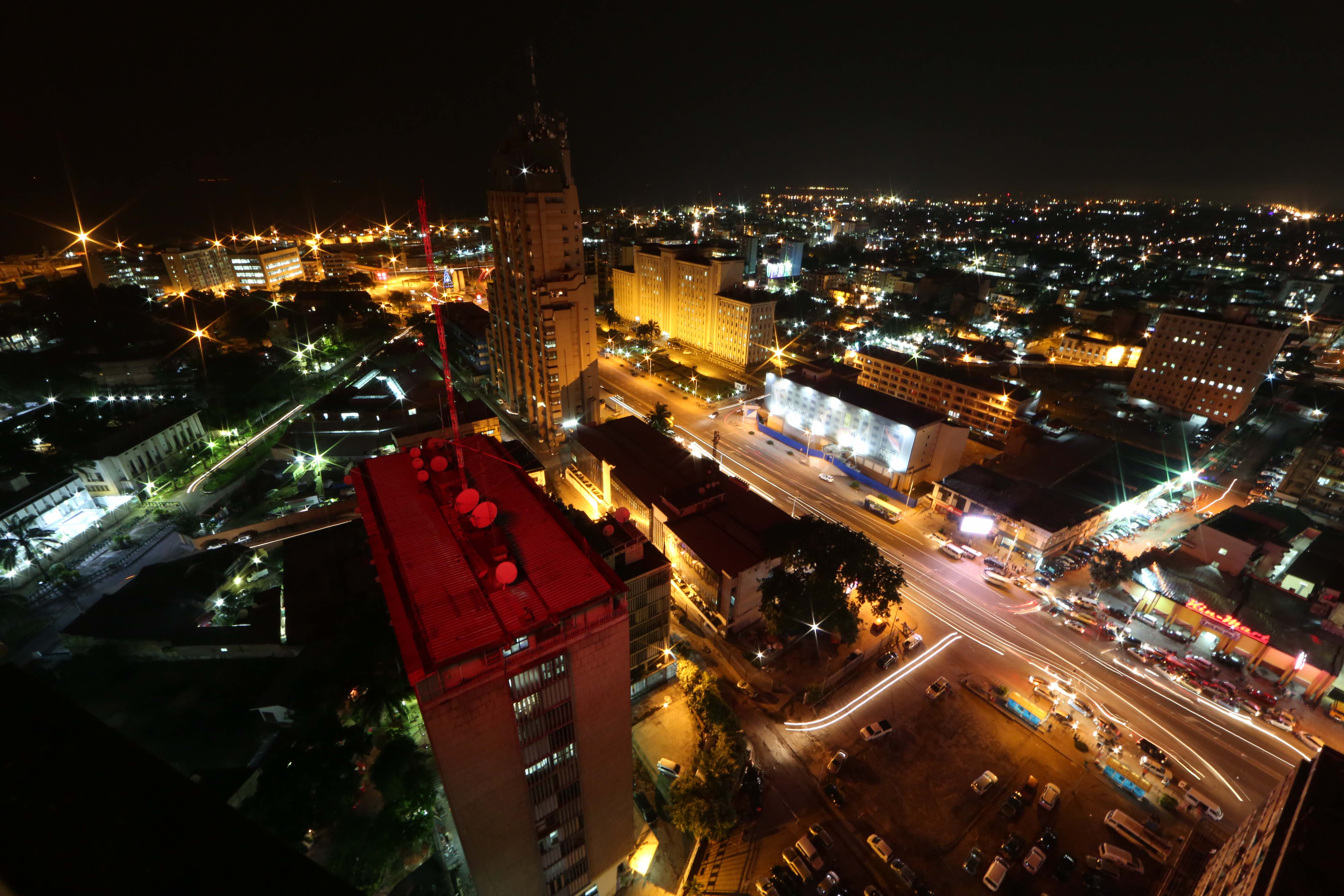
Downtown Kinshasa at night

=== Crime and punishment ===
Since the Second Congo War, the city has been striving to recover from disorder, with many youth gangs living and operating from Kinshasa's poorer areas. The U.S. State Department in 2010 informed travelers that Kinshasa and other major Congolese cities are generally safe for daytime travel, but to beware of robbers, especially in traffic jams and in areas near hotels and stores.

Some sources say that Kinshasa is extremely dangerous, with one source giving a homicide rate of 112 per 100,000 people per year. Another source cites a homicide rate of 12.3 per 100,000. By some accounts, crime in Kinshasa is not so rampant, due to relatively good relations among residents and perhaps to the severity with which even petty crime is punished.

While the military and National Police operate their own jails in Kinshasa, the main detention facility under the jurisdiction of the local courts is the Kinshasa Penitentiary and Re-education center in Makala. This prison houses much more than its nominal capacity of 1,000 inmates. In 2024, the population of Makala Prison was reported at 15,000. The Congolese military intelligence organization, Détection Militaire des Activités Anti-Patrie (DEMIAP) operates the Ouagadougou prison in Kintambo commune with notorious cruelty.

=== Street children ===
In the 2010s, street children, or "Shegués", often orphaned, are subject to abuse by the police and military. Of the estimated 20,000 children living on Kinshasa's streets, almost a quarter are beggars, some are street vendors and about a third have some kind of employment. Some have fled from physically abusive families, notably step-parents, others were expelled from their families as they were believed to be witches, and have become outcasts.

Street children are mainly boys, but the percentage of girls is increasing according to UNICEF. Ndako ya Biso provides support for street children, including overnight accommodation for girls. There are also second generation street children.

These children have been the object of considerable outside study.

== International relations ==
Kinshasa is twinned with:

- (Republic of the Congo) Brazzaville, Republic of Congo
- Brussels, Belgium
- Johannesburg, South Africa
- Ankara, Turkey, since 2005

== See also ==
- Traffic robots in Kinshasa
- Lake Chad replenishment project

=== Films about Kinshasa ===
- Kinshasa Kids
- Kinshasa palace
- Kinshasa Symphony
