= Regideso =

REGIDESO
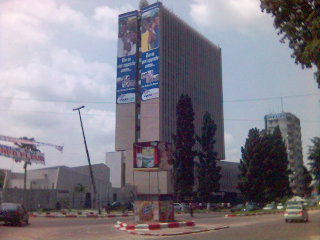
- REGIDESO, January 2006
- Formerly: Société de Distribution d'Eau de Léopoldville
- Company type: Public
- Founded: November 18, 1929; 96 years ago
- Headquarters: Boulevard du 30 Juin, Gombe, Kinshasa, Democratic Republic of the Congo, DRC
- Website: https://regideso.cd/

The Régie de Distribution d'Eau, abbreviated as REGIDESO, is a state-owned utility company located on Boulevard Du 30 Juin, in the Gombe commune of Kinshasa, Democratic Republic of the Congo. It is responsible for producing and distributing water throughout the national territory, encompassing both urban and rural areas. Established in 1929, REGIDESO operates autonomously under the oversight of the Ministry of Energy and the Portfolio.

== Organization and supervision ==
REGIDESO enjoys corporate legal status and is subjected to fiscal oversight by the Ministry of Portfolio, while its technical operations are governed by the Ministry of Energy. It retains an institutional monopoly on the production and distribution of potable water throughout the Democratic Republic of the Congo.

The legal framework guiding REGIDESO is outlined in Law No. 073-026 of 30 July 1973, which delineates the establishment of various governing bodies, including a board of directors, a management board, and a board of auditors. Additionally, Law No. 78-197 of 5 May 1978, enforced under the auspices of Law No. 78-002 of 6 January 1978, prescribes general provisions applicable to public enterprises. Although subject to common law in fiscal matters, REGIDESO is exempt from certain tax obligations, including actual and schedular contributions on income. Moreover, its billing rates are subject to the approval of the Ministry of Economy, which issues these rates through a ministerial decree.

=== Responsibilities and objectives ===
REGIDESO's central mandate involves the administration of water distribution systems, management of water catchments, treatment and delivery of water, establishment of new distribution networks or extensions, and the facilitation of any auxiliary operations directly or indirectly linked to its primary mandate. To fulfill these objectives, REGIDESO adheres to a defined protocol that includes the expansion of distribution networks, customer and subscriber identification, and metering services. Importantly, it holds a near-complete monopoly on the exploitation and distribution of drinking water, except in regions where it lacks a presence or through special agreements with the State.

== History ==
=== Colonial era (1929–1959) ===
REGIDESO, formerly called Société de Distribution d'Eau de Léopoldville, was established on 18 November 1929, with its headquarters in Brussels, to provide drinking water to the colonial settlers. Urban authorities in Boma, Matadi, Léopoldville (now Kinshasa), Coquilhatville (now Mbandaka), and Stanleyville (now Kisangani) were entrusted with operating, developing, and modernizing water distribution.

Recognizing the exigency for a structured water distribution framework, the Belgian Congo colonial administration promulgated a Royal Decree (Arrêté Royal) on 28 March 1933, which formally authorized the establishment of a water distribution company devoted to the colony. This foundational decree was further augmented in 1939 by another royal edict, which instituted the Régie de Distribution d'Eau et d'Electricité du Congo Belge et Ruanda-Urundi (REGIDESO). The newly formed entity was conferred with legal personality, which allowed it greater autonomy in its management and expanding its operational remit to include both water and electricity distribution across the Belgian Congo and Ruanda-Urundi, with its headquarters located at Rue Marie de Bourgogne 30, Brussels. During these early years, REGIDESO laid down critical infrastructure, including water-treatment facilities in Léopoldville. The facilities at Kinsuka along the Lukunga River and at Ngaliema Bay near the Congo River were instrumental in supplying water to the growing population of Léopoldville. However, initially designed with a projected operational lifespan of approximately thirty years, these facilities soon revealed the first signs of infrastructural deficiencies, foreshadowing the challenges that would beset the company in subsequent decades.

By the mid-20th century, the Belgian Congo's electricity and water distribution infrastructure was developing rapidly, though geographically uneven, development across its provinces. Reports from the United States Department of Commerce in 1955 highlighted the disparity in electric power distribution across the Belgian Congo, with Équateur Province being notably under-served. During this period, REGIDESO's mandate extended beyond water distribution, encompassing electricity generation and distribution, especially in urban centers such as Coquilhatville. REGIDESO's portfolio included the management of several power plants across the colony, including diesel-electric and hydroelectric installations. For instance, in the Bas-Congo region (present-day Kongo Central), the M'Pozo hydroelectric plant was integrated into REGIDESO's operations in 1948 to fulfill the energy requirements of Matadi, the principal maritime gateway of the Belgian Congo. Additionally, the Sanga hydroelectric power plant near Léopoldville, constructed by the Société des Forces Hydro-Electriques de Sanga, emerged as a significant energy provider to the region. The plant housed six generators with a combined capacity of 10,500 kilowatts, part of which was supplied to the Societe Textile Africaine to operate its textile mill in Léopoldville. The Sanga power plant supplied electricity to the Société Coloniale d'Electricite, which facilitated energy distribution throughout Léopoldville. However, the escalating demand for power in Léopoldville soon outstripped the capacity of the existing infrastructure, necessitating the construction of the Zongo power plant, which commenced in 1951 and was completed in 1955, featuring three units each with a capacity of 10,500 kilowatts. Meanwhile, in other provinces, such as Kasaï and Kivu, REGIDESO continued to expand its operations, establishing new thermal and hydroelectric power plants to service the region's principal urban centers. For instance, REGIDESO has operated a diesel-electric power plant in Luluabourg (now Kananga) since 1950, comprising three units with a combined capacity of 860 kilowatts, one of which served as a reserve unit. In Kivu Province, the facilities at Bukavu, operated by REGIDESO, included a hydroelectric plant with three units totaling 285 kilowatts and a diesel-electric plant with five units with an aggregate capacity of 1,575 kilowatts, of which a 400-kilowatt unit was held in reserve.

=== Post-colonial Congo, expansion of operations and water treatment facilities ===
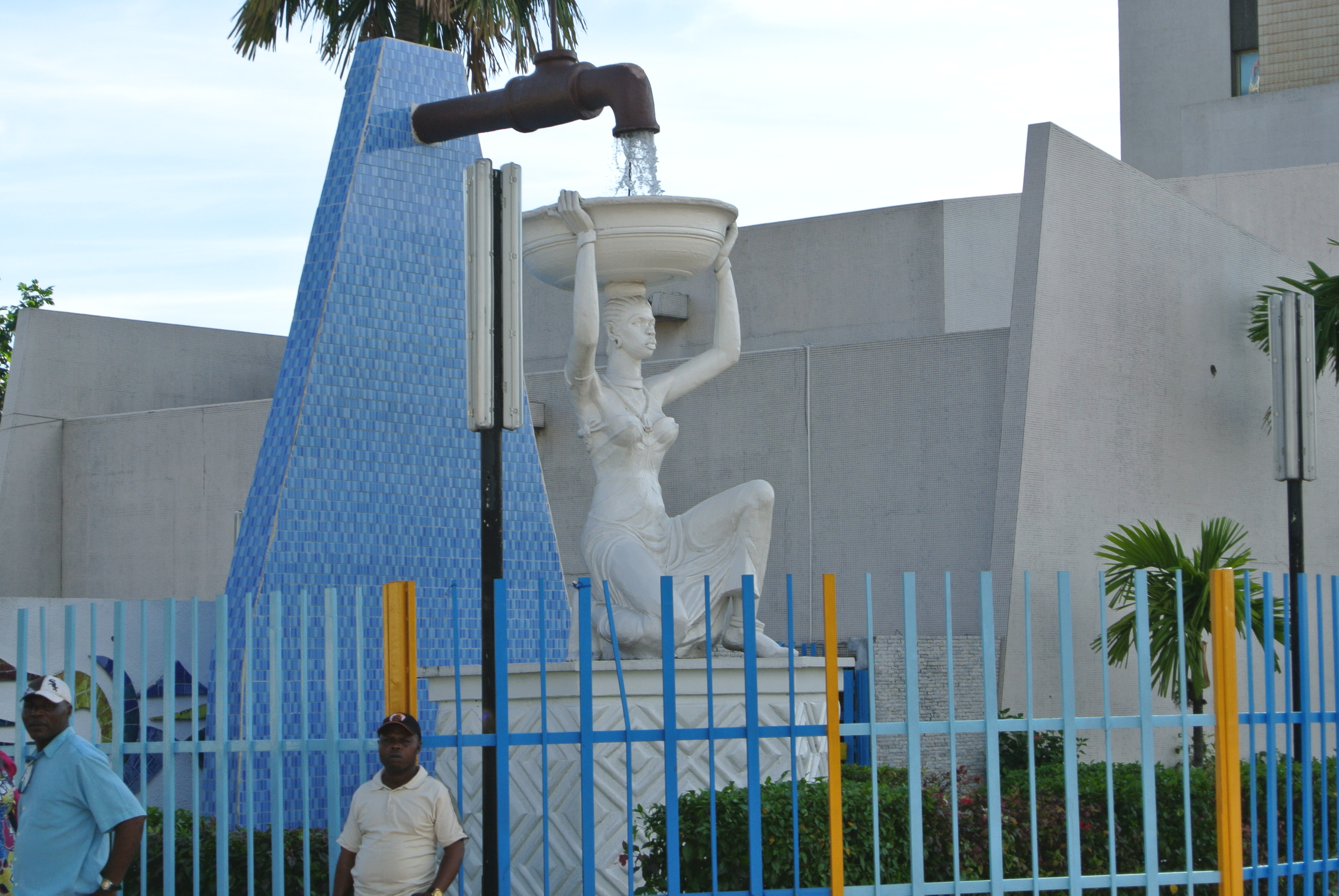
Fountain in front of REGIDESO's headquarters in Kinshasa

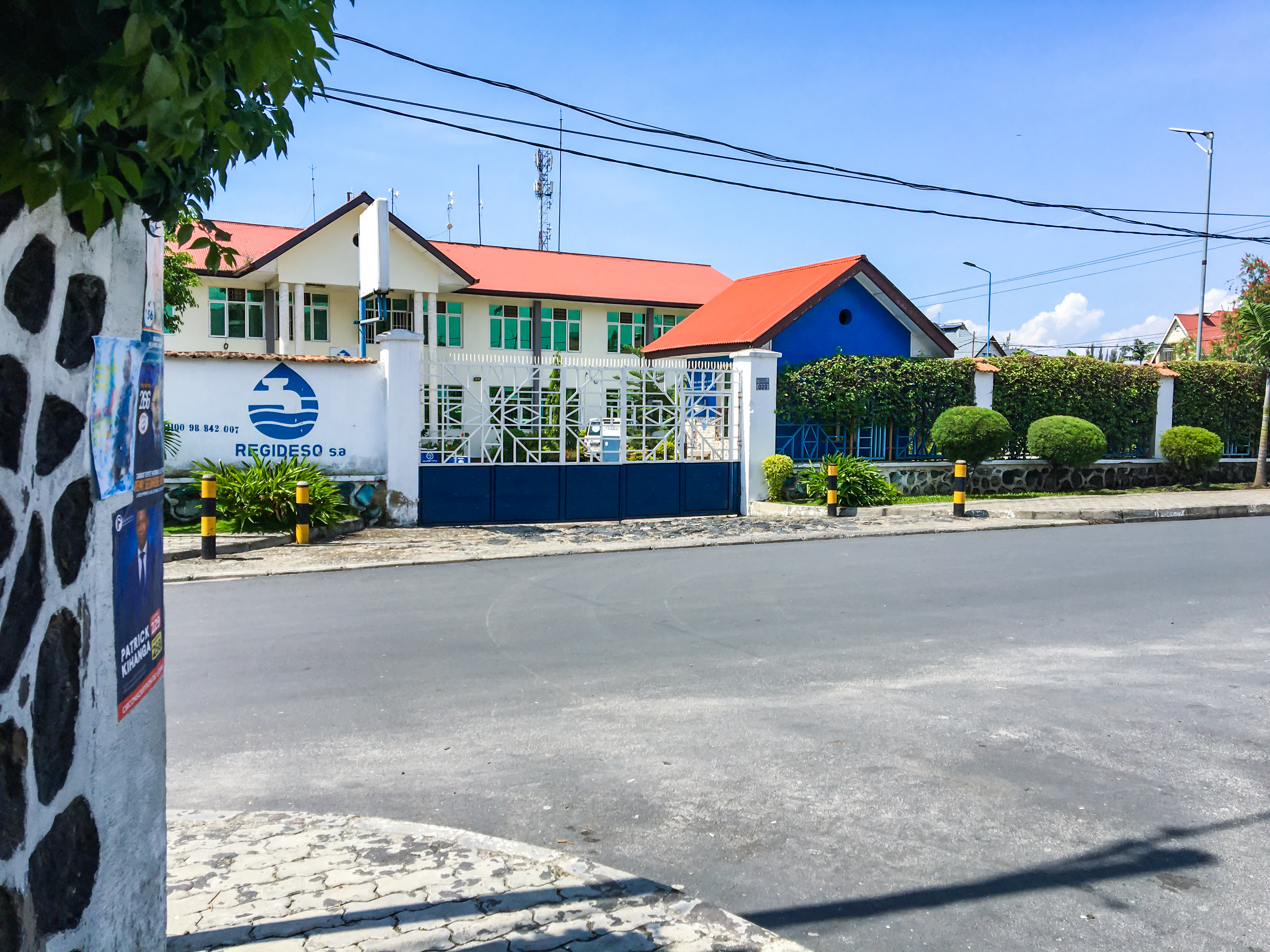
View of REGIDESO office in Goma

Following the country's independence, the newly established entity underwent significant changes. The decree of 25 August 1966 nullified the decree of 30 December 1939 and established a new public institution named Régie de Distribution d'Eau (REGIDESO), headquartered in Gombe, Kinshasa. The scope of operation and registered office were revised, while the corporate mandate remained broadly consistent. The new company continued to manage water distribution services, ancillary facilities for water supply, pumping, water sterilization, operation of power stations, and electricity distribution networks solely on behalf of the Republic of Zaire. The management of REGIDESO was privatized two years after its creation through Ordinance-Law n° 68 - 116 of 29 March 1968. The management was entrusted to the Belgian public limited company "La COMMIERE" for five years, but the contract was abrogated after two years due to legal disputes involving Lorhon. However, in 1978, the government decided to transfer all operations related to the production and distribution of electrical energy to the national electricity company Société Nationale d'Électricité (SNEL), effective from 1 January 1979. Consequently, REGIDESO refocused its efforts on the operation and expansion of the potable water sector.

By 1985, the water infrastructure in Kinshasa, particularly the original two water-treatment facilities, had become severely dilapidated. A third station, erected on the Ndjili River at Kingabwa (Limete commune), was conceived to augment the aging first two, but financial constraints necessitated the project's phased completion, resulting in significant delays. Recourse to financial assistance from various Western nations was adroitly maneuvered by Mobutu Sese Seko to diversify his external support base. It also served as a mechanism for the West to recycle its petrodollars while replenishing the coffers of large construction and public works companies. Three additional stations were eventually constructed: one at Maluku, another at Kinkole, and a third at Midendi. The latter was intended to supply the agro-pastoral farms near Kimbondo, as well as the areas of Mitende and Mont Ngafula. The World Bank provided assistance to replace the two original stations and to supply large-diameter pipes for distribution, but work was halted in 1997 when the Bank severed its relations with the post-Mobutu government. REGIDESO's production/distribution capacity remains inadequate to meet the city's needs.

=== Water shortages, plans for pumping stations and international aid disruptions ===
As a state-run monopoly, REGIDESO relied on government funding for maintenance and new investments. Despite rhetorical commitments from Mobutu regarding the importance of water infrastructure—particularly after the 1980 United Nations Water Conference in Mar del Plata designated the 1980s as the Decade of Water—the sector received no substantial government investment. International donors financed many significant water development projects, such as those in Kasai Occidental, Maniema, and Équateur provinces. During the 1990s, the company operated tanker trucks to transport water to city areas not served by the conduit system. However, during this period, it was estimated that only one-third of Kinshasa's population had access to water at home, a decrease from an estimated 50 percent in 1986. REGIDESO's six water treatment facilities were producing approximately 400,000 cubic meters of water per day. However, daily water demand far exceeded production capacity, with estimated requirements reaching 1.2 million cubic meters by 1990 and projected to rise to 2.4 million cubic meters by the year 2000. To address this shortfall, REGIDESO planned to construct three new pumping stations. The first station, located on the Lukaya River in the Mont Ngafula commune, was expected to have a capacity of 110,000 cubic meters. However, it was never operational due to the looting of equipment and materials in 1991. Although REGIDESO funded the project itself, it lacked the financial resources to complete it, and promised state subsidies never materialized. A second station was planned for Ndjili with French financing, but it was also abandoned when France suspended development aid to Mobutu in October 1991 after years of lucrative contracts for French companies. Similarly, a third station, also planned for Ndjili with Japanese funding, was never realized due to the September 1991 lootings, which caused a shipment of equipment en route to Matadi to be diverted at sea.

In North Kivu, REGIDESO received support from the International Committee of the Red Cross (ICRC) and the Service National d'Hydraulique Rurale (SNHR) to address severe water shortages exacerbated by the First and Second Congo Wars. SNHR's efforts primarily focused on rural areas like Rutshuru and Walikale territories, while REGIDESO worked to restore potable water services in urban centers like Goma. During Laurent-Désiré Kabila's presidency, approximately 80 percent of the national budget was allocated to the war effort, severely limiting investment in public services, including REGIDESO.

=== Recent developments ===
In May 2004, a water treatment plant in Isiro that had been destroyed during the Second Congo War was rehabilitated by a team of technicians from Kisangani. However, by September of that year, Kisangani was facing a chlorine shortage, despite repeated distress signals from the local station to REGIDESO's headquarters in Kinshasa. Additional looting of REGIDESO facilities occurred in Kisangani's Lubunga commune, and Kalemie experienced a cessation of water supply from REGIDESO. In March 2005, the European Union financed the installation of REGIDESO pipelines in Bunia to replace outdated steel pipes originally installed in 1954, with the total project cost amounting to $13,780. Additionally, in July 2005, REGIDESO installed new meters in Lubumbashi to end flat-rate billing and prevent water wastage. Likewise, in Kinshasa, new pipelines were laid to meet increasing demand, and in Kikwit, a new pumping system was installed. This system, which provided 109 standpipes in Kazamba commune, enabled residents to purchase fuel for generators and access water independently.

By 2006, REGIDESO had embarked on further modernization efforts, including the construction of a turbine in Mbuji-Mayi to ensure energy autonomy for water pumping stations. In December of the same year, after years of systemic water shortages, REGIDESO successfully operationalized the Lukaya power station, restoring water supplies to the underserved communes of Mont Ngafula, Selembao, and Ngaliema. However, financial challenges persisted, and in 2007, civil society groups in Kikwit vehemently opposed REGIDESO's decision to increase water tariffs, arguing that the burden of fuel costs for generator-powered standpipes disproportionately fell on the population. In May 2007, over 30,000 inhabitants in Kiliba had been deprived of potable water for nearly a year, and in Butembo, pervasive water shortages persisted, as REGIDESO's antiquated systems struggled to meet demand. That same year, efforts were made to rehabilitate the N'djili treatment plant, replacing a corroded 32-year-old collector. Additionally, the Societé Minière de Bakwanga (MIBA) acquired a 9-ton rotor to boost electrical production in Mbuji-Mayi, supplying REGIDESO with more consistent electricity for its water treatment operations. In Kananga, REGIDESO's inadequacy forced 80% of the population to rely on spring water. Meanwhile, in Gemena, the national deputy Minister of Energy oversaw the reactivation of REGIDESO's services after a decade of dysfunction, during which time the populace had relied on artesian wells. However, challenges persisted in locales like Kamina, where SNEL severed the electricity supply to REGIDESO's water pumping station over a payment dispute for a new circuit breaker.

The issue of inadequate drinking water resurfaced in several neighborhoods in Goma, affecting over 80% of REGIDESO subscribers, following a fallen tree that disrupted SNEL's medium-voltage line, which powered the Lake Kivu water catchment plant. In September 2007, REGIDESO in Goma resorted to chlorinating water from the shores of Lake Kivu to meet local demands. The same month, REGIDESO inaugurated a thermal power station to mitigate power shortages at MIBA. In October 2007, the European Development Fund (EDF) provided the DRC with water purification chemicals, in a donation worth over €137 million, including equipment for distribution networks. REGIDESO launched an ambitious project to increase the capacity of its N'djili unit in Kinshasa, with an anticipated output of 110,000 cubic meters of water. By December 2007, new water pipes had been installed in the Bandalungwa commune, financed by the European Union. REGIDESO's acquisition of 40 cubic meters of diesel-powered generator in February 2008 supplied drinking water to the inhabitants of Mwene-Ditu in the Lomami Province three times a week.

Further achievements were recorded in March 2008, with 16 public drinking fountains inaugurated in Kikwit for €28,583 (US$44,305). In Gbadolite, REGIDESO received essential equipment, including 700 valves and 300 taps, courtesy of its general management in August 2008. The European Development Fund financed the rehabilitation of Kinshasa's Kinsuka water station in the Ngaliema commune, while the French Veolia Water Force Foundation allocated over US$200,000 to improve drinking water access in Kalemie, combating cholera in the region.
