= Kokolo Military Camp =

Military base in Bandalungwa, Kinshasa

Lieutenant-Colonel Kokolo Camp
- Kokolo, Bandalungwa, Kinshasa

Site information
- Type: Military base
- Owner: Government of the Democratic Republic of the Congo
- Operator: Armed Forces of the Democratic Republic of the Congo
- Controlled by: Armed Forces of the Democratic Republic of the Congo
- Condition: Operational

Location
- Area: 161 hectares (1.610 km^{2})

Site history
- Built: 1924; 102 years ago

Garrison information
- Occupants: FARDC units; Central Military Hospital of Kokolo; FARDC logistical and training units; Congolese National Police elements; National Service (Service National) detachments

Lieutenant-Colonel Kokolo Camp (French: Camp militaire Lieutenant-Colonel Kokolo), often shortened as Kokolo Military Camp (Camp militaire Kokolo) or Kokolo Camp, is one of the main military installations of the Armed Forces of the Democratic Republic of the Congo (FARDC), located in the Kokolo quartier of Bandalungwa, Kinshasa. The camp is bounded to the north by Sergeant Moke and Haumba avenues, to the south by Kasa-Vubu Avenue, to the east by a public road and the Makusa quartier, and to the west by Pierre Mulele Avenue. Covering an area of approximately 161 hectares, excluding the Monganga, Kalicack, Music School, and logistics base zones, it serves as a major logistical, residential, and training center, as well as housing military personnel and their families.

Established during the Belgian colonial period and constructed in 1924, the camp was initially known as Camp Léopold II before being renamed in 1960 following Congolese independence in honor of Lieutenant Colonel Kokolo. Its legal status was later clarified in the post-Mobutu Sese Seko period through Ministerial Decree No. 0035/90 of 29 August 1999, which formally established the camp's concession within the Funa (Bandalungwa) and Lukunga (Gombe) land jurisdictions.

== Geography ==
Kokolo Military Camp covers a total area of 161.39 hectares, excluding the Monganga, Kalicack, Music School, and logistics base zones. In the post-Mobutu era, the camp's land tenure was formally defined by Ministerial Decree No. 0035/90 of 29 August 1999, which established the concession across the Funa (Bandalungwa) and Lukunga (Gombe) jurisdictions.

Climatically, the camp falls within Kinshasa's tropical climate, marked by high temperatures averaging 25 °C annually and humid conditions with approximately 1,400 mm of rainfall per year, distributed across a rainy season from late September to May, peaking in April (16%) and November (18%), and a dry season extending from June to September.

Geologically, the surface formations of the Kinshasa plain exhibit limited variation, with the area predominantly composed of sandy or silty soils, with a few protrusions or outcrops of "polymorphic sandstones" or "soft sandstones".

== Administration and demographics ==
The camp is composed of 21 quartiers (neighborhoods) allocated between officers and first-, second-, and third-class non-commissioned officers and enlisted ranks. Administratively, it falls under the authority of the Commander of the Central Camps Group (commandant de groupement des camps centre), which also includes the following extensions: including Loano quartier, Ndolo Prison, Koweit, the Institute of Medical Education (IEM; Institut d'Enseignement médical), Kalicack, Munganga, and Mbandaka. A population census conducted in 2005 recorded 33,675 inhabitants within the camp, while estimates in 2022 placed the population at approximately 40,000. The camp residents, who are predominantly military families, engage in agricultural and community initiatives.

=== Structure ===
The camp serves multiple core FARDC functions, notably providing accommodation for military personnel and their families through extensive residential infrastructure, acting as a central logistical base for the coordination of national military operations, and serving as a center for training and organizational activities that bring together active forces, including the police and the national service. Housing within the camp differs according to rank and status, with officers' quartiers featuring single-family houses of one to four bedrooms, typically including a living room, bathroom, toilet, storage space, garage, and occasionally an annex, while other sectors contain prefabricated houses with two or three bedrooms and standard amenities.

Hôpital Militaire Central

Additional housing arrangements include semi-detached houses of two or three bedrooms, some equipped with kitchens and others without, particularly in 21 quartier, as well as apartment blocks comprising 10 to 13 units, each with a bedroom and living room, often supplemented by a designated apartment with a kitchen. Enlisted personnel quartiers are also supported by shared facilities such as sanitary blocks, communal kitchens, and hangars, alongside various administrative buildings.

The camp also contains health, educational, religious and sports facilities, as well as wastewater management systems. It houses the Central Military Hospital of Lieutenant-Colonel Kokolo Camp (hôpital militaire central du camp lieutenant-colonel Kokolo), commonly known as the Central Military Hospital (Hôpital Militaire Central; HMC), which treats patients with a range of conditions, particularly road traffic accident victims and people wounded in war.

== History ==
Lieutenant-Colonel Kokolo Camp was constructed in 1924 during the Belgian colonial period and was initially known as Camp Léopold II. The site was intended to serve as a major garrison and logistical center for colonial forces, and although completed in the 1920s, the camp was formally inaugurated much later, on 8 July 1956.

Following the independence of the Belgian Congo in 1960, the camp was renamed Lieutenant-Colonel Kokolo Camp (Camp militaire Lieutenant-Colonel Kokolo) in tribute to Justin Kokolo-Longo. In the post-Mobutu period, the legal status of the site was formalized when the concession known as "Camp Lieutenant Colonel Kokolo" was officially established by Ministerial Decree No. 0035/90 of 29 August 1999, which defined its land tenure within the jurisdictions of Funa (Bandalungwa) and Lukunga (Gombe). Since independence, Lieutenant-Colonel Kokolo Camp has served as a central base for successive Congolese armed forces, including the Armée nationale congolaise (ANC), the Forces armées zaïroises (FAZ) during the Zaire period, and the Forces armées congolaises (FAC) under Laurent-Désiré Kabila, before its integration into the reformed Armed Forces of the Democratic Republic of the Congo (FARDC).
