= Pan African Chamber of Commerce and Industry =

Pan African Chamber of Commerce and Industry (PACCI) is a business support body representing national Chambers of Commerce and private businesses from across the continent. Re-incorporated in March 2010, the PACCI has the status of an international nongovernmental organization. The PACCI works with international organizations, media entities, policy-makers and through its national member chambers with African national governments, to help African businesses to foster sustainable economic growth, entrepreneurship and prosperity.

The PACCI is based in Addis Ababa, Ethiopia, home of the African Union and the United Nations United Nations Economic Commission for Africa. As of February 2017, Kebour Ghenna serves as the Executive Director.

== Leadership ==
- President: Ali Adji Mahamat SEID
- Vice President: Albert Yuma Mulimbi
- Chief gender officer: Nana Wanjau
- Board member: Joyce Waiyego Mwangi
- Board member: Clement Osie Amoako

== External link ==
Official website
