= Solange Kwale =

Congolese civic figure

Solange Kwale Dangba, sometimes referred to by the nickname Ya Kwale, is a journalist and politician in the Democratic Republic of the Congo.

== Life ==
Kwale graduated in journalism at the Institut supérieur de traducteurs et interprètes (ISTI) in Brussels. She was the host of Mpifo, the first political television show in the Lingala language. After Joseph Kabila won the 2006 elections, she interviewed Jean-Pierre Bemba, who accused Kabila of corruption. Government forces raided Kwale's office and she went into hiding for two months. She returned after friends with connections to Kabila's government told her that the president no longer considered her a threat.

In the 2018 general election Kwale stood as a candidate contesting the Lukunga constituency. but was unsuccessful.

The women's website Pourelle.info included Kwale in their 2021 list of fifty inspirational women from the DRC.
