= TEXAF =

Belgian company operating in the DR Congo

Société Financière et de Gestion TEXAF TEXAF
- Formerly: Société Textile Africaine
- Type: Public
- Traded as: EBR: TEXF
- ISIN: BE0974317444
- Industry: Diversified investments
- Founded: 14 August 1925; 101 years ago
- Founder: Henri Lagache; Victor Lagache; Léon Lagache; Edmond Lagache; Valère Lecluse; Joseph Dieudonné Rhodius; Robert Pflieger; Louis Eloy; Fernand Vigneron
- Headquarters: Avenue Louise 130A, Brussels, Belgium
- Area served: Democratic Republic of the Congo
- Services: Real estate development; industrial quarrying and construction materials; digital services
- Website: https://www.texaf.be/fr

TEXAF (officially Société Financière et de Gestion TEXAF) is a Belgian investment company listed on Euronext, with diversified operations in the Democratic Republic of the Congo spanning real estate, industry, and digital sectors. With its corporate headquarters situated at Avenue Louise 130A in Brussels, TEXAF traces its origins to 14 August 1925, when it was founded in the then-Belgian Congo as Société Textile Africaine by a consortium of Belgian industrialists. The company grew rapidly, branching into sectors such as cotton cultivation, energy production, and transportation logistics, and by 1928, it held the ninth-largest market capitalization among Belgian-Congolese companies before later co-founding the Société Hydro-électrique de Sanga.

By 1930, TEXAF dominated regional cotton production and vast agricultural projects including experimental concessions and even elephant domestication. Despite industrial dominance by 1930, the global economic crisis and overexpansion led to major losses. TEXAF restructured in the 1930s, spinning off subsidiaries such as Usines Textiles de Léopoldville (UTEXLÉO, textiles), Société Immobilière, Agricole et Forestière du Congo (IMAFOR, real estate and agriculture), and transferring its maritime and hydrological operations to governmental authorities. The company was transformed into a holding under Crédit Anversois, which collapsed in 1939, resulting in its TEXAF shares being passed to SOPABEL. The advent of World War II interrupted Crédit Anversois' liquidation proceedings, leaving UTEXLÉO encumbered by significant debt obligations, although it maintained industrial productivity. From 1951–1960, TEXAF disbursed dividends amounting to 360.2 million Belgian francs and expanded manufacturing capabilities through modernization. UTEXLÉO diversified its portfolio with factories for blankets (Socotex), sacks (TISSACO), hosiery (Bonneterie Africaine), and laundry services (Blanchisserie de la Gombe), while expanding into construction materials with firms like Bricongo and Carricongo. By 1960, UTEXLÉO was ranked as the 31st largest corporate entity in the Congo, with assets worth 220 million Belgian francs.

In 1974, UTEXLÉO was nationalized and renamed UTEXCO under Zaire's Authenticité campaign. TEXAF regained full control of UTEXCO by 1976 despite failed ownership transfer negotiations. It re-entered cotton production in 1978 with a 25% stake in Cotonnière du Kasai-Maniema, amid the collapse of state-run supply chains. In the 1980s, TEXAF raised its stake in Cotonnière du Kasai-Maniema to 51% and acquired SOLBENA and ESTAGRICO, though parts of SOLBENA were later liquidated. In 1987, COBEPA became TEXAF's majority shareholder with an 82% stake. In 1988, TEXAF consolidated its textile operations under the UTEXAFRICA umbrella, merging UTEXCO, Zaïreprint (a printing unit), and Otricot-Super Star (hosiery and clothing). The following year, TEXAF acquired ESTAGRICO, an agricultural enterprise with plantations in Uvira, from Unibra. By 1993, 50% of ESTAGRICO was divested to the French cotton conglomerate Compagnie Française pour le Développement des Fibres Textiles (CFDT), now known as Développement des agro-industries du Sud (Dagris). During this period, TEXAF's subsidiary MECELCO, which maintained rolling stock for Gécamines, ceased to receive contractual payments. In 2000, TEXAF's majority shareholder COBEPA faced a takeover by BNP Paribas. By 2001, UTEXAFRICA declared bankruptcy amid mounting debt, including EUR 31 million owed to the IFC. A December settlement, backed by COBEPA, enabled operations to continue. In June 2002, a management-led buyout spearheaded by Philippe Croonenberghs transferred controlling interest in TEXAF to Société Financière Africaine (SOFINA), which acquired an 82.1% stake. An additional 7% equity tranche was allocated to UTEXAFRICA's executive cadres Albert Yuma Mulimbi and Jean-Philippe Waterschoot.

In April 2004, TEXAF signed a framework agreement with China's CHA Textiles Group to establish a joint venture named Congotex, aimed at consolidating UTEXAFRICA's textile business and wax-fabric operations, with TEXAF retaining a 43% shareholding in the venture. The two entities founded a real estate firm, IMMOTEX, jointly owned by UTEXAFRICA and CHA. In 2007, TEXAF acquired ANAGEST, proprietor of three residential complexes, from the ATENOR Group. That year also marked the cessation of textile manufacturing in the DRC as Congotex entered liquidation. With the dissolution of the national textile industry, UTEXAFRICA emerged as the majority stakeholder in IMMOTEX and redirected its core focus toward real estate. In 2009, TEXAF acquired the remaining 50% of CARRIGRES—its construction materials subsidiary—for EUR 5.75 million. In 2014, the CHA Textiles Group acquired a 10% interest in TEXAF. That same year, the conglomerate divested its interest in IMBAKIN.

== Mission ==
The corporate purpose of TEXAF, as stated in Article 3 of its Articles of Association: "The company's purpose is to take an interest, through equity participation, in all industrial, commercial, or civil enterprises, including providing technical, administrative, and financial assistance, and to manage such a portfolio. It may, within the limits of its corporate purpose, carry out all transactions involving movable and immovable property, as well as financial, industrial, commercial, and civil operations, both in Belgium and abroad. It may also participate, by way of contribution, transfer, merger, subscription, shareholding, financial involvement or otherwise, in any companies or operations having a similar or related purpose or that may help achieve its purpose".

== History ==
=== Founding, early development, and expansion into water and electricity infrastructure ===
The history of TEXAF dates back to 1924, when Valère Lecluse, director of the Lecluse Frères textile factories in Ronse, traveled to the Belgian Congo to establish a cotton enterprise. Recognizing the potential of processing cotton locally, Lecluse requested land from the colonial authorities for the construction of a textile plant. He was granted a provisional two-year lease on approximately 45 hectares of land, strategically located between the Gombé River, the Léo 1 and Léo 2 railway lines, the Basoko River, and the Congo River. Lecluse secured the support of the Lagache Frères group, textile industrialists based in Ronse, leading to the formal establishment of the Société Textile Africaine (TEXAF) on 14 August 1925. The Lagache group held 95% of the initial 20 million franc capital, with Lecluse retaining 5%. The founding board of TEXAF included members of the Lagache family—Henri Lagache (president), Victor Lagache (vice president), Léon Lagache (managing director), and Edmond Lagache (director)—alongside Lecluse, Joseph Dieudonné Rhodius (who would later serve as managing director in Belgian Congo from 1934 to 1947 and vice president from 1947 to 1957), and cotton trader Robert Pflieger. Crédit Anversois also participated, represented by Louis Eloy and Fernand Vigneron.

In April 1927, TEXAF secured permanent concession rights to the leased land, and on 16 May of the same year, construction began with the laying of the factory's first stone. Joseph Rhodius assumed the role of managing director that year, contributing assets from his other ventures, including Rhodeby and Rhokasai. The official inauguration of the factory took place on 28 June 1928, presided over by King Albert I of Belgium. By that year, TEXAF had achieved a stock market capitalization of 417.2 million francs, ranking ninth among Belgian-Congolese enterprises. Driven by ambitious expansion goals, the company ventured into cotton cultivation and processing beyond the Belgian Congo, establishing the COTONAF cotton company in French Equatorial Africa. TEXAF diversified its holdings by acquiring power plants, oil mills, and riverboats to support its growing industrial base. In 1930, TEXAF and Crédit Anversois co-founded the Société Hydro-electric de Sanga, situated on the Inkisi River, 80 kilometers from Léopoldville (now Kinshasa). With a capital of 60 million francs and TEXAF holding a majority stake (60,001 of 120,000 shares), the power station was built to supply electricity to the textile plant. It also provided power to the Bas-Congo (now Kongo Central) region and Brazzaville through a partnership with Colectric. The power company later evolved into Forces Electriques et Mécaniques (Sanga) before merging with TEXAF in 1962. TEXAF also controlled industrial subsidiaries such as MECELCO and SEMACO (Jaspar elevators).

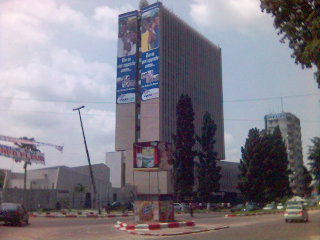
The headquarters of the Société de Distribution d'Eau de Léopoldville—now known as the Régie de Distribution d'Eau (REGIDESO)—in January 2006.

TEXAF played a role in the development of urban infrastructure, subscribing to nearly 25,000 shares in the Société de Distribution d'Eau de Léopoldville (now REGIDESO), founded on 18 November 1929 with a capital of 30 million francs. This was part of the Lukunga Water Supply Project, which would support industrial and urban needs. That same year, TEXAF launched its medical service for workers and employees. The company's textile operations ramped up quickly. By the end of 1928, the spinning mill began operations with 10,000 spindles, followed in April 1929 by a weaving section equipped with 288 looms, each operating at 175 strokes per minute. The dyeing section, specializing in indigo fabrics, was capable of processing 20,000 meters during an 8-hour shift. Cotton production also increased steadily—from 1,252 tons in 1926 to 4,772 tons in 1929. In that same year, textile output reached 927,000 meters. Financially, TEXAF recorded net results of 3.87 million francs in 1927, rising to 17.17 million in 1928, before declining to 5.35 million in 1929.

=== Corporate reorganization, wartime production and expansion ===
By 1930, TEXAF had become a dominant player in the region's cotton industry, operating 32 ginning factories across the Belgian Congo and French Equatorial Africa and reaching a production level of 7,500 tons of cotton and 4,366,000 meters of textile output. The factory covered 31,250 square meters, and the company had established a broad agricultural division, which encompassed six major concessions and experimental projects such as the 4,000-hectare Rhodeby Concession near Léopoldville, the Rhokasai and Ruzizi concessions, cottonseed propagation farms, sericulture initiatives, and even an elephant domestication program.

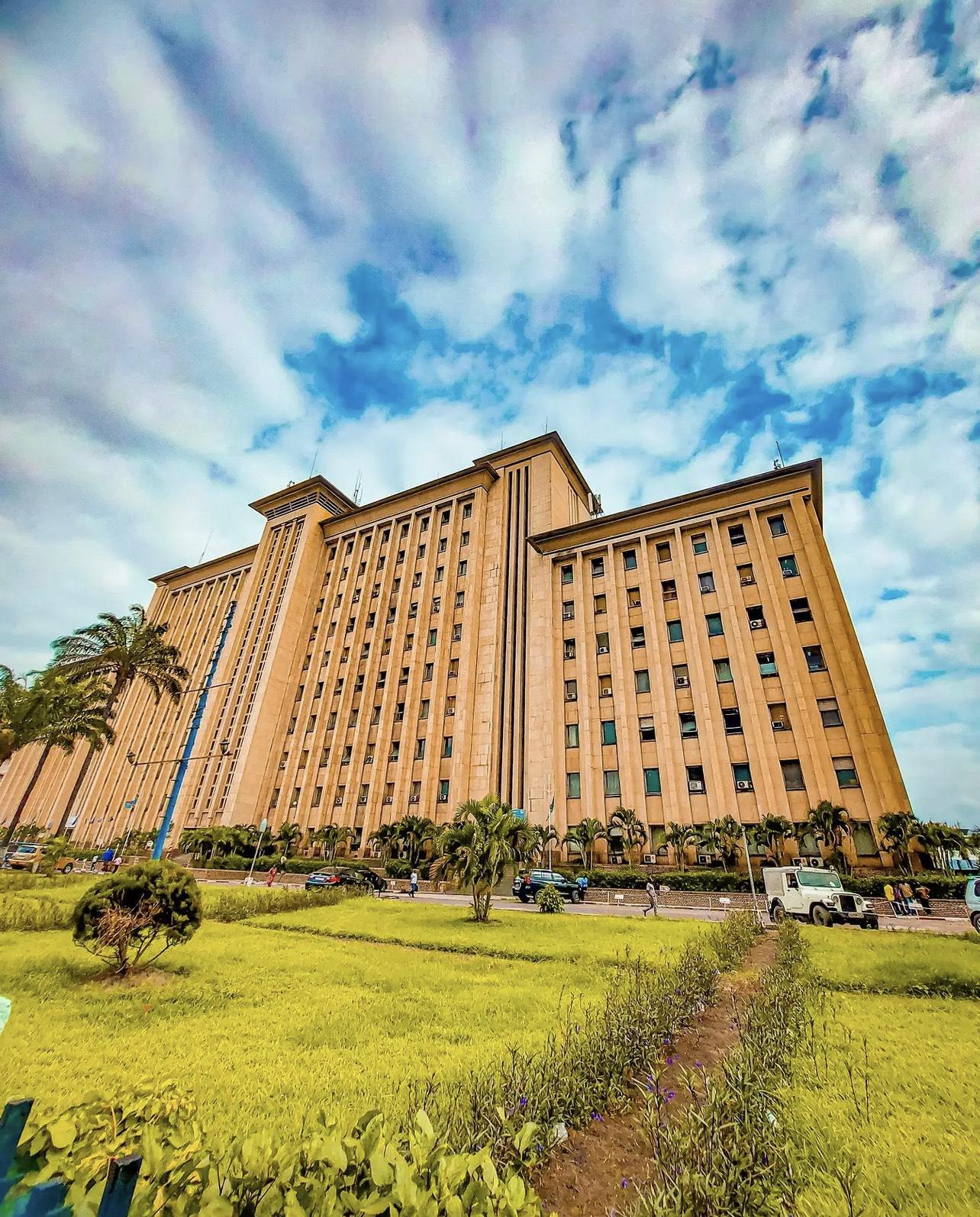
The headquarters of Société commerciale des transports et des ports (SCTP), in September 2020.

Despite this growth, TEXAF was severely affected by the global economic crisis following the 1929 stock market crash. The Lagache group's debt-driven expansion strategy exacerbated the company's financial fragility, leading to increasing annual losses—28.18 million francs initially, then rising to 53 million in 1931, 62 million in 1932, 71 million in 1933, 74 million in 1934, and reaching 81 million by 1935. In response, TEXAF initiated a series of divestments to restore financial stability. Among these measures was the 1931 transfer of 31 cotton zones to COTONCO, in exchange for 24,000 of its shares. COTONCO, in turn, expanded and diversified, acquiring interests in companies such as TISSACO and ELITEX. In the following years, its maritime services were handed over to the Office d'Exploitation des Transports Coloniaux (OTRACO)—now known as the Société Commerciale des Transports et des Ports (SCTP)—while its water supply operations were transferred to the colonial authorities in 1934. Meanwhile, its real estate and agricultural activities were moved to a newly created entity, the Société Immobilière, Agricole et Forestière du Congo (IMAFOR). The textile facilities themselves were transferred to a newly established company, Usines Textiles de Léopoldville (UTEXLÉO), on 4 April 1934. This restructuring marked TEXAF's transformation into a holding company, led by Crédit Anversois, which had taken majority ownership. Its portfolio came to include UTEXLÉO, the Société des Forces Hydroélectriques de Sanga, IMAFOR, and the public water utility REGIDESO. However, the collapse of Crédit Anversois in 1939 further destabilized the group, and its stake in TEXAF was taken over by SOPABEL. Due to the outbreak of World War II, the liquidation of Crédit Anversois could not proceed, and UTEXLÉO inherited a considerable debt of 106 million francs.

Despite these setbacks, UTEXLÉO continued its industrial operations. In 1936, a printing workshop was added, allowing the factory to focus on printed textiles. Nevertheless, the company faced fierce competition from inexpensive Japanese indigo fabrics, whose production and import costs drastically undercut UTEXLÉO's pricing. Consequently, TEXAF's stock value plummeted from its 1928 peak of 3,845 francs to just 47 francs by the end of the decade. The onset of World War II marked a shift in priorities. Against his Board's advice, Joseph Rhodius traveled to the United States to secure machinery and technology for a major expansion project aimed at doubling the factory's capacity to meet military and civilian demand. This led to the construction of an additional 3 hectares of facilities for 78 million francs. A 1942 visit by Albert De Vleeschauwer underscored the urgent need to increase production, as the local population's textile needs (estimated at 60–70 million meters annually) far outstripped the existing capacity of 10 million meters. During this period, the population of Léopoldville more than doubled, from 49,972 in 1940 to 101,501 in 1945. By the war's end, UTEXLÉO faced a new challenge in the form of a massive war tax amounting to over 96 million francs. Nevertheless, the company also turned its attention to social responsibility. Around 1945, it created a "Welfare Fund" with 35 million francs, which led to the establishment of the Foundation for Indigenous Welfare. This initiative culminated in the construction of a 150-bed medical-social center for workers and their families, now known as the Maternité de Kintambo (Kintambo Maternity Hospital), which opened in 1953.

In the post–World War II period, TEXAF entered a phase of exceptional prosperity. Between 1951 and 1960, the company distributed dividends totaling 360.2 million Belgian francs. Investment in new machinery, including 5,400 Saco-Lowell spindles and 422 second-hand Draper looms, enabled substantial production increases. Spinning output rose from 4,189,000 kg in 1947 to 5,978,000 kg in 1957, with corresponding increases in the fineness of thread. Weaving output similarly grew, climbing from 22.7 million meters in 1947 to 32.6 million meters by 1957. Printed fabric production expanded as well, from 4.73 million meters to 11.47 million meters during the same period. Alongside textile production, TEXAF diversified its industrial base. At the UTEXLÉO site, new factories were established for producing blankets (Socotex, 1946), sacks (TISSACO, 1948), socks (Bonneterie Africaine, 1952), and laundry services (Blanchisserie de la Gombe, 1953). Meanwhile, its affiliate IMAFOR began investing in construction materials, founding Bricongo (1950) for bricks and Carricongo (1951) for stone quarrying, which played an increasingly important role in Kinshasa's construction boom. This period marked the company's evolution from a textile producer to a diversified industrial entity. By 1960, UTEXLÉO ranked as the 31st most capitalized company in the Belgian Congo, with assets valued at 220 million Belgian francs.

=== Post-colonial Congo, nationalization and consolidation ===
TEXAF entered a new chapter in 1972, when Michel Relecom joined the Board of Directors, following a proposal from Compagnie Belge de Participations Paribas (COBEPA), which had consolidated TEXAF shares previously held by BNP Paribas subsidiaries. Around the same time, Loïc de l'Arbre de Malander joined the Executive Committee. In 1974, amid the Zairean government's Authenticité campaign, UTEXLÉO was nationalized and renamed UTEXCO. However, this shift was short-lived. In December 1975, COBEPA strengthened its influence on TEXAF's Board of Directors. By September 1976, following failed negotiations to transfer 40% ownership to Congolese partners, TEXAF reclaimed full ownership of UTEXCO. A renewed proposal in November 1976 to transfer half of UTEXCO's shares to Congolese figures such as Messrs Bisengimana, Sambwa, Moleka, and Rwakabuba did not materialize, though by 1980 the government again pressed for a 40% national shareholding requirement. The late 1970s and early 1980s brought significant upheaval to the cotton industry. The dissolution of ONAFITEX in 1978 marked the end of state control over cotton plantations. Mixed ownership companies were created, and TEXAF, through UTEXCO, re-entered the cotton production business it had exited in 1934, acquiring a 25% stake in the Cotonnière du Kasai-Maniema. However, the collapse of state-managed cotton supply chains caused difficulties in raw material procurement. In response, TEXAF pursued further consolidation and modernization.

The 1980s were marked by leadership transitions and renewed investment. In 1981, Herman De Croo joined the TEXAF board. Two years later, Loïc de l'Arbre de Malander was appointed Managing Director, a post he held until 1997. A broad modernization initiative was launched, culminating in a 1988 loan agreement with the International Finance Corporation (IFC) for ECU 11.5 million. During this period, TEXAF increased its stake in the Cotonnière du Kasaï-Maniema to 51% in 1984 and acquired the SOLBENA company in 1986. Although SOLBENA included a factory in Lubumbashi and an extensive distribution network, much of its assets were eventually liquidated at a loss. In 1987, COBEPA became TEXAF's majority shareholder with an 82% stake. In 1988, TEXAF consolidated its textile operations under the UTEXAFRICA umbrella, merging UTEXCO, Zaïreprint (a printing unit), and Otricot-Super Star (hosiery and clothing). The following year, it acquired the cotton-producing firm ESTAGRICO from Unibra, with plantations in Uvira. In 1993, half of ESTAGRICO was sold to the French cotton group Compagnie Française pour le Développement des Fibres Textiles (CFDT), now known as Développement des agro-industries du Sud (Dagris).

The 1990s brought a period of severe instability. In September 1991, international cooperation collapsed, and widespread looting occurred. MECELCO, a TEXAF subsidiary that maintained rail equipment for Gécamines, stopped receiving payments. A second wave of looting struck in 1993, during which several employees, including Technical Manager Christian Cattiaux, were killed. By the late 1990s, Congo had undergone immense political upheaval. The First Congo War (1996–1997) ended the Mobutu regime, replacing Zaire with the Democratic Republic of the Congo under Laurent-Désiré Kabila. The subsequent Second Congo War further destabilized the region, with cotton-producing facilities looted and rendered inaccessible. Amid this volatility, COBEPA—then TEXAF's majority shareholder—was the target of a takeover bid by BNP-Paribas in June 2000. By 2001, the company, then known as UTEXAFRICA, declared bankruptcy and was ultimately merged with COBEPA, a BNP Paribas-controlled holding company.

=== Joint ventures and restructuring ===
At the start of 2001, UTEXAFRICA—TEXAF's principal operating company—faced a critical financial challenge when IFC demanded immediate repayment of EUR 31 million in outstanding debt originating from a 1988 loan. A settlement was reached in December of the same year with the support of COBEPA, paving the way for operational continuity. Despite financial pressures, the company maintained a degree of productivity, manufacturing 2.404 million meters of native wraps, contributing to an overall output of 6.4 million meters of fabric. A significant turning point came in June 2002 with a management buyout led by Philippe Croonenberghs, who had been serving as Managing Director since 1997. Through this transaction, control of TEXAF transferred to Société Financière Africaine (SOFINA), which acquired an 82.1% stake. Croonenberghs and Bernard de Gerlache controlled SOFINA, with a further 7% of shares transferred to UTEXAFRICA management, including Albert Yuma Mulimbi and Jean-Philippe Waterschoot.

In April 2004, TEXAF signed a framework agreement with China's CHA Textiles Group, establishing a joint venture named Congotex to consolidate UTEXAFRICA's textile business and wax production. TEXAF was to retain a 43% stake in this new entity. In parallel, a real estate company named IMMOTEX was created, jointly owned by UTEXAFRICA and CHA Textiles Group, and tasked with managing the manufacturing site and a large 100-hectare plot of land contributed by the Chinese partner. Implementation of these agreements began in 2005, at a time when the DRC was emerging from conflict and preparing for national elections. By 2006, TEXAF had recovered sufficiently to resume dividend payments. In 2007, the group diversified into real estate with the acquisition of ANAGEST—owner of three apartment buildings—from the ATENOR Group. That same year, however, marked the end of textile production in the country, as Congotex was put into liquidation. With the collapse of the Congolese textile industry, UTEXAFRICA became the majority shareholder in IMMOTEX and redirected its core activities toward property development. From 2008 onward, TEXAF invested heavily in enhancing and expanding the UTEXAFRICA site, adding a restaurant, a large swimming pool, and backup generators to support high-end residential infrastructure. In 2009, TEXAF acquired the remaining 50% of CARRIGRES—its construction material business—for EUR 5.75 million. Later that year, the group let out its first high-end apartment building in the "Phase IV" complex, a EUR 12 million real estate investment that signaled the beginning of a new growth trajectory in urban development.

The early 2010s saw the group further consolidate its position in real estate. In January 2011, it sold a 70% stake in the three apartment buildings acquired in 2007 for EUR 2.4 million. In July 2012, it also divested its 50% stake in MECELCO for approximately EUR 1 million. By December 2012, the "Phase IV" project had been completed, delivering 54 modern apartments. In June 2013, the first three buildings of a new residential development, "Champ de Coton" ("Cotton Field"), were let out, and a 7,236-square-meter plot was sold the following month for USD 4.1 million.

In 2014, the CHA Textiles group acquired a 10% stake in TEXAF. That same year, the group spun off IMBAKIN, which held a debt claim on the Congolese government. The "Champ de Coton" project was completed in May 2015 with a total of 10 buildings and 52 apartments. In October 2016, the "Clos des Musiciens" residential project was delivered, adding 33 new apartments to the portfolio. In April 2017, the group launched its ambitious "Bois Nobles" project, which was projected to include 82 housing units.

== Organizational structure ==
TEXAF is organized into three main sectors: real estate, industry, and digital. Each sector encompasses multiple subsidiaries with varying levels of ownership and specialization.

=== Real estate ===
The sector focuses on property development and management and includes several key entities. IMMOTEX, a Congolese limited liability company founded in 2004, is 64.7% owned by TEXAF and holds major land assets in Kinshasa, including the UTEXAFRICA complex. Anagest, almost entirely (98.9%) owned by TEXAF, functions as a Belgium-based holding entity in this sector. Through Anagest, TEXAF possesses full ownership of Cotex, a firm positioned at the intersection of the industrial and property sectors. UTEXAFRICA, with 99.6% ownership, is charged with managing the UTEXAFRICA property—an integral component of TEXAF's real estate portfolio. TEXAF also holds a 95.1% interest in La Cotonnière, which manages assets historically linked to textile production. ESTAGRICO is also a fully owned subsidiary.

==== Development strategy ====
IMMOTEX manages two major real estate assets strategically located within the capital.

- The first asset is a 141,184.19-square-meter plot located at 372 Avenue Colonel Mondjiba in the Ngaliema commune of Kinshasa. This site constitutes the core of the historic UTEXAFRICA concession and includes the buildings of the former TEXAF textile factory. A portion of these buildings has been renovated into modern office spaces, while others are used as rental warehouses and industrial units. In 2013, these properties generated gross rental income totaling €2.4 million.
- The second asset under IMMOTEX is a significantly larger 1,040,788-square-meter plot located in Mont Ngafula, in the Kinsuka area along the Congo River. This land, formerly housing the CPA textile factory, remains largely undeveloped. Due to the site's challenging topography, it is estimated that only about 70% of the area is viable for future residential development. Despite currently generating no rental income, TEXAF has outlined plans for a large-scale residential project targeting Kinshasa's growing middle class. However, the land has been subject to repeated illegal occupation attempts, leading to multiple ongoing legal proceedings in both civil and criminal courts. Like all land in the Democratic Republic of the Congo, the site is held under a renewable 25-year concession granted by the state.

=== Industry ===
This sector includes former or current industrial operations: Carrigrès, which is wholly owned by TEXAF, is dedicated to the production of industrial or construction materials, such as those sourced from stone quarries. Another entity, Congotex, reflects TEXAF's historical involvement in the textile industry. TEXAF holds a 35% stake in Congotex through COTEX, along with an additional 8.8% held directly.

=== Digital ===
This sector represents TEXAF's investment in digital infrastructure and IT-related ventures in the Democratic Republic of the Congo. Central to this strategy is TEXAF Digital, a fully owned subsidiary. Through a 50/50 joint venture with Close the Gap, the company formed Close the Gap – TEXAF (RDC), which focuses on promoting digital accessibility and potentially the refurbishment of IT devices. TEXAF also holds a 49% stake in OADC – TEXAF Digital (Belgium). On the local front, OADC – TEXAF Digital (DRC), is entirely owned by TEXAF.

== Operations ==
Congotex' website states that the company is the largest textile and apparel manufacturer in the DRC. Congotex produces:

- Fabrics
- Paramedical supplies including gauze, sterile cotton and dressings
- Manufactured clothing and goods including uniforms, dresses, suits, towels, et cetera
