= American School of Kinshasa =

The American School of Kinshasa
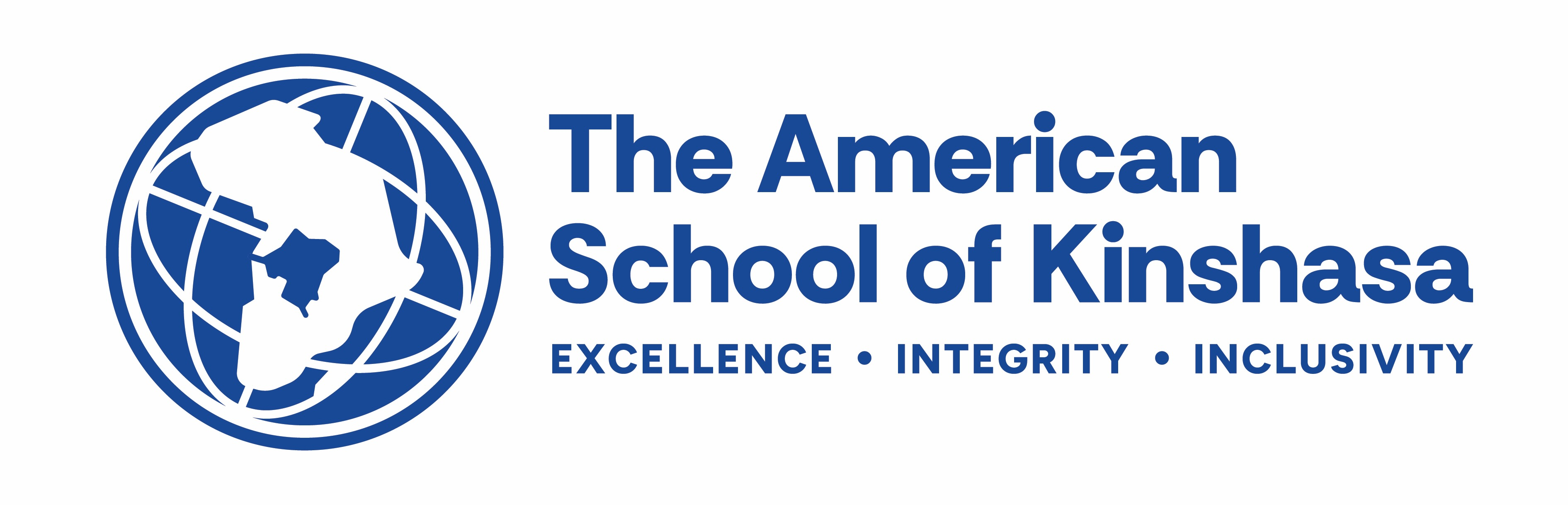

Location
- Kinshasa; Democratic Republic of the Congo
- 4.335685°S 15.243938°E

Information
- Type: International school Non-profit
- Motto: "Excellence. Integrity. Inclusivity."
- Established: 1961
- CEEB code: 611000
- Head of school: Ben Marsh
- Grades: Preschool-12
- Enrollment: 350
- Colors: Yellow and blue
- Affiliation: Independent
- Website: www.tasok.net

The American School of Kinshasa (TASOK) is an international, private, independent K-12 school in Kinshasa, Democratic Republic of the Congo, for students aged between 3 and 18 years.

== History ==
TASOK was founded in 1961 as "TASOL" for "The American School of Leopoldville", Leopoldville being the name of the capital of the newly independent Democratic Republic of the Congo. The "L" was amended to "K" when the name of the city was changed to Kinshasa in 1966.

After independence in 1960, the Congolese schooling system entered into chaos, and many of the European schools that had catered to business people, missionaries, diplomats, and aid workers closed. A group of these led by American missionaries wanted to start a K-12 institution for their children and for others desiring an American-style of education in Central Africa. The founders were an American missionary couple named Ruby and Orville Wiebe. Land for the school was donated by the American Baptist Foreign Mission Board who resided on the mission station near Stanley Pool (now Pool Malebo) on the Congo River. Until the school buildings were completed, the first classes were held in buildings on the mission station.

With the assistance of the U.S. Embassy, 48 acres (190,000 m^{2}) of land on Mt. Ngaliema near Camp Tshatshi and the principal residence of President Mobutu were secured under a long-term lease. In the mid-1960s construction of a campus began, incorporating elementary, intermediate, and high schools in addition to faculty housing, sports facilities, and a community center. This elevated the TASOK campus to the hub of the American—and larger English-speaking—expatriate community in Kinshasa from the period spanning the 1970s through the 1990s.

The planners of the campus maintained two sections of the campus in jungle condition and for a time in the early 1990s a reserve for bonobos rescued from poor conditions occupied part of the unspoiled campus. Subsequently, however, a permanent home was built for those bonobos on the outskirts of Kinshasa (Lola ya Bonobo).

== Organization ==
The school is governed by the School Association which elects the School Board. Membership of the Association is automatically conferred on the parents or guardians of children attending the School. The United States Department of State published a fact sheet on TASOK for the 2019–2020 academic year on its website, noting updated details on curriculum, faculty, facilities, etc.

The curriculum is that of U.S. college-preparatory public schools. Instruction is in English. Community service is emphasized. French is taught as a foreign language. The school accepts students with mild learning disabilities. It is accredited by the Middle States Association of Colleges and Schools.

== Facilities ==
The school is in Ngaliema, on a 42-acre (17 ha) property.

The American School of Kinshasa provides fairly well-equipped facilities. The campus is split into two halves, one for the elementary school (students K-5th grade) and the other for the middle/high school (6th-12th grades). The elementary area consists of four main buildings. There is a separate classroom for each grade and among the buildings are the elementary library, cafeteria, technology, music and PE rooms. The elementary campus also shares its ESL and French classrooms with the upper school. For outdoor activities, the lower campus boasts tennis courts, a soccer field, a basketball court, and a playground.

The middle/high school consists of 22 classrooms, a library, an administration building, and a sports area. The sports area includes a swimming pool, a basketball court, ping-pong tables, beach volleyball courts, and a soccer/softball field. Musicals, assemblies, plays, school dances, and other school wide gatherings are hosted in the Cultural Activities Center (CAC). All the school facilities, as well as residences for foreign-hired staff, are located on a 42-acre (170,000 m^{2}) tract of rain forest in Kinshasa's metropolitan area.

== Finances ==
In the 2004–2005 school year, approximately 80% of the school's income derives from tuition and fees.

== See also ==
- List of international schools

== Sources ==
This article was adapted from a public domain report by the US Office of Overseas Schools, released on November 26, 2004.
