= Federation of Businesses of the Congo =

Labour interests group in DRC

- Formation: 1997
- Type: Employer federation
- Headquarters: 10 Avenue des aviateurs
- Location: Gombe, Kinshasa, Democratic Republic of the Congo
- President: Albert Yuma
- Website: fec-rdc.com

The Federation of Businesses of the Congo (French: Fédération des entreprises du Congo) is the main employers' organization in the Democratic Republic of the Congo. Established in 1997, it had 2, 700 members in 2010. It received financial support from the French Development Agency in 2010. Its president is Albert Yuma.
