= Bandalungwa =

Commune in Kinshasa, Democratic Republic of the Congo

- Commune
- Commune de Bandalungwa
- Bandalungwa on map of Kinshasa city-province
- Location in DR Congo
- Coordinates: 04°20′55″S 15°16′47″E
- Country: DR Congo
- City-Province: Kinshasa

Area
  - Total: 6.28 km^{2} (2.42 sq mi)

Population (2016 est.)
  - Total: 259,760
  - Density: 41,400/km^{2} (107,000/sq mi)

Bandalungwa (often abbreviated "Bandal") is a commune in the Funa District of Kinshasa in the western region of the Democratic Republic of the Congo. Covering an area of 6.82 square kilometers, Bandalungwa is centrally situated within the city. It is bordered by the Gombe commune and Kokolo Military Camp to the north, Selembao to the south, the communes of Ngiri-Ngiri, Kasa-Vubu, and Lingwala to the east, and the Makelele River, Ngaliema, and Kintambo to the west. The commune had an estimated population of 934,821 in 2015, although official census data from 2016 reported a significantly lower figure of 259,760 residents.

Established in 1955, Bandalungwa was initially developed as a planned residential area for civil servants and teachers during the final years of Belgian colonial rule, which set it apart from the comparatively newer and less structured communes of Kinshasa. Following Congolese independence in 1960, the commune experienced rapid urbanization driven by significant rural-to-urban migration, leading to the expansion and replacement of colonial-era residential buildings and placing increased demand on electricity supplies while exerting substantial pressure on existing urban infrastructure. Despite challenges associated with unregulated urban growth, Bandalungwa evolved into a working-class commune and home to several landmarks, including the family residence of Mobutu Sese Seko and a mix of residential blocks and approximately forty flat hotels.

== Etymology ==
The name Bandalungwa originates from a linguistic misinterpretation during an interaction between a Belgian colonial administrator and the local inhabitants. The incident occurred during a visit to Chief Lingwala Ngambo, grandson of the Humbu ethnic group's Chief Selembao. Lingwala had been allocated land near the present-day sites of CHANIMetal and UTEXAFRICA but later relocated north to what is now Bandalungwa, while Selembao resettled farther south.

Inquiring about the ownership of a nearby lake, Chief Lingwala asked his people in the Teke dialect. The response was "bana ba Lingwala", with bana meaning "water" (or river), and ba serving as a determinative conjunction meaning "of". However, the Belgian administrator misheard this as "Bandalungwa", and the name was subsequently adopted. Chief Lingwala's legacy is physically commemorated within the commune; his body was buried in 1923 at No. 3 Mpumbu Il Avenue in the Lubudi quartier.

== Geography ==
=== Hydrology ===
Bandalungwa is traversed by two rivers, essential for sanitation and agriculture. The Makelele River forms the western boundary with the commune of Kintambo, while the Basoko River separates Bandalungwa from the Kokolo Military Camp and Ngiri-Ngiri commune to the north. These watercourses facilitate efficient drainage and flood management while supporting large-scale market gardening within the commune. Known locally as inga and bilanga, these gardens provide much of Kinshasa's fresh vegetable supply. The hydrological system also includes the Mfuti Watershed, a subject of environmental studies focused on combating erosion and managing water quality. Challenges like sediment build-up in this watershed illustrate the interaction between urban growth and environmental care, with erosion endangering water ecosystems and usability.

=== Administrative division ===
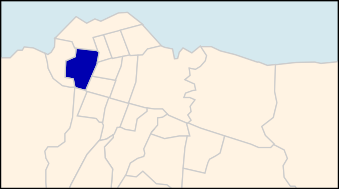
Map of Bandalungwa

Administratively, Bandalungwa is governed by a mayor and a deputy mayor, supported by a structured network of municipal services. These include departments responsible for civil status, population management, housing, environmental regulation, social affairs, and small- and medium-sized enterprises, as well as branches of the Agence Nationale de Renseignements (ANR) and the general migration directorate. Policing and security fall under the territorial police.

The commune is divided into eight quartiers (quarters), which are subdivided into avenues. While these quartiers serve as functional units for governance and service delivery, they lack independent legal status.

==== Quartiers ====
- Adoula
- Bisengo
- Kasa-Vubu
- Makelele
- Lubudi
- Lingwala
- Lumumba
- Kokolo

== History ==
Historically, the area was a lake that evolved into a sandy plateau inhabited by the Bateke and Bahumbu peoples, who established a kingdom encompassing Bandalungwa and also the present-day communes of Selembao, Kasa-Vubu, Ngiri-Ngiri, Kintambo, and Lingwala. This kingdom, led by a series of rulers, saw its last king, Lungua, died on 20 August 1920, in the village of Bampao.

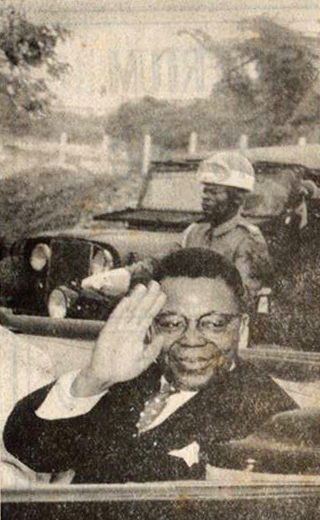
Joseph Kasa-Vubu arrives in Bandalungwa, Léopoldville, in 1960 for the independence celebrations.

Bandalungwa, in its modern incarnation, was formally established on 8 December 1955, during the late colonial period. Its creation was part of a development initiative funded by the Belgian monarchy, designed to provide housing for Congolese civil servants and educators. Initial construction began with three quartiers: Mawa (now Adoula), Max-Hoan (now Bisengo), and Cynkin (now Makelele), characterized by rows of two-story colonial-style homes. These homes, which remain a distinctive feature of the commune, were built to accommodate the needs of public service workers and their families.

The first administrator of Bandalungwa was Nor, a Belgian official, who oversaw the commune's development. In 1959, Ngoma Oscar became the first Congolese administrator. After independence in 1960, Bandalungwa experienced rapid urbanization fueled by significant rural-to-urban migration, which transformed the commune into a densely populated, working-class area with modest incomes. Despite the lack of a comprehensive urbanization policy, the colonial-era housing infrastructure has largely remained intact, with minimal modifications over time.

=== Socioeconomic and urban developments ===
During the 1990s and early 2000s, Bandalungwa grappled with urban issues, including overcrowding, pervasive criminal activities, and pervasive nighttime noise.

In 2011, a significant urban development project was announced to construct 1,000 social housing units on the former Bandalungwa nursery site at the intersection of Kasa-Vubu and Libération (formerly 24 Novembre) avenues. Led by the Chinese company Société Zhen Gwei Technique Congo (STZC), the project was intended to span three years and cost nearly $160 million. However, delays and a relaunch in 2013 under the succeeding Minister of Urban Planning and Housing, Fridolin Kasweshi, shifted the timeline. The project aimed to establish a residential area called "Joseph Kabila Kin-oasis City", featuring diverse housing options, including apartments, villas, and public amenities like markets, hotels, and cultural spaces. By 2014, several structures were nearing completion, with media outlets like 7sur7 accentuating the emergence of modern multi-story buildings. In the ensuing years, numerous extended-stay hotels have been developed, financed by members of the Congolese diaspora.

== Demographics ==
Historical population
Year	1967	1970	1984	2003	2004
Pop.	45,220	60,243	97,214	195,680	202,341
±%	—	+33.2%	+61.4%	+101.3%	+3.4%

== Economy ==
Bandalungwa is characterized by its bustling commercial and leisure sectors, which are supported by a blend of modern infrastructure and traditional markets. Residential structures in the commune feature a range of urban forms, including adjoining houses, semi-detached dwellings, and blocks of six to ten residences. In response to demographic pressures, new modern self-construction have emerged, including high-end developments such as the "Kin Oasis" residential area in the southern part of the Kokolo Military Camp.

The commune thrives around three key agglomerations:

- Bandal-Adoula (formerly Moulaert): Known for its residential zones with individual, semi-detached, and isolated houses.
- Bandal-Bisengo: A commercial hub featuring numerous blocks dedicated to retail and leisure activities. This area hosts popular establishments such as the Michael supermarket, which operates day and night, and caters to a diverse clientele.
- Bandal-Makelele (formerly Syn-kin): A significant zone that integrates residential and commercial activities.

The commune thrives in its bustling retail and hospitality industries, centered on dynamic streets including Inga, Kimbondo, and Kasa-Vubu avenues, as well as the shopping blocks in Bandal-Bisengo and Bandal-Makelele. These hotspots are dotted with cafés, open-air terraces, refreshment stands, and casual dining establishments. Lumumba market in Bandal-Adoula is the central daytime trading hub that offers essential goods and services. Two key fairs, Jardin d'Eden and Solution, held during the dry season, boost the economy, attract crowds, and stimulate business interactions. Tourist attractions like Teke Chief Lungwal's tomb on Kimbondo Avenue and an early residence of President Mobutu on Inga Avenue also enhance cultural tourism.

Religious institutions, including the Catholic parishes of Saint-Michel (established in 1955) and Saint-Charles Luanga (established in 1961) serve as community centers and support various local initiatives.

== Culture ==
=== Music ===
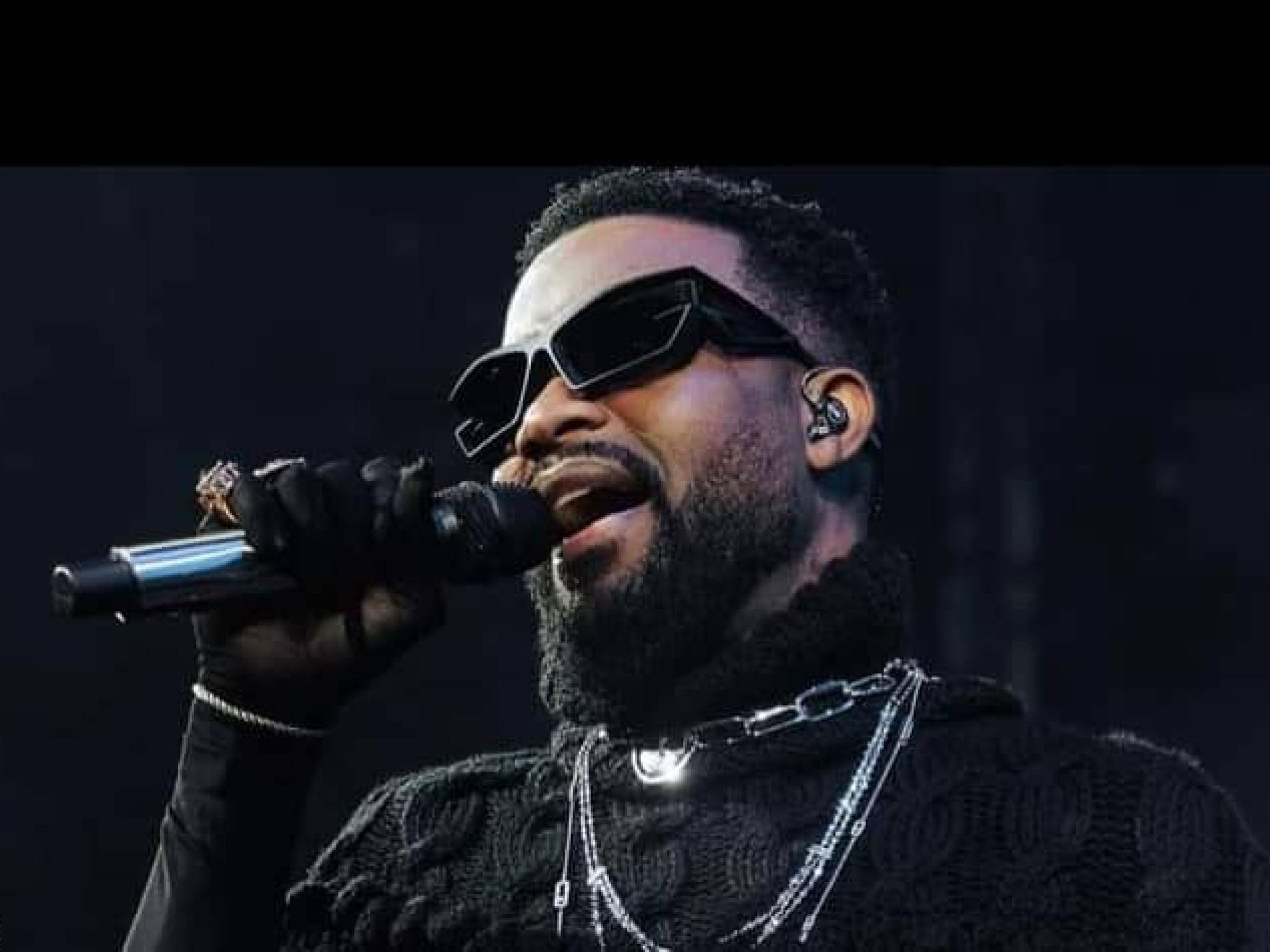
Fally Ipupa began his musical career in Bandalungwa with the bands Talent Latent and Quartier Latin International before embarking on a successful solo career in 2006.

The commune is often referred to as Kinshasa's musical epicenter. The dominant musical genres include Congolese rumba, ndombolo, soukous, jazz, hip hop, R&B, dancehall, mopacho, and Afrobeats. A notable cultural asset is Kinshasound, which is a prominent hip-hop recording studio located in the Makelele quartier. Established in 2001 by DDT and Kevin Kim-Piobi, the studio has been instrumental in nurturing Congolese music. It has hosted artists such as Marshall Dixon and Poison Mobutu and facilitated the early careers of JB Mpiana, Werrason, and Fally Ipupa.

Bandalungwa has also produced a lineage of prominent musicians, with many influential figures in contemporary Congolese music beginning their careers in this commune. Notable names include Wenge Musica, JB Mpiana, Werrason, Fally Ipupa, Ferré Gola, Céléo Scram, Jossart N'Yoka Longo, Blaise Bula, Didier Masela, JDT Mulopwe, Bill Clinton Kalonji, Saak Saakul, and King Kester Emeneya.

=== Food, sports, and recreation ===
Notable local dishes include ntaba (grilled goat) and poulet grillé kinoise (Kinshasa-style grilled chicken).

Association football is the most popular sport. The commune hosts three notable football fields: Terrain Allemagne, Terrain Ngoma, and Terrain Municipal. In its heyday, Bandalungwa also housed the Bandalungwa-Kintambo Sports Complex (COBASKI), which features facilities like an Olympic swimming pool, basketball court, and tennis court.
