= Théâtre de Verdure de Mont Ngaliema =

Amphitheater in Mount Ngaliema, Kinshasa

Coordinates: 4°19′47″S 15°14′59″E

Théâtre de la Verdure
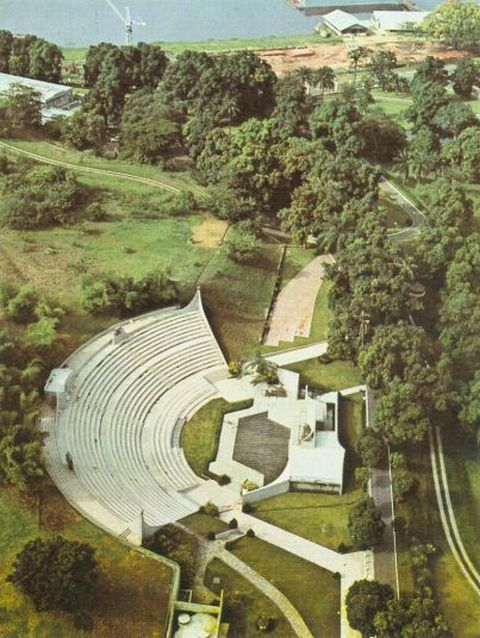
- The Théâtre de la Verdure in 1974
- Interactive map of Théâtre de la Verdure
- Address: Kinshasa; Democratic Republic of the Congo
- Location: Ngaliema, Mont Ngaliema
- Owner: Ngaliema Town Hall
- Seating type: reserved seating
- Capacity: 3,500
- Type: Outdoor amphitheater

Construction
- Opened: 1970; 56 years ago
- Renovated: 2011–2012
- Architect: Olivier-Clément Cacoub

The Théâtre de la Verdure (meaning "Green Theater"), is an open-air amphitheater situated within the Institute of National Museums of Congo on Mount Ngaliema in the Ngaliema commune of Kinshasa, located in the western region of the Democratic Republic of the Congo. It serves as a venue for theatrical performances, concerts, and various cultural events, and is named for its lush, green surroundings.

Constructed in 1970 on the private estate of Mount Ngaliema by President Mobutu Sese Seko, the amphitheater's architectural design was influenced by the archetypal open-air amphitheaters of Greco-Roman antiquity, which Mobutu had encountered during his visit to Italy.

== History ==
Historically, Mount Ngaliema, formerly known as Mount Stanley during the colonial era, served as the location for the gubernatorial residence of the province of Léopoldville, which included the capital Kinshasa, Kongo Central, and the former Bandundu Province. Following the country's independence from Belgium on 30 June 1960, it became the residence of the Republic's president, Joseph Kasa-Vubu, with his official quarters situated within the Palais de la Nation.

After assuming power, President Mobutu Sese Seko changed the name from "Mount Stanley" to "Mount Ngaliema" in 1966. Henceforth, the site was transformed into a presidential park (Parc Présidentiel), a project led by the Franco-Tunisian architect Olivier-Clément Cacoub. Cacoub was responsible for the initial project and designed the presidential park's gardens, which prominently featured imposing statues of Leopold II of Belgium astride his horse, as well as that of Henry Morton Stanley, alongside numerous other colonial effigies and monuments. Over time, Mobutu augmented the site and hosted a myriad of visitors. The Théâtre de la Verdure was subsequently constructed in 1970 within this presidential park based on the model of the amphitheaters of Ancient Rome and Greece and boasted a seating capacity of 3,500. It notably hosted performances by prominent American artists such as James Brown and B. B. King. However, during the tumultuous First and Second Congo Wars, the amphitheater suffered significant degradation. The resultant ravages necessitated extensive redevelopment efforts.

In December 2011, the amphitheater was closed to the public to facilitate rehabilitation works in anticipation of the 14th edition of the Organisation Internationale de la Francophonie summit, scheduled for Kinshasa in 2012. Concurrently, other sites, including the Cité de l'Union Africaine, Centre Commercial International Congolais (CCIC) building, Stade des Martyrs de la Pentecôte, and Palais du Peuple, were also earmarked for refurbishment to accommodate the summit. According to Ados Ndombasi, former manager of the Théâtre de la Verdure and President of the Watoo Balabala cultural platform, the comprehensive rehabilitation of the Théâtre de la Verdure was effectuated through the financial largesse of the Wallonia-Brussels International (WBI) delegation, amounting to several thousand euros. Post-rehabilitation, the venue was partially reopened in March 2012 to inaugurate the cultural week of the Francophonie. Since then, the amphitheater has been a host to a variety of events, including music festivals, concerts, comedy festivals, performances by indigenous ensembles, and classical music performances.

== Notable events ==
Some notable high-profile appearances include:

- In 1974, American funk artist James Brown and blues guitarist B. B. King delivered a legendary performance at the venue.
- On 13 September 2013, French rapper Booba performed at the venue.
- On 1 June 2014, Lokua Kanza and his ensemble performed in front of an audience of over 2,500 people, with guest artists such as Jean Goubald, Sara Tavares, Richard Bona, Fally Ipupa, and Olivier Tshimanga.
- From 20–22 June 2014, the venue hosted the Bralima-sponsored Primus Fete de la Musique, featuring Werrason, JB Mpiana, Jossart N'Yoka Longo, Ferré Gola, and Shakelewa.
- On 13–14 June 2015, Belgian singer Stromae graced the stage at this venue.
- From 10–12 September 2015, the venue hosted the first edition of Francofolies de Kinshasa, with the participation of French artists, including Philippe Lafontaine, Soprano, and La Fouine, alongside Congolese-Belgian actor Pitcho Womba Konga, as well as Congolese acts such as Bebson de la Rue, Lexxus Legal, Jean Goubald, Papa Wemba, Nkento Bakaji, Fabregas Le Métis Noir, Ferré Gola, and JB Mpiana.
