= Orgaman Group =

- Company type: Private
- Founded: 1931
- Headquarters: Avenue Lt-Colonel Lukusa, Kinshasa, Democratic Republic of the Congo
- Key people: Jean-Claude Damseaux (CEO)
- Revenue: 100 million Euro (2013)
- Number of employees: 2,932 (2010)

The Orgaman Group (French: Groupe Orgaman) is a food production and distribution company based in the Democratic Republic of the Congo.

== Ownership ==
The Orgaman Group is owned by the Damseaux family of Belgium. Its chief executive officer is Jean-Claude Damseaux.

== History ==
The Orgaman Group was founded in 1931 in the Democratic Republic of the Congo, then known as the Belgian Congo. It grew during World War II, as the DRC was cut off from Europe. By 1961, the company was passed on to the founder's son, William Damseaux. It was the main meat-processing and distribution company in the DRC in the 1970s and 1980s.

In recent years, Congolese businessman Albert Yuma Mulimbi tried to purchase it, but he was put off by the Damseaux's asking price. By 2013, the company had an annual revenue of 100 million Euro. In 2014, the company shut down two frozen food distribution subsidiaries, Transmac and Mampeza, due to increased tariffs.
