= Justin Kokolo =

Congolese military officer

Justin Kokolo-Longo
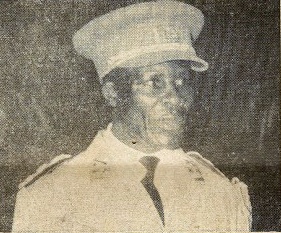
- Born: 1913; Mayombe, Belgian Congo
- Died: 21 November 1960 (aged 46–47); Léopoldville, Republic of the Congo
- Military career
- Allegiance: Congo; DR Congo
- Branch: Force Publique; Armée Nationale Congolaise
- Service years: 1936–1960
- Rank: Colonel
- Commands: Camp Leopold II
- Conflicts: Congo Crisis
- Memorials: Camp Kokolo

Justin Kokolo-Longo (1913 – 21 November 1960) was a Congolese military officer who briefly served as deputy chief of staff of the Armée Nationale Congolaise.

== Biography ==
Justin Kokolo was born into a Bakongo family in 1913 in Mayombe, Belgian Congo. He voluntarily enlisted in the Force Publique in 1936, quickly reaching the ranks of corporal and sergeant. He was one of four Congolese soldiers in the entire army to achieve the rank of adjutant before the independence of the Congo. (Note: Willame states that there were 10 nominated adjutants before independence.) Kokolo maintained close connections with President Joseph Kasa-Vubu, a fellow Mukongo, who sought his protection from undisciplined troops. On 8 July 1960 Kokolo, as the most senior of the adjutants, was appointed by the Congolese government to be commander of the Camp Léopold II garrison. He soon thereafter achieved the rank of colonel and became deputy chief of staff of the army—renamed the Armée Nationale Congolaise. On 11 July Kokolo was dispatched from Léopoldville to Élisabethville, Katanga to oversee the "Africanisation" of the garrison's officers. However, that evening the provincial government seceded from the Congo and Kokolo was immediately expelled from its territory upon his arrival. From there he flew to Luluabourg to report on the situation to the president and prime minister.

On 21 November Kokolo attempted to force his way into the Ghanaian embassy in Léopoldville to carry out an extradition order against the chargé d'affaires. United Nations peacekeepers on guard resisted, and in the ensuing conflict Kokolo and three of his men were killed. Once news of his death broke, soldiers rioted throughout the city. Kokolo was accorded a grand funeral along with his men, which garnered in upwards of 100,000 mourners throughout the capital. Camp Léopold II was renamed in his honor.
