= Albert Yuma Mulimbi =

Congolese businessman (born 1955)

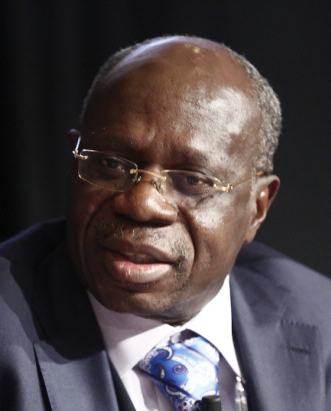
- Yuma in 2013
- Born: July 30, 1955 (age 71); Tanganyika Province, Democratic Republic of the Congo
- Education: UCLouvain
- Occupations: Chairman of Gecamines; Economist; Businessman

Albert Yuma Mulimbi (born July 30, 1955) is a Congolese businessman, economist and former chairman at the state-owned mining company Gecamines. An International Labour Organization dignitary, he is the chairman of the Congolese Employers Federation, Democratic Republic of the Congo's biggest business lobby group.

In late April 2019, Jeune Afrique reported that Yuma was recommended by former DRC President Joseph Kabila, whose coalition controls the majority in the Parliament, to the incumbent President Félix Tshisekedi as a potential Prime Minister. His candidacy was rejected in favour of Sylvestre Ilunga.

In December 2021, Albert Yuma was ousted from the presidency of Gécamines.

== Early life ==
Yuma was born on July 30, 1955, in Kongolo, Tanganyika province. Having spent much of his childhood in Belgium, he later earned a Master of Applied Economics from the University of Louvain (UCLouvain).

== Career ==
Yuma joined UTEXAFRICA, a textile and real estate development company now known as TEXAF, in 1983. He serves as its co-managing director and is also a major shareholder, where he derives most of his wealth.

Since late 2010, he has served as the chairman of Congo's parastatal mining enterprise Gécamines. Under his leadership, he attempted to grow the company in spite of its international competitors. For example, he spearheaded a lawsuit in the International Court of Arbitration against Freeport-McMoRan after Freeport sold its 80% stake in the Tenke Fungurume mine to China Molybdenum, as it had failed to warn Gécamines, which owns 20% of the mine. As of September 2016, he planned to cut costs by reducing the workforce.

Yuma is the chairman of Texico, the manufacturer of police and army uniforms in the DRC, and deputy chairman of Texafrica, the manufacturer of uniforms for infrastructure workers. Additionally, he is the co-owner of Afritex, a wrapper factory in Kinshasa. In 2015, after he had failed to purchase the Orgaman Group from the Damseaux family because their asking price was too high, Yuma also invested in food production. He also serves on the board of directors of the Central Bank of the Congo.

In addition, Yuma serves as the chairman of the Congolese Employers Federation (FEC), and as the Vice-President of the International Organisation of Employers. Since 2012, he has also served as the chairman of the Permanent Conference of African and French-Speaking Consular Chambers (CPCCAF), an organization of francophone African chambers of commerce. Additionally, he serves on the board of directors of the Belgian-Congolese-Luxembourg Chamber of Commerce, and the council of the International Labour Organization.

Yuma has been alleged to siphon money from Gécamines toward supporters of Joseph Kabila. In 2018 the US State Department revoked Yuma's visa for corruption. He has been accused of diverting up to $8.8 billion of revenue from Congo's mining industry

In December 2021, Albert Yuma was ousted from the presidency of Gécamines.

== Awards ==
- Belgium: Commander of the Order of the Crown
