= Lukunga District =

- Kinshasa districts and communes, Lukunga to the west
- Coordinates: 4.3054°S 15.3032°E
- Country: DR Congo
- City-Province: Kinshasa

Lukunga is an area of the capital city of Kinshasa, Democratic Republic of the Congo, comprising seven of the city-province's twenty-four administrative divisions—the communes of Barumbu, Gombe, Kinshasa, Kintambo, Lingwala, Mont Ngafula and Ngaliema. It is one of the four so-called districts of Kinshasa. These were the administrative divisions of Kinshasa during much of the Mobutu years (1965-1997), around which a number of government systems and services are still organized. For instance, Lukunga makes up a fourteen-member National Assembly constituency designated as Kinshasa I. However, these districts are not part of Congo's territorial organization.

The district takes its name from the Lukunga River. This is a critical source of water for the district, compromised by silting.

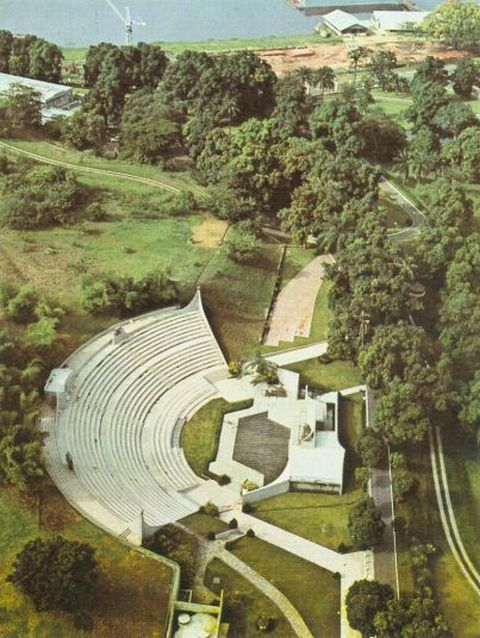
Théâtre de Verdure, an open-air theater in Ngaliema, 1974

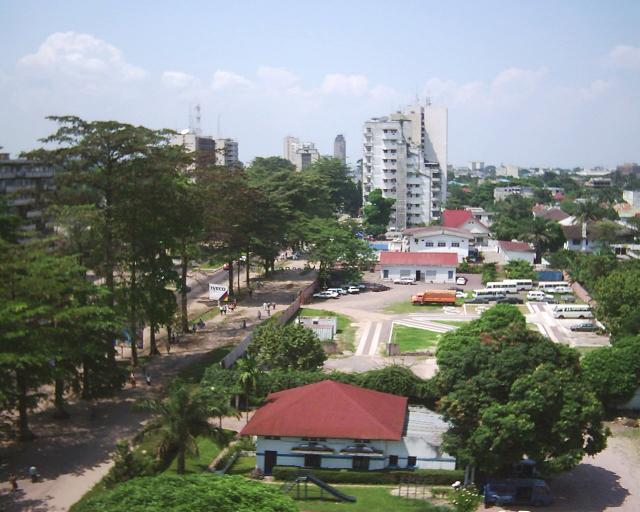
The boulevard of 30 June in Gombe, Kinshasa
