= African Union City =

Coordinates: 4.3319°S 15.2504°E

Cité de l'Union Africaine
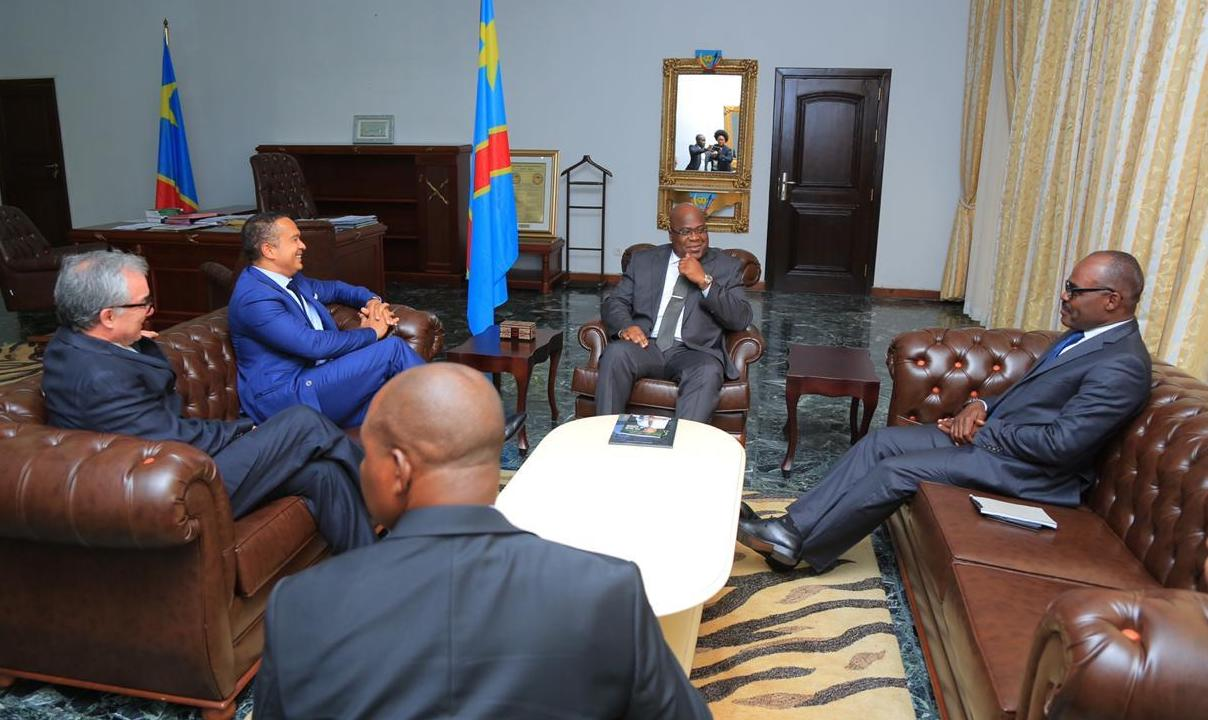
- Nicolas Kazadi, Luc-Gérard Nyafé, and Félix Tshisekedi inside Cité de l'OUA in 2019

General information
- Location: Ngaliema, Kinshasa, Democratic Republic of the Congo
- Current tenants: Félix Tshisekedi, President of the Democratic Republic of the Congo
- Construction started: 1967; 59 years ago
- Completed: September 1967; 59 years ago

The African Union City (French: Cité de l'OUA) is a governmental complex situated in the Ngaliema commune of Kinshasa, Democratic Republic of the Congo. It is located near Mont Ngaliema and serves as a venue for diplomatic and governmental functions.

The complex was commissioned by President Mobutu Sese Seko in 1967 when Kinshasa hosted the heads of state summit of the Organization of African Unity (OAU). Since then, it has served as the sanctum sanctorum for guests of the Congolese Head of State, as well as for the government's meetings and international summits held in Kinshasa.

== History ==
The establishment of the complex can be traced back to December of 1966 when President Mobutu extended an invitation to the Heads of State and governments across Africa, inviting them to the 1967 Assembly in Kinshasa, a convocation designed to showcase their support for the Congo and fortify his position domestically and internationally. On 9 February 1967, Boubacar Diallo Telli, the Guinean Secretary-General of the OAU, announced that Kinshasa had been chosen as the venue for the year's Assembly. This was achieved after thirty of the OAU member states had accepted the Congolese invitation, well over the two-thirds majority of the total membership of thirty-eight required as a quorum. The OAU City complex was constructed to accommodate participating Heads of State. Lumumba Boulevard, the city's arterial thoroughfare, was electrified to N'Djili International Airport. On 14 September 1967, despite Ivorian President Félix Houphouët-Boigny's boycott, 36 countries and 15 heads of state attended. The summit occurred amidst the eastern Congo political crisis and the Nigerian Civil War.

In 2009, the OAU City complex was rehabilitated by the China Railway Engineering Corporation (CREC) under President Joseph Kabila's administration, in anticipation of the Southern African Development Community (SADC) summit, which was held in Kinshasa the following September. The summit was attended by several African leaders, including Seretse Khama Ian Khama, Pakalitha Mosisili, Armando Emílio Guebuza, Hifikepunye Pohamba, Jacob Zuma, Mswati III, Rupiah B. Banda, Robert Mugabe, Antonio Paulo Kassoma, Eta Banda, Bernard Membe, Arvin Boolell, Patrick Pillay, Ketumile Masire, and Joaquim Alberto Chissano.

In 2010, the OAU City complex experienced another phase of rehabilitation during the celebrations commemorating the fiftieth anniversary of Congolese Independence Day. This period saw the erection of over forty villas, a hospital clinic, and several administrative edifices, all of which are stringently secured by the Republican Guard.

Félix Tshisekedi was inaugurated as President of the Democratic Republic of the Congo on 25 January 2019 and took up residence at the Cité de l'Union Africaine.
