= Nana Wanjau =

Kenyan philanthropist

- Born: October 26, 1979; Kenya
- Occupations: Philanthropist, businesswoman
- Years active: 2005–present
- Organization(s): PowerWoman International; Branding Beyond Borders; Saltaway Investments Ltd
- Known for: Founder of PowerWoman International and advocacy for widows’ welfare
- Title: President, Rotary Club of Nairobi East (2015–2016); Chairperson, Commonwealth Business Women Africa
- Awards: East Africa Woman Leadership Award (2019)

Nana Wanjau is a Kenyan philanthropist known for her work as president of the Rotary Club of Nairobi East and for her founding of the non-profit Power Woman International that works to help widows in Kenya.

== Early life ==
Wanjau was born on October 26, 1979, to a Kenyan father and a Tanzanian mother. At early age, she was raised by her grandmother in Bukoba, Tanzania. When her grandfather died, the community forced her grandmother to leave the community because of her grandmother's position as a widow. After her high school years, Wanjau went to stay with her mother in Lusaka, Zambia. Her mother, a medical doctor, influenced her to enroll to medical college and study medicine. Wanjau attended the program for 1 year before dropping out of college. Subsequently, she moved to Ivory Coast where her father was based, at the age of 21, her father’s work brought him back home, so Nana came to Kenya and settled.

== Career ==
Wanjau initially worked in information technology, but then became a stay at home mom. She became interested in charitable work after watching her mother run a medical clinic in Zambia. She joined the Rotary Club in 2005, and served as president of Rotary Club of Nairobi East, Kenya for one year long, from 2015 until 2016. In this period she worked to expand libraries in Korogocho, and she joined a group of people who climbed Mount Kilimanjaro to raise funds for charity.

In January 2023, she was appointed as chairperson at Commonwealth Business Women Africa, and in this role she worked to increase digital literacy for girls. In 2022 Wanjau talked about the organization's role in promoting gender equality for women in Africa. As of 2023, she was chief gender officer at Pan African Chamber of Commerce.

After completing her term as president of the Rotary Club, she started Power Women International, a non-profit that aides widows in Kenya. The organization helps widows remain in their communities through building houses and providing training, a need Wanjau recognized because her of experience as a young child and further developed in Wanjau's conversations with widows.

She also founded Branding Beyond Borders (network for various professionals), and Saltaway Investments Ltd, a Kenyan real estate company.

== Honors and awards ==
Wanjau is the winner of 2019 East Africa Woman Leadership Award.
