= Ngaliema =

- Commune
- Commune de Ngaliema
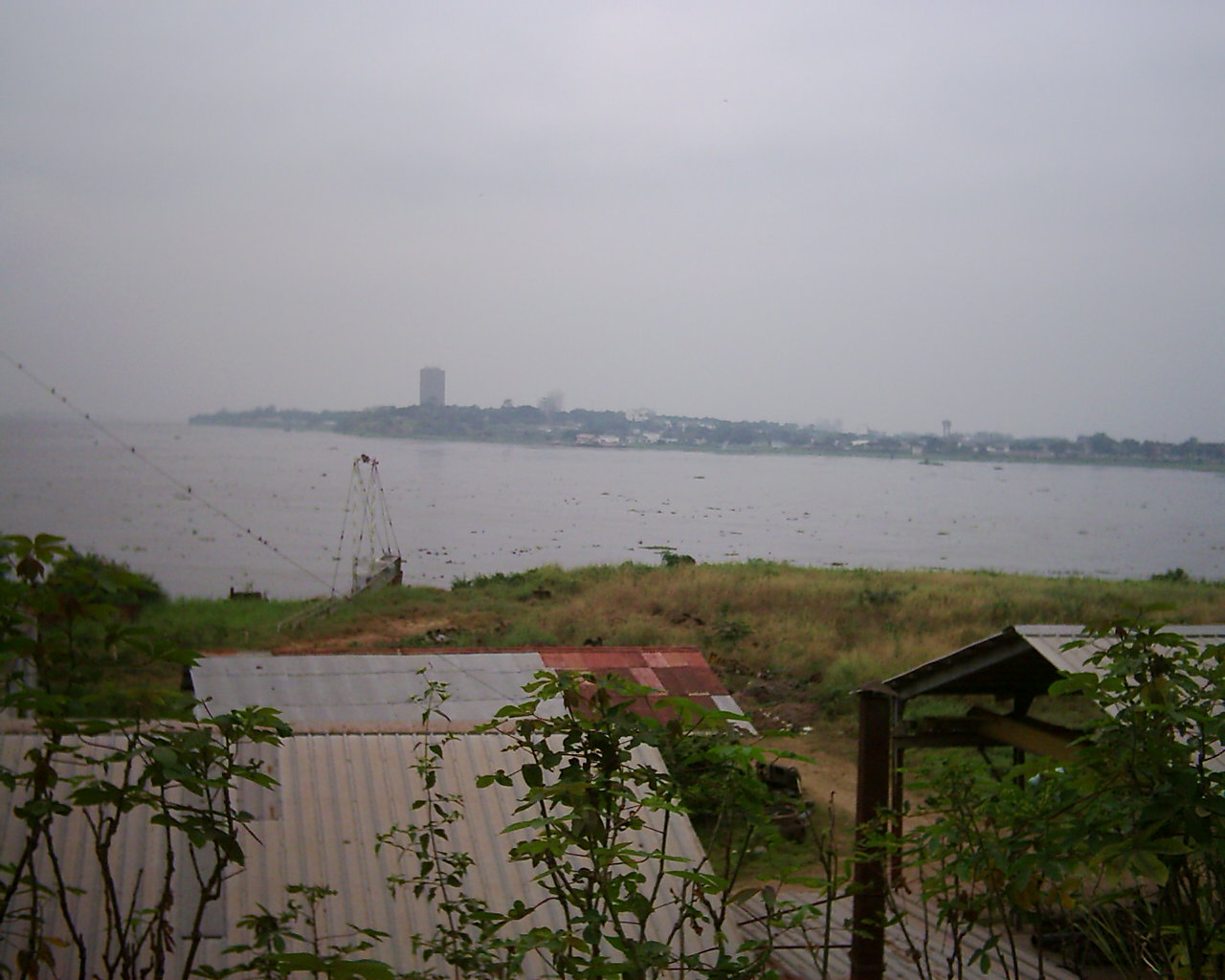
- Ngaliema Bay
- Ngaliema on map of Kinshasa city-province
- Location in DR Congo
- Coordinates: 04°20′56″S 15°15′10″E
- Country: DR Congo
- City-Province: Kinshasa

Area
  - Total: 224.3 km^{2} (86.6 sq mi)

Population (2015 est.)
  - Total: 2,025,942
  - Density: 9,032/km^{2} (23,390/sq mi)

Ngaliema is a commune in the Lukunga District of Kinshasa. Covering an area of approximately 224.3 square kilometers, it is one of Kinshasa's largest communes and had an estimated population of 2,025,942 as of 2015, making it the second-most populous commune. Established on 12 October 1957, Ngaliema was officially delineated by Ministerial Decree No. 69-042 of 23 January 1969 and is currently governed under Decree-Laws No. 82-006 and 82-008 of 29 January 1982, which define the administrative and political organization of the country and the status of Kinshasa.

The commune is composed of 21 quartiers (neighborhoods) and is bordered by the Republic of the Congo to the north, Mont-Ngafula to the south and southeast, Kintambo and Gombe to the east, and the Congo and Lukunga Rivers to the west. Its name originates from a Brazzaville native, Ngaliema, who settled in the area after defeating a local chief, Lingwala, prior to the arrival of the Welsh-American explorer Henry Morton Stanley.

== Geography ==
Ngaliema is situated within a landscape of hills and valleys, featuring some of the highest elevations in western Kinshasa. The terrain is marked by significant erosion in certain areas. The commune's boundaries are largely defined by natural and infrastructural landmarks. To the north, Ngaliema borders the Republic of the Congo along the Congo River, extending from the confluence with the Lukunga River to the confluence with the Gombe River. From this point, a straight boundary line separates it from the commune of Gombe. The northern boundary continues along a high-voltage power line toward the western edge of the Colonel Kokolo Military Camp, proceeding past the Bandalungwa River and a railway intersection near Sport Street. The western boundary follows the Lukunga River southward until it meets the Congo River, forming a straight-line border. To the south, the boundary extends toward the Bikela River, following it to its confluence with the Lukunga River in the Mont-Ngafula commune. The eastern border runs along Kikwit Avenue to the Lubudi River, then upstream to its source, continuing by a straight line south to Laurent-Désiré Kabila Avenue and connecting with the source of the Bikela River.

=== Hydrography and soils ===
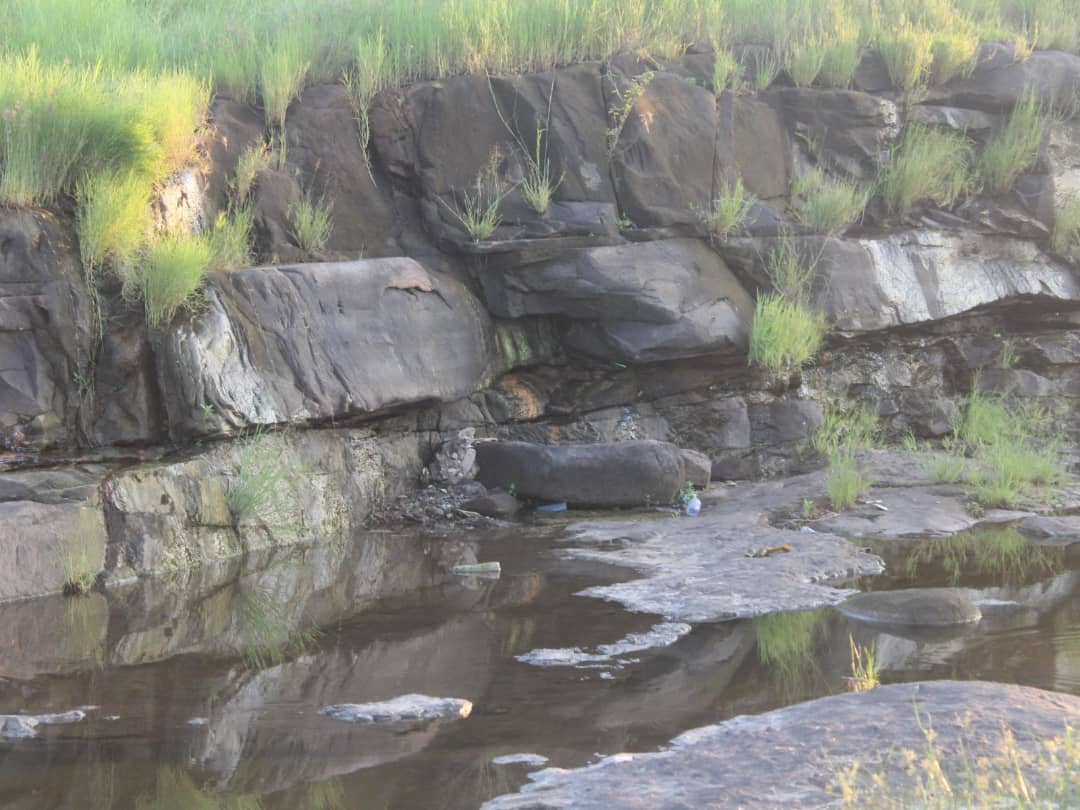
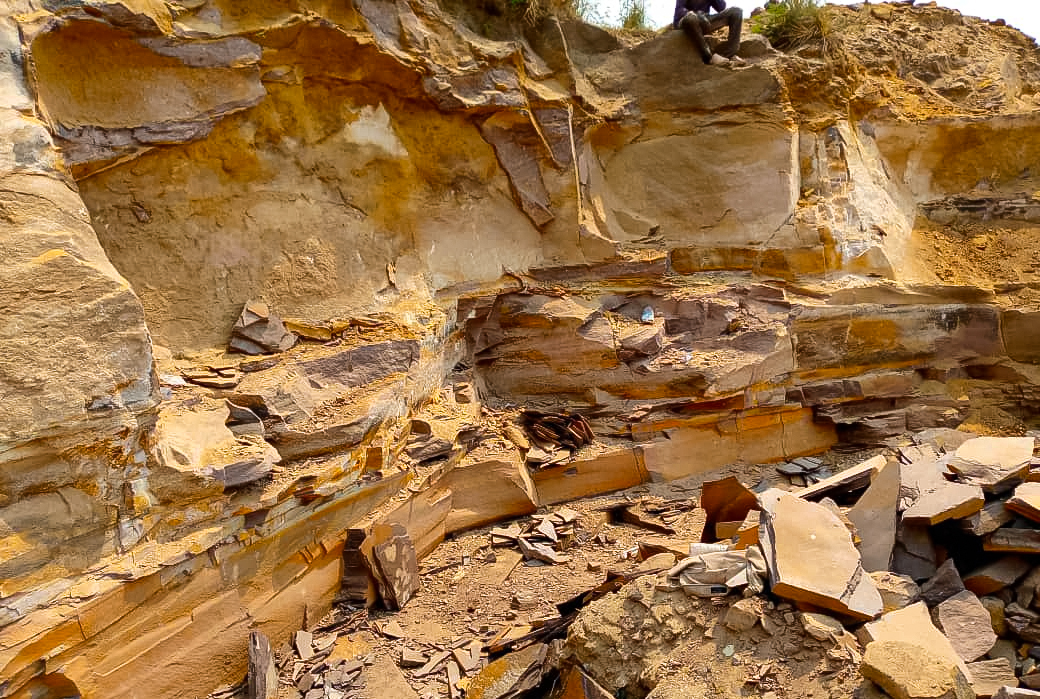
The rocks on the bank of the Congo River from Kinsuka-Pêcheur quartier in Ngaliema

Ngaliema's hydrographic network is primarily composed of boundary-defining rivers, rather than internal waterways. The most prominent rivers include the Lukunga, the Binza, and the Makelele, each of which forms natural borders with adjacent communes. These rivers are integral to the region's drainage system, particularly during the rainy season, when heavy downpours intensify flooding and erosion.

The soil composition across Ngaliema is predominantly a mix of clay and sand, with notable variation depending on the topography. Certain zones are characterized by heavier clay content, showing greater water retention, while others are dominated by more porous and less stable sandy soils.

=== Climate ===
Ngaliema experiences a typical equatorial tropical climate, typified by high humidity and persistently warm temperatures throughout the year. The climatic cycle is split into two primary seasons: a rainy season and a dry season. The rainy season spans roughly eight months, from mid-September to mid-May, and is characterized by intense and frequent rainfall that contributes to soil degradation and the swelling of rivers. The dry season, lasting from mid-May to mid-September, brings a marked decline in precipitation and a modest reduction in humidity levels. Nevertheless, temperatures remain relatively constant year-round.

Due to its steep slopes, weak sandy soils, and prolonged wet periods, Ngaliema is particularly prone to erosion. Large gullies and ravines, some of which pose threats to residential areas, roads, and public infrastructure, are a recurring issue. This environmental vulnerability is also aggravated by rapid, often unregulated urban expansion, deforestation on hillsides, and inadequate drainage infrastructure.

=== Administrative structure and governance ===
Ngaliema, like all communes within Kinshasa, functions as a decentralized territorial entity (entité territoriale décentralisée, ETD) possessing legal personality and administrative autonomy. Its governance structure is centered on two principal bodies: the Conseil Communal (Communal Council) and the Collège Exécutif Communal (Communal Executive College).

The Conseil Communal serves as the commune's deliberative assembly. It is composed of members known as conseillers communaux, who are elected by direct universal suffrage. The council's responsibilities include debating and deciding on matters of communal interest across economic, social, cultural, and technical sectors. It also elects the bourgmestre (mayor) and bourgmestre-adjoint (deputy mayor) through indirect suffrage and oversees the implementation of policies and programs executed by the commune's executive branch.

The Collège Exécutif Communal, led by the bourgmestre and assisted by the deputy mayor, acts as the executive organ responsible for the daily administration of the commune. It also includes two échevins communaux (aldermen), appointed based on competence, credibility, and community representation. This body executes decisions adopted by the council and manages local governance under the broader authority of the Governor of Kinshasa.

Ngaliema is divided into 21 quartiers (quarters), which are also subdivided into avenues. The size and layout of these quartiers vary, with planned urban quartiers generally following a formal grid pattern, while semi-urban or informal areas tend to be larger and form part of Kinshasa's urban sprawl. Each quartier is managed by a local administration composed of a chef de quartier, deputy, secretary, population officer, and a team of enumerators (agents recenseurs). These officials are appointed by the Governor of Kinshasa.

No.	Quartiers
1.	Lukunga
2.	Ngomba Kikusa
3.	Bumba
4.	Binza-Pigeon
5.	Djelo Binza
6.	Bangu
7.	Punda
8.	Kimpe
9.	Anciens Combattants
10.	Basoko
11.	Congo
12.	Joli Parc
13.	Kinkenda
14.	Kinsuka Pêcheur
15.	Lonzo
16.	Musey
17.	Mama-Yemo
18.	Manenga
19.	Mfinda
20.	Monganga
21.	Lubudi

Source: Report from the Commune of Ngaliema (2009)

== Economy ==
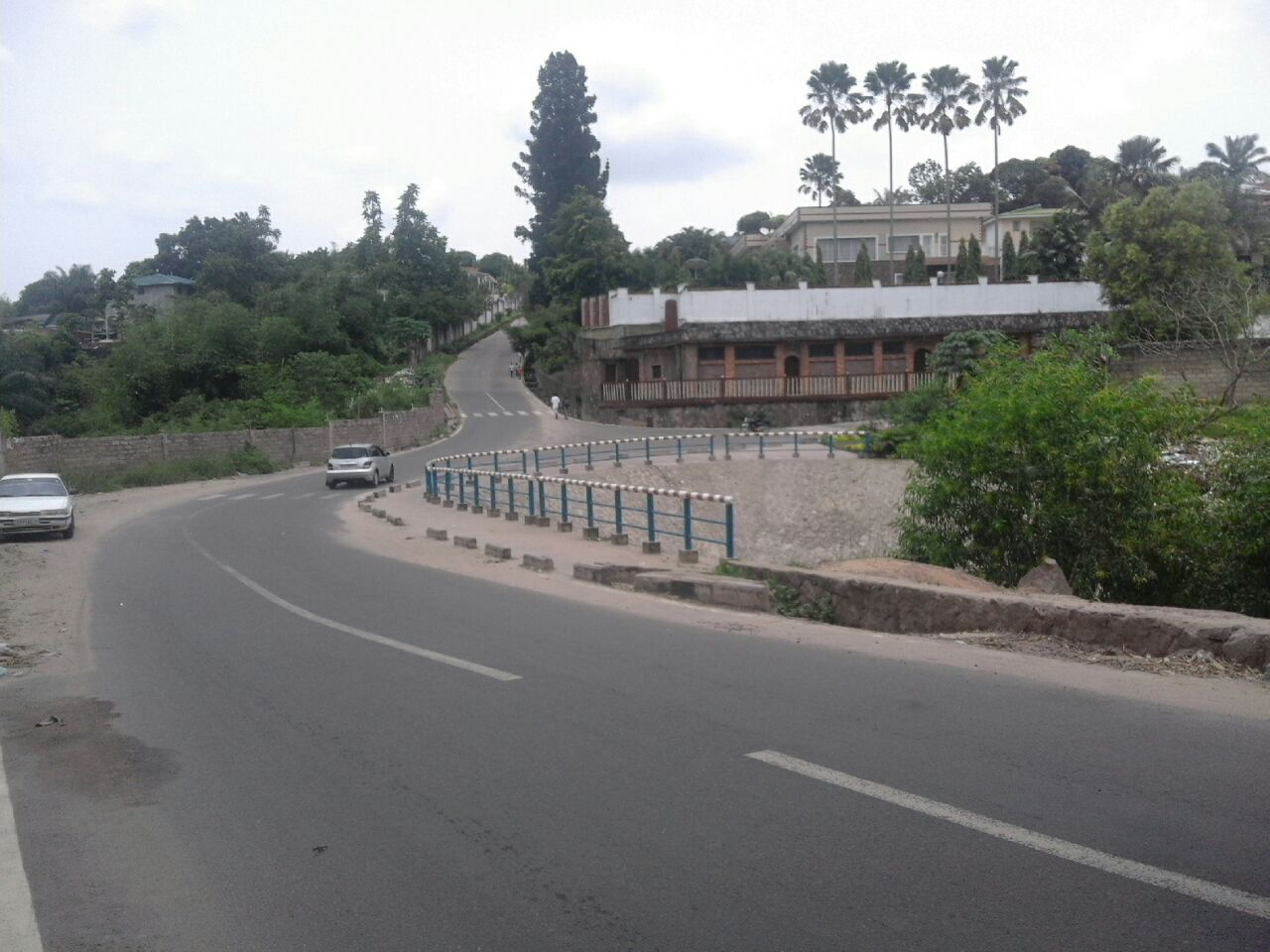
Avenue Ma Campagne is a street located in the northeast of Ngaliema

Ngaliema serves as a residential and industrial hub within Kinshasa, characterized by a mix of upscale quartiers and industrial zones. The commune is home to members of the upper bourgeoisie and high-income earners, which makes it one of the city's more affluent areas. Many of its quartiers are mixed-use, where factories coexist alongside well-developed residential areas, connected by a network of paved roads. However, the commune also bears traces of unregulated urban expansion, especially in the aftermath of Congolese independence in 1960. Spontaneous settlements emerged in areas unsuitable for construction, such as hillsides, wetlands, and flood zones, often in violation of urban planning laws. This disorderly urbanization was driven by several factors, including the sudden exodus of colonial administrators, unauthorized land sales by traditional chiefs and local officials, the instability of the post-independence civil war, and rapid rural-to-urban migration. The resulting housing crisis accelerated the creation of informal settlements such as Kinsuka Pêcheurs quartier.

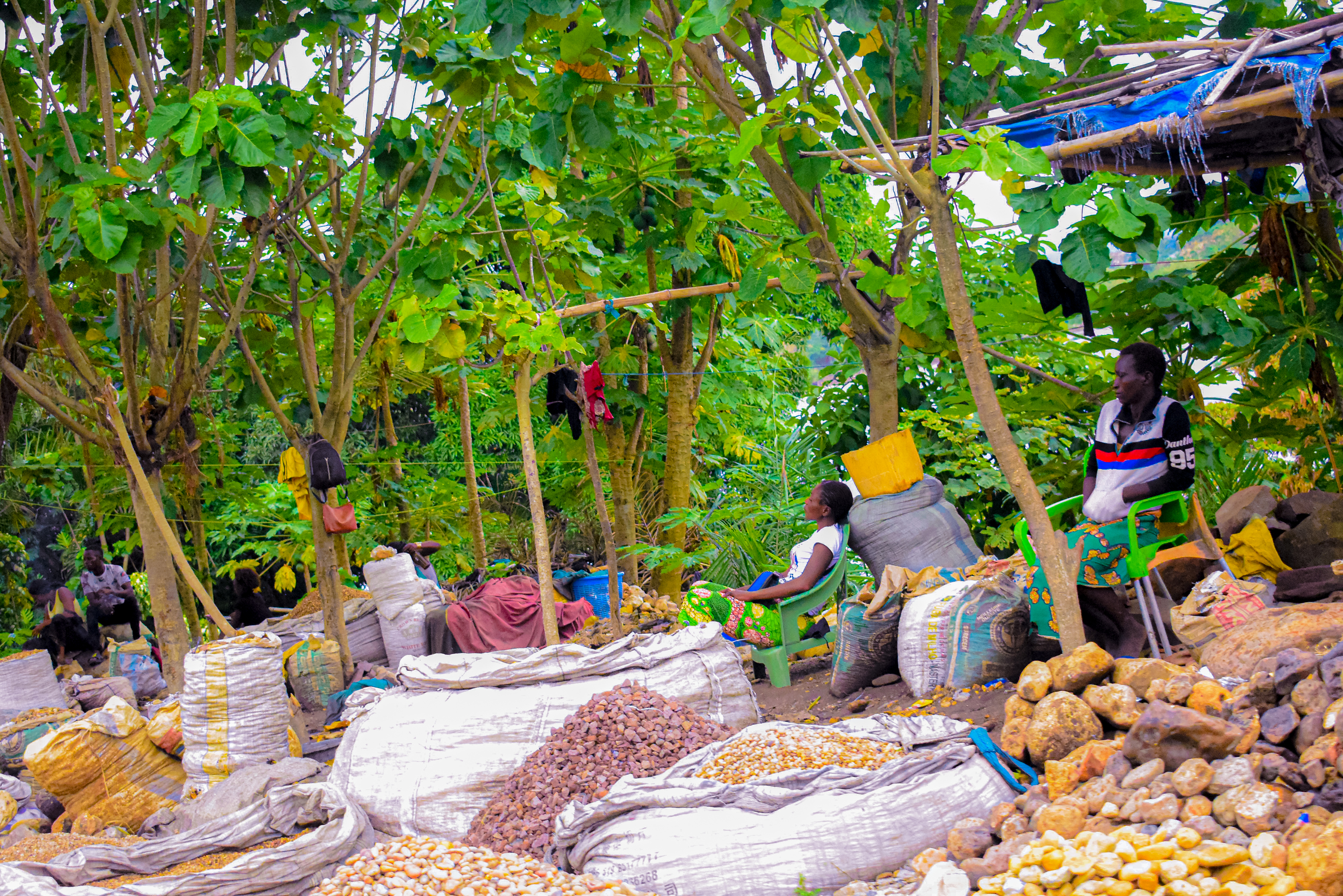
Gravel trade along Avenue du Tourisme in Ngaliema

In addition to its residential and industrial functions, Ngaliema contributes to Kinshasa's urban agriculture through its involvement in the Green Belt and Presidential Valleys (Ceintures Vertes et Vallées Présidentielles; CVVP) program, launched in 1972 as part of a broader governmental initiative to promote food security and urban horticulture. This initiative sought to develop productive agricultural zones around Kinshasa, including areas within Ngaliema. The Lukunga site, located in the Lukunga quartier, became a focal point for market gardening activities in the commune. The program was supported by French cooperation and institutionalized through the establishment of CECOMAF (Centre de Coopération Maraîchère de Kinshasa), an organization tasked with land management, infrastructure oversight, and the dissemination of modern agricultural techniques. Although CECOMAF faced limitations in product commercialization, it facilitated the organization of over 8,000 market gardeners into 12 cooperatives. These cooperatives focus primarily on cultivating fast-growing crops, such as amaranth (biteku-teku), sweet potato leaves (matembele), roselle (ngai-ngai), spinach, and chives, which are staples in the diet of Kinshasa residents.

=== Tourism ===
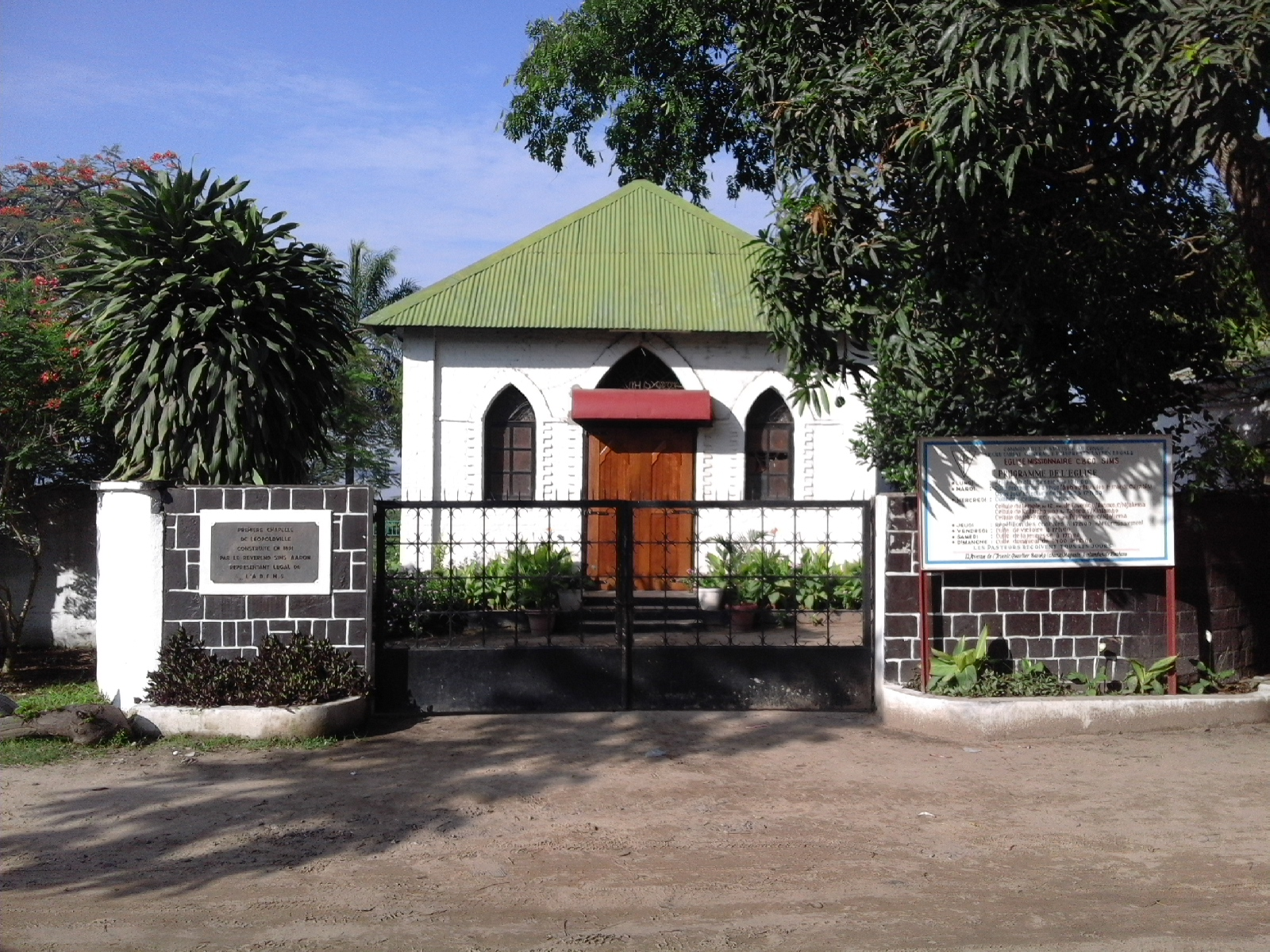
Sims Chapel, located on Avenue de l'Avenir in the Basoko quartier (neighborhood) of Ngaliema, is the first Christian building ever constructed in the city.

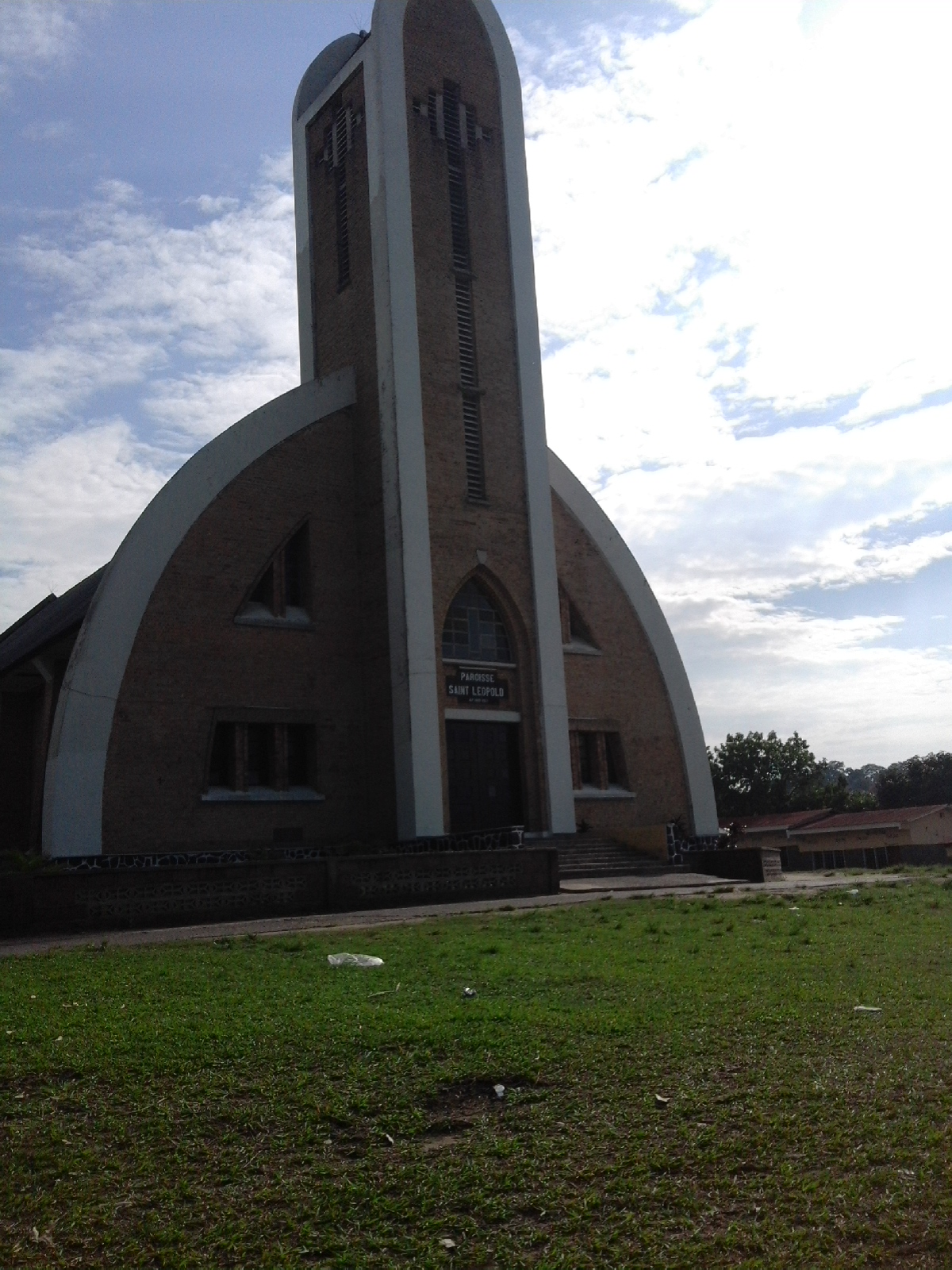
Saint-Léopold catholic parish in Ngaliema

Ngaliema is the most ancient and historically significant commune in the city. It is the site where Welsh-American explorer Henry Morton Stanley first established an encampment that later evolved into modern-day Kinshasa.

The commune is home to several significant cultural and historical attractions. Among these landmarks are Sims Chapel (1891), established by Reverend Aaron Sims of the American Baptist Foreign Mission Society and considered the first Christian structure in Kinshasa; the Saint-Léopold catholic parish, founded in 1899; and the Institute of National Museums of Congo, which preserves and exhibits national artifacts and historical collections.

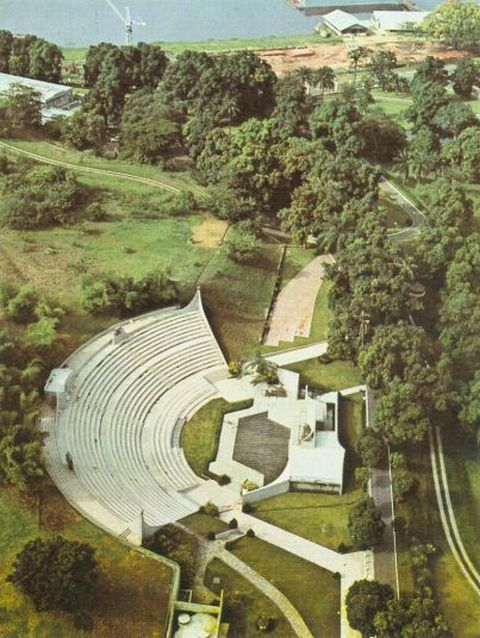
The Théâtre de la Verdure in 1974

The Marble Palace, originally a guest residence during Mobutu Sese Seko's regime and later the official presidential residence under Laurent-Désiré Kabila, is located within the commune. Nearby is the Colonel Tshatshi Military Camp, a military complex housing the Ministry of Defense and the joint Chief of Staff of the Armed Forces of the Democratic Republic of the Congo (FARDC), as well as a Republican Guard military hospital. Adjacent to the camp is the traditional presidential residence, situated on Mount Ngaliema (formerly Mount Stanley during the colonial era) initially used as the residence of the governor of the former Léopoldville. Following Congolese independence in 1960, the site became the residence of the Republic's first president, Joseph Kasa-Vubu. In 1966, under President Mobutu, the site was renamed Mont Ngaliema and redeveloped as a Parc Présidentiel (Presidential Park), with landscaping and garden designs by the Franco-Tunisian architect Olivier-Clément Cacoub. The park was adorned with statues of historical figures such as Leopold II of Belgium and Henry Morton Stanley, and featured the Théâtre de la Verdure, an open-air amphitheater modeled on classical Greco-Roman designs, completed in 1970. The presidential palace and surrounding complex were subject to extensive looting in 1997, following the collapse of the Mobutu regime during the First Congo War. Ngaliema also contains the African Union City, a complex established in September 1967 to host heads of state attending the Organization of African Unity (OAU) summit held in Kinshasa.

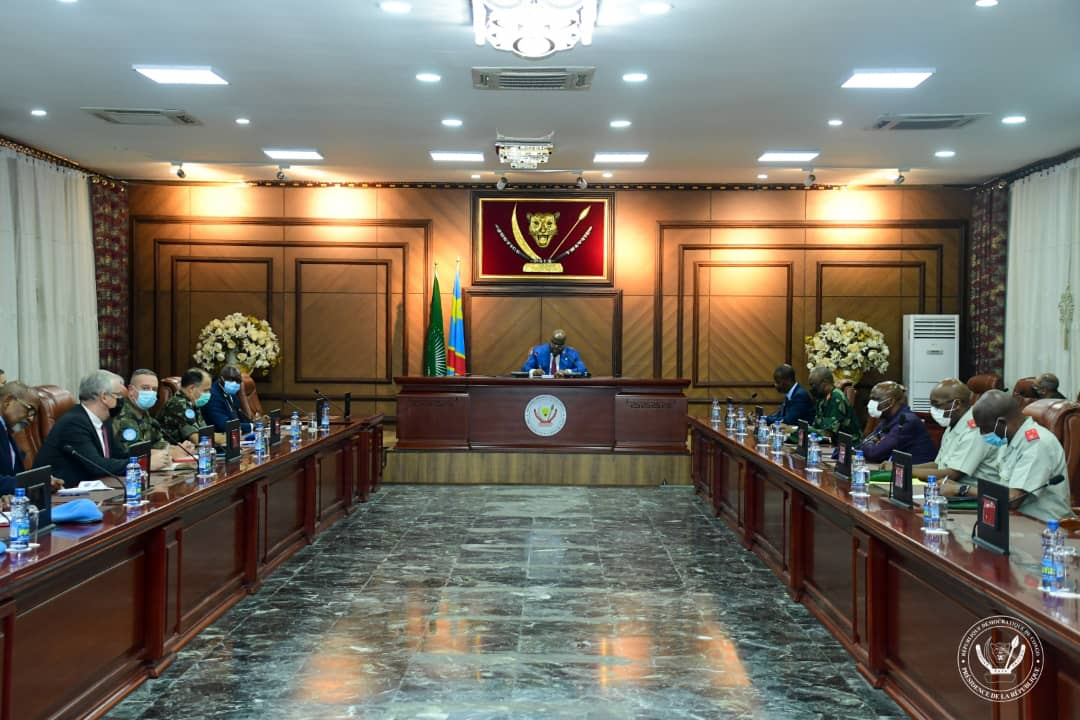
African Union City

Other notable sites include the Cimetière des Pionniers (Pioneers' Cemetery) and remnants of colonial infrastructure such as the original shipyard and port, as well as the Kintambo-Magasins commercial center.

Ngaliema is home to the terminus of an old caravan route and communal buildings, which were originally constructed in 1930 as the first hospital for Europeans in the region. The commune also showcases artisanal craftsmanship through furniture workshops using kekele liana, along with natural attractions known as the Symphonies Naturelles.

== Demographics ==
=== Population and languages ===
Ngaliema has experienced significant demographic growth over the past two decades. In 2005, the population was estimated at 518,821 inhabitants, increasing to 555,770 by 2008.

Historical population
Year	1967	1970	1984	2003	2004
Pop.	30,640	63,844	252,151	660,646	683,135
±%	—	+108.4%	+294.9%	+162.0%	+3.4%

In 2009, Ngaliema's population was distributed across its 21 quartiers (neighborhoods), with notable variations in size and density. The most populous quartiers included Binza-Pigeon (39,197), Bumba (38,435), Lukunga (35,720), and Manenga (31,802), each surpassing 30,000 inhabitants and representing key centers of urban concentration. Other sizeable quartiers include Monganga (28,185), Musey (28,608), Ngomba Kikusa (27,542), and Lonzo (24,475). Mid-sized quartiers included Anciens Combattants (22,686), Punda (20,386), Congo (19,591), and Djelo Binza (17,618), with populations ranging between 15,000 and 23,000. Basoko (8,342), Kinkenda (4,166), Mama-Yemo (3,569), Mfinda (3,837), Kinsuka Pêcheur (2,690), and Lubudi (2,344) represented the least populated quartiers, with the smallest being Joli Parc, which had only 1,859 residents.

No.	Quartiers (neighborhoods)	Population (2009 est)
1.	Lukunga	35,720
2.	Ngomba Kikusa	27,542
3.	Bumba	38,435
4.	Binza-Pigeon	39,197
5.	Djelo Binza	17,618
6.	Bangu	12,845
7.	Punda	20,386
8.	Kimpe	15,783
9.	Anciens Combattants	22,686
10.	Basoko	8,342
11.	Congo	19,591
12.	Joli Parc	1,859
13.	Kinkenda	4,166
14.	Kinsuka Pêcheur	2,690
15.	Lonzo	24,475
16.	Musey	28,608
17.	Mama-Yemo	3,569
18.	Manenga	31,802
19.	Mfinda	3,837
20.	Monganga	28,185
21.	Lubudi	2,344

Source: Report from the Commune of Ngaliema (2009)

By 2015, the number of residents had risen sharply to an estimated 2,025,942, making Ngaliema one of the most densely populated and rapidly growing communes in the capital.

Linguistically, Lingala served as the most widely spoken language in daily communication and urban life. French, the official language of the Democratic Republic of the Congo, is used in administration, education, and formal settings. Tshiluba and Kikongo are also commonly spoken among communities originating from other regions of the country.

=== Religion ===
Religious affiliation is marked by a mix of traditional Christian denominations and newer revivalist movements. The principal faith communities include the Roman Catholic Church, Protestant churches, and the Kimbanguist Church. In recent decades, however, revival or "églises de réveil" (born-again churches) have gained widespread popularity, attracting large followings despite the longstanding presence of traditional churches.

=== Education ===
Ngaliema is home to a wide array of educational institutions, ranging from preschool to university level. Among its notable schools is the American School of Kinshasa (TASOK), one of the leading international schools in the country, and the public Université Pédagogique Nationale, the DRC's first pedagogical university. Other private institutions include the Ecole Internationale Bilingue le Cartésien and the Groupe Scolaire Aurore-Matanelo, the latter of which operates campuses in Ngaliema and Limete, offering primary, secondary, and humanities education. The commune also hosts several public and religious institutions, including the Bobokoli Institute, entrusted to the Marist Brothers, which was initially established as a primary school but expanded to secondary education in 1973. Although its literature section was transferred to Collège Boboto shortly thereafter, the institute specialized in the sciences and, over time, introduced specialized streams such as mathematics and physics for boys and girls.

Other significant establishments include the Lycée Tobongisa, Complexe Scolaire Mafuta, Collège Don Bosco de Lukunga, and Collège Saint Cyprien primary school. The commune also hosts the Institut Technique Professionnel Ngaliema (ITP), which traces its roots back to 1920, when it was founded as a vocational school. It later evolved into the Centre de Spécialisation Professionnelle (CSP) before being restructured as ITP in 2000. Ngaliema also serves as the headquarters of the Group of Military Higher Schools (GESM).

== Embassies ==
The French Embassy in the Democratic Republic of the Congo is located in the northern part of the commune, at 1 Colonel Mondjiba Avenue, in the Basoko quartier, near the border with Gombe.

The Lebanese Embassy is located in the Joli Parc quartier, Ma Campagne, at 19 Joli Parc Avenue.
