= Lukunga River =

Location
- Country: Democratic Republic of the Congo
- City: Kinshasa

Physical characteristics
- Mouth: Congo River
  - coordinates: 4.34607°S 15.20610°E

The Lukunga River (French: Rivière Lukunga) is a river that flows through the capital city of Kinshasa in the Democratic Republic of the Congo, a tributary of the Congo River. Kinshasa lies on a plain that is surrounded by hills, drained by many rivers. Of these, the Lukunga is one of the more important, and for this reason gives its name to the Lukunga District of the city.

The river originates to the west at an elevation of 520 metres (1,710 ft) in the hills of Ngomba Kikusa, in the commune of Ngaliema. It is no wider than 10 metres (33 ft) and is never deeper than 2 metres (6.6 ft) due to constant deposits of sediment. The river drains Ngaliema, the Mama Mobutu neighborhood and part of Mont-Ngafula, and forms the boundary between Ngaliema and Mont-Ngafule. On its right bank the Lukunga is fed first by the Ikusu River, which has its source at a height of 400 metres (1,300 ft) and then by the Mbinza River, which rises at a height of 480 metres (1,570 ft).

Before independence, one of the two water treatment plants for Leopoldville, now Kinshasa, was on the Lukunga river at Kinsuka in the Ngaliema district. The station had been designed to last for 30 years with normal maintenance, but was in very poor shape by 1985. The station was built in 1939, and supplies about 48,000 cubic metres (13,000,000 US gal) of drinking water annually for a population of at least 500,0000. The catchment area was protected by dense forest cover until the 1970s. Since then, unplanned agriculture and building have exposed the steep and sandy soils to erosion by heavy rainfalls, raising levels of turbidity to the point where the station must halt operations. Frequent dredging is needed to keep the channel open, as well as use of imported chemical coagulants and lime to make the water drinkable.

== Sources ==
- Nzuzi, Francis Lelo (2008). Kinshasa: ville et environnement. Editions L'Harmattan. ISBN 978-2-296-06080-7.
- Trefon, Theodore (2004). Reinventing order in the Congo: how people respond to state failure in Kinshasa. Zed Books. ISBN 1-84277-491-3.
- "Watershed degradation increases water treatment costs". UNEP DR Congo. 2008.
