= Kinshasa Botanical Garden =

Botanical park in Kinshasa

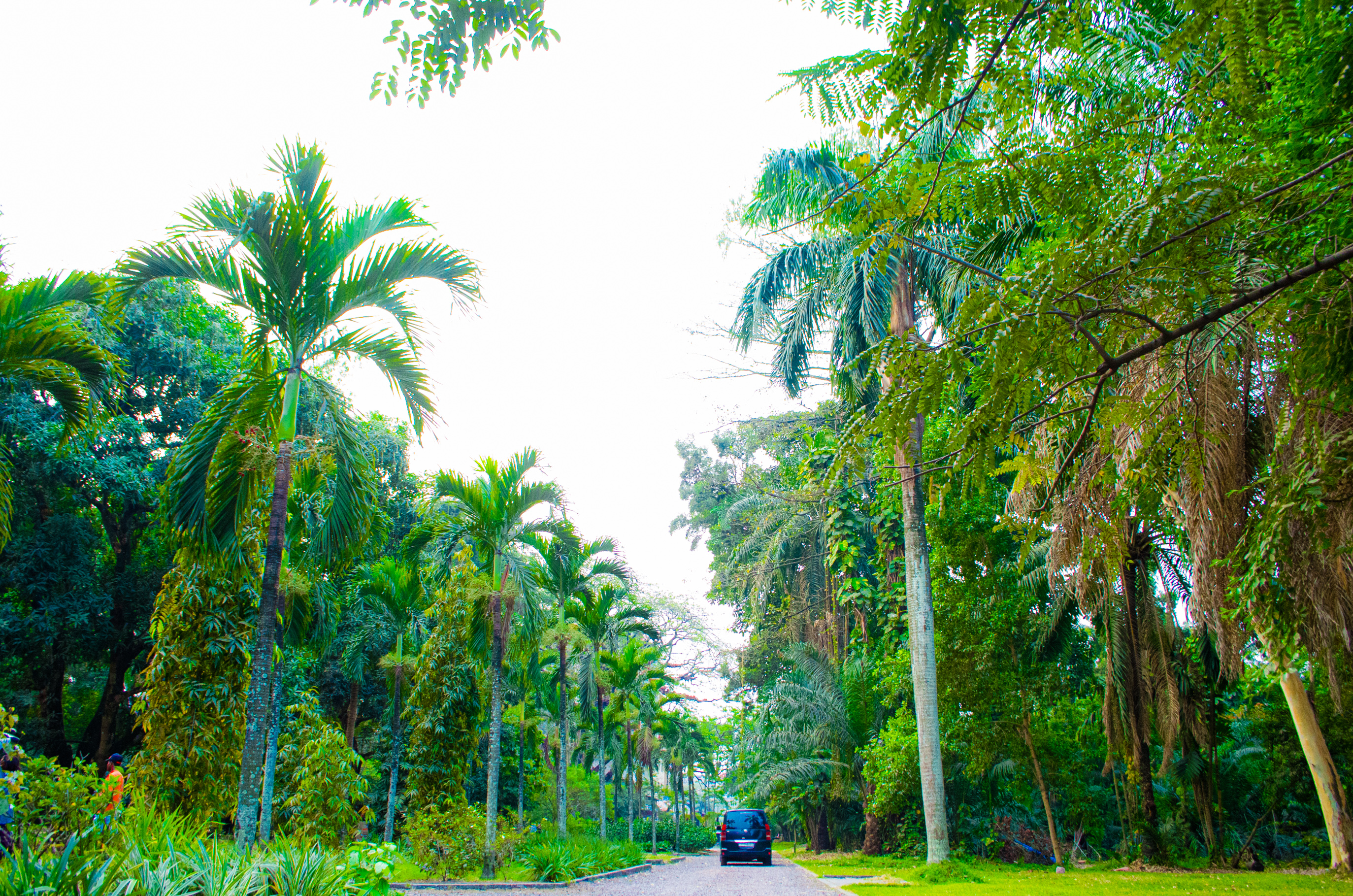
- Interactive map of Kinshasa Botanical Garden
- Location: Ave Kasa-Vubu, Gombe, Kinshasa
- Coordinates: 04°18′36″S 15°18′36″E
- Area: 19.768 acres (8.000 ha)
- Created: 1933; 93 years ago
- Founder: Fernand De Bock
- Operator: Congolese Institute for the Conservation of Nature
- Open: Dawn to dusk
- Status: Open all year

The Kinshasa Botanical Garden (French: Jardin botanique de Kinshasa, abbreviated as JBK), formerly known as the Fernand De Boeck Park and Parc de la Révolution, is a botanical garden located in Gombe, Kinshasa, in the western part of the Democratic Republic of the Congo. The garden was established in 1933 and covers approximately 8 hectares, although 1 hectare is now used by shops connected to the nearby Kinshasa Central Market. It is strategically located opposite the Kinshasa Zoological Garden on Kasa-Vubu Avenue, and is bounded by Avenue du Commerce to the north, Rwakadingi Avenue to the south, Avenue des Marais to the east, and Kasa-Vubu Avenue to the west.

JBK is managed by the Congolese Institute for the Conservation of Nature (Institut Congolais pour la Conservation de la Nature, ICCN), and is used for both science and education. It contains 286 plant species and includes a nursery, a seed bank, a herbarium, and an arboretum that focuses on native flora and is home to more than 100 tree species.

== Administrative organization ==
The Kinshasa Botanical Garden is managed by a Director and is divided into several departments. The Botanical Department takes care of the nursery and manages horticultural activities. The Administrative Department handles JBK's daily operations, while the Financial Department is responsible for its budget and property. The Marketing Department promotes the garden to the public. The garden also has an Environmental Education Service that teaches visitors about nature and the importance of environmental conservation.

=== Administrative service ===
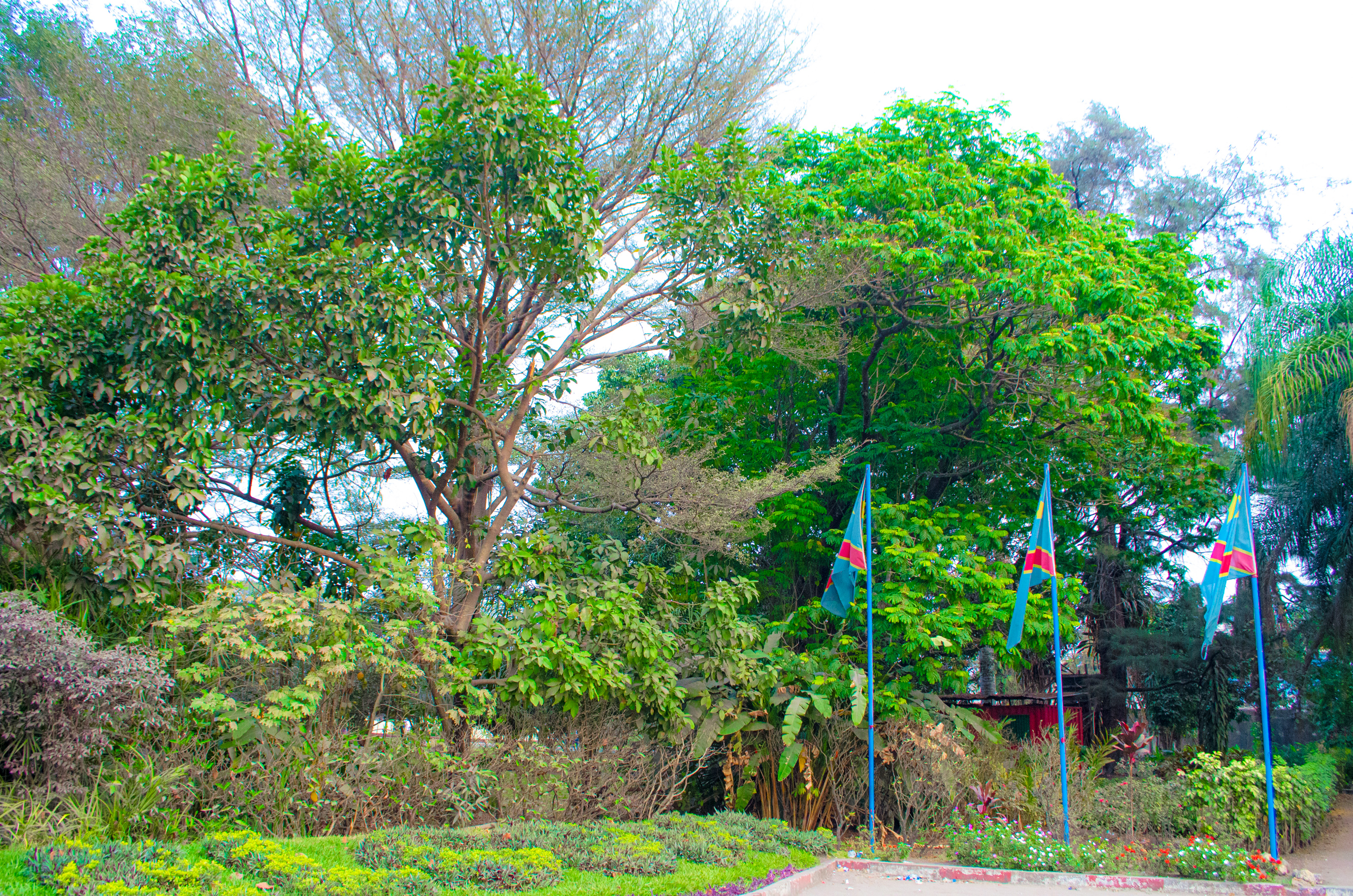
Kinshasa Botanical Garden in 2022

The administrative service manages JBK's staff and administrative work. It is led by the head of personnel, also known as the administrative department head, who oversees employees, handles administrative concerns, and enforces company discipline. The head also prepares monthly reports on employee attendance and conduct, and may give rewards or apply disciplinary actions when needed.

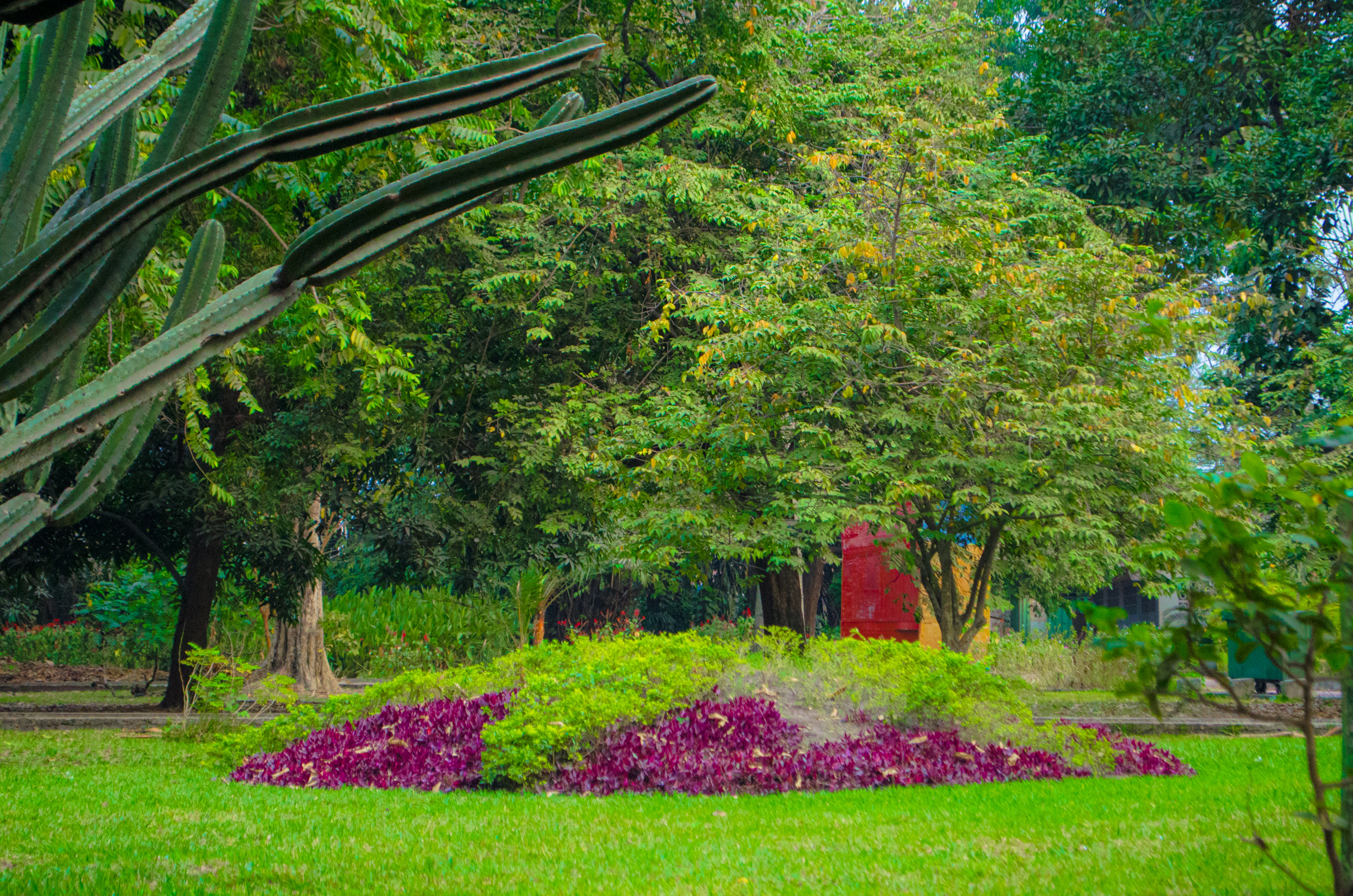
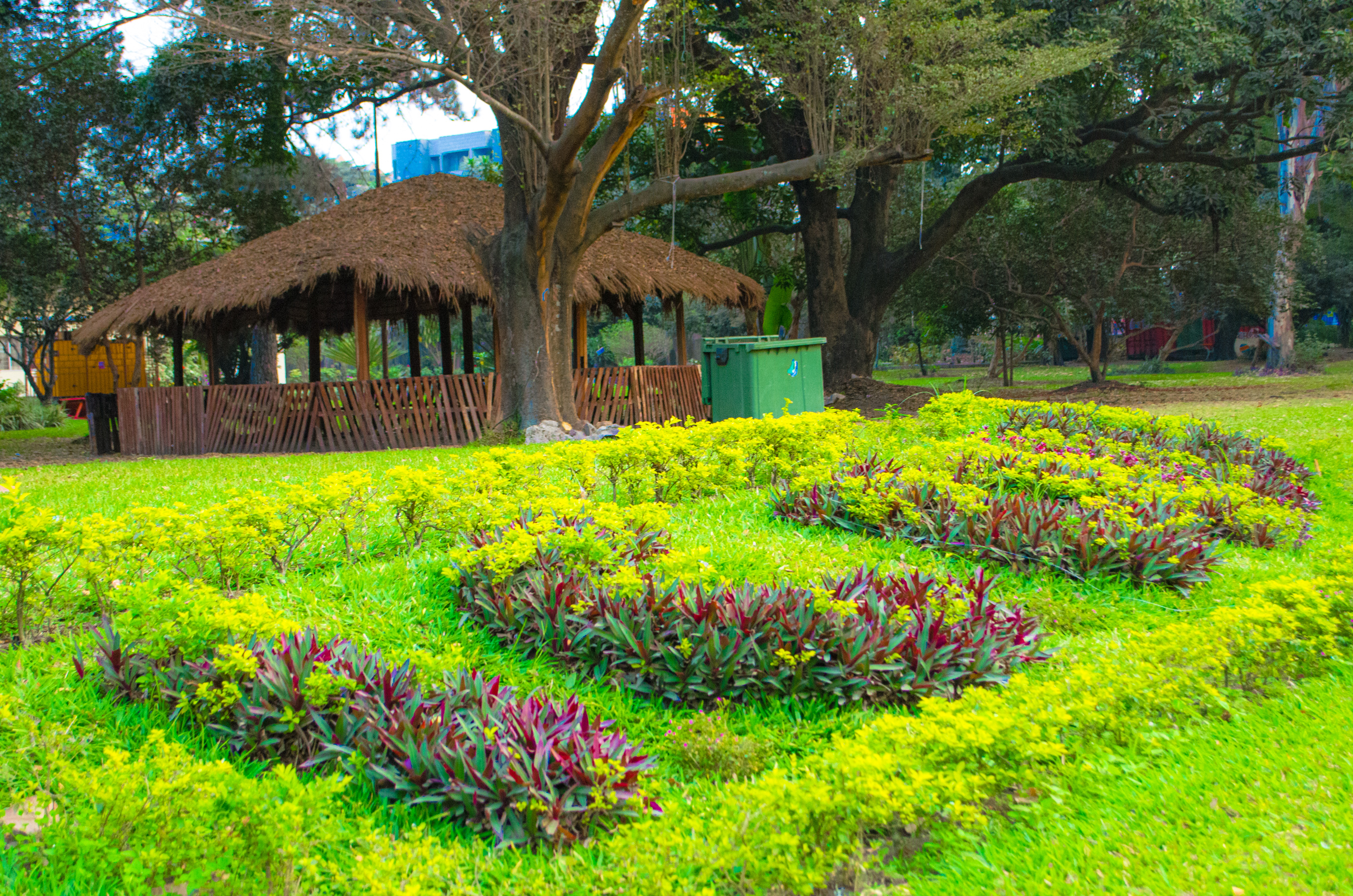
The JBK's lush greenery

Employee discipline is structured around a weekly or monthly schedule, and personnel are expected to report to duty on all assigned days, barring unforeseen circumstances. In the event of an absence, the employee must inform the personnel department of the reason. An attendance book is also maintained to serve as a record of each employee's presence. JBK also operates an on-site health center that provides care to employees and their family members. Should an employee fall ill, they are required to obtain a sick note from the head of personnel to qualify for treatment. Failure to do so results in the absence being deemed invalid, and disciplinary action may be taken in accordance with the company's regulations.

=== Botanical service ===
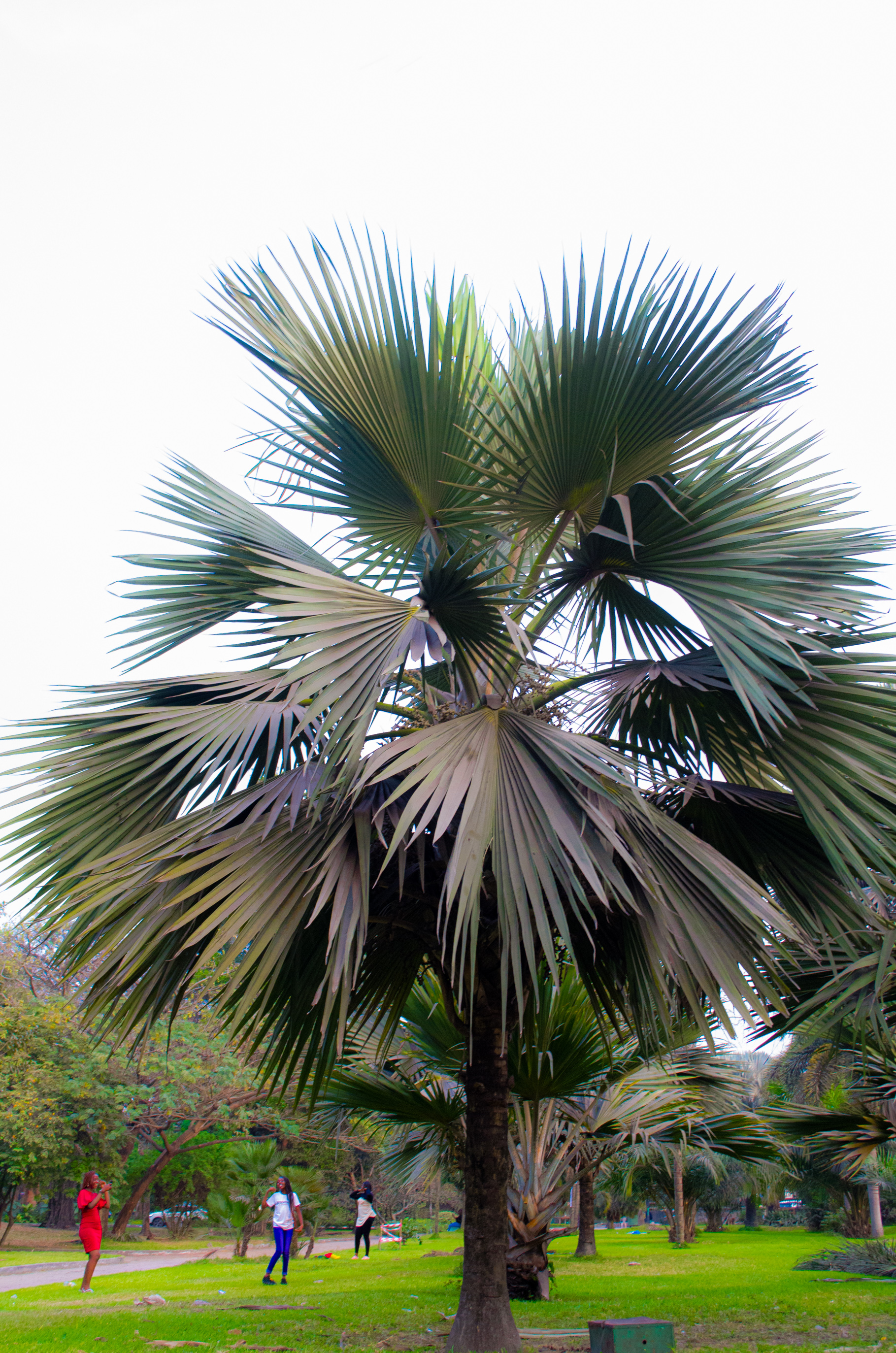
A Bismarckia palm with wide, silver-green fan-shaped fronds stands.

Serving as JBK's largest and most central department, the service manages plant cultivation, upkeep, and scientific supervision. It is subdivided into three main sections: the Nursery Section, the Horticulture Section, and the Living Collection Section:

==== Nursery Section ====
The Nursery Section functions as a pilot program for plant reproduction and propagation. Its core objectives include the sustainability of existing species, the adaptation and acclimatization of new species, and the development of hybrids through selective breeding and crossbreeding techniques. This section also plays a community-oriented role by selling plants to individuals and organizations for urban beautification initiatives.

Located in the northern part of the garden, the nursery is divided into two primary zones:

- Eastern Zone: Dedicated to the cultivation of ornamental plants.
- Vegetable Garden: Focused on market gardening, including germination and early plant growth.

Regular horticultural activities carried out in this section include sowing, cuttings, transplanting, watering, plot maintenance, compost handling, and flowerbed arrangement. These tasks are performed using various tools such as pruners, hoes, transplanters, rakes, watering cans, and wheelbarrows. The nursery is staffed by a team of five personnel, including four qualified technicians and one agricultural engineer who oversees the section.

==== Horticulture Section ====
The Horticulture Section encompasses both agronomic and ornamental plant management. On the agronomic side, it is tasked with overseeing seed and fertilizer inventories, coordinating production cycles in orchards and food crop plots, and supervising tasks such as mowing, plowing, and soil preparation. It also manages the harvest and sale of agricultural produce.

In terms of ornamental horticulture, the section is responsible for the layout and maintenance of garden spaces, the cultivation of flowers and pergolas, and the organization of plant exhibitions and sales. This section actively explores innovative horticultural techniques and introduces new plant varieties to expand the garden's botanical collection. Staff also contribute to administrative planning by submitting regular reports and recommendations to garden management.

==== Living Collection Section ====
The section curates the JBK's botanical diversity. It includes a wide array of plant species from various botanical families, some of which are formally labeled while others remain unlabeled. The table below presents selected species and their corresponding plant families:

No.	Family	Selected species
1.	Fabaceae	Millettia laurentii; Pterocarpus tinctorius; Delonix regia; Millettia versicolor; Millettia drastica
2.	Arecaceae	Areca catechu; Elaeis guineensis; Cocos nucifera; Chrysalidocarpus lutescens; Caryota mitis; Bismarckia nobilis; Attalea macrocarpa; Livistona chinensis
3.	Bombacaceae	Adansonia digitata; Ceiba pentandra
4.	Moraceae	Milicia excelsa; Ficus lyrata; Ficus elastica
5.	Caesapiniaceae	Caesalpinia pulcherrima; Pachiclasma tessmannii; Peltophorum pterocarpum
6.	Oxalidaceae	Averrhoa carambola
7.	Annonaceae	Annona muricata; Cananga odorata
8.	Mimosoideae	Calliandra surinamensis; Samanea leptophylla
9.	Anacardiaceae	Spondias cytherea
10.	Euphorbiaceae	Moluccan Aleurists; Hevea brasiliensis
11.	Rutaceae	Murraya paniculata; Murraya exotica
12.	Myrtaceae	Psidium cattleyanum; Syzygium malaccense
13.	Agavaceae	Agave americana; Dracaena arborea
14.	Combretaceae	Terminalia superba
15.	Musaceae	Ravenala madagascariensis
16.	Araucariaceae	Agathis Dammara
17.	Apocynaceae	Thevetia peruviana
18.	Bignoniaceae	Spathodea campanulata
19.	Casuarinaceae	Casuarina equisetifolia
20.	Pandanaceae	Pandanus dubius
21.	Pinaceae	Pinus canariensis
22.	Podocarpaceae	Podocarpus milanjianus
23.	Cupressaceae	Hesperocyparis lusitanica
24.	Sterculiaceae	Theobroma cacao

=== Environmental education service ===
The service raises public awareness about environmental conservation and sustainable practices. Its mission is to educate the general population on responsible behaviors toward the natural environment to prevent ecological degradation and promote long-term preservation. The service integrates scientific knowledge with outreach activities, drawing on disciplines such as phytosociology, phytopathology, and plant ecology to inform and engage visitors.

=== Marketing department ===
Charged with the task of promoting and monetizing the garden's services and products, the marketing department's primary function is to facilitate the sale of plant species, particularly those cultivated in the nursery, to individuals, organizations, and community groups interested in landscape beautification or agricultural development. In addition, it manages publicity for JBK's rentable facilities, such as its multipurpose room and outdoor areas, which host events like weddings, conferences, and private functions.

== History ==
=== 1930–1990s: Colonial foundations and transition to Congolese control ===
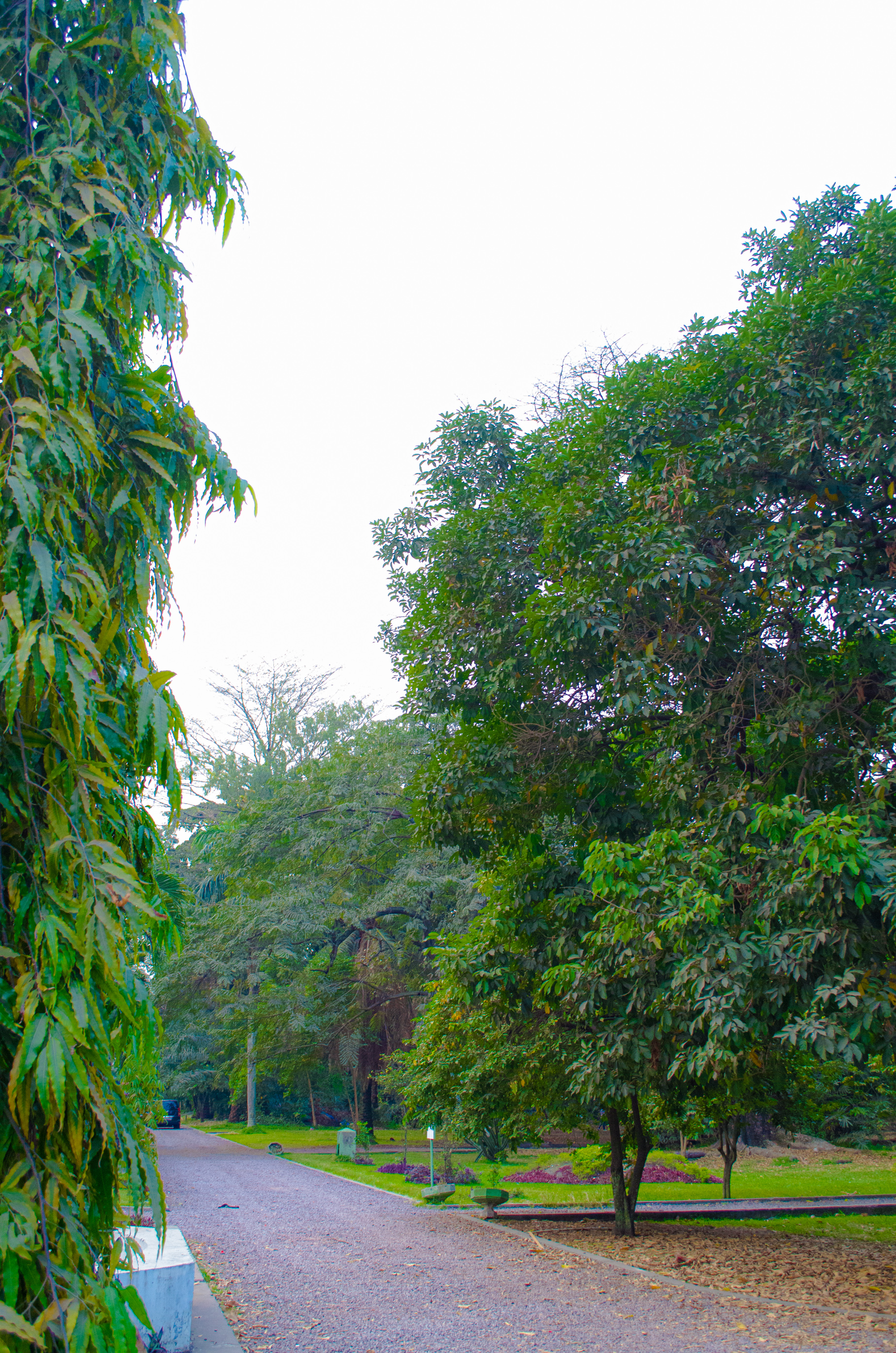
A gravel pathway winds into the distance, flanked by lawns and a variety of green trees.

The Kinshasa Botanical Garden was originally established as the "Parc de Bock" in 1933 by District Commissioner Fernand De Bock in then-Léopoldville (now metamorphosed into the modern Kinshasa). Initially, it was placed under the authority of the Institut des Parcs Nationaux du Congo-Belge (IPNCB). Following the nation's newfound autonomy in 1960, the management of the garden transitioned to Congolese control. According to Congolese environmentalist Metternich Ngoy, it was subsequently administered by the Society of Zoological and Botanical Gardens of Kinshasa (Société des Jardins Zoologiques et Botaniques de Kinshasa). On 2 October 1968, it hosted a public meeting where Pierre Mulele was declared guilty of committing crimes against the nation by Mobutu Sese Seko and was subsequently arrested before the end of the speech. In 1969, Mobutu initiated major environmental reforms, founding the Congolese Institute for Nature Conservation (Institut Congolais pour la Conservation de la Nature, ICCN) under the leadership of Belgian conservationist Jacques Verschuren, and establishing the State Environmental Commission (Commission environnementale de l'État).

As part of Mobutu's Authenticité campaign, the park was renamed Parc de la Révolution in 1970. That year also saw the construction of a multipurpose amphitheater intended for cultural, political, and scientific functions. The ICCN was renamed the Zaire Institute for Nature Conservation (Institut Zaïrois pour la Conservation de la Nature, IZCN) on 22 July 1975, falling under the jurisdiction of the Ministry of Agriculture. In 1978, the garden acquired its current name, Jardin Botanique de Kinshasa, under the newly created Zoological and Botanical Garden Institute of Zaire (Institut des Jardins Zoologiques et Botaniques du Zaïre, IJZBZ), as per presidential order No. 078/215 of 5 May 1978. That same year, infrastructure improvements were carried out, including the addition of new facilities. In 1989, the Agence Zaïroise de Presse (now Agence Congolaise de Presse, ACP) reported that 340 million ZRZ had been allocated for the modernization of the country's zoological and botanical gardens. At the time, the garden hosted 780 plant specimens, 698 native and 82 exotic species, and benefited from Belgian scientific cooperation until its termination in 1991.

=== 1997–2020s: Post-Mobutu reorganization, wars, restoration, and reopening ===
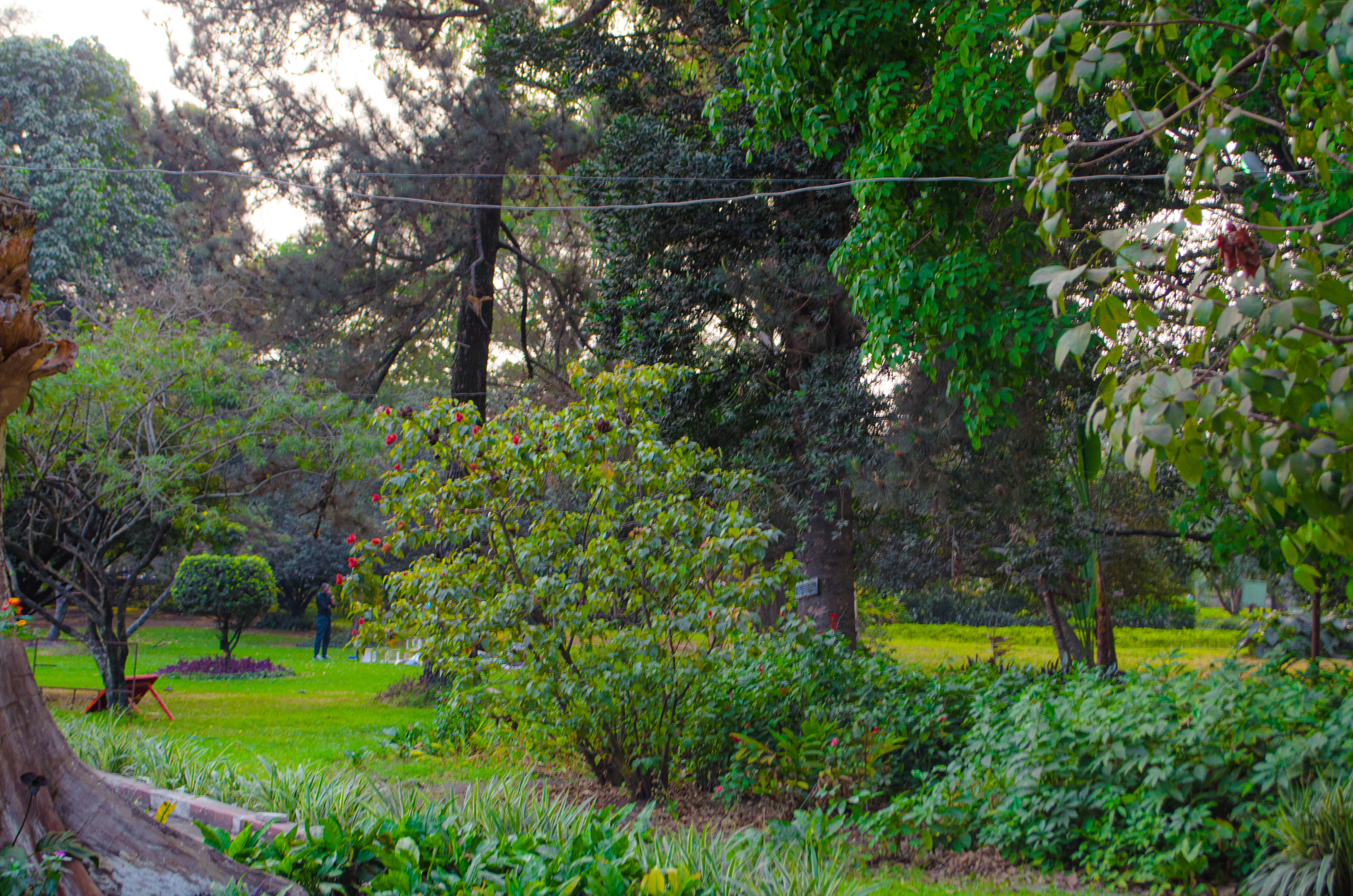
The lush greenery featuring a variety of trees with dense foliage.

In 1997, following the fall of Mobutu's regime and the transformation of Zaire into the Democratic Republic of the Congo, the IZCN reverted to its earlier designation, Institut Congolais pour la Conservation de la Nature (ICCN). During Laurent-Désiré Kabila's administration, the garden came under the oversight of the Ministry of Environment, Nature Conservation, and Tourism, as well as the Ministry of Finance. Renovations included internal and external parking, a reception hall, landscaped rock gardens with a fountain, an administrative building, and a plant systematics area. The Second Congo War (1998–2003) severely disrupted conservation efforts and led to long-term neglect of the garden. In 2003, the garden was officially registered with Botanic Gardens Conservation International (BGCI). A comprehensive restoration project began in 2008 with support from international partners including the European Union, the International Union for Conservation of Nature (IUCN), the National Botanical Garden of Belgium, and the NGO Friends of Nature and Gardens. The revitalized garden was officially reopened to the public on 27 June 2010 by President Joseph Kabila.

In August 2021, the Tourism Promotion Fund (Fonds de Promotion du Tourisme), established by Decree No. 09/65 of 3 December 2009, provided the botanical garden with ten bungalows.
