= Kinshasa Zoological Garden =

Animal park in Gombe, Kinshasa

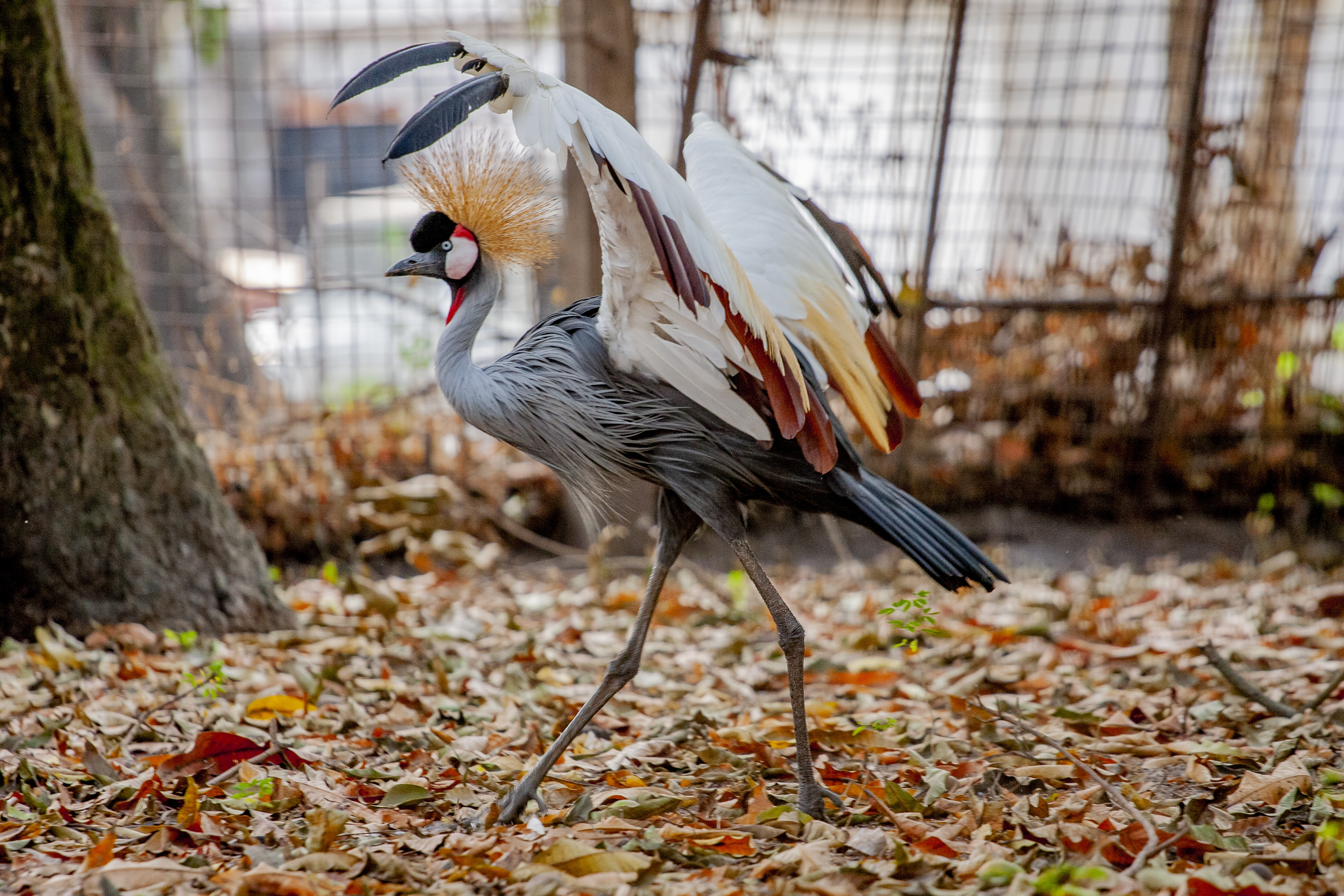
- Colorful African crowned crane in Kinshasa Zoological Garden
- Interactive map of Kinshasa Zoological Garden
- Date opened: July 17, 1938; 87 years ago
- Location: Gombe, Kinshasa, Democratic Republic of the Congo
- No. of animals: 129
- No. of species: 30
- Owner: Congolese Institute for Nature Conservation
- Director: Simon Dinganga Tra Ndeto
- Website: https://zoodekinshasa.com/

The Kinshasa Zoological Garden (French: Jardin Zoologique de Kinshasa), also known as Kinshasa Zoo (Zoo de Kinshasa), is an animal park located in the Gombe commune, next to the Kinshasa Grand Market and the Kinshasa General Hospital in the Democratic Republic of the Congo. The zoo is home to over 30 species of animals, including mammals, reptiles, birds, fish, and amphibians, totaling more than 129 animals.

The zoo attracts approximately 1,000 visitors and serves as an educational hub, providing practical training opportunities for children and students interested in zoological science, with nearly 4,000 students from various schools in the capital taking guided tours from December to July.

== History ==
The Jardin Zoologique was established in 1933 by Fernand De Bock, the Administrator of Léopoldville (now Kinshasa), along with the Jardin Botanique de Kinshasa. Originally located west across Ave. des Palmiers, which later became Prince Baudouin (now Ave. Kasa-Vubu), it opened on 17 July 1938, and has been managed by the Congolese Institute for the Conservation of Nature (Institut Congolais pour la Conservation de la Nature; ICCN) since its inception. The complex had an Art Deco entryway and a restaurant in the same architectural style at the far end.

In June 1939, a series of animal postage stamps was issued, with the proceeds amounting to Fr.300,000 to benefit the zoo. On its fifth anniversary, the zoo held an exhibition attended by Belgian Prime Minister Hubert Pierlot and a soirée at the restaurant. In August 1954, the zoo received its first okapi, the elusive creature discovered in the Ituri Forest in the northeastern part of the Belgian Congo. The Zoo also featured a chimpanzee that mooched and smoked cigarettes cadged from visitors. King Baudouin of Belgium visited the zoo in May 1955 during his successful tour of the colony. By 1956, the zoo's fortunes began to decline, and controversies arose regarding the possibility of closure, with a portion of the complex being ceded to the nearby modern-day Kinshasa General Hospital. The zoo's cultural center, with a seating capacity of five hundred, served as a venue for meetings and conferences, complemented by catering from the Zoo Restaurant.

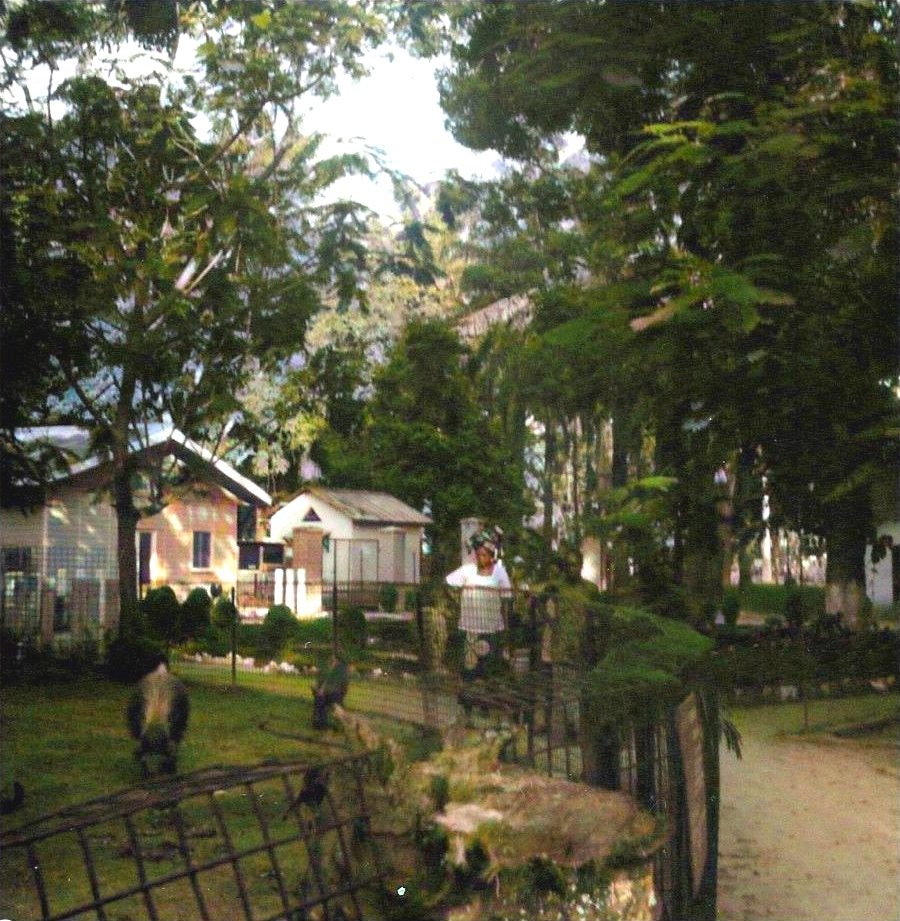
The Kinshasa Zoological Garden, November 1972

At its peak in 1958, the zoo had up to 5,000 animals of more than 1,000 species. Notably, in 1961, Premier Cyrille Adoula hosted his peers there after the election of the new Parliament. Over the years, the zoo underwent various transformations and rehabilitations. In 1988, the National Institute of Arts (Institut National des Arts) rehabilitated the Cultural Center.

In the tumultuous periods of the First and Second Congo Wars, the zoo faced immense tribulations. The devastating effects of war led to dire conditions for the animals, as food shortages and lack of rejuvenation took a toll on their well-being. Tragically, many chimpanzees were reduced to drinking dirty water from bowls, resulting in starvation and the unfortunate demise of several animals by late 1999. In October 2007, the zoo was reported to be relocated to N'sele National Park. According to the Ministry of Environment, Didace Pembe Bokiaga, the park no longer met international standards for zoological gardens. Animals must live in semi-freedom. Another reason given is the need for reforestation of the Kinshasa Zoological Garden. In October 2009, it was announced that the French Embassy would rehabilitate the Zoo.

On 23 June 2016, the ICCN reintroduced a thousand gray parrots to the Bombo Lumene reserve on the Batéké Plateau. Cosma Wilungula, the ICCN director general, announced that the ICCN planned to release gray parrots, which had been kept in quarantine-like conditions in the Kinshasa zoo, back into the wild.

== Main exhibits ==
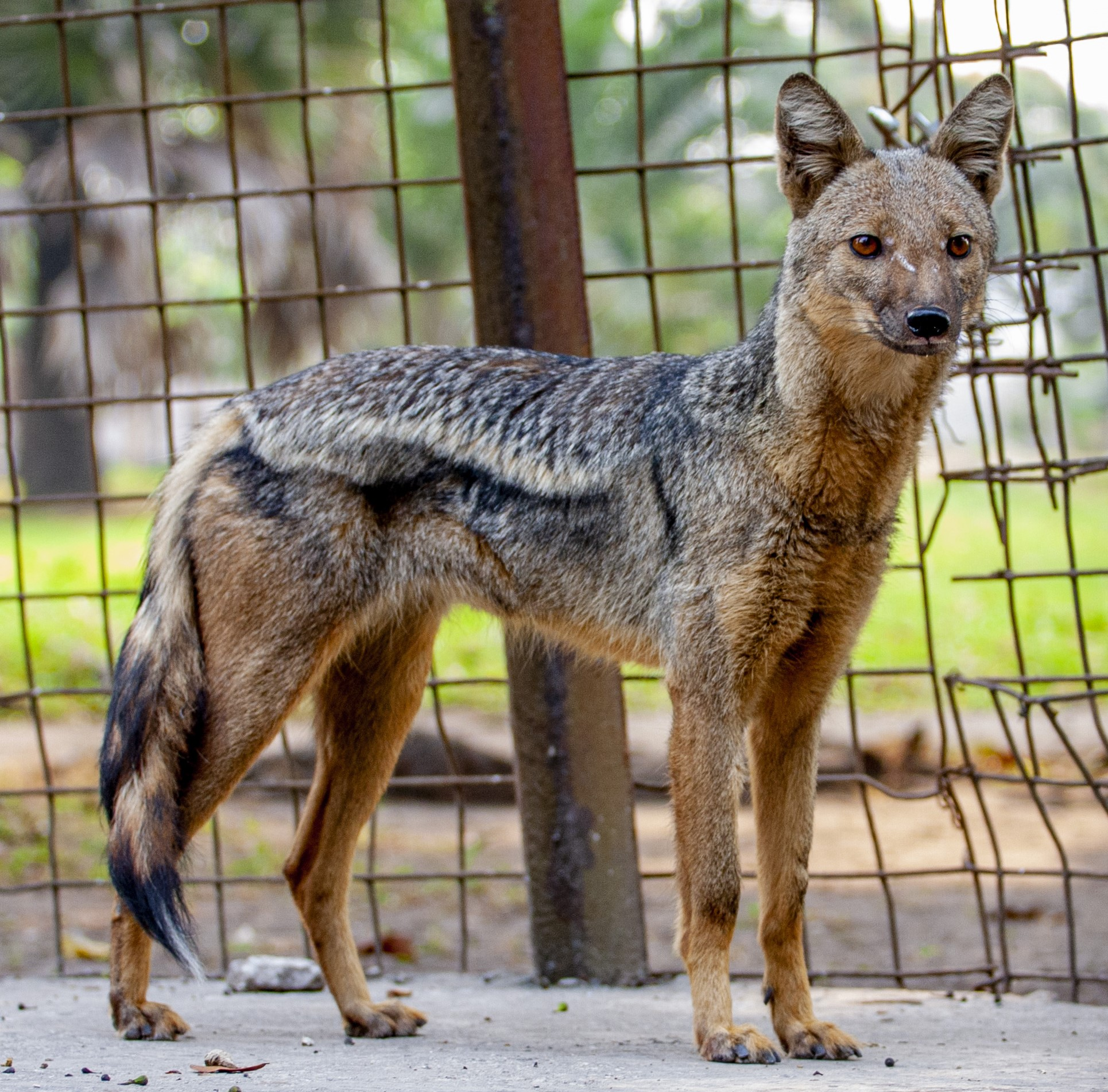
Side-striped jackal at the Kinshasa Zoological Garden

The zoo is committed to providing a safe haven for endangered species indigenous to the Democratic Republic of the Congo. The current exhibits include pythons, cobras, rattlesnakes, vultures, crows, cattle guards, eagles, turkeys, African marabous, crowned cranes, turtles, servals, civets, hawks, horses, pigs, jackals, buffalos, monitor lizards, kites, parrots, and donkeys. The zoo also houses a variety of primates, such as chimpanzees, black crested mangabeys, malbroucks, gorillas, and yellow baboons. The zoo also features several species of crocodiles, including Nile crocodiles. The oldest residents of the zoo are Simon and Antoinette, a crocodile couple who have been living in the zoo since 1938. They reside in the grass near the muddy water of their large pond, each in their own corner. The pair arrived at the zoo five years following its establishment.

== Efforts for conservation ==
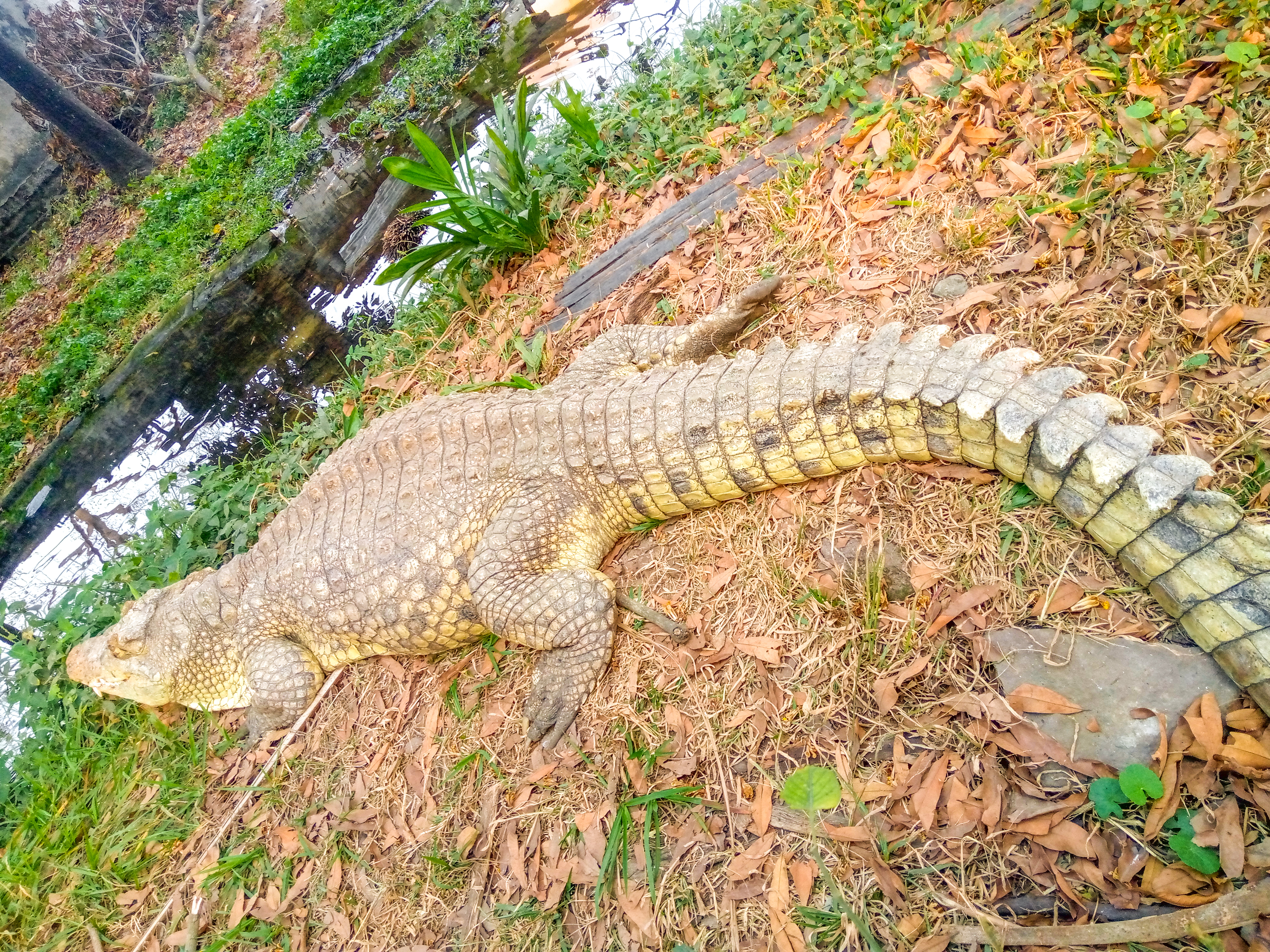
Nile Crocodile at the Kinshasa Zoological Garden

Since the First and Second Congo Wars, has faced a steady decline in its wildlife population due to environmental degradation, lack of treatment, limited funding, and poor site maintenance. Species such as lions, zebras, leopards, tigers, elephants, hippos, okapis, antelopes, bears, cheetahs, and giraffes have all diminished in number. The remaining animals live in impoverished conditions; some, like monkeys, even extend their hands through cages to beg for food from visitors. The park sustains itself through self-financing obtained from the sale of tickets to visitors, a money that is then used to purchase food for the animals. The Kinshasa National Zoological Park also benefits from food donations from nearby restaurants and supermarkets.

As of 2020, the zoo has over 129 animals, comprising approximately thirty species, according to Doctor Kazadi Fernand of the ICCN.

== Rehabilitation ==
On 29 July 2021, the National Minister of Tourism, Modero Nsimba Matondo, launched the rehabilitation works on the site. In November 2024, Tourism Minister Didier M'Pampia Musanga introduced plans to relocate and modernize the zoo in N'sele, where modern structures and enclosures could be established. However, activists and environmentalists argue that the relocation might harm existing habitats and overlook the relevance of zoos in the modern age. They propose transforming the zoo into a research and conservation center dedicated to preserving native Congolese species, alongside sustainable initiatives such as sanctuaries, species reintroduction programs, and habitat protection.

== Gallery ==
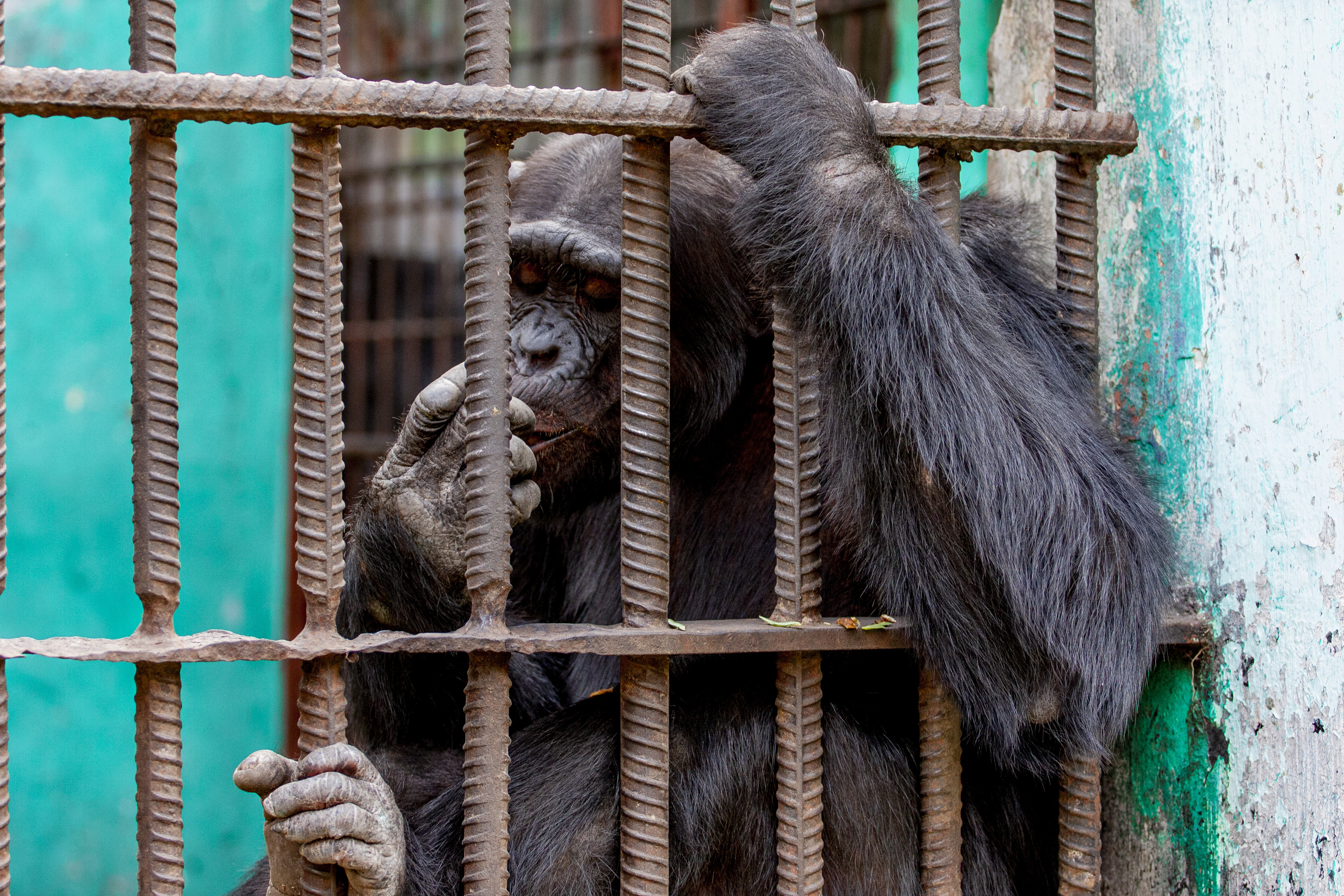
Chimpanzee

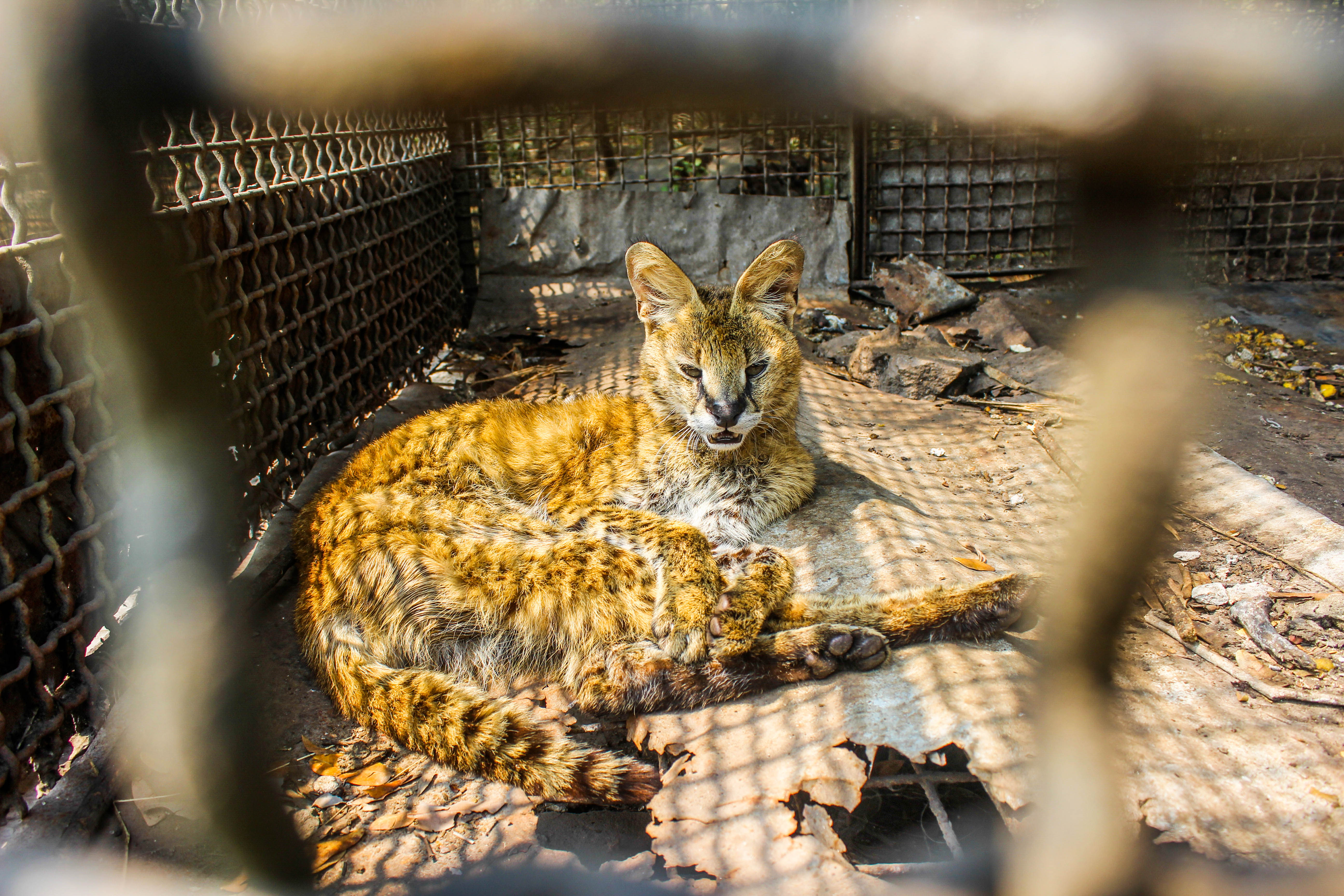
A majestic feline inhabitant of the zoo

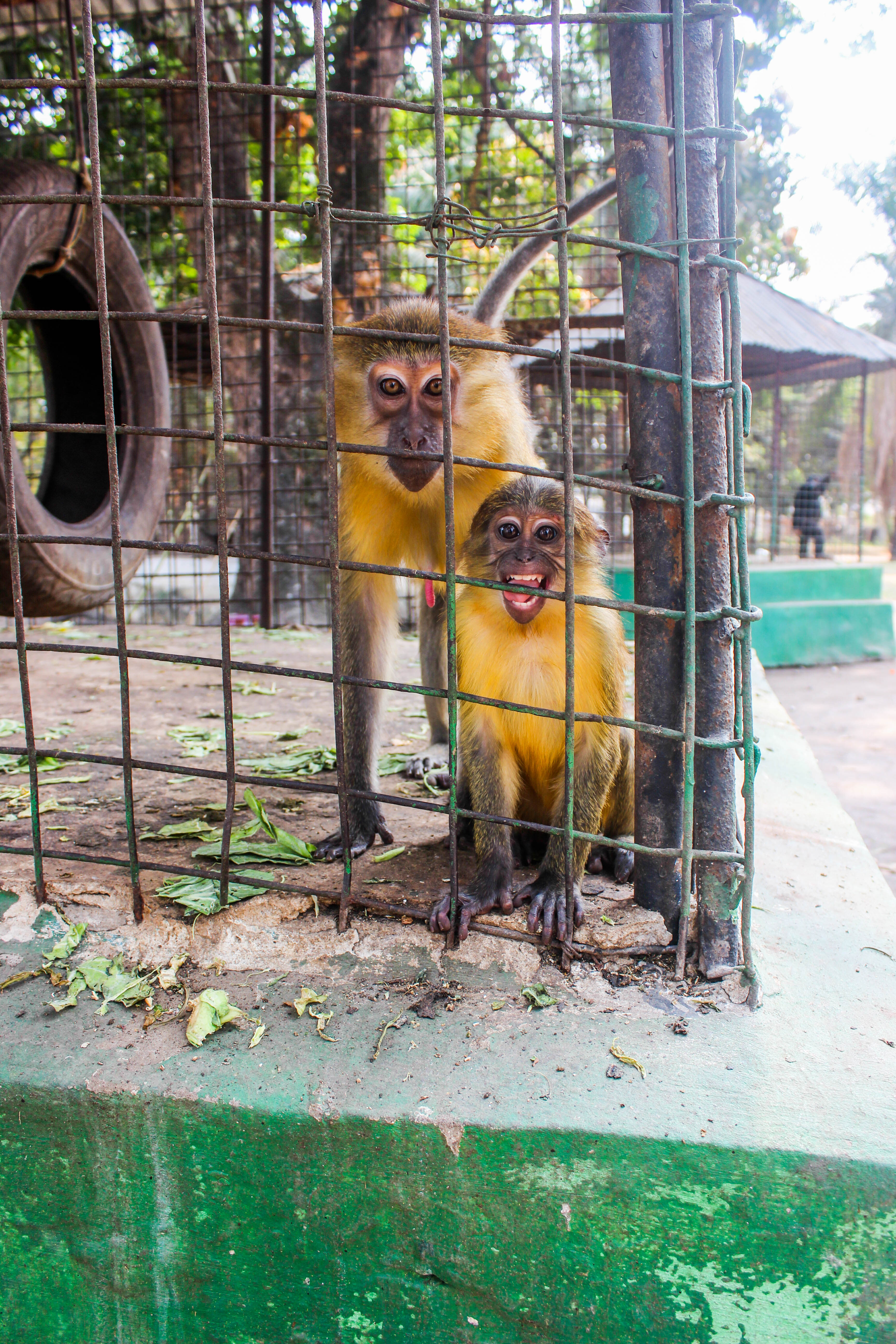
Monkeys

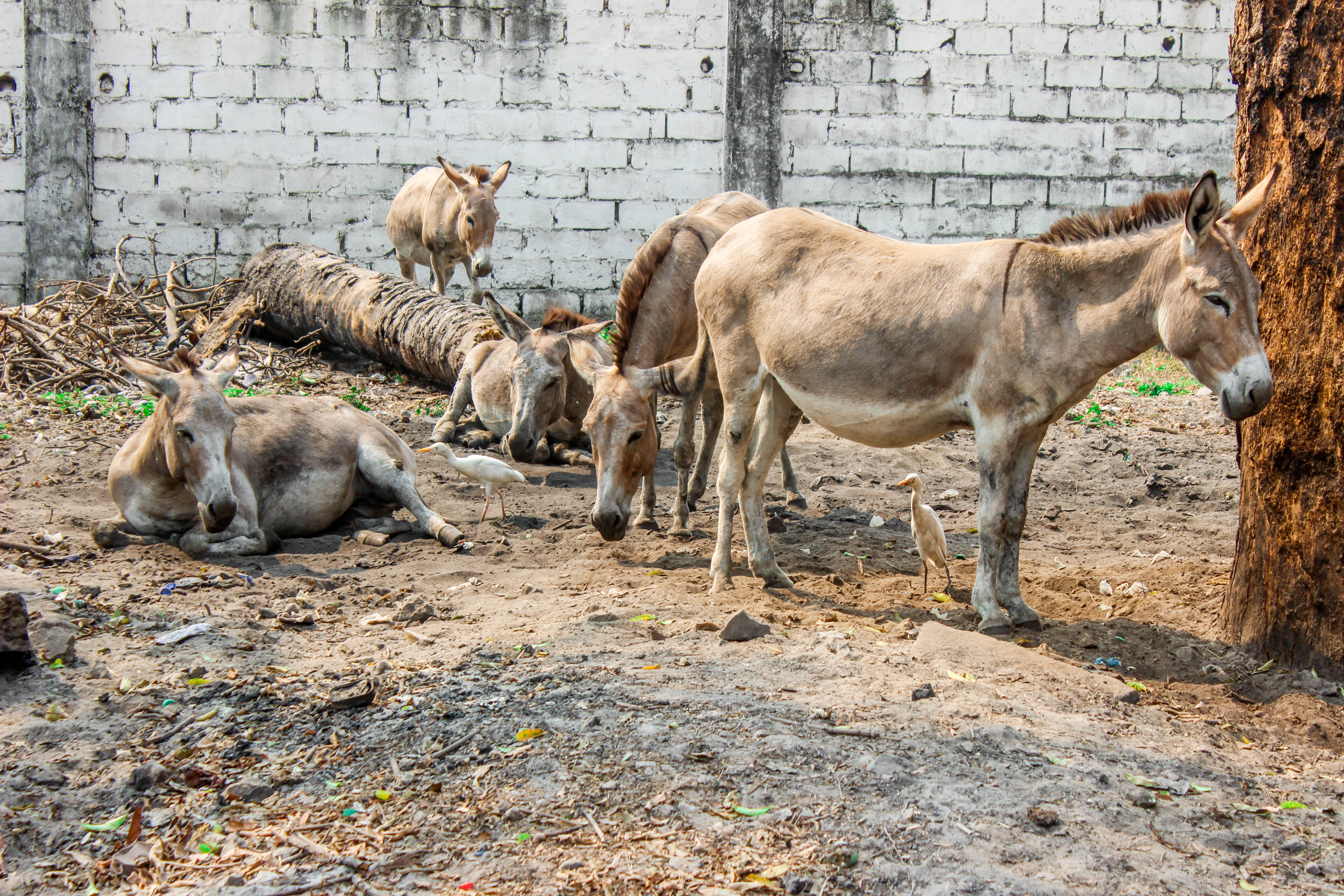
Donkeys

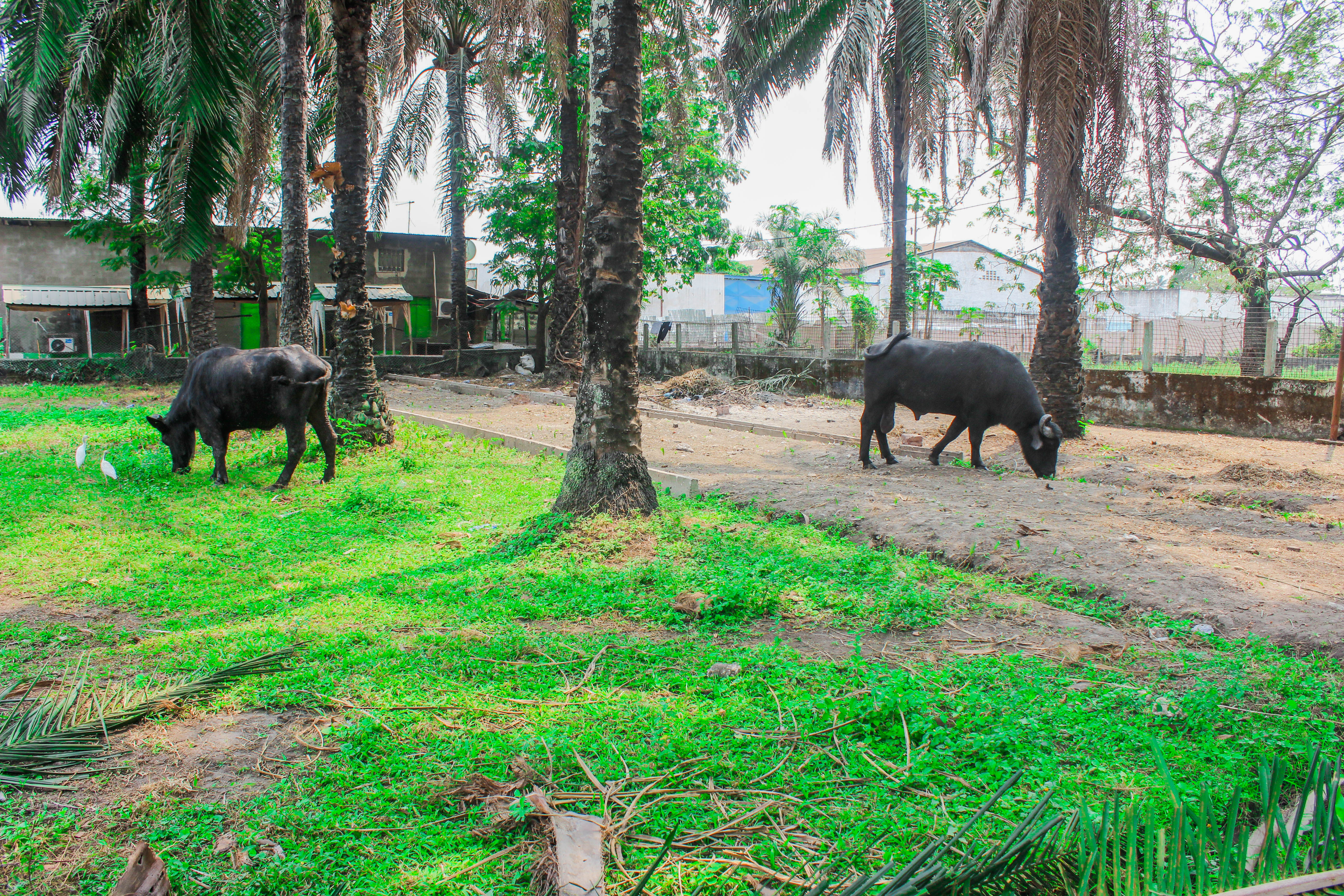
African buffaloes

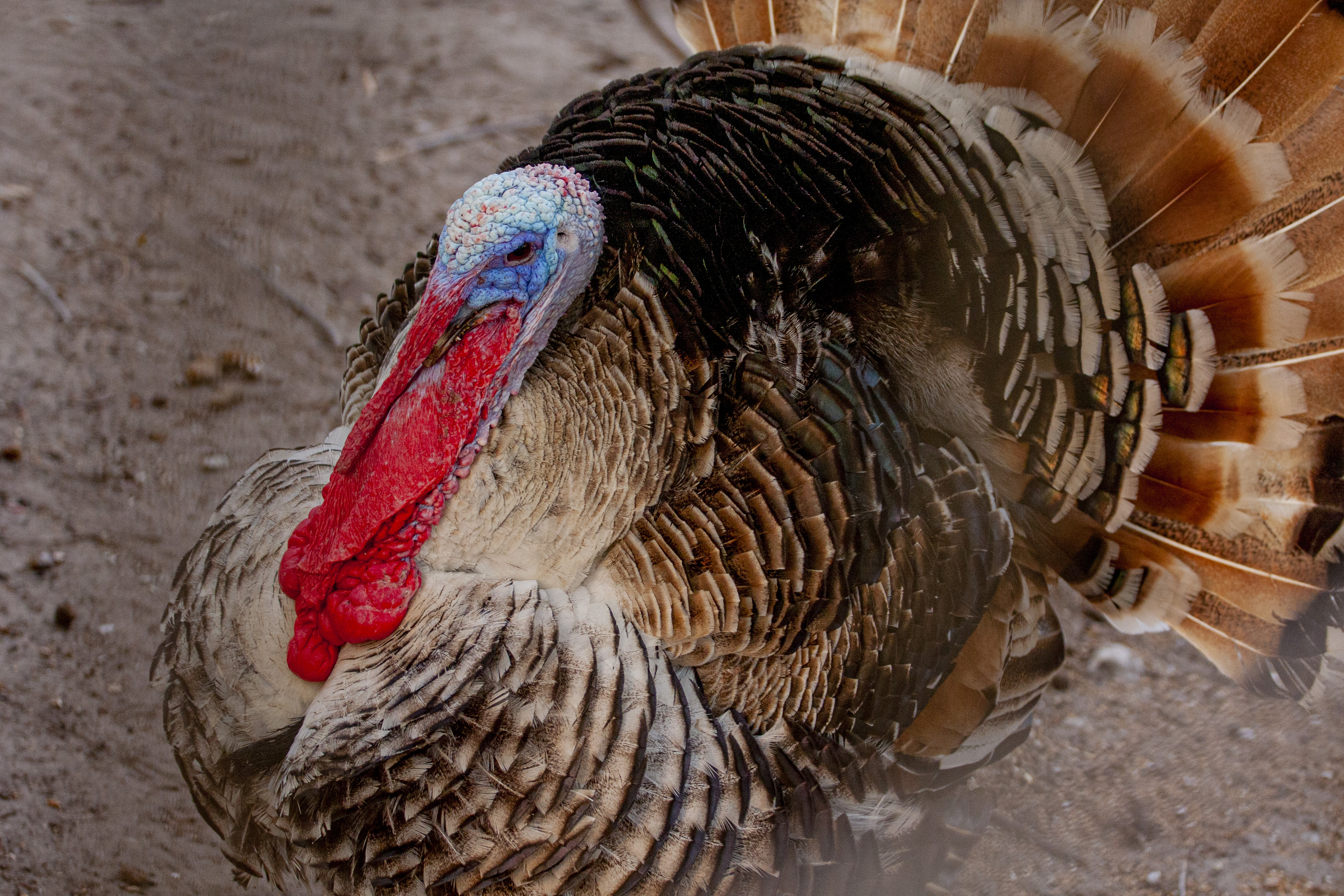
Turkey

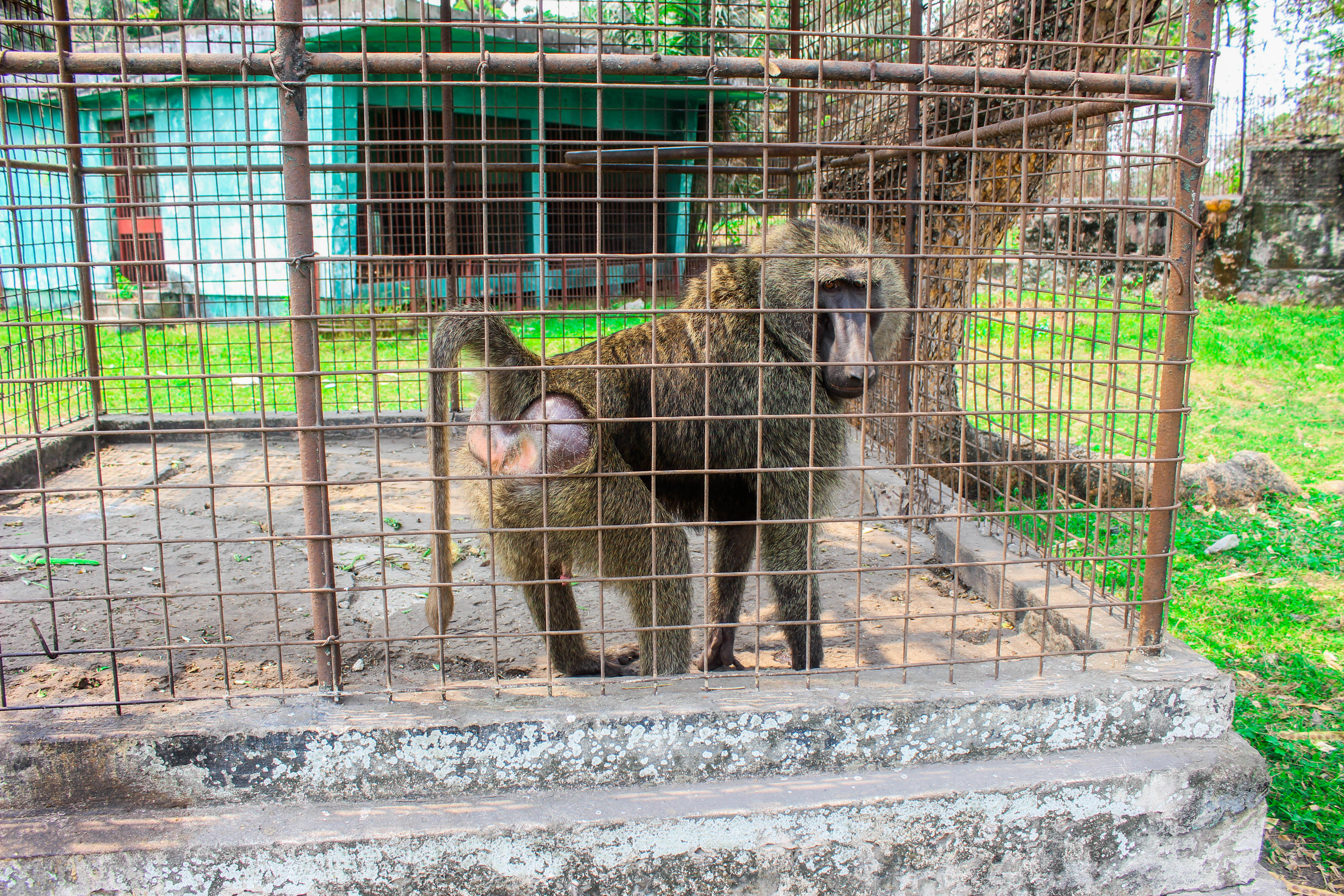
Yellow baboon

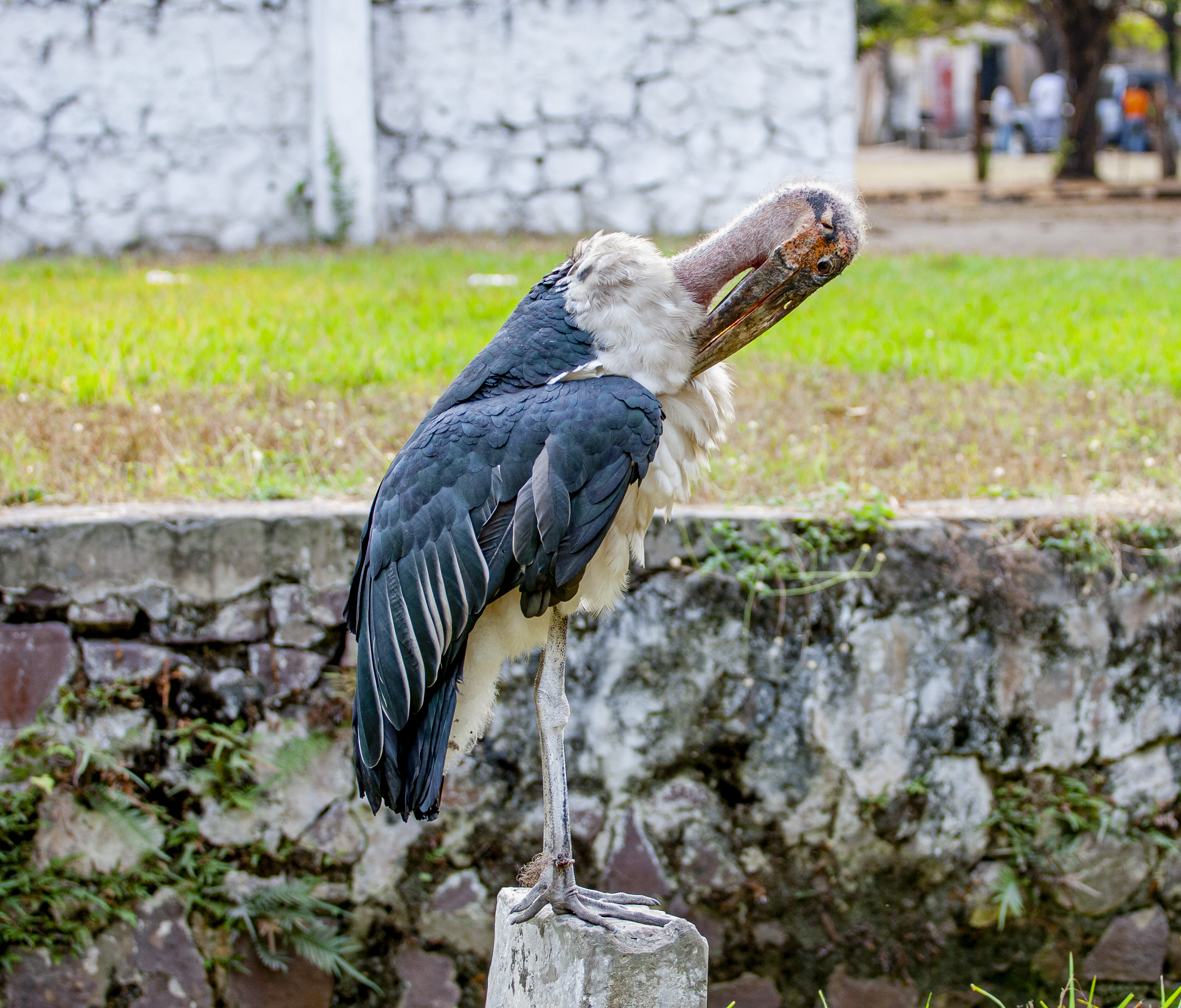
Marabou stork

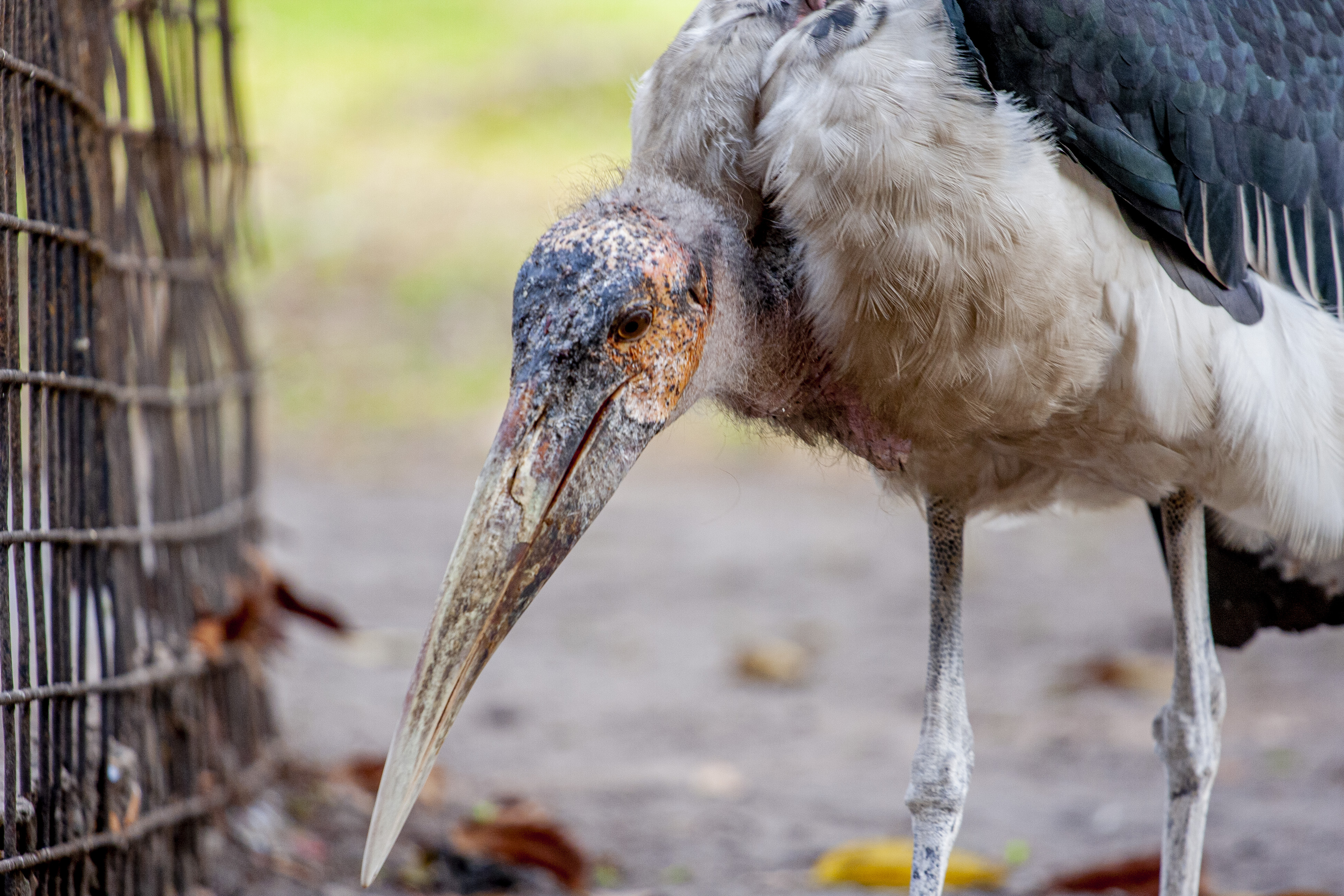
Marabou stork

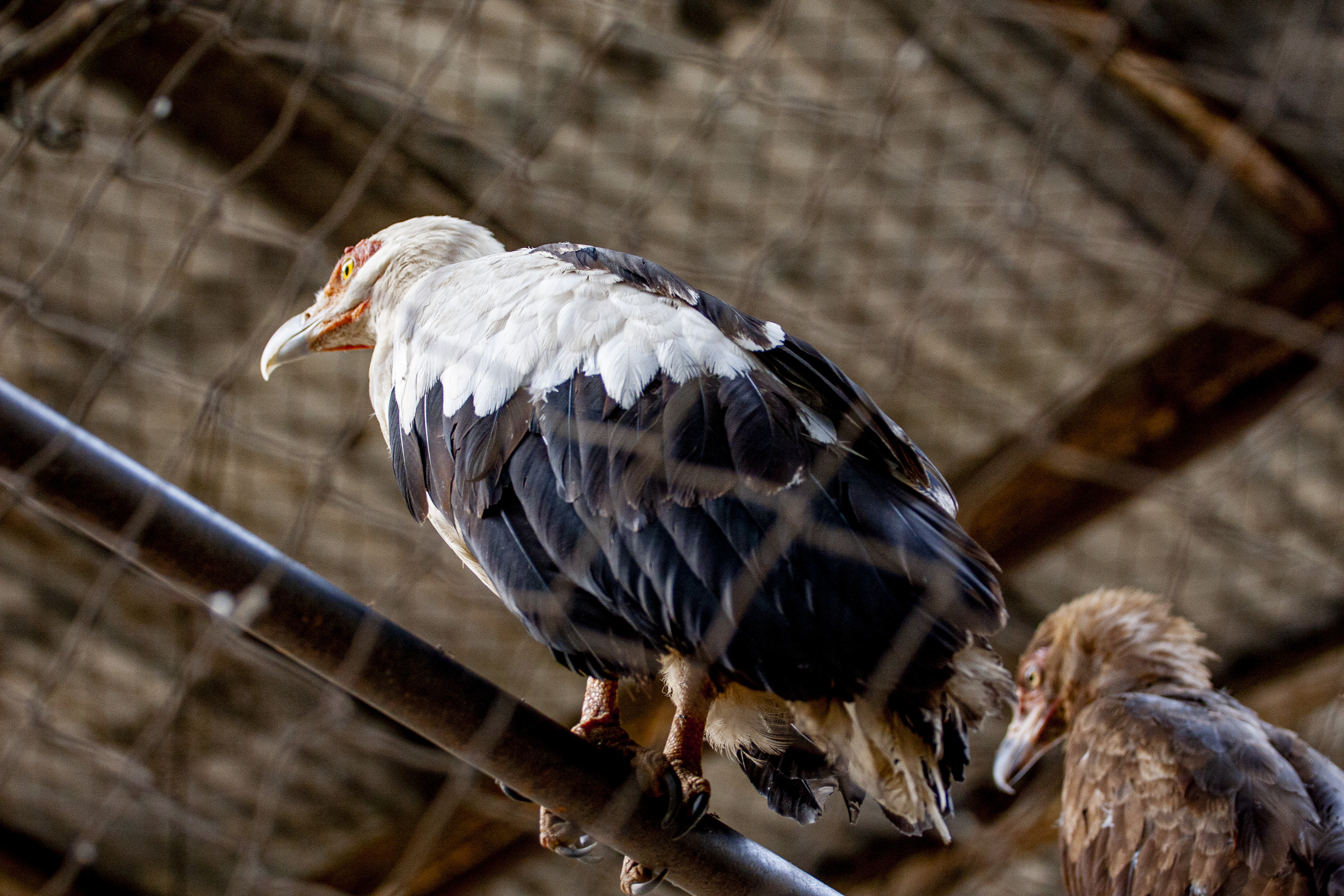
Palm-nut vulture

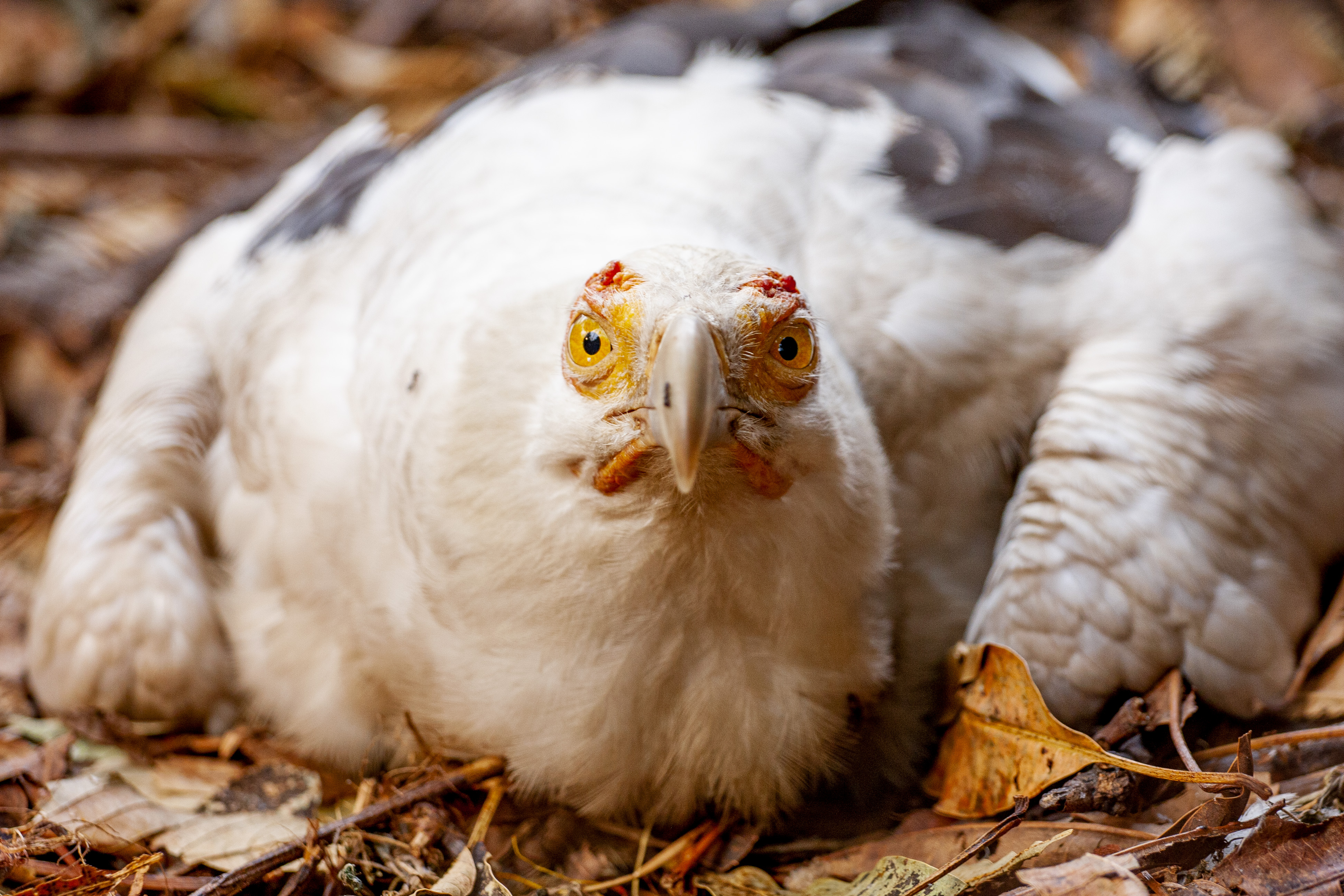
Palm-nut vulture

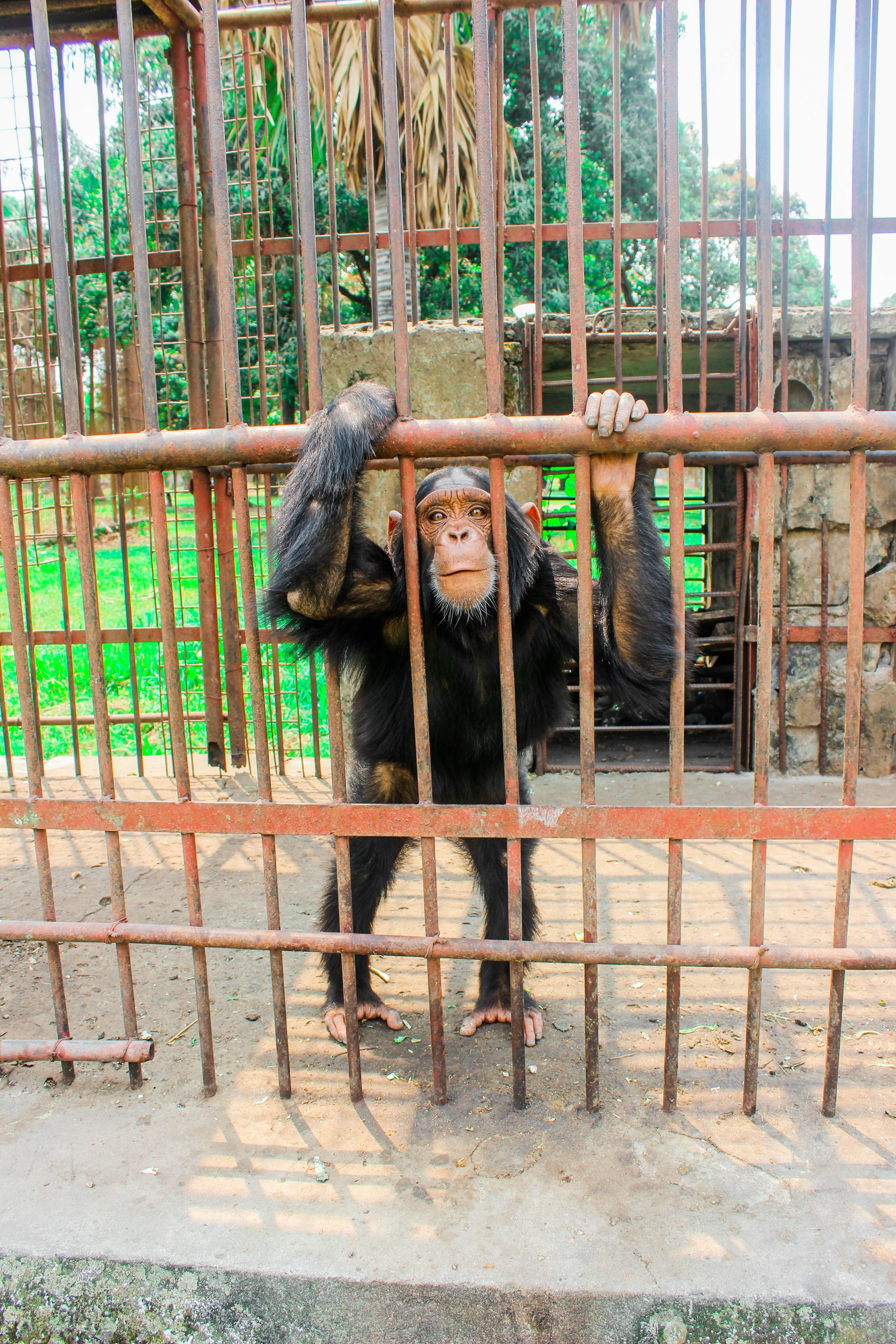
Chimpanzee

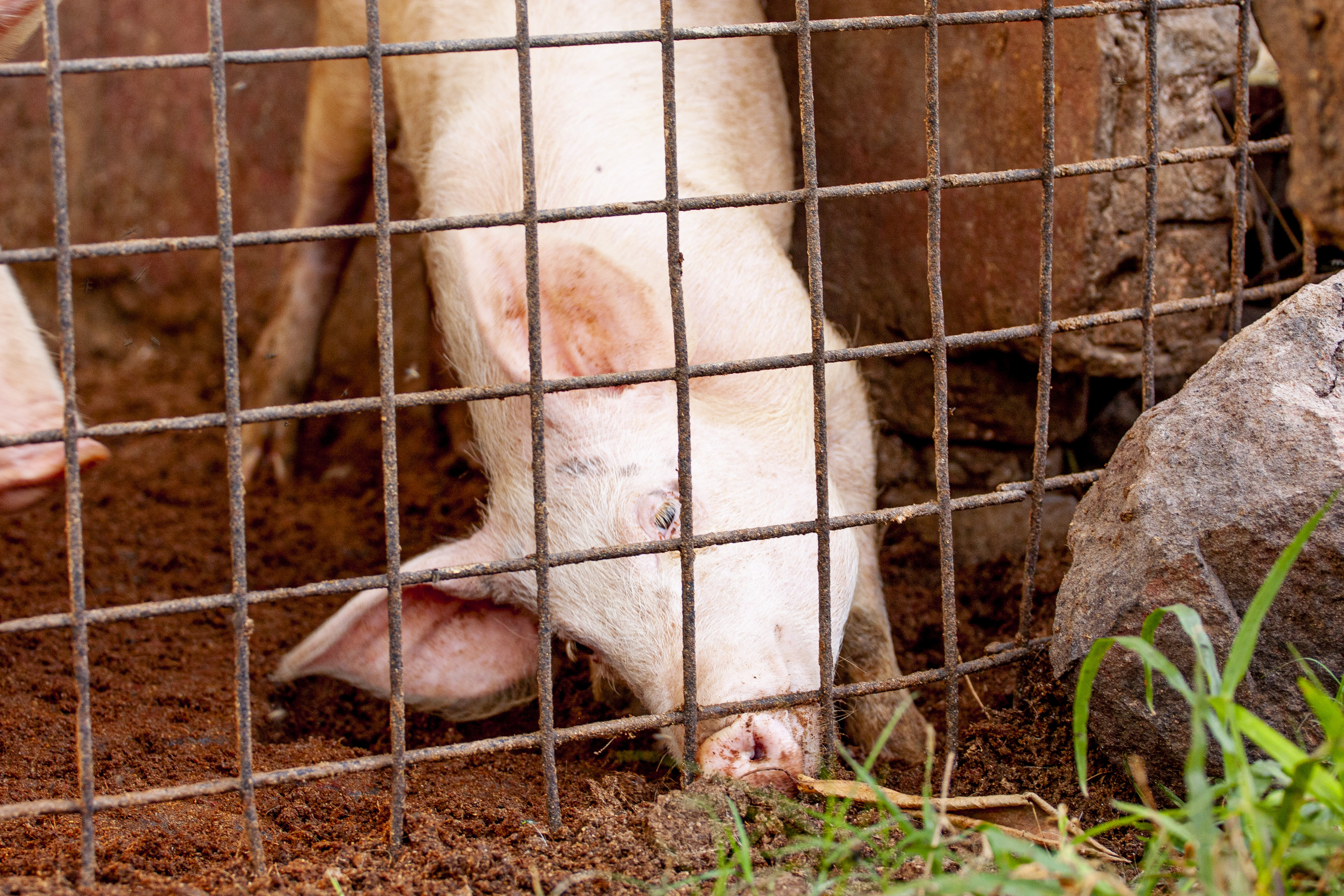
Pig
